= Canary Wharf station =

Canary Wharf station may refer to:

- Canary Wharf tube station, on the Jubilee line of the London Underground
- Canary Wharf DLR station, on the Docklands Light Railway in the northern area of the Canary Wharf complex
- Heron Quays DLR station, on the Docklands Light Railway in the southern area of the Canary Wharf complex
- Canary Wharf railway station, on the Elizabeth line
- Canary Wharf Pier, a river bus stop on the River Thames
