= Museum of London Group =

The Museum of London Group is a public body based in the City of London. Since 1 April 2008 it has been funded jointly by the Greater London Authority and the City of London Corporation. Prior to this date it was jointly controlled by the Department for Culture, Media and Sport and the City Corporation.

It comprises:

- the Museum of London at London Wall in the City of London;
- the Museum of London Docklands on West India Quay, near Canary Wharf;
- the London Archaeological Archive and Research Centre, (LAARC) located in Mortimer Wheeler House in Hackney.

Museum of London Archaeology (MOLA) was also formerly a part of the museum but is now an independent charity.
