= Westferry DLR station =

Docklands Light Railway station

Westferry
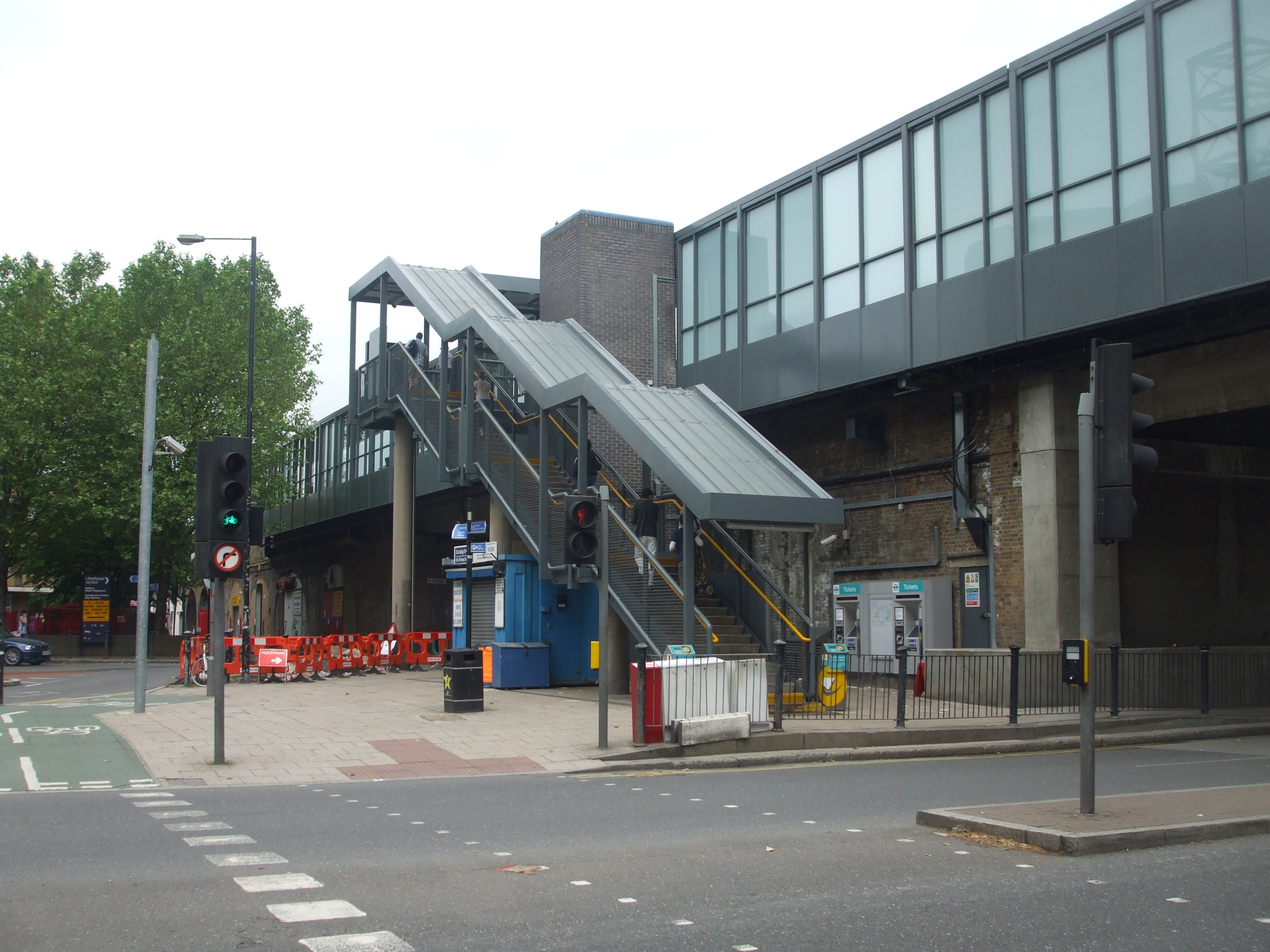
- Western entrance on Westferry Road

General information
- Location: Limehouse, Tower Hamlets
- Coordinates: 51.509372°N 0.026697°W
- Owned by: Transport for London
- Managed by: Docklands Light Railway
- Platforms: 2

Construction
- Structure type: Elevated
- Accessible: Yes

Other information
- Status: Unstaffed
- Fare zone: 2
- Website: Official website

History
- Opened: 31 August 1987

Passengers

DLR annual entry and exit
- 2020: ▼2.580 million
- 2021: ▲3.049 million
- 2022: ▲4.170 million
- 2023: ▼3.380 million
- 2024: ▲4.20 million
Location
- Location in Tower Hamlets

Westferry is a Docklands Light Railway (DLR) station in Limehouse in London, England. It is located in London fare zone 2. To the west is Limehouse station, whilst to the east the DLR splits, with one branch going to Poplar station and the other to West India Quay station.

== Location ==
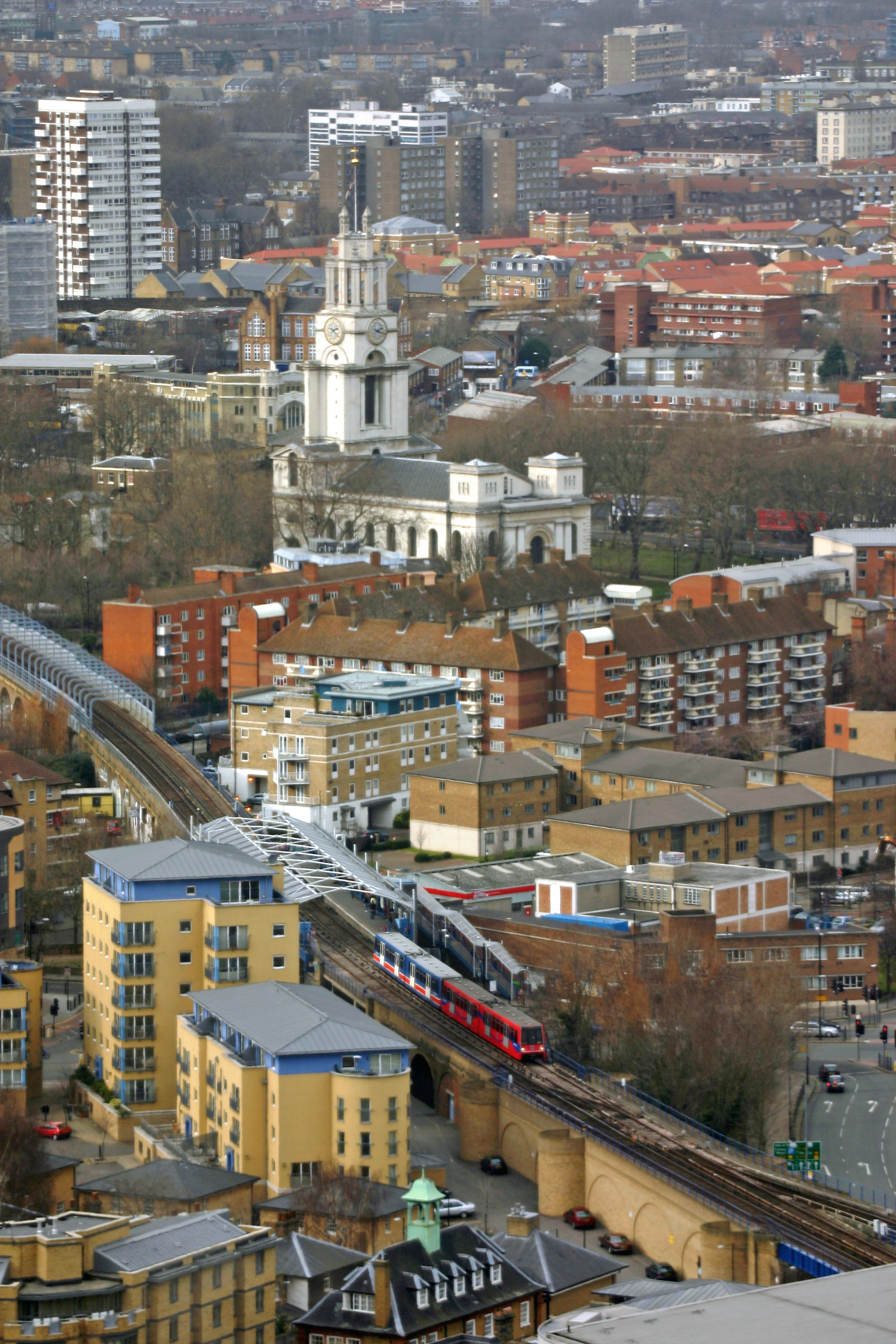
An eastbound train leaving Westferry Station.

The DLR station was built midway between the site of the old Limehouse and West India Docks stations on the disused London and Blackwall Railway. Limehouse Police Station is nearby, as is St Anne's Church, built by Nicholas Hawksmoor and boasting London's tallest church clock tower. The station is also close to Westferry Circus and Canary Wharf Pier.

== Etymology ==
Westferry station is in Limehouse and given its proximity to the former Limehouse station on the London & Blackwall Railway, could have been given this name, but instead Stepney East was renamed Limehouse and the DLR station there given that name. West India Quay was reserved for the station at the other end of West India Dock, so there was no obvious choice.

The station's name is derived from the nearby Westferry Road. However, there was never a west ferry. There was a passenger ferry at the southern tip of the Isle of Dogs run by the Greenwich watermen. It was accessed by two roads, East Ferry Road (also known locally as Farm Road) and Westferry Road, built in 1812 when a horse ferry was introduced alongside the passenger ferry. The two roads still exist, running down the centre and west side of the Isle of Dogs respectively. However, the road names refer to an ancient service at the far end of the Isle of Dogs from the station.

== Services ==
The typical off-peak service in trains per hour from Westferry is:

- 6 tph to Tower Gateway
- 18 tph to Bank
- 6 tph to Beckton
- 6 tph to Woolwich Arsenal
- 12 tph to Lewisham via Canary Wharf

Additional services call at the station during the peak hours, increasing the total service to up to 30 tph in each direction.

Preceding station	DLR	Following station
Limehouse towards Bank or Tower Gateway	Docklands Light Railway	Poplar towards Beckton or Woolwich Arsenal
Limehouse towards Bank or Tower Gateway	Docklands Light Railway	West India Quay (Westbound); One-way operation
Limehouse towards Bank or Tower Gateway	Docklands Light Railway	Canary Wharf (eastbound West India Quay Bypass) towards Lewisham

== Connections ==
London Buses routes 135, 277, D3, D7 and night routes N277 and N550 serve the station.
