= London Museum Docklands =

Museum in West India Quay, London

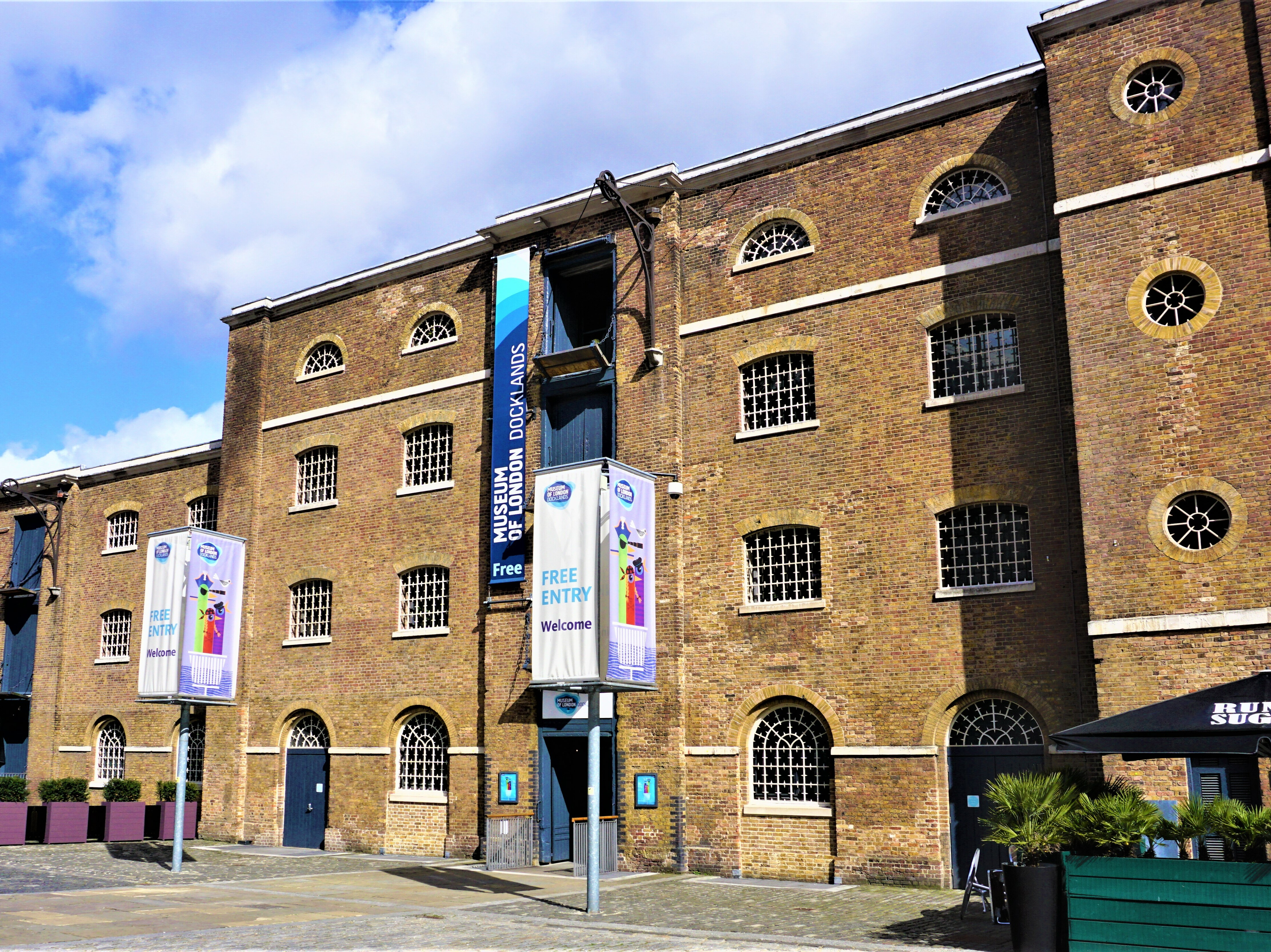

- Location within London Borough of Tower Hamlets
- Former name: Museum in Docklands; Museum of London Docklands
- Established: 2003; 23 years ago
- Location: West India Quay; London; E14; England
- Coordinates: 51°30′27″N 0°1′25″W
- Visitors: 324,438 (2019)
- Director: Sharon Ament
- Public transit access: West India Quay
- Website: londonmuseum.org.uk/docklands

Listed Building – Grade I
- Official name: Warehouses and general offices at western end of North Quay
- Designated: 19 July 1950
- Reference no.: 1242440

The London Museum Docklands in West India Quay, London, explains the history of the River Thames, the growth of the Port of London and the docks' historical link to the Atlantic slave trade. The museum is part of the London Museum and is jointly funded by the City of London Corporation and the Greater London Authority.

The museum opened in 2003 in grade I listed early 19th-century Georgian "low" sugar warehouses built in 1802 on the north side of West India Docks, a short walk from Canary Wharf.

== Collections and exhibits ==
Much of the museum's collection is from the museum and archives of the Port of London Authority, which became part of the port and river collections of the Museum of London in the 1970s. These were put into storage by the Museum of London in 1985. The museum includes videos presented by Tony Robinson, and it houses a large collection of historical artefacts, models, and pictures in 12 galleries and a children's gallery (Mudlarks), arranged over two floors. Visitors are directed through the displays in chronological order. The periods covered range from the first port on the Thames in Roman times to the closure of the central London docks in the 1970s and the subsequent transformation of the area with commercial and residential developments.

The museum has acquired several historic vessels for preservation over its existence. Among these were the tugboats Knocker White and Varlet, both acquired in 1986. By the 2010s the museum had decided to rationalise its collection of vessels; one was transferred to a local group, and another, the Wey barge Perseverance IV, to the National Trust. The last two vessels, Knocker White and Varlet, were transferred to Trinity Buoy Wharf in November 2016.

In 2007, the museum marked the bicentenary of the Slave Trade Act 1807, which abolished British involvement in the Atlantic slave trade by opening a £14 million exhibition funded by the National Lottery Heritage Fund entitled London, Sugar, Slavery. In March 2016, the museum opened an exhibit relating to the building itself. The building was originally called No. 1 Warehouse, and was built in 1802 during the expansion of West India Docks. In September of that year, the museum displayed Dick Moore's George Cross medal for bravery during the London Blitz. In 2017, the museum opened an exhibit displaying archaeological findings discovered during work on Crossrail. In September 2020, the museum put on display the Havering hoard in an exhibition that ran until 18 April 2021.

== Transport connections ==
| Service | Station/stop | Lines/routes served | Distance from London Museum Docklands |
|---|---|---|---|
| London Buses | Westferry station | 135, 277, D3, D7 | |
| London Underground | Canary Wharf | Jubilee line | 800 metres walk/15 minutes |
| Elizabeth line | Canary Wharf | Elizabeth line | 500 metres walk/10 minutes |
| Docklands Light Railway | West India Quay | Elizabeth line | 260 metres/5 minutes walk |
| London River Services | Canary Wharf Pier | Commuter Service; Rotherhithe to Canary Wharf Service | 650 metres/12 Minutes walk |

== See also ==
- London Docklands
- Museum of London
- Museum of London Archaeology
- Island History Trust
- Culture of London
- Robert Milligan (merchant)
- Statue of Robert Milligan, which stood outside the museum until 2020
