= Knocker White =

Coordinates: 51.507451°N 0.008131°E

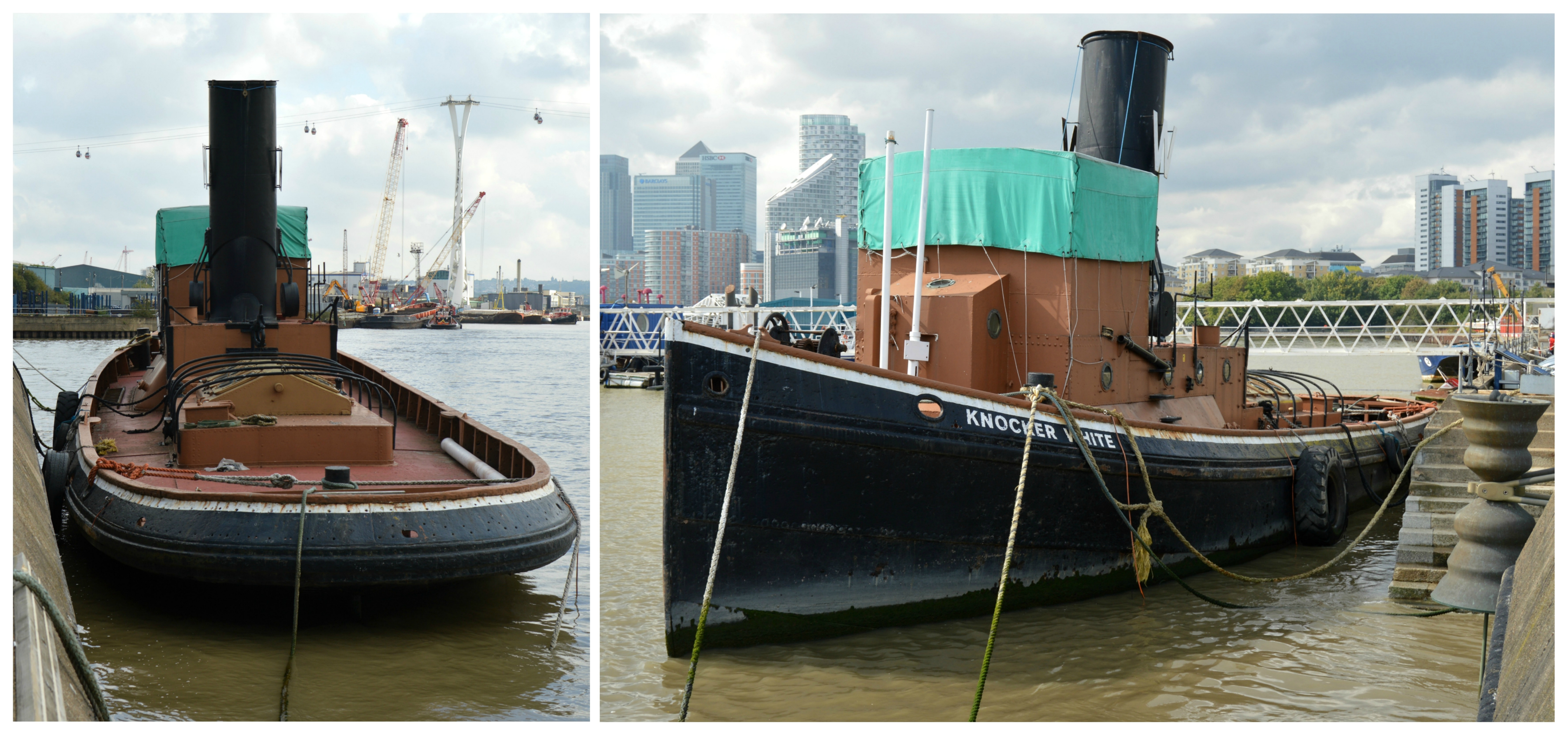
- Knocker White at Trinity Buoy Wharf

History

United Kingdom
- Name: Cairnrock (1924–1960); Knocker White (1960–present)
- Owner: Harrisons Lighterage Company, London; W. E. White & Sons, Rotherhithe
- Builder: T. van Duivendijk, Lekkerkerk, Netherlands
- In service: 1924
- Out of service: c. 1982
- Status: Museum ship

General characteristics
- Type: Tugboat
- Length: 77.2 ft (23.5 m)
- Beam: 20 ft (6.1 m)
- Depth: 9.6 ft (2.9 m)

Knocker White is a Dutch-built tugboat, currently preserved as a museum ship at Trinity Buoy Wharf. She was built in 1924 by T. van Duivendijk, Lekkerkerk, Netherlands for Harrisons Lighterage Company, under the name Cairnrock.

She was steam powered and was used for general towing work. She was later acquired by W. E. White & Sons, Rotherhithe, and in 1960 was renamed Knocker White, the nickname of one of the White family. She was refitted at some point, which involved modifications to her funnel and wheelhouse, and the installation of diesel engines by Petters Limited. She was sold for scrap in November 1982, but in 1984 was acquired by the Museum of London Docklands. In 2016 Knocker White was acquired by Trinity Buoy Wharf Trust, and after a stay at West India Quay, she has moved to Trinity Buoy Wharf. She is registered on the National Register of Historic Ships by National Historic Ships, with certificate number 2292.
