= Poplar DLR station =

Docklands Light Railway station

Poplar
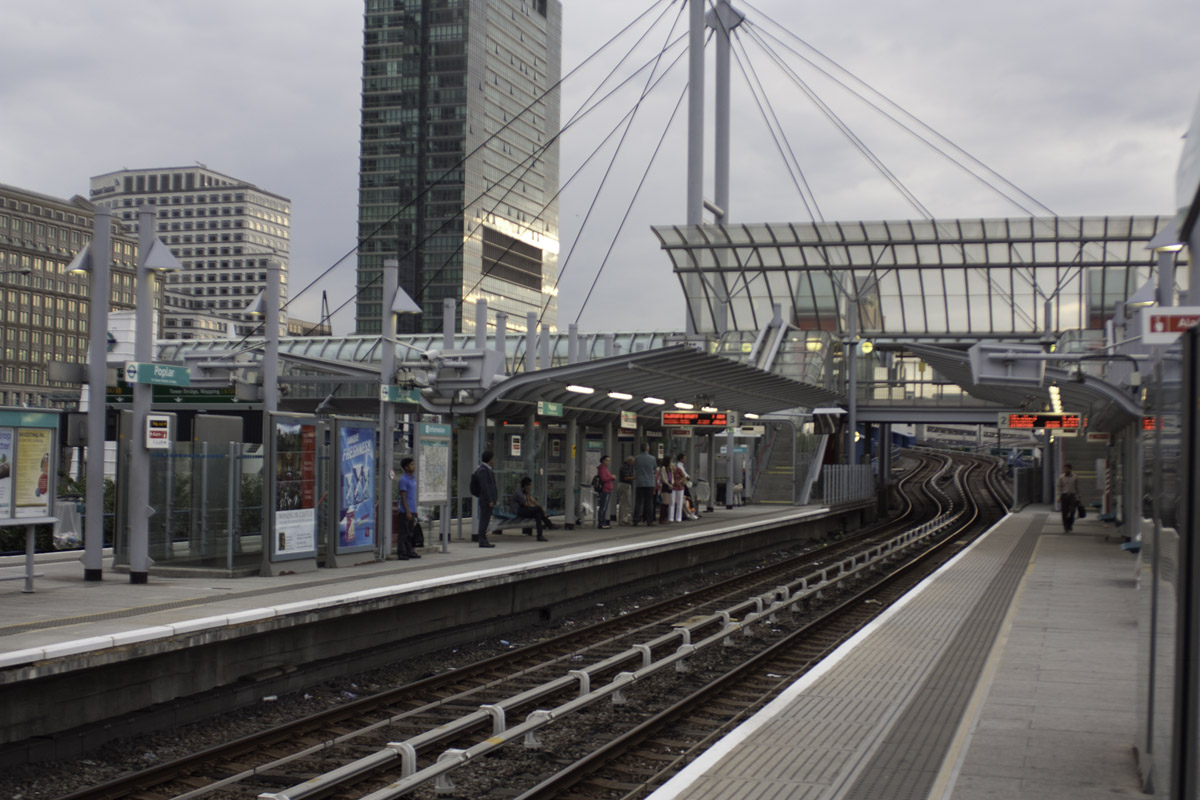
- Looking west at the two island platforms

General information
- Location: Poplar, Tower Hamlets
- Coordinates: 51.5077°N 0.0174°W
- Owner: Transport for London
- Manager: Docklands Light Railway
- Platforms: 4
- Connections: Out-of-station interchanges: Canary Wharf

Construction
- Structure type: Elevated
- Accessible: Yes

Other information
- Status: Unstaffed
- Fare zone: 2
- Website: Official website

History
- Opened: 31 August 1987

Passengers

DLR annual entry and exit
- 2021: ▼0.826 million
- 2022: ▲1.170 million
- 2023: ▲1.810 million
- 2024: ▼1.77 million
- 2025: ▼1.45 million
Location
- Location in Tower Hamlets

Poplar is a Docklands Light Railway (DLR) station in Poplar in London, England. Poplar is a cross-platform interchange station for three of the six lines on the DLR (Stratford-Canary Wharf, Bank-Woolwich Arsenal and Tower Gateway-Beckton) making it one of the busiest stations on the network in terms of services. It is also nearby the Canary Wharf Station on Crossrail's Elizabeth Line.

== History ==
Long before the opening of the DLR in 1987, there had been three stations with the name Poplar. However, none was on the site of the current station.

- Poplar railway station was on the London and Blackwall Railway between 8 July 1840 to 4 May 1926. This is near the site of Blackwall DLR station.
- Poplar (East India Dock Road) railway station on the North London Railway was in use from 1866 until 1944. This is now the site of All Saints DLR station.
- A third station named Poplar was constructed in 1851 but never opened. This was sited due south of the North London Railway station (now All Saints DLR), and due east of the present DLR depot.

Poplar DLR station was opened on 21 August 1987, served only by the Stratford-Island Gardens branch of the DLR. The station opened with 4 platforms served by 3 tracks similar to Canary Wharf, and was accessed via an underpass. As the DLR was expanded eastwards the station was remodelled with a new overbridge, the island platforms narrowed to serve 4 rather than 3 tracks, and extended to take two-car operation. On 28 March 1994 Poplar became the western terminus of the new Beckton branch, which opened the same day; on 31 July 1995, the line was extended west, joining Poplar with Westferry via a flying junction and enabling Beckton services to run to Tower Gateway. Bank to King George V (later Woolwich Arsenal) services through the station commenced on 2 December 2005.

A trial as is part of Mayor of London Draft Transport Strategy called Adopt a Station' took place in 2018, which aims to encourage the use of public transport with space at the station will be given over to help publicise community events, classes, and workshops. It will also provide a platform for schools and groups to showcase art and it is hoped the scheme will make travelling through the station a more pleasant experience.

== Location ==
Poplar serves a junction in four directions:

- Eastbound towards Beckton and Woolwich Arsenal (next station Blackwall)
- Northbound towards Stratford (next station All Saints)
- Southbound towards the Isle of Dogs and Lewisham (next station West India Quay)
- Westbound towards Bank and Tower Gateway (next station Westferry).

Poplar DLR depot is situated north of the station, and is accessed through a pair of tracks just east of Poplar. These feature the tightest curves in operation on the railway.

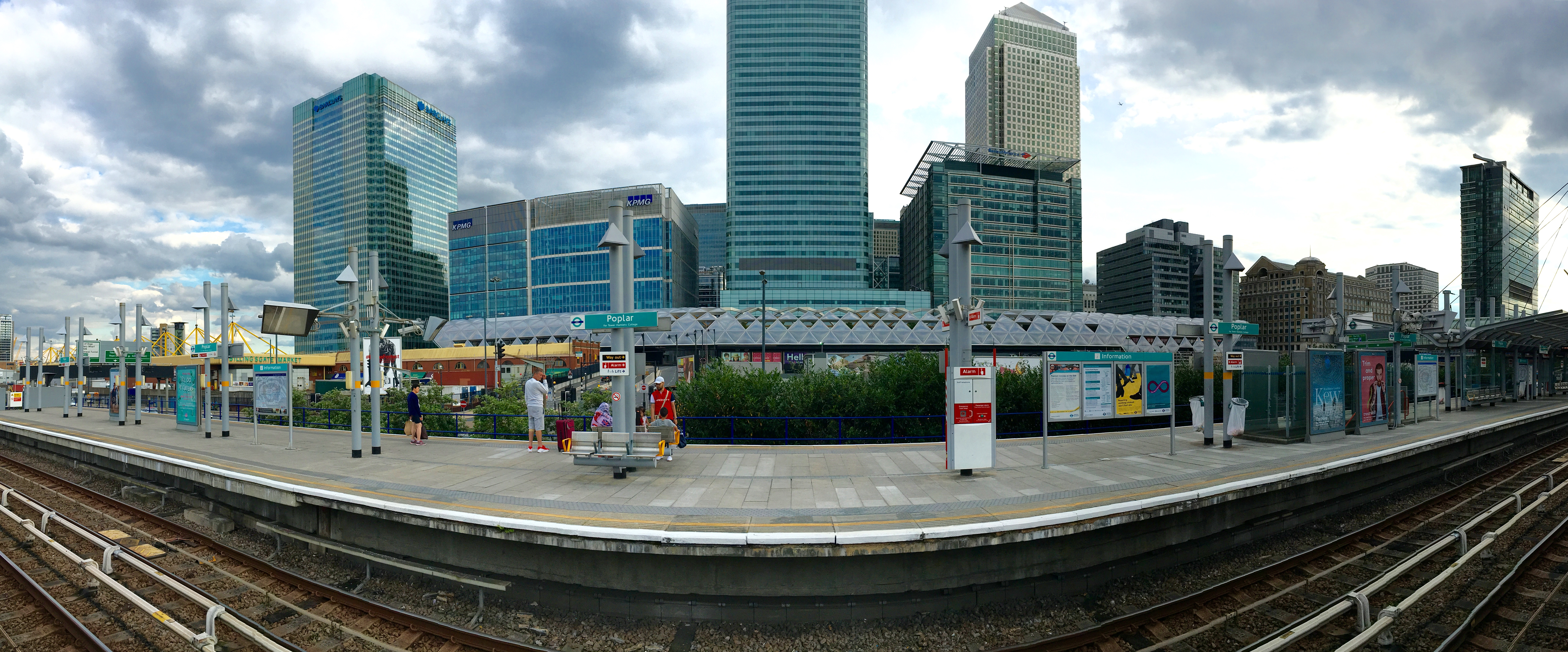
Panoramic view of Poplar station

== Services ==
The typical off-peak service in trains per hour from Poplar is:

- 6 tph to Tower Gateway
- 6 tph to Bank
- 12 tph to Stratford
- 6 tph to Beckton
- 6 tph to Woolwich Arsenal
- 12 tph to Canary Wharf

During the peak hours, the services to Bank, Tower Gateway, Beckton and Woolwich Arsenal are increased up to 8 tph. In addition, the services to Stratford and Canary Wharf are increased up to 16 tph, with up to 8 tph during the peak hours extended beyond Canary Wharf to and from Lewisham.

Preceding station	DLR	Following station
Westferry towards Bank or Tower Gateway	Docklands Light Railway	Blackwall towards Beckton or Woolwich Arsenal
West India Quay towards Lewisham	Docklands Light Railway	All Saints towards Stratford

== Connections ==
London Buses routes 15, 115, D6 and night routes N15 and N551 serve the station.

As part of the construction of the Elizabeth line, Canary Wharf railway station was built and opened in 2022. This enables interchange between DLR and Elizabeth line services.

== See also ==
- Poplar DLR depot
