= West India Quay DLR station =

Docklands Light Railway station

West India Quay
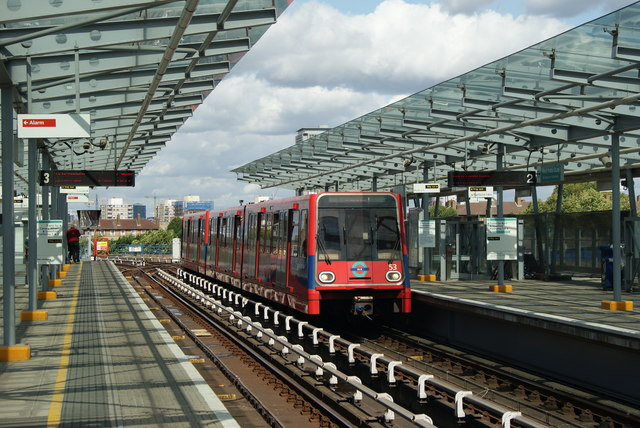
- Platforms in 2009

General information
- Location: Canary Wharf, Tower Hamlets
- Coordinates: 51.50687°N 0.020425°W
- Owned by: Transport for London
- Managed by: Docklands Light Railway
- Platforms: 3
- Connections: Out-of-station interchanges: Canary Wharf

Construction
- Structure type: Elevated
- Accessible: Yes

Other information
- Status: Unstaffed
- Fare zone: 2
- Website: Edit this at Wikidata

History
- Opened: 31 August 1987

Key dates
- 14 October 1991: Closed temporarily
- 28 June 1993: Reopened

Passengers

DLR annual entry and exit
- 2020: ▼0.296 million
- 2021: ▲1.330 million
- 2022: ▲2.810 million
- 2023: ▲3.090 million
- 2024: ▼2.60 million
Location
- Location in Tower Hamlets

West India Quay is a Docklands Light Railway (DLR) station in Canary Wharf’s West India Quay. It is located at the point where the line from Lewisham splits into branches to Tower Gateway/Bank and Stratford. The next stations on each line are Canary Wharf DLR station (to Lewisham), Westferry (to Tower Gateway/Bank) and Poplar DLR station (to Stratford). The station is in London fare zone 2.

== Location and connections ==
West India Quay station is located over the northern half of the dock of the same name in southeast end of Limehouse and is very close to both Poplar and Canary Wharf, and is in the central portion of the London Borough of Tower Hamlets. Situated to the south of Billingsgate Road and Aspen Way (A1261), the station is near the edge of the main Docklands re-development area. The distance from West India Quay DLR to Canary Wharf DLR is just 0.124 miles (199 m), the shortest distance between stations on the entire London Underground and Docklands Light Railway system. Indeed, while standing at the station, the platforms for Canary Wharf are clearly visible just down the line, as is the following station Heron Quays station, from which Canary Wharf and West India Quay are also visible in the opposite direction.

West India Quay is the closest DLR station to the Canary Wharf railway station served by the Elizabeth line.

The station is not served by any London Buses Routes.

As of April 2017 DLR trains from Bank towards Lewisham do not stop at this station, meaning to reach here from the City of London passengers must travel on to Canary Wharf and get the next train in the opposite direction, or travel to Poplar and either change there to travel to West India Quay, or walk the short distance between the stations.

== History ==
The station opened in 1987 but was closed from 1991 to 1993 as the surrounding area was rebuilt. The station is near to the London Museum Docklands and the adjoining hotel and leisure facilities on the north quay of West India Docks, and indeed the platforms of the station extend over part of the dock.

=== Late 2000s upgrades ===
Between March and October 2007 the station's canopy was replaced in a £1.85m project funded by Transport for London. Throughout the project, TfL highlighted the sustainable nature of the project through its use of recycled materials while justifying the replacement as necessary due to the increasingly windy conditions as a result of taller developments nearby.

Construction was completed in May 2009 of a new single track dive-under as part of the current capacity upgrades. A ramp takes trains from Bank to Canary Wharf under the current Canary Wharf to Poplar track. The new track goes around West India Quay, before coming back up to rejoin the route to Canary Wharf. To construct the new track next to West India Quay the easternmost platform (Platform 1) had to be demolished. A consequence of this was, that during construction, trains from Canary Wharf to Poplar and trains from Bank to Canary Wharf had to cross each other at the same level which limited junction capacity.

The work was completed in May 2009, but the bypass track was not commissioned until 24 August 2009. It is used by all trains running from Bank to Lewisham, but trains running in the opposite direction still call at West India Quay even during peak hours.

== Station layout ==
Until the Delta Junction upgrade in 2009, West India Quay used to contain four platforms with four tracks. From west to east (platform 4 to 1) these platforms served trains to Westferry, to Poplar, from Westferry, and Poplar. After reconstruction, the old platform 1 ceased to exist with trains from Westferry diving under the junction and bypassing the station to the east. Trains from Poplar now arrive on platform 2.

== Services ==
The typical off-peak service in trains per hour (tph) from West India Quay is:

- 12 tph to Stratford
- 12 tph to Bank
- 12 tph to Canary Wharf

Services from Bank towards Lewisham do not stop at West India Quay.

Additional services call at the station during the peak hours, increasing the service to Bank to up to 22 tph, and the service between Stratford and Canary Wharf to up to 16 tph in each direction with up to 8 tph during the peak hours extended beyond Canary Wharf to and from Lewisham.

Preceding station	DLR	Following station
Westferry (Westbound only) towards Bank	Docklands Light Railway	Canary Wharf towards Lewisham
Poplar (Eastbound only) towards Stratford	Docklands Light Railway	Canary Wharf towards Lewisham
