= Fosterito =

Entrances to the Bilbao Metro

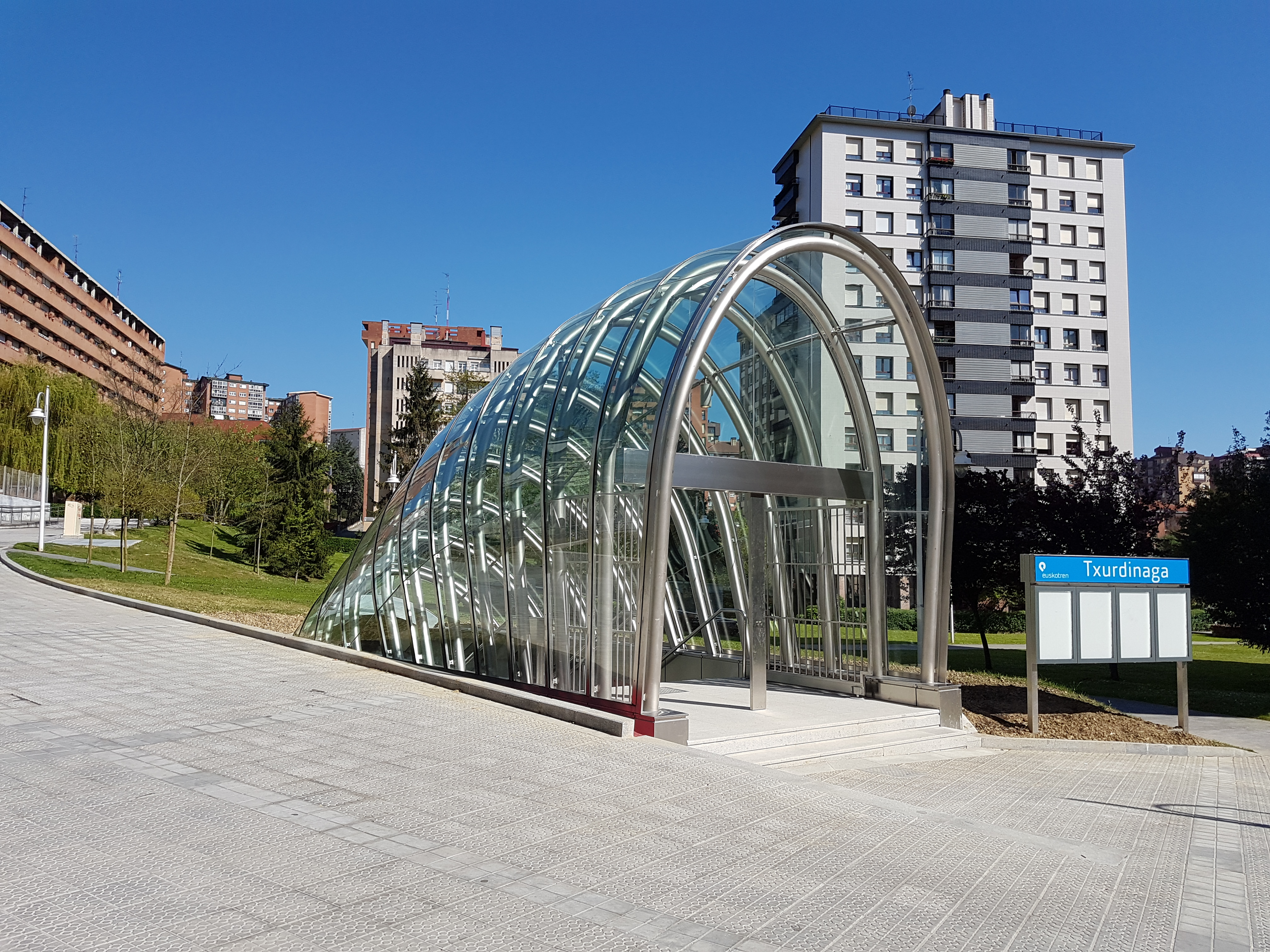
Fosterito at Txurdinaga station

Fosterito (Spanish for 'little Foster') (Basque: Foster Txikia) is the name of a kind of awning which covers many entrances to stations in the Bilbao Metro. These awnings are made with glass and steel. They are named after Norman Foster, who designed the architecture for the stations of the system, as well as their entrances. These entrances can be seen on all three lines of the network.
