= Canary Wharf DLR station =

Railway station in East London, England

Canary Wharf
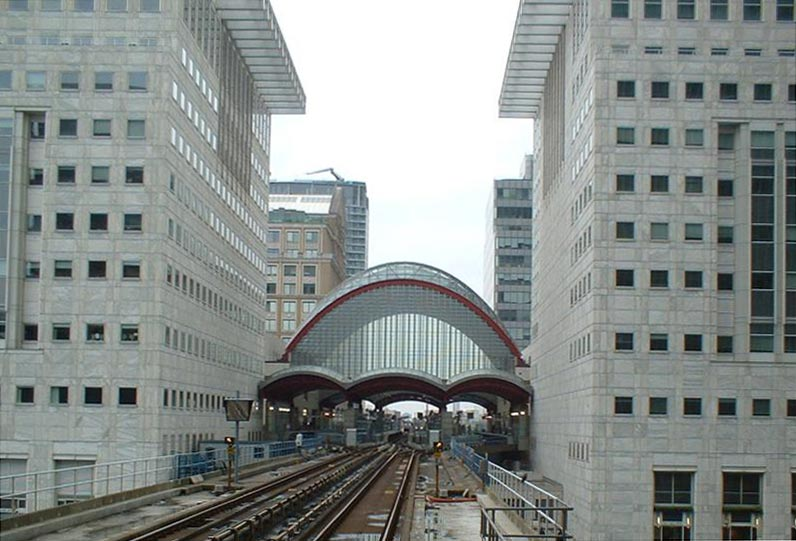
- Station viewed from the south

General information
- Location: Canary Wharf, Tower Hamlets
- Coordinates: 51.5051°N 0.0209°W
- Owner: Transport for London
- Manager: Docklands Light Railway
- Platforms: 6
- Tracks: 3
- Connections: Canary Wharf; Canary Wharf

Construction
- Structure type: Elevated
- Accessible: Yes

Other information
- Status: Unstaffed
- Fare zone: 2
- Website: Official website

History
- Opened: November 1991

Passengers

DLR annual entry and exit
- 2021: ▲6.635 million
- 2022: ▲11.300 million
- 2023: ▲12.710 million
- 2024: ▼11.21 million
- 2025: ▼10.43 million
Location
- Location in Tower Hamlets

Canary Wharf is a Docklands Light Railway (DLR) station in Canary Wharf in East London. Located next to One Canada Square and between two parts of a shopping centre (Cabot Place), it serves the Canary Wharf office complex. Each of its three tracks feature platforms on both sides, allowing for easy interchanges and access to surrounding buildings. The station is sheltered by a distinctive elliptical glass roof.

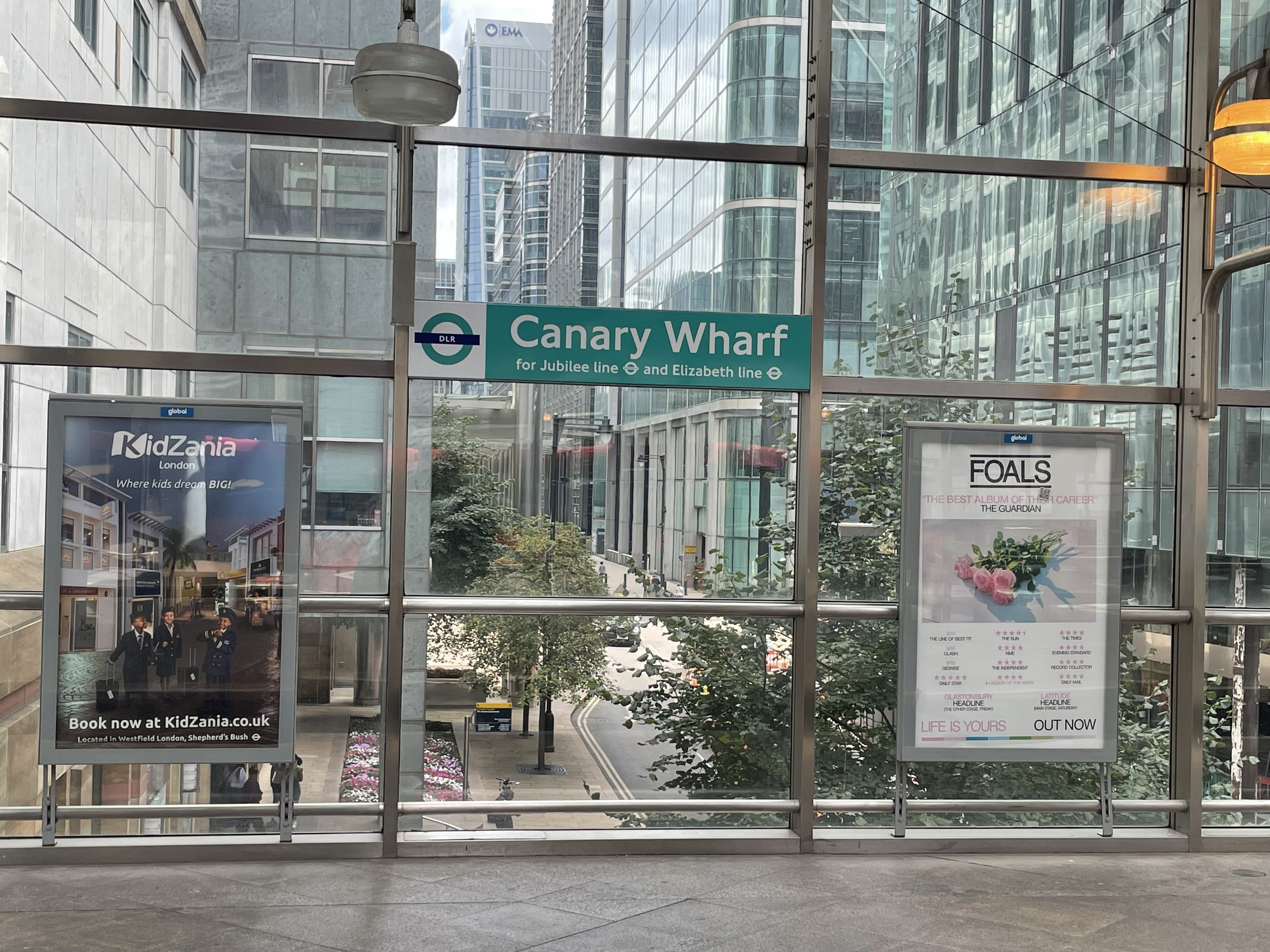
Canary Wharf DLR southbound platform

The station is located on the DLR between Heron Quays station and West India Quay station. Canary Wharf is presently a terminus for the Stratford-Lewisham Line and services now only run to Lewisham in peak hours. The station is shown on the Tube map as being within walking distance of Canary Wharf Underground station; however, Heron Quays DLR station is indicated as closer by around 50 metres. It is also within walking distance of Canary Wharf station on the Elizabeth line, although West India Quay DLR and Poplar DLR stations are considered to be closer.

== History ==
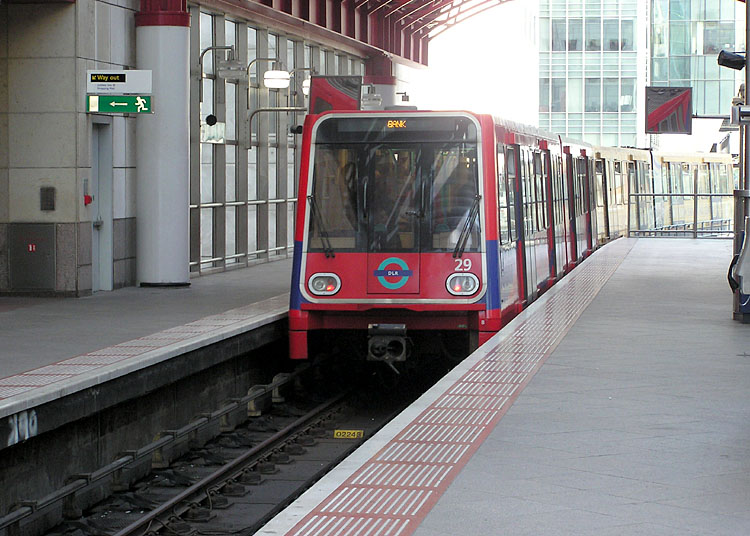
A DLR train leaving Canary Wharf station, heading for Bank

Canary Wharf station had been part of the original DLR plans, but when the system opened in August 1987 the station was not ready. It was originally planned that the station would be similar to the original station at Heron Quays, with two small platforms either side of the tracks. It soon became apparent that the Canary Wharf development would produce demand well above the capacity of a simple station. On 17 July 1987 (over a month before the DLR opened to the public) a contract was awarded to GEC-Mowlem Railway Group to rebuild the station into the considerably more elaborate and spacious design that exists today, which was designed by architect Pelli & Associates with executive architect Adamson Associates (International) Ltd. It was opened in November 1991.

== Services ==
The typical off-peak service in trains per hour from Canary Wharf is:

- 12 tph to Stratford
- 12 tph to Bank
- 12 tph to Lewisham

Off-peak, the 12 tph service to and from Stratford terminates at Canary Wharf.

Additional services call at the station during the peak hours, increasing the service to up to 38 tph in each direction. This includes the service between Bank and Lewisham being increased to up to 22 tph in each direction, and the service to and from Stratford being increased to up to 16 tph, with up to 8 tph being extended beyond Canary Wharf to and from Lewisham.

Preceding station	DLR	Following station
West India Quay towards Bank (westbound) or Stratford	Docklands Light Railway	Heron Quays towards Lewisham
Westferry (eastbound West India Quay Bypass); One-way operation	Docklands Light Railway	Terminus

== Connections ==
London Buses routes 135, 277, D3, D7, D8, SL4 and night routes N277 and N550 serve the station.

== See also ==
- Canary Wharf railway station
- Canary Wharf tube station
