= Canary Wharf railway station =

National rail station in East London, England

Canary Wharf
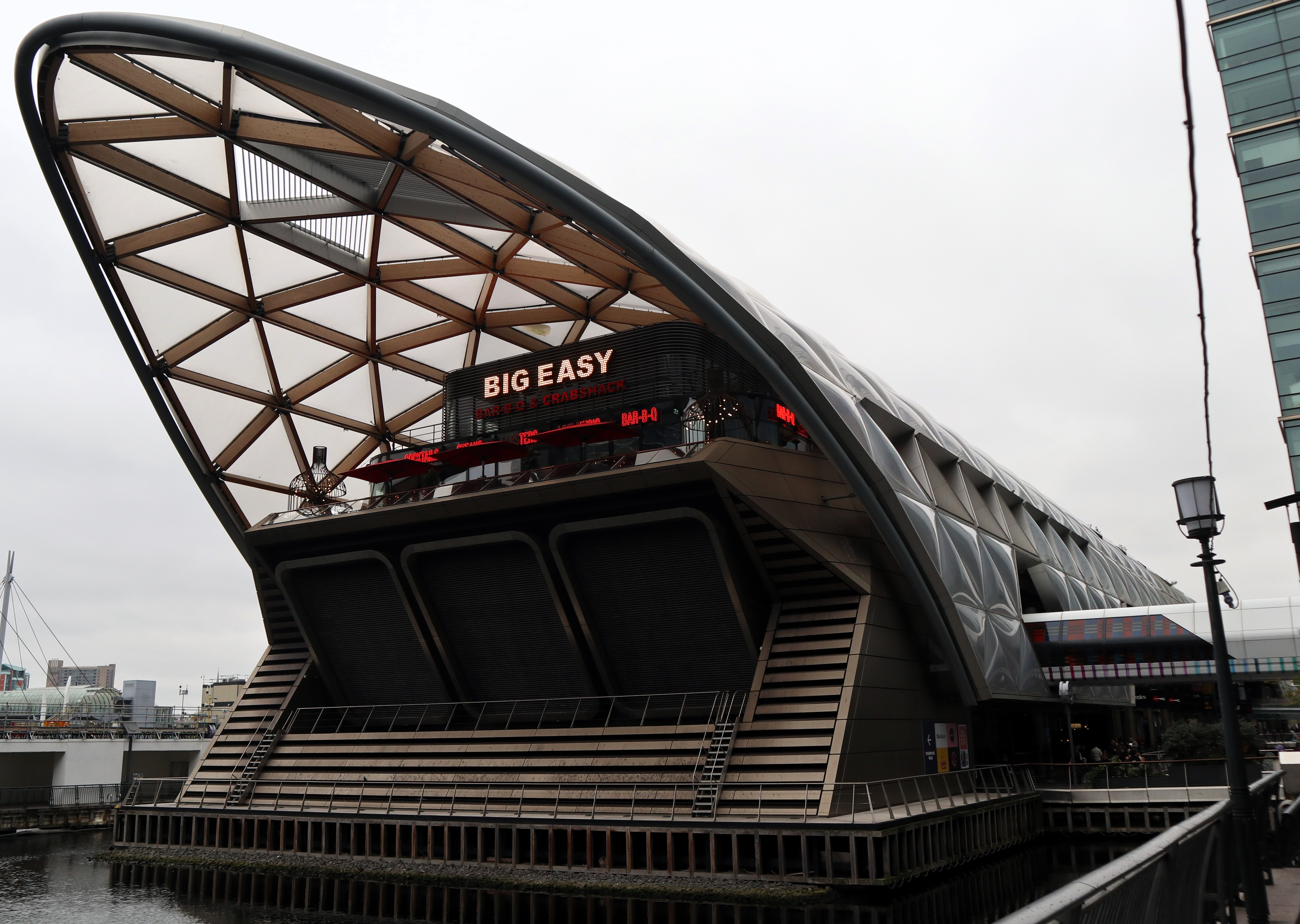
- Crossrail Place seen in April 2024
- Interactive map of Canary Wharf

General information
- Location: Canary Wharf
- Local authority: London Borough of Tower Hamlets
- Managed by: Elizabeth line
- Owner: Transport for London
- Station code: CWX
- Number of platforms: 2
- Fare zone: 2
- OSI: Canary Wharf; Canary Wharf; Poplar; West India Quay

National Rail annual entry and exit
- 2022–23: 9.925 million
- 2023–24: ▲14.787 million
- 2024–25: ▲15.928 million

Key dates
- 24 May 2022: Opened

Other information
- External links: Departures; Facilities
- Coordinates: 51.5061°N 0.01578°W

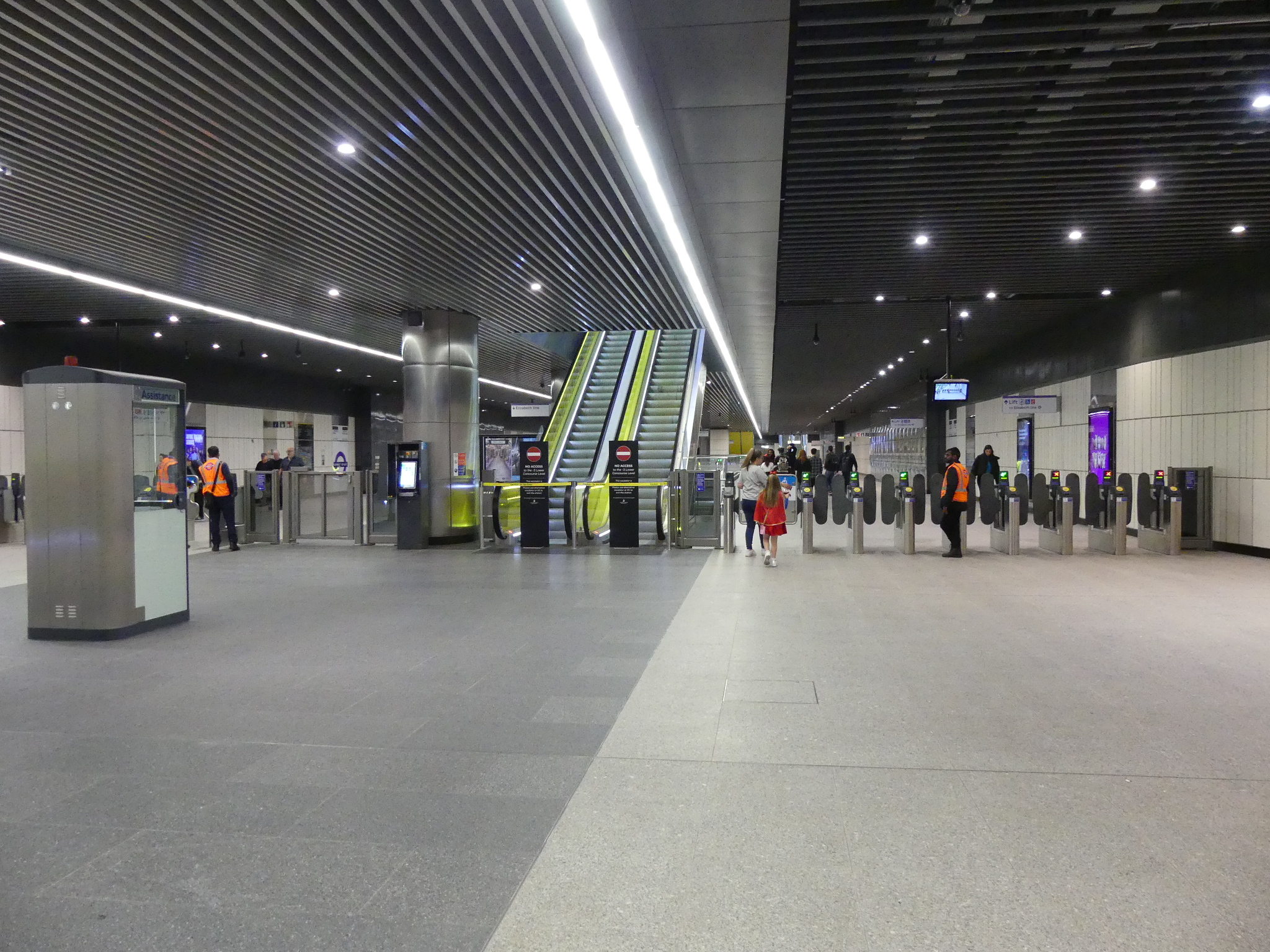
The ticket hall level

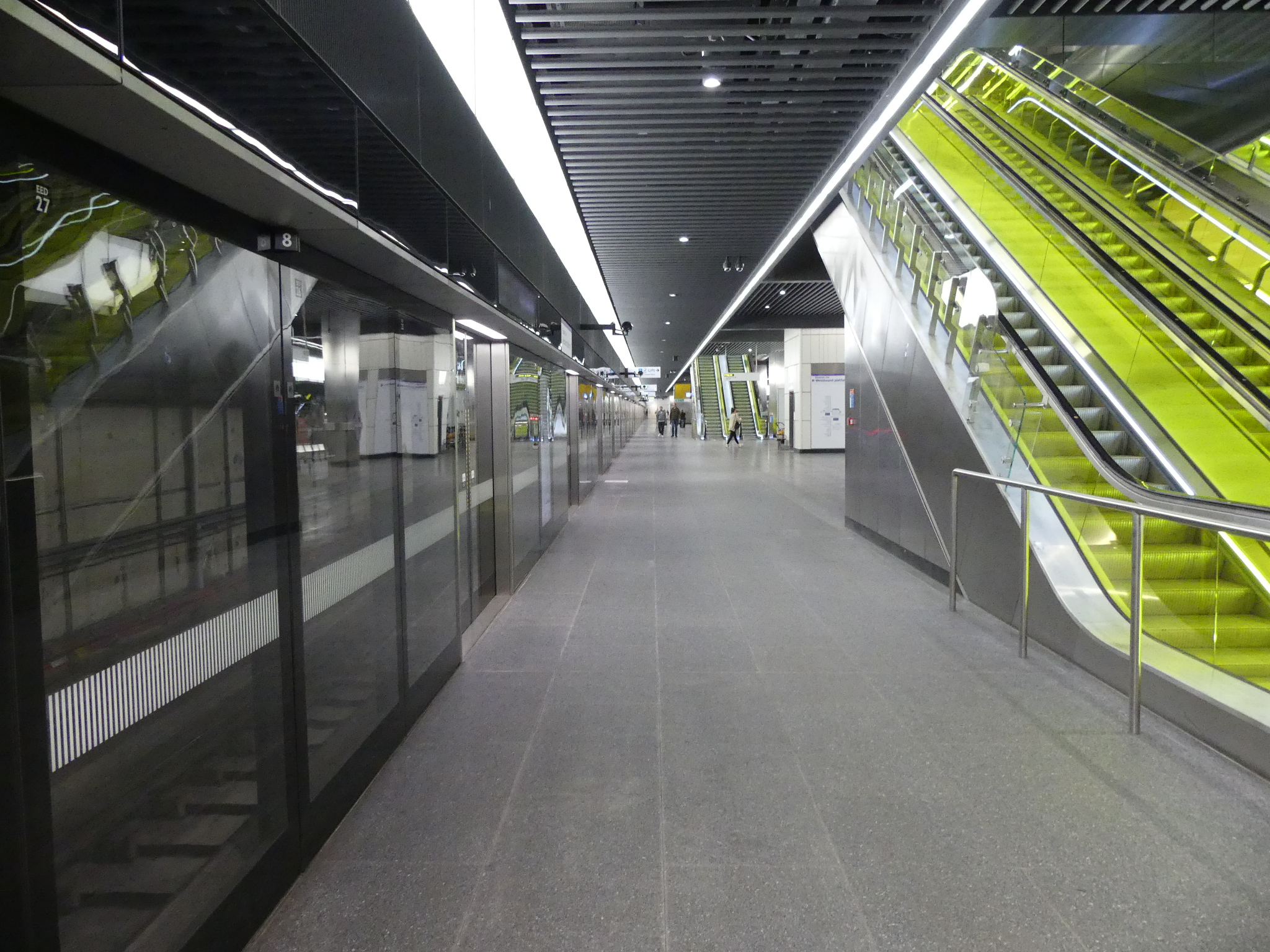
Platforms at Canary Wharf

Canary Wharf is an Elizabeth line station in Canary Wharf on the Isle of Dogs in east London, England. The station forms an artificial island in the West India Docks (North Dock). The five upper levels of the station are a mixed-use development known as Crossrail Place. It is on the Abbey Wood branch of the Elizabeth line between Whitechapel and Custom House. Construction began in May 2009, and the station opened on 24 May 2022 when the section between Paddington and Abbey Wood stations began services. During the project's development the station was named Isle of Dogs, before the current name was adopted. The station was developed under a fixed price contract of £500 million with £350 million provided from the Crossrail budget and £150 million from the Canary Wharf Group with Crossrail spending an additional £80 million on safety improvements before it was opened.

The station is one of the largest on the Elizabeth line, providing Canary Wharf with a connection to the Crossrail network and additionally an interchange with Canary Wharf station on the London Underground as well as Canary Wharf, West India Quay and Poplar stations on the Docklands Light Railway.

== Design and construction ==
The station is located beneath and within the West India North Dock on an artificial island and extends from east of the Docklands Light Railway bridge to the east end of the dock. It stands within a 475-metre (1,558 ft) long concrete box with a 245-metre (804 ft) long island platform. It is fitted out to 210 m (690 ft) with the potential for extension should the need to operate longer trains arise.

=== Original design ===
The main access point for the Crossrail station was initially going to be the rebuilt Great Wharf Bridge. From this entrance there would have been a set of escalators to the concourse level, which would have been located underwater. Another bank of escalators would take passengers to the platforms.

Construction of the station was to predominantly take place on Hertsmere Road, which runs parallel to the West India North Dock. This would have involved digging a 9 m (30 ft) wide shaft to the station depth of 30 m (98 ft) below the dock water-level to enable crew and equipment to begin boring the box that would form the station. The construction including fit-out and commissioning of the Hertsmere Road shaft was expected to take approximately four years whilst the same would take five years for the station.

=== Redesign and construction ===
In December 2008 an extra £150 million of funding from the Canary Wharf Group was announced for the station with work due to commence in January 2009. As part of the deal Canary Wharf Group substantially redesigned the station, incorporating a large shopping centre and a park above the platforms situated in the middle of the dock.

A ground-breaking ceremony for the station development was held on 15 May 2009.

Throughout 2009 the main focus was on installing 293 interlocking steel piles 18.5 m (61 ft) high and 1.2 m (3 ft 11 in) wide into the dock floor using ten-storey high piling cranes and Giken piling machines to form a cofferdam. As part of this, 38 m (125 ft) deep reinforced concrete piles were placed through each of the 293 tubes.

On 11 February 2010 Sadiq Khan, then Transport Minister, activated pumps designed to drain nearly 100 million litres (22,000,000 imp gal; 26,000,000 US gal) from the work site over the following six weeks. The pumps transferred water from inside the site's cofferdam to the North Dock at a maximum rate of 13,500 litres (3,000 imp gal; 3,600 US gal) per minute.

A station 'box' was constructed in a dry environment in a similar technique to that used in the construction of the nearby Canary Wharf Underground station. Crossrail Place is the structure above the platforms and was partly opened on 1 May 2015. In September 2015, the station construction was completed and the focus has shifted to fitting the station screen doors, ticket machines and other things before the station is scheduled for opening.

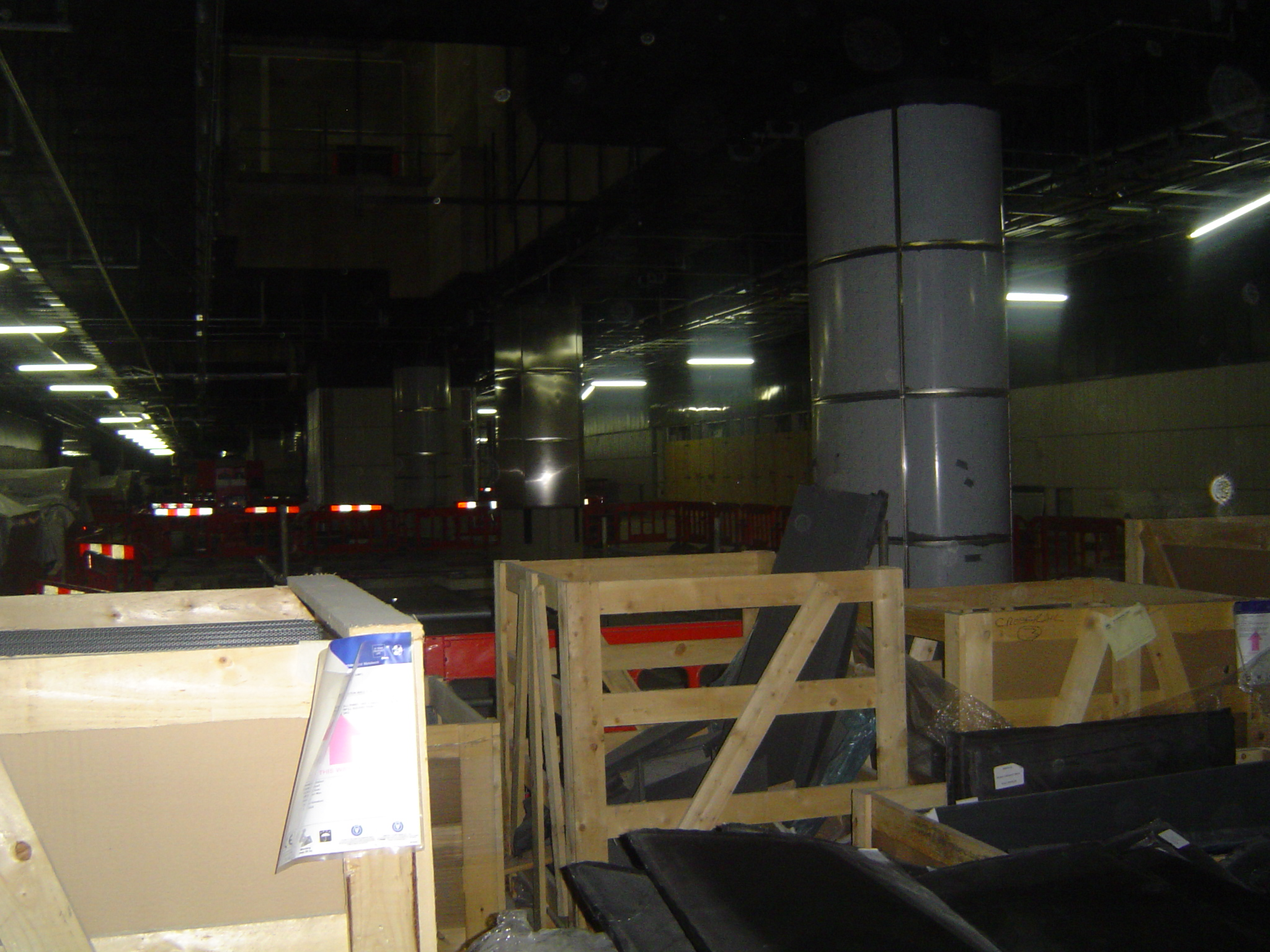
Canary Wharf Ticket Hall level while under construction. This photo was taken during an Open House London Event in 2013.

The station project became the subject of a dispute between Crossrail and developer Canary Wharf Group after Crossrail chief executive Mark Wild said work was inadequate. The station "had to have a wholesale retrofit, particularly in the safety systems," and Wild said the station required an extra £80m to fix. Canary Wharf Group dismissed the comments as "an attempt to pass blame for the delays on Crossrail". Wild said: "The key issues [at Canary Wharf] have been the quality of the electrical installation [redacted phrase] and the extensive safety critical upgrade work that has been required." The work was completed and handed over in January 2022, ahead of the official opening as part of the beginning of services between Paddington and Abbey Wood on 24 May 2022.

== Ownership ==
Whilst the Elizabeth line operates services at the station as a train operating company and forms a part of National Rail, all infrastructure is owned and maintained by Transport for London and not by Network Rail.

== Services ==
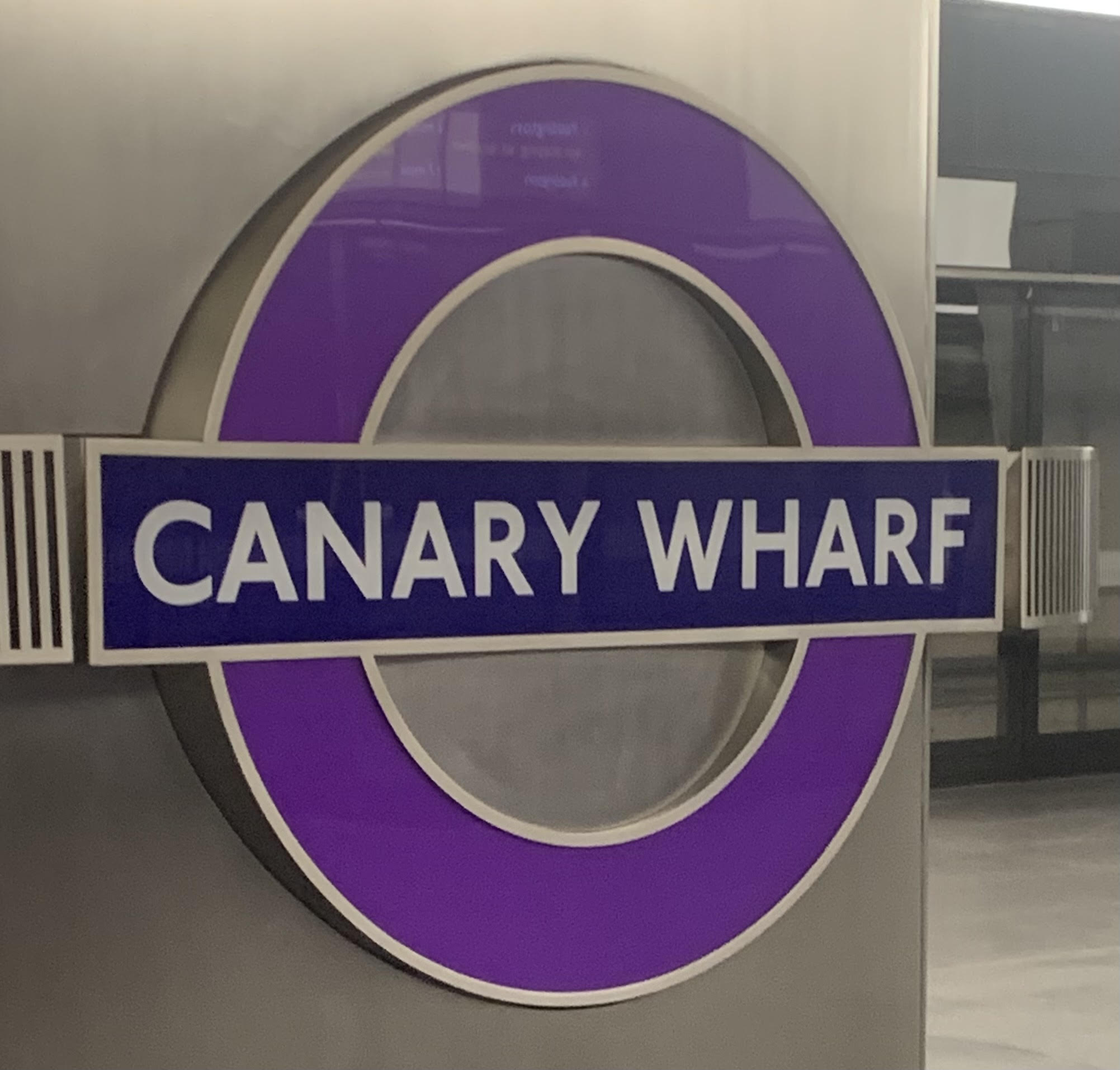
Elizabeth line roundel at Canary Wharf

All services at Canary Wharf are operated by the Elizabeth line using Class 345 EMUs.

The typical off-peak service in trains per hour is:

- 8 tph to Abbey Wood
- 4 tph to Maidenhead of which 2 continue to Reading
- 4 tph to Heathrow Terminal 4

Additional services call at the station during the peak hours, increasing the service to up to 12 tph in each direction.

Preceding station	Elizabeth line	Following station
Whitechapel towards Reading or Heathrow Terminal 4	Elizabeth line	Custom House towards Abbey Wood
