= London Buses route 277 =

London bus route

277
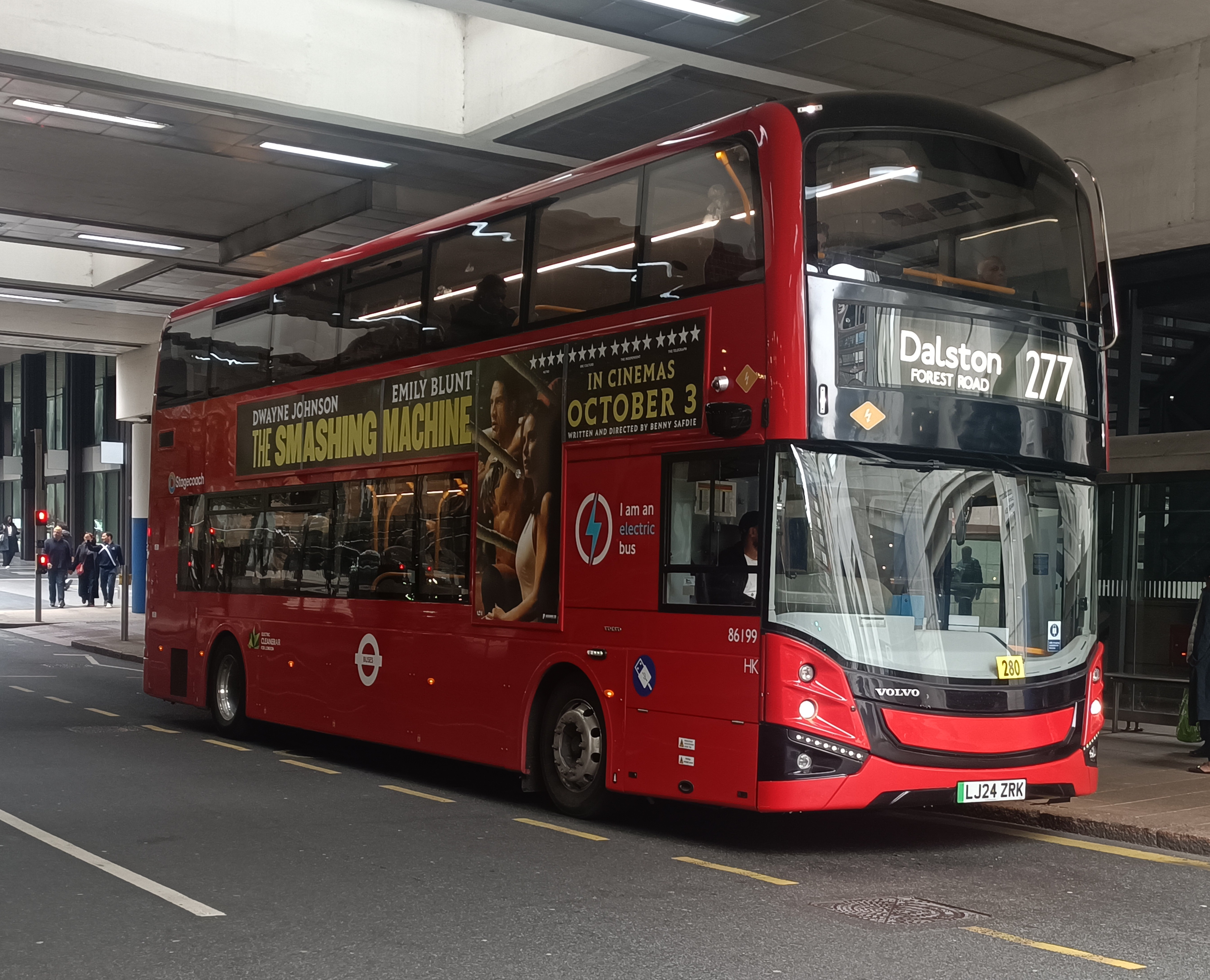
- East London MCV D113 EV bodied Volvo BZL at Canary Wharf station in September 2025

Overview
- Operator: East London (Stagecoach London)
- Garage: Ash Grove
- Night-time: N277

Route
- Start: Cubitt Town
- Via: Millwall; Canary Wharf; Westferry; Limehouse; Mile End; Hackney Central
- End: Dalston

London Buses route 277 is a Transport for London contracted bus route in London, England. Running between Cubitt Town and Dalston, it is operated by Stagecoach London subsidiary East London.

== History ==
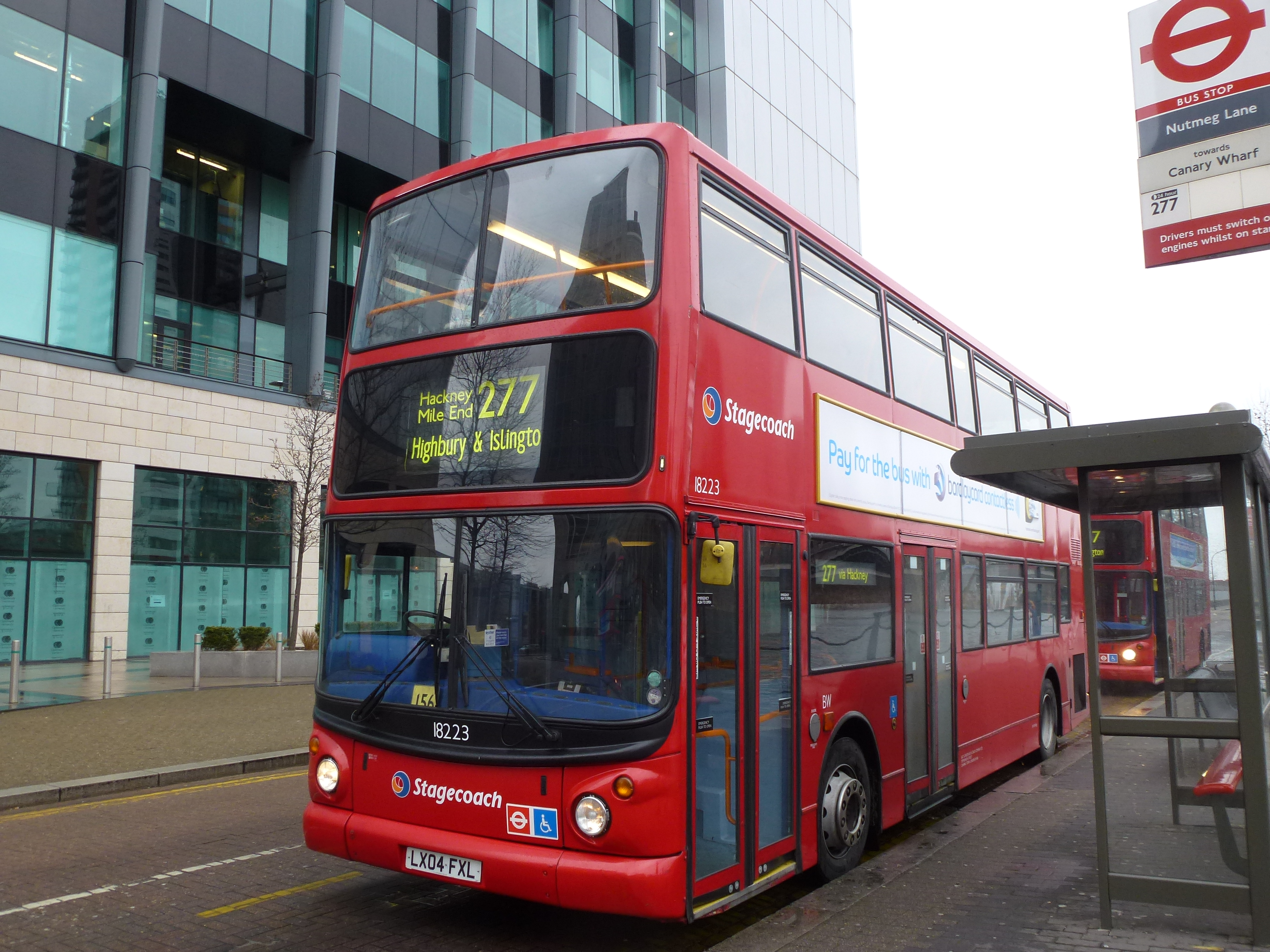
East London TransBus ALX400 bodied TransBus Trident in Leamouth in April 2013

Route 277 started in April 1959 to replace the Trolleybus route 677 from Smithfield to Cubitt Town. In October 1961 the Sunday service was extended from Cubitt Town to Poplar replacing the withdrawn route 56. In 1964 Saturday journeys were also extended, and this was followed in 1969 by a weekday extension.

In 1971 route 277 saw the withdrawal on Sunday services between Angel and Smithfield but continued a normal service to the Blackwall Tunnel. The 277 saw the withdrawal of through services to Poplar and restricted to Cubitt Town, Queen Hotel in 1974, during the reconstruction of what is now the Blue Bridge over the West India Dock entrance from the River Thames, passengers walking over a temporary footbridge until 1976 after Route 277A, a shuttle from the north side of the bridge to Poplar, was withdrawn.

The 1990s saw the most significant change to the route where the 277 lost it status as a Central London route as was diverted at Canonbury (Mildmay Park) via St Pauls Road to Highbury & Islington Station; the Smithfield section was replaced by bus route 56. 1991 saw the extension on weekdays and Saturdays to Canary Wharf. 1993 saw the withdrawal of the section between Canary Wharf and Poplar. In 1994 the route was extended to Blackwall on weekdays and Saturdays. The route also saw the extension to Leamouth on Sundays along with the N277 in 2003 being introduced that covered the entire route.

As part of the new 24 hour buses project in 2004, the 'N277' dropped as this was routed exactly the same as the day route, making the 277 a 24-hour route.

In February 2009, drivers on the route were criticised by local residents for causing unnecessarily high noise and air pollution at the Highbury Corner terminus.

East London commenced a new contract in February 2010. In March 2016, Transport for London proposed the removal of seven bus stops from the route, which drew criticism from London TravelWatch.

On 30 June 2018, route 277 was withdrawn between Dalston and Highbury Corner. However the night service was retained, restoring the 'N' prefix N277 which was extended to Islington via Upper Street from Highbury. This decision was met with outrage from Hackney Borough Council who were disappointed with TfL and called on the Mayor of London Sadiq Khan and TfL to review this decision.

== Current route ==
Route 277 operates via these primary locations:

- Cubitt Town Asda
- Mudchute station
- Millwall
- Canary Wharf station
- Canary Wharf Westferry Circus
- Westferry station
- Limehouse
- Mile End station
- South Hackney
- Hackney Central station
- Dalston Junction station
- Dalston Forest Road

== Cultural significance ==
The route is notable for passing through areas of London with strong cultural importance. A feature in Time Out magazine in March 2009 highlighted notable points along the route as the Vortex Jazz Club and Café Oto in Dalston, the Hackney Empire theatre, Broadway Market, London Fields and One Canada Square in Canary Wharf.
