= Canary Wharf tube station =

London Underground station

Canary Wharf
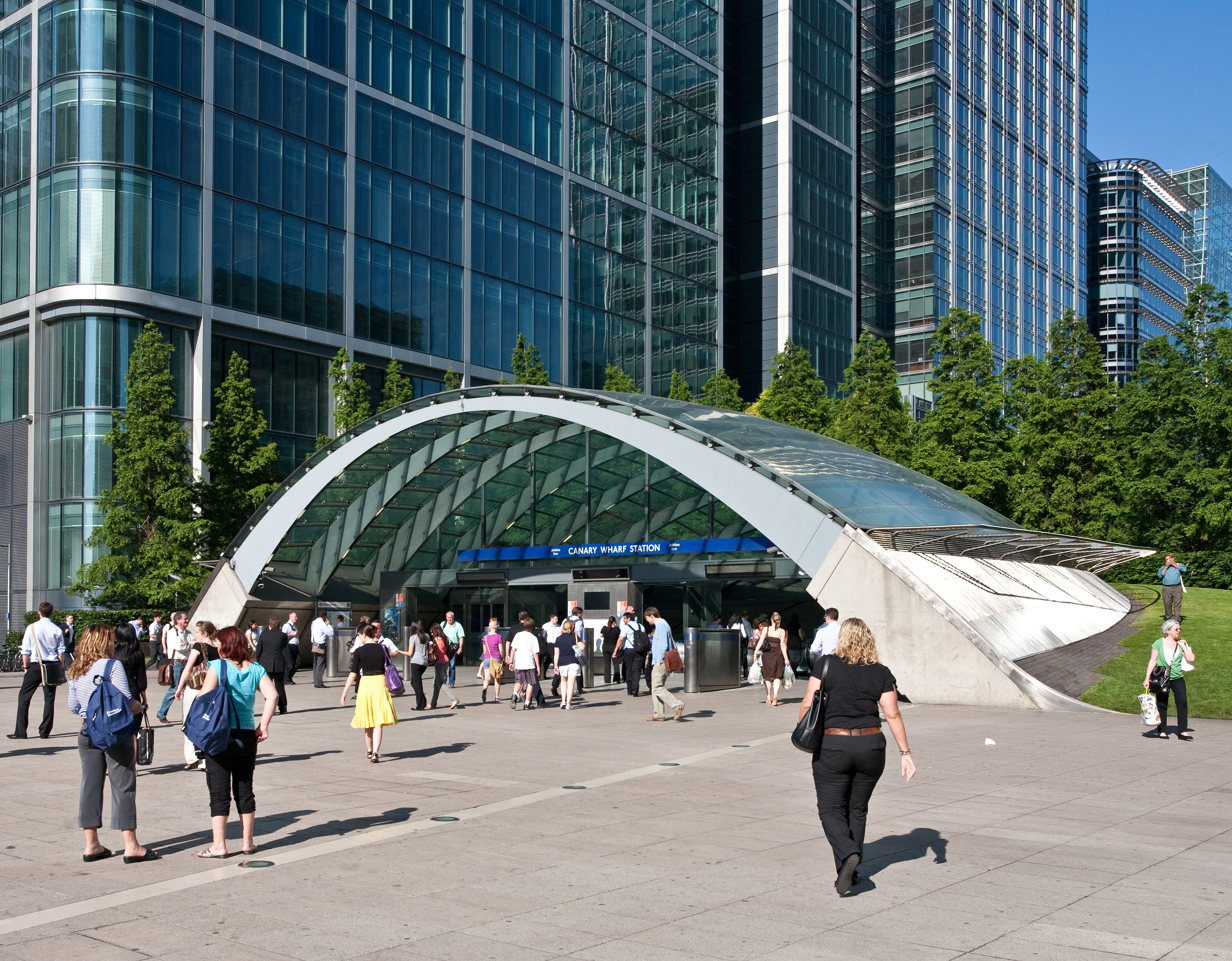
- Station entrance
- Interactive map of Canary Wharf

General information
- Location: Canary Wharf
- Local authority: London Borough of Tower Hamlets
- Managed by: London Underground
- Owner: Transport for London
- Number of platforms: 2
- Accessible: Yes
- Fare zone: 2
- OSI: Canary Wharf; Canary Wharf; Heron Quays

London Underground annual entry and exit
- 2021: ▲18.29 million
- 2022: ▲30.68 million
- 2023: ▲30.87 million
- 2024: ▲31.79 million
- 2025: ▲32.55 million

Railway companies
- Original company: London Regional Transport

Key dates
- September 17, 1999: Opened

Other information
- External links: TfL station info page
- Coordinates: 51.503°N 0.018°W

Canary Wharf is a London Underground station at Canary Wharf. It is on the Jubilee line, between Canada Water and North Greenwich stations. It is in London fare zone 2.

The station was opened on 17 September 1999 as part of the Jubilee Line Extension. Over 40 million people pass through the station each year, making it second busiest on the London Underground outside Central London after Stratford, and also the busiest that serves only a single line. (Note: The DLR station is a completely separate station itself, as is the Elizabeth Line station.)

== History ==
Before the arrival of the Jubilee line, London's Docklands had suffered from relatively poor public transport. Although the Docklands Light Railway station at Canary Wharf had been operating since 1987, by 1990 it was obvious that the DLR's capacity would soon be reached. The Jubilee line's routing through Canary Wharf was intended to relieve some of this pressure.

The tube station was intended from the start to be the showpiece of the Jubilee Line Extension, and the contract for its design was awarded in 1990 to the architect Sir Norman Foster. It was constructed, by a Tarmac Construction / Bachy UK Joint Venture, in a drained arm of the former dock, using a simple "cut and cover" method to excavate an enormous pit 24 metres (78 ft) deep and 265 metres (869 ft) long. The station was opened on 17 September 1999. In 2004, three additional entrances to the station were opened, increasing the station capacity.

The size of the interior has led to it being compared to a cathedral, and it has even been used to celebrate a wedding. Foster based the design upon previous work done for the Bilbao Metro, colloquially named "Fosteritos". However, the main reason for the station's enormous dimensions was the great number of passengers predicted; as many as 50,000 daily. It remains the only tube station to accommodate rush hour demand. These predictions have been outgrown, with as many as 69,759 on weekdays recorded in 2006 and within a decade it had become the only station outside of Zone 1 to be ranked within the top-ten most used stations.

Canary Wharf station and the Jubilee line Extension itself were partly funded by the owners of the Canary Wharf complex, to make it more accessible to commuters. The Canary Wharf group had committed to £500 million of funding for the capital costs, over 24 years. They were, however, underwhelmed by the proposed service frequency. Only five years after the construction of the extension, capacity issues started becoming apparent and upgrades were required. The first step was the lengthening of the trains from 6 to 7 cars. This was done at the end of 2005. The second step was to replace the conventional Jubilee line signalling with the Thales S40 moving-block system. This was eventually introduced into service during 2011 after many delays and teething problems and allows a more intensive timetable to operate with 30 trains per hour running in the peaks.

In a 2013 poll conducted by YouGov, it was voted as the "Most Loved" tube station in London and "despite its immense volume [it is] comfortable and inviting". Five years after opening, a study concluded that the new station had increased land values by £2 billion.

In January 2019, a person died after falling from an escalator; this led to the station being temporarily closed.

== Awards and accreditations ==
In the year 2000, Canary Wharf Tube Station received seven architecture awards:

- AIA UK Design Awards (2000) – Commendation
- Civic Trust Award (2000)
- The National Lighting Design Awards (2000) – Distinction
- Royal Institute of British Architects (RIBA) Architecture Award (2000)
- Royal Fine Art Commission Trust – Building of the Year Award (2000)
- Railway Forum/Modern Railways – Industry Innovation Award (2000)
- British Construction Industry Awards (BCIA) – Special Award (2000)
- World Architecture Awards (2001) – Best Transport/ Infrastructure Building

== The station today ==
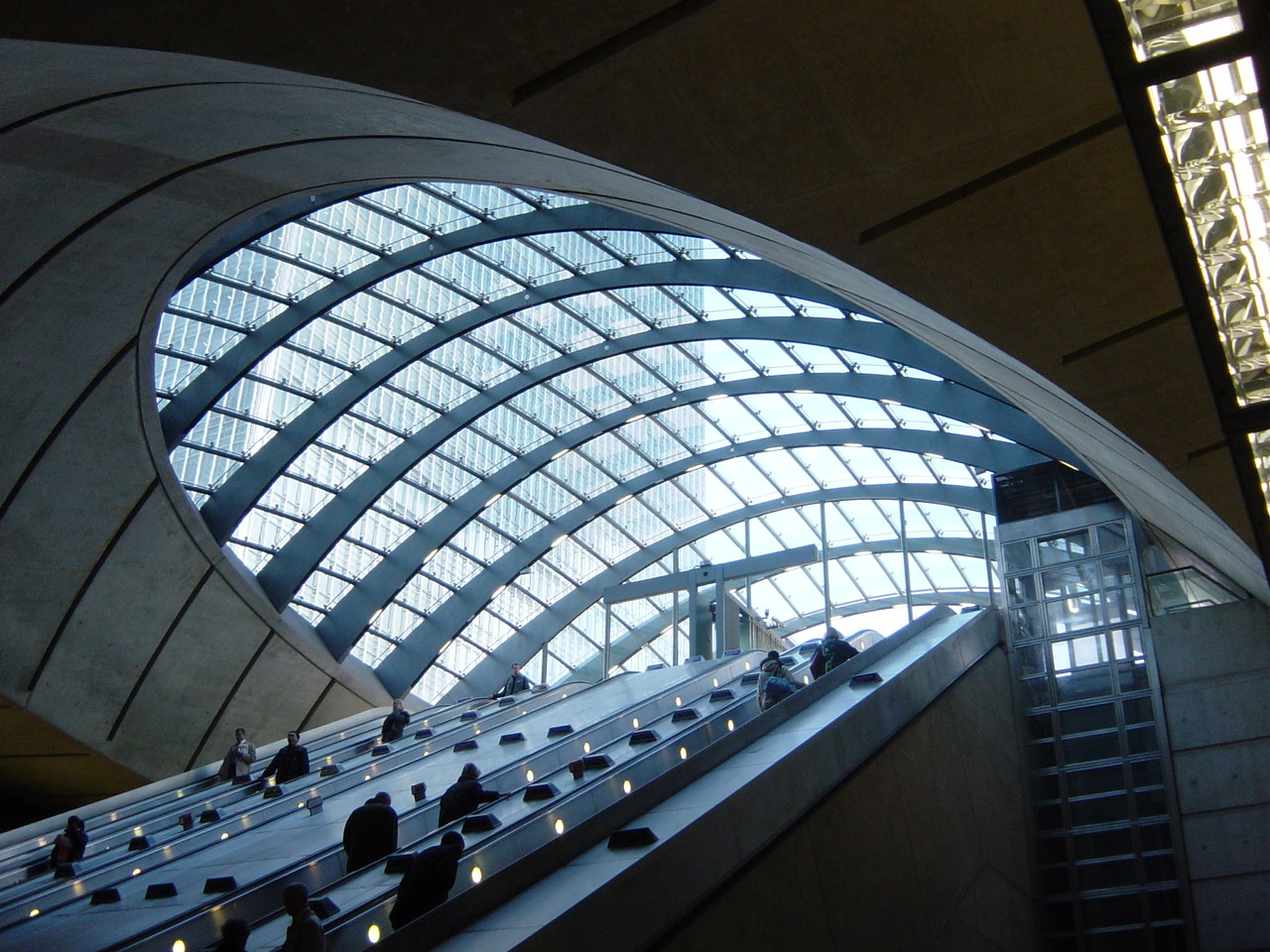
Curved glass canopy over the entrance

Above ground there is little sign of the vast interior: two curved glass canopies at the east and west ends of the station cover the entrances and allow daylight into the ticket hall below. The Jubilee Park, a public park is situated between the two canopies, above the station concourse. It had originally been intended that the infilled section of the dock would be reinstated above the station, but this proved impractical because of technical difficulties and the park was created instead.

As with the other below-ground stations on the Jubilee Line extension, both station platforms are equipped with platform screen doors. There are 20 escalators and 3 lifts serving the 2 platforms.

Canary Wharf station has become one of the busiest stations on the network, serving the ever-expanding Canary Wharf business district. Although it shares its name with the Docklands Light Railway station at Canary Wharf, the two are not directly integrated (in fact, Heron Quays DLR station is nearer at street level). Initially, a direct interchange between the DLR had been hoped for, but development in the intervening years had prevented this goal. All three stations are connected via shopping malls underneath Jubilee Park, Cabot Square and Canada Square. Out-of-station interchange within twenty minutes between any two of the stations entails no additional charge. On 24 May 2022, the Canary Wharf railway station on the Elizabeth line was opened.

Canary Wharf can be used to reverse trains from both the east and the west. A scissors crossover west of the station allows trains from Stanmore to enter either the east- or west-bound platform at the station, and trains from Stratford enter the normal westbound platform and can use this scissors crossover to reverse back towards Stratford.

== Services ==
Canary Wharf station is on the Jubilee line in London fare zone 2. It is between Canada Water to the west and North Greenwich to the east. The typical off-peak service, in trains per hour (tph) is:

- Final 24tph eastbound to Stratford
- 1st 12tph westbound to Stanmore
- 2nd 4tph westbound to Wembley Park
- 3rd 4tph westbound to Willesden Green
- Final 4tph westbound to West Hampstead

Night Tube services, running on Friday and Saturday nights, were introduced in October 2016. Trains run every 10 minutes on the entire line.

- Final 6tph Stanmore – Stratford

== Future proposals ==
Canary Wharf Group (CWG) has called for the Bakerloo line extension to Lewisham to be diverted to Surrey Quays and Canary Wharf from Old Kent Road, before running to Charlton, CWG suggest the current Jubilee Line not being able to cope with demand from the yet to be approved new Canada Water scheme. CWG has also proposed a new underground line between Euston and Canary Wharf which is being considered by the government.

== In popular culture ==
On 9 January 2013, the station appeared on a £1.28 British postage stamp as part of a set commemorating the 150th anniversary of the first London underground train journey. The stamp's captions read "Jubilee Line at Canary Wharf" and "1999". The Canary Wharf stamp represented the most modern phase of the Underground in the set of six stamps.

The station was used as a filming location for some scenes of Danny Boyle's 2002 film 28 Days Later, and its 2007 sequel 28 Weeks Later. In April 2016, Canary Wharf station was used as a filming location for an Imperial base in the Star Wars film Rogue One. The location shoot took place between midnight and 4 am, when the station was closed to the public, and was commented on by Star Wars fans using Twitter.

The station is also seen in the 2003 film Love Actually, the 2005 film The Constant Gardener, the 2024 film A Quiet Place: Day One, and the 2026 film Masters of the Universe.

== Connections ==
The station is served by day and nighttime London Buses routes.

== See also ==
- Canary Wharf DLR station
- Canary Wharf railway station

Preceding station	London Underground	Following station
Canada Water towards Stanmore	Jubilee line	North Greenwich towards Stratford
