= West India Quay =

Area in London Docklands

Coordinates: 51°30′24″N 0°1′20″W

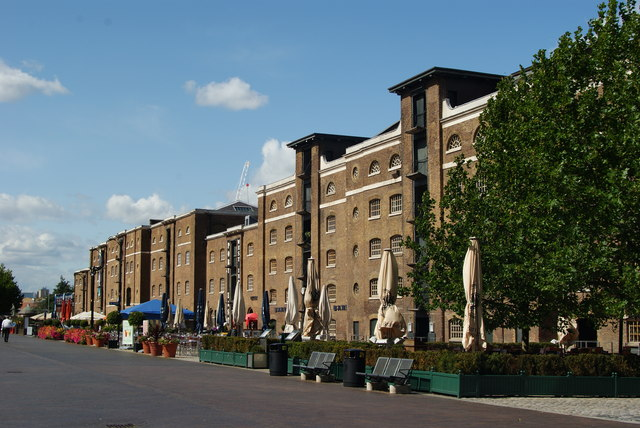
- The front of West India Quay

- Location within Greater London
- OS grid reference: TQ375802
- London borough: Tower Hamlets
- Ceremonial county: Greater London
- Region: London
- Country: England
- Sovereign state: United Kingdom
- Post town: LONDON
- Postcode district: E14
- Police: Metropolitan
- Fire: London
- Ambulance: London
- UK Parliament: Poplar and Limehouse
- London Assembly: City and East

West India Quay is an area in the London Docklands, London, England. It is immediately to the north of the West India Docks and Canary Wharf. The warehouse at West India Quay was used to store imported goods from the West Indies, such as tea, sugar and rum, and is now a Grade I listed building.

== Amenities ==
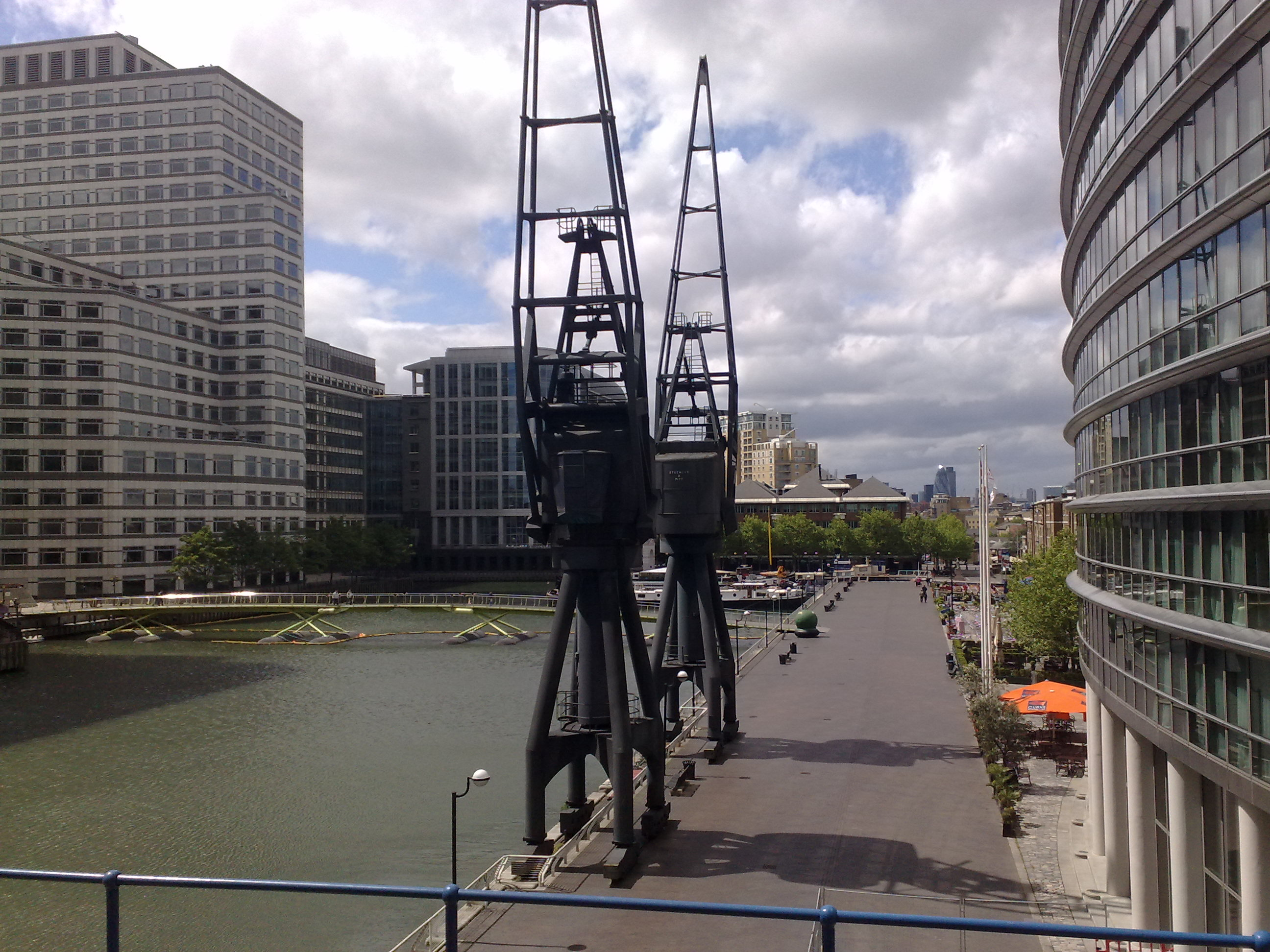
West India Quay

Museum of London Docklands is in West India Quay, inside one of the two remaining traditional brick warehouses in the West India Docks, as is 1 West India Quay. The West India Quay DLR station serves the area.

There is a Cineworld cinema, a Marriott hotel and several restaurants facing the water.

== Transport ==
The north dock of the West India Docks adjacent to the district has been partially drained as part of the construction of Crossrail and new station is being built at the dock (linking to the West India Quay DLR station). The SS Robin and the Steam Tug Portwey have been moved away from the dock as a result of the works.

On 22 April 1991, two Docklands Light Railway trains collided at a junction on the West India Quay bridge during morning rush hour, requiring a shutdown of the entire system and evacuation of the involved passengers by ladder. One of the two trains was travelling automatically, operating without a driver, while the other was under manual control.
