= Baltic region =

Geographical region in Europe

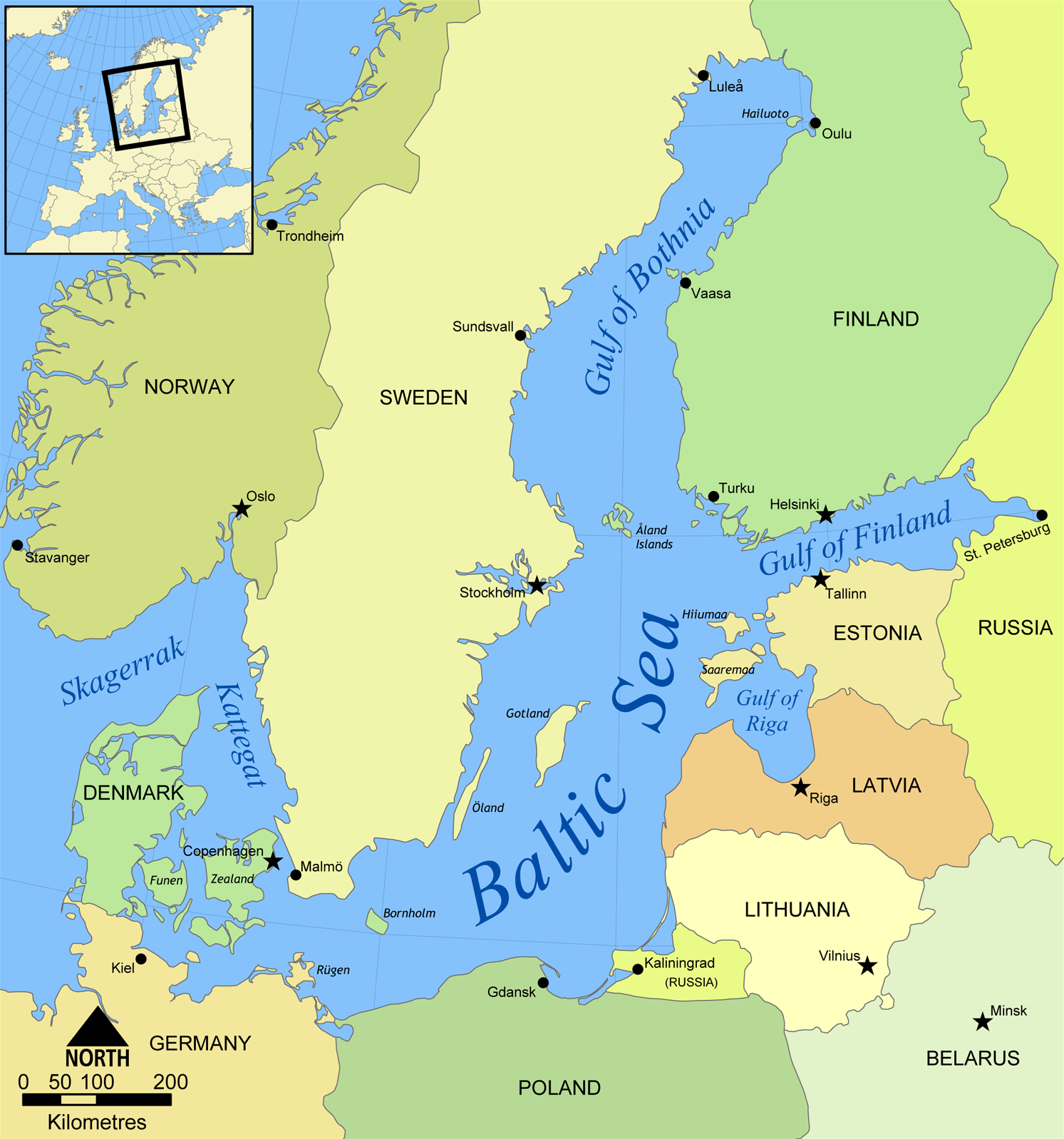
Countries surrounding the Baltic Sea

The Baltic Sea Region, also known as the Baltic Rim countries (or simply the Baltic Rim), and the Baltic Sea countries/states, refers to the general area surrounding the Baltic Sea, including parts of Northern, Central and Eastern Europe. Unlike the "Baltic states", the Baltic region includes all countries that border the sea.

== Toponymy ==
The first to name it the Baltic Sea (Latin: Mare Balticum) was 11th century German chronicler Adam of Bremen.

== Denotation ==
Depending on the context the Baltic Sea Region might stand for:

- The countries that have shorelines along the Baltic Sea: Denmark, Estonia, Finland, Germany, Latvia, Lithuania, Poland, Russia, and Sweden.
- The group of countries that are members of the inter-governmental Baltic Assembly and Baltic Council of Ministers, and generally referred to by the shorthand, Baltic states: Estonia, Latvia, and Lithuania.
- Estonia, Latvia, Lithuania and Kaliningrad Oblast of Russia, exclaved from the remainder of Russia.
- Historic East Prussia and the historical lands of Livonia, Courland and Estonia (Swedish Estonia and Russian Estonia).
- The former Baltic governorates of Imperial Russia: Today's Estonia and Latvia (excluding parts of modern Eastern Latvia that were part of Vitebsk Governorate).
- The countries on the historical British trade route through the Baltic Sea, i.e. including the Scandinavian Peninsula (Sweden and Norway).
- The negotiating members of the Grand Baltic Entente also known as the Baltic League: Finland, Estonia, Latvia, Lithuania, Poland.
- Members of the Council of the Baltic Sea States (CBSS), are the countries (Note: State members of CBSS: Denmark, Estonia, Finland, Germany, Iceland, Latvia, Lithuania, Norway, Poland, Russia and Sweden.) with shorelines along the Baltic Sea, in addition to Norway, Iceland and the European Commission.
- The islands of the Euroregion B7 Baltic Islands Network, which includes the islands and archipelagos Åland (autonomous region of Finland), Bornholm (Denmark), Gotland (Sweden), Hiiumaa (Estonia), Öland (Sweden), Rügen (Germany), and Saaremaa (Estonia).
- On historic Scandinavian and German maps, the Balticum sometimes includes only the historically or culturally German-dominated lands, or provinces, of Estonia, Livonia, Courland and Latgale (corresponding to modern Estonia and Latvia), East Prussia, Samogitia (corresponding to modern Western Lithuania) as well as sometimes Pomerania, Kashubia, while the historically less-Germanized Eastern Lithuania is occasionally excluded.
- In geology, the Baltic Shield includes Fennoscandia, parts of northwestern Russia and the northern Baltic Sea.

== See also ==
- Baltia (Roman mythology)
- Baltic states
- Baltoscandia
- Council of the Baltic Sea States
- List of Intangible Cultural Heritage elements in Northern Europe
- Nordic identity in Estonia
- Northern Dimension
- North Sea Region
