= Docklands Light Railway B23 Stock =

Passenger train class

B23 Stock
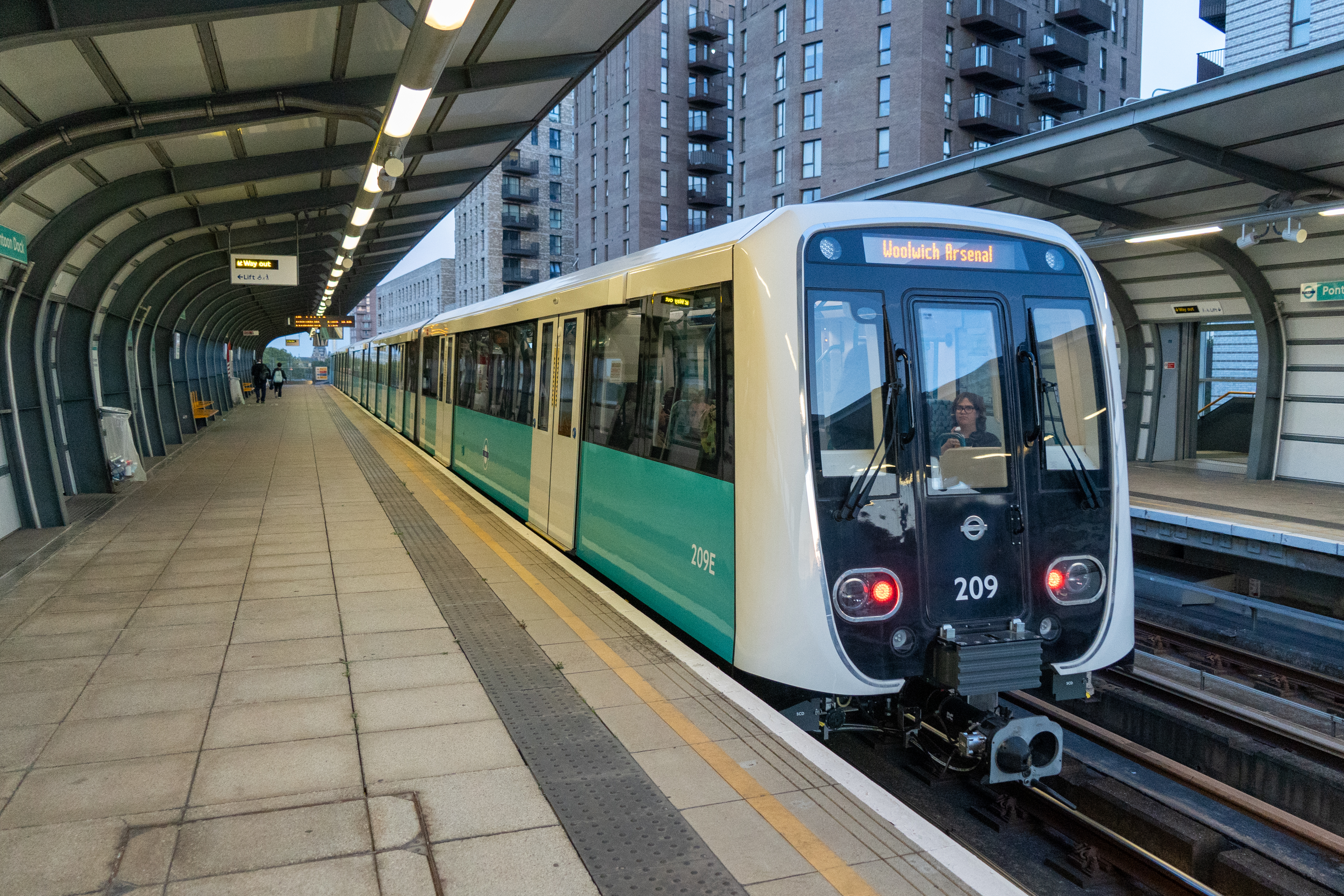
- B23 Stock at Pontoon Dock in 2025

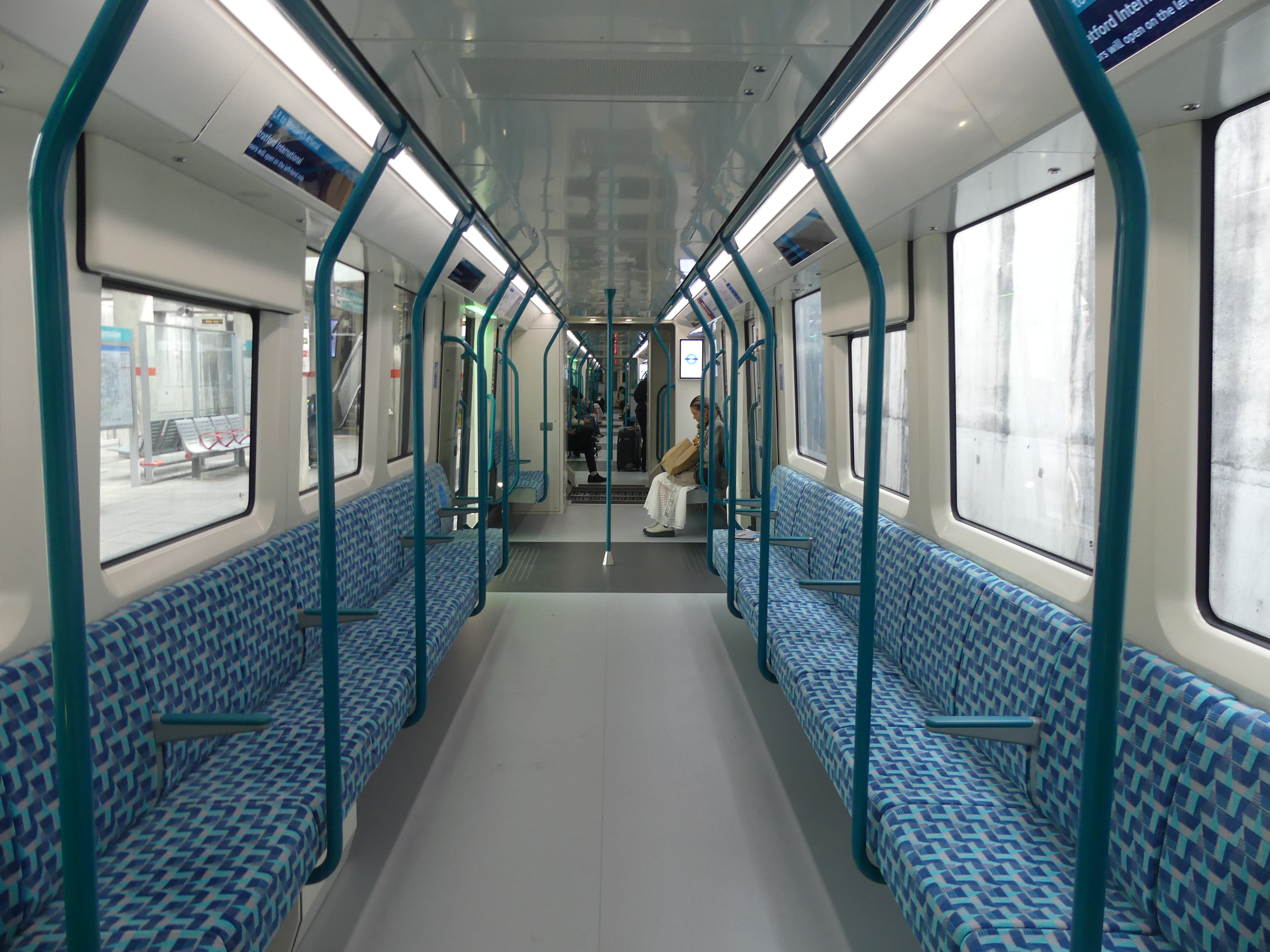
- Interior
- In service: 2025–2025, 2026–present
- Manufacturer: Construcciones y Auxiliar de Ferrocarriles (CAF)
- Built at: Beasain, Spain
- Family name: CAF Inneo
- Replaced: B90/B92/B2K
- Constructed: 2020–2026
- Number built: 54
- Formation: 5 cars per unit
- Fleet numbers: 201-254
- Capacity: 156 seats, 792 capacity
- Depot: Beckton DLR depot
- Line served: Docklands Light Railway

Specifications
- Car body construction: aluminium monocoque
- Train length: 86.7 m (284 ft 5 3/8 in)
- Width: 2.65 m (8 ft 8 3/8 in)
- Doors: 12 doors (two per side on Cars A, C & E, and three per side on Cars B & D)
- Maximum speed: 80 km/h (50 mph) (Maximum speed capable); 64 km/h (40 mph) (Regular operational speed)
- Weight: 117 t (115 long tons)
- Electric systems: 750 V DC third rail
- Current collection: Contact shoe bottom contact
- Minimum turning radius: 125 ft (38 m)
- Track gauge: 4 ft 8 1/2 in (1,435 mm) standard gauge

The Docklands Light Railway B23 Stock is the fourth generation of train used on the Docklands Light Railway (DLR), a light metro system that serves the London Docklands area in the east of London.

In 2019, Transport for London (TfL) announced that they had ordered 43 trains from Construcciones y Auxiliar de Ferrocarriles (CAF) to replace the existing B90/B92/B2K stock and provide additional capacity on the network. An additional 11 trains were ordered in 2023. After delays in testing, the B23 Stock entered service in 2025, but was removed from service two months later due to braking issues. The B23 fleet returned to service in September 2026.

Unlike the older fleet (which operates two or three trains coupled together), the B23 Stock has fixed formation units with 5 walk-through coaches equivalent to the length of the existing three-car trains – increasing capacity by 10%. The B23 Stock features real-time digital information screens, air conditioning and mobile device charging points.

As with all DLR trains, the B23 Stock are highly automated, running segregated from traffic and powered by a bottom-contact third rail. The automation system is a GoA3 driverless system, which requires a Passenger Service Agent (PSA) to manually open and close the doors and, when necessary, manually drive the train. The 'B' in the type codes refers to Beckton DLR depot, where they are primarily maintained.

== History ==
In the 2010s, ridership on the DLR continued to grow – rising from around 70 million passenger journeys a year from 2010 to 120 million by 2017. Given projected growth in population in London and new housing developments across East London, as well as the age and unreliability of the 1990s B90/B92/B2K stock – Transport for London (TfL) began work to purchase new DLR trains in 2015. TfL proposed purchasing fixed-formation walk-through trains, whereby one new train would be the same length as three existing DLR trains.

=== Procurement ===
In 2017, TfL published a notice in the Official Journal of the European Union seeking expressions of interest from manufacturers to build a new fleet of 43 trains each 87 metres (285 ft 5 in) long. Procurement took place through a manufacture and supply agreement, with the DLR franchise responsible for maintenance and a separate fleet support agreement having the manufacturer offer technical support and supply spares. The trains were financed by a lease, whereby each train would be paid for by the lessor and purchased by TfL at a later date when it can make funds available. Alstom, Bombardier, Construcciones y Auxiliar de Ferrocarriles (CAF) and a Siemens / Stadler Rail consortium were shortlisted.

On 12 June 2019, CAF was awarded the contract to construct 43 units. An option for an 11 additional units was placed in June 2023, bringing the total ordered to 54 units. Thirty-three will replace the existing trains, and the rest will be used to provide additional capacity. The estimated cost of the contract is £942 million, with the Department for Levelling Up, Housing and Communities providing £280 million as part of the Housing Infrastructure Fund. London City Airport also provided £5 million towards the new trains.

=== Construction ===
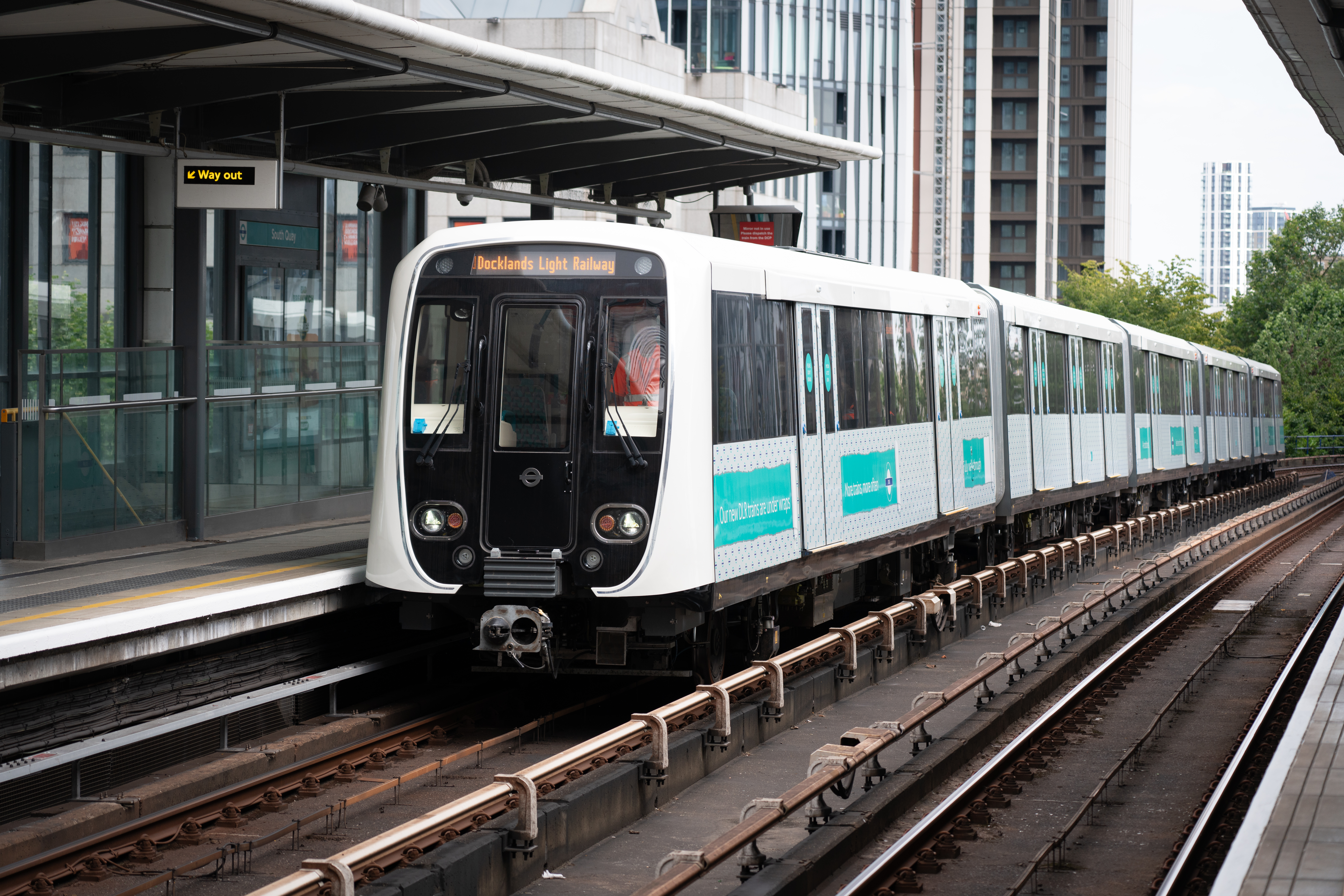
B23 Stock being tested in July 2023

Production of the trains began in December 2020, and the first train arrived at the Beckton depot in January 2023. In February 2023, the name of the trains was revealed to be B23 Stock.

Live testing commenced in March 2023, with trains running during normal operating hours but without passengers. In June 2024, TfL announced that the introduction of the new trains was delayed, after experiencing "challenges" during testing. In February 2025, the majority of the new trains were being stored in Spain – as there was no available space to accommodate them at the Beckton depot, after expansion works were delayed when the Buckingham Group collapsed into administration in 2023. In March 2025, testing of trains resumed, with TfL noting that 40 of the new trains had been completed. In August 2025, new trains began daytime testing, with a planned entry into service later in 2025. By March 2026, all 54 trains had been built.

=== Introduction into service and temporary withdrawal ===
On 30 September 2025, the first B23 Stock entered service between Stratford International and Woolwich Arsenal. In November 2025, the B23 fleet was temporarily withdrawn due to Low Railhead Adhesion, when a B23 unit overshot a platform at Canning Town station in wet weather. In September 2026, the trains returned to service.

== Features ==
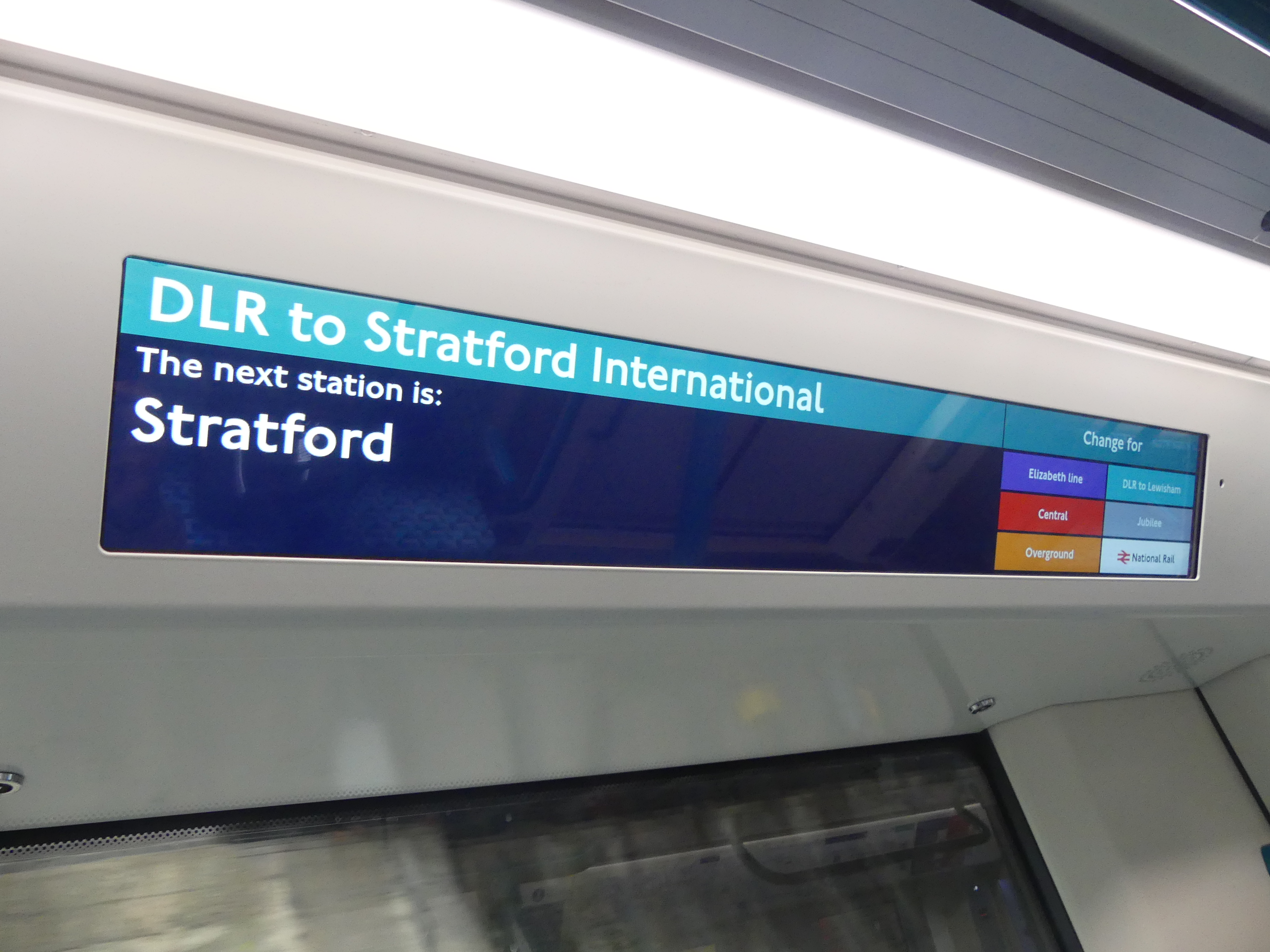
Real-time digital information screens, showing the next station

Unlike the older fleet (which operate two or three trains coupled together), the B23 has fixed formation units with 5 walk-through coaches equivalent to the length of three-car trains – increasing capacity by 10%. On-board facilities include real-time digital information screens, air conditioning and mobile device charging points. TfL is also seeking improved reliability, and is aiming for a mean distance of 50,000 km (31,000 mi) between service-disrupting failures. The B23 also features a new turquoise green and white livery, matching in colour to the DLR roundel and other branding.

The depot at Beckton was expanded to accommodate the new fleet, and the depot at Poplar is to be modified to allow potential development of its air rights.
