= B7 =

B7, B.VII, B07 or B-7 may refer to:

== Vehicles and transportation ==
- Alpina B7, a luxury sedan
- B7 (New York City bus), serving Brooklyn
- Bundesstraße 7, a German Bundesstraße (Federal Highway)
- Bavarian B VII, an 1868 German experimental locomotive
- DLR B07 stock, a passenger train on the Docklands Light Railway in London, UK
- NSB B7 (Class 7), Norwegian railway carriages
- HMS B7, a B-class submarine of the Royal Navy
- Blackburn B-7, a British aircraft
- Lohner B.VII, an aircraft
- Douglas Y1B-7, a bomber of the United States Army Air Corps
- UNI Airways (Taiwan) IATA airline designator
- Boeing 777
- Bensen B-7, a 1955 United States small rotor kite
- LNER Class B7, a class of British steam locomotives
- Docklands Light Railway B07 Stock, a light metro train in London

== Science ==
- B7 (protein), a protein in the immune system
- HLA-B7, an HLA-B serotype
- Vitamin B_{7}, another name for biotin
- A subclass of B-class stars
- Boron-7 (B-7 or ^{7}B), an isotope of boron

== Maths and computing ==
- B7 the hexadecimal number equivalent to AD 183
- 00B7 the Unicode for interpunct ( · )
- B7 ISO/IEC 8859-1 code and 00B7 Unicode for interpunct ( · )

== Other ==
- B7, a diesel fuel containing 7% biodiesel
- Minor seventh (♭7), a musical interval
- B7, the second highest note on a piano, nearly two octaves above Soprano C
- B7, an international standard paper size (88×125 mm), defined in ISO 216
- B7 Baltic Islands Network, a cooperation between governments of seven islands in the Baltic Sea
- Blake's 7, a BBC science fiction television series first broadcast 1978–1981
- B7 (album), 2020 album by Brandy Norwood
- IRT Broadway–Seventh Avenue Line

== See also ==
- 7B (disambiguation)
