= B92 (disambiguation) =

B92 is a broadcaster with national coverage headquartered in Belgrade, Serbia

B92 may also refer to:

- B92, a postcode district in the B postcode area, United Kingdom
- Bundesstraße 92, a German road
- Görtschitztal Straße, an Austrian road
- Sicilian Defence, Najdorf Variation, according to the list of chess openings
- DLR B92 stock, a passenger train on the Docklands Light Railway in London, UK
