= B2K (disambiguation) =

B2K was an American boy band.

B2K or b2k may also refer to:

- DLR B2K stock, type of train
- "Years before year 2000 CE", a dating system, see Before Present

== See also ==
- Lola B2K/00, Lola B2K/10, Lola B2K/40 of Lola Cars
