= Docklands Light Railway P86 and P89 stock =

Light metro train

P86 and P89 stock
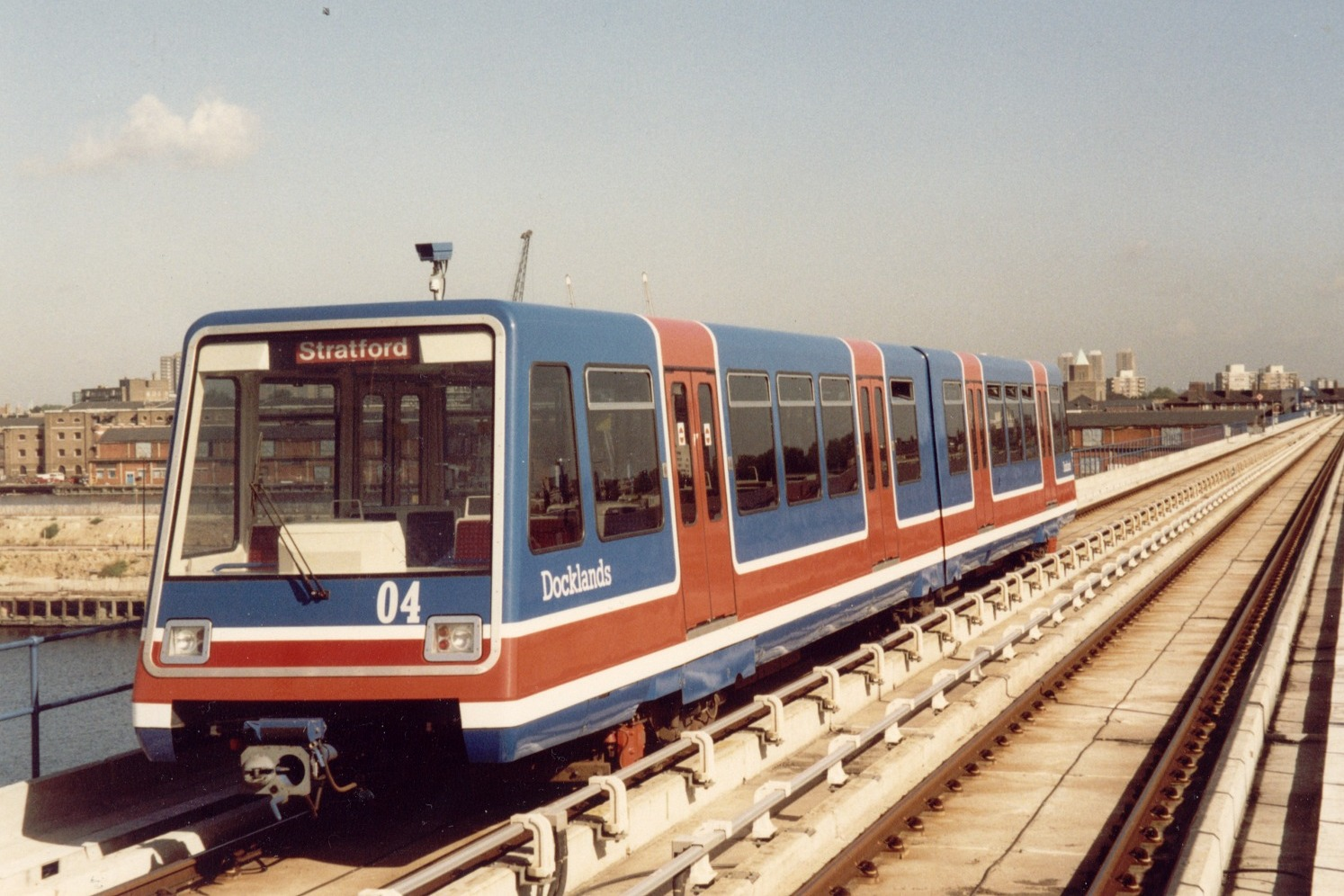
- P86 at West India Docks in 1987
- In service: Docklands Light Railway: P86: 1987–1995; P89: 1989–1995; Essen Stadtbahn: P86: 1991–present; P89: 1996–present
- Manufacturers: Linke-Hofmann-Busch (P86); British Rail Engineering Limited (P89)
- Built at: P86: Salzgitter, Germany; P89: Holgate Road carriage works, York, England
- Refurbished: P86: 2005–2012; P89: 1996
- Number built: P86: 11; P89: 10
- Successor: DLR: B90 and B92; Essen Stadtbahn: Ruhrbahn HF1
- Fleet numbers: P86: 01–11; P89: 12–21
- Capacity: P86: 84 seats, 130 standing
- Depot: Poplar DLR depot
- Lines served: Docklands Light Railway (1987–1995); Essen Stadtbahn (1994–)

Specifications
- Car body construction: steel
- Train length: 28 m (91 ft 10 3/8 in)
- Width: 2.65 m (8 ft 8 3/8 in)
- Height: 3.4 m (11 ft 1 7/8 in)
- Doors: 4 double inward gliding doors
- Articulated sections: 2
- Wheelbase: 10 metres (33 ft) bogie centres
- Maximum speed: 80 kilometres per hour (50 mph)
- Weight: 39 t (38 long tons)
- Electric systems: 750 V DC third rail
- Current collection: Contact shoe bottom contact
- Minimum turning radius: 40 metres (130 ft)
- Coupling system: Scharfenberg
- Track gauge: 4 ft 8 1/2 in (1,435 mm) standard gauge

The Docklands Light Railway P86 and P89 stock were the first generation of trains used on the Docklands Light Railway (DLR), a light metro system which serves the London Docklands area in the east of London.

In the mid 1980s, 11 trains were ordered from West German company Linke-Hofmann-Busch by the GEC and Mowlem consortium building the system. These P86 trains entered service with the opening of the DLR in 1987. 10 additional trains were ordered from British Rail Engineering Limited (BREL) in the late 1980s, as the P86 lacked the fire safety standards required for underground operation, and could not be coupled in pairs. However, further issues with the signalling system, coupling of units and low capacity meant that they were replaced by B90 and B92 trains by 1995. As with all DLR trains, both the P86 and P89 trains were highly automated, running segregated from traffic powered by a bottom-contact third rail.

In the early 1990s, all P86 and P89 units were sold to Essener Verkehrs-AG (EVAG) in Essen, Germany for use on the Essen Stadtbahn. The P86 trains entered service in Essen from 1991, and were refurbished from the mid 2000s. The P89 trains were refurbished prior to entering service from 1996 onwards. In 2021, Ruhrbahn announced that 44 vehicles had been ordered from Construcciones y Auxiliar de Ferrocarriles to replace the Docklands vehicles by 2026.

== History ==
During development of the Docklands Light Railway (DLR) in the early 1980s, various vehicle options were considered included trams, minitram (small, completely automated tram-like vehicles of about 25 passengers), guided buses and automated guideway transit. In October 1982, a rail solution was confirmed, under the proviso that the system would cost no more that £77 million, and be procured using a turnkey contract. An international competition took place, led by London Transport and the London Docklands Development Corporation (LDDC). Two bidders were being considered: Urban Transportation Development Corporation (UTDC) – a crown corporation owned by the Government of Ontario, Canada that proposed the use of its Intermediate Capacity Transit System, and a consortium of GEC and Mowlem.

In 1984, GEC-Mowlem were chosen by Government, as they proposed building the system within the £77 million budget. UTDC's price had been over £100 million. Mowlem would design and build the civil engineering (tracks, structures, stations etc) and GEC would design and build the trains, signalling and power.

=== P86 ===
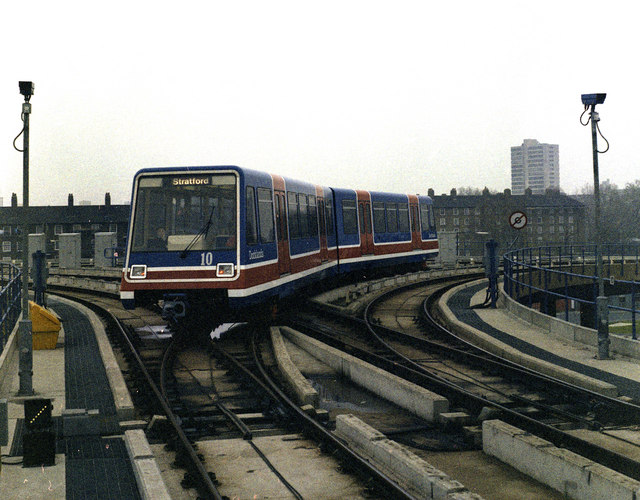
P86 stock car 10 passing over the flat junction at Poplar heading for Stratford, 1987

Due to the low order number, GEC subcontracted the design and construction of the car bodies to West German company Linke-Hofmann-Busch, with GEC providing control and traction equipment. The car bodies were derived from a German Stadtbahnwagen B design, which was intended for use in light rail systems with sections of street running lines. The signalling used fixed-block technology developed by GEC and General Railway Signal, combined with automatic train operation. A blue, red and white livery was applied to the vehicles, with a Docklands logotype in the Rockwell typeface. Two other liveries were considered – yellow and grey with a red motif, or a triple blue with orange accents.

The first vehicles arrived in the UK from West Germany in August 1986, with the last delivered in February 1987. These were referred to as P86 stock, the 'P' referring to Poplar depot, where they were maintained.

Prior to its introduction into service, No.11 was part of a light rail demonstration at Debdale Park, Manchester for which it had a pantograph fitted by Balfour Beatty. The demonstration took place on 9 February 1987 as evaluation trials for a potential tram system in Manchester. No.11 subsequently carried Queen Elizabeth II and the Prince Philip, Duke of Edinburgh during the opening of the DLR on 30 July 1987 from Island Gardens to Poplar and then to Tower Gateway. It also operated the first revenue-earning DLR service and was the first to move to Essen in 1991.

Trains had 84 seats in each car, arranged in transverse bays of four to take advantage of the large windows. There were two bays for wheelchair users, and twelve longitudinal seats to provide a larger circulation area. An emergency operator's console for the Train Captain was provided, which was locked when not in use. The cars had folding doors, suitable for the amount of passengers forecast to use the DLR. The cars also have level access with a platform gap of 75 mm (3.0 in).

=== P89 ===
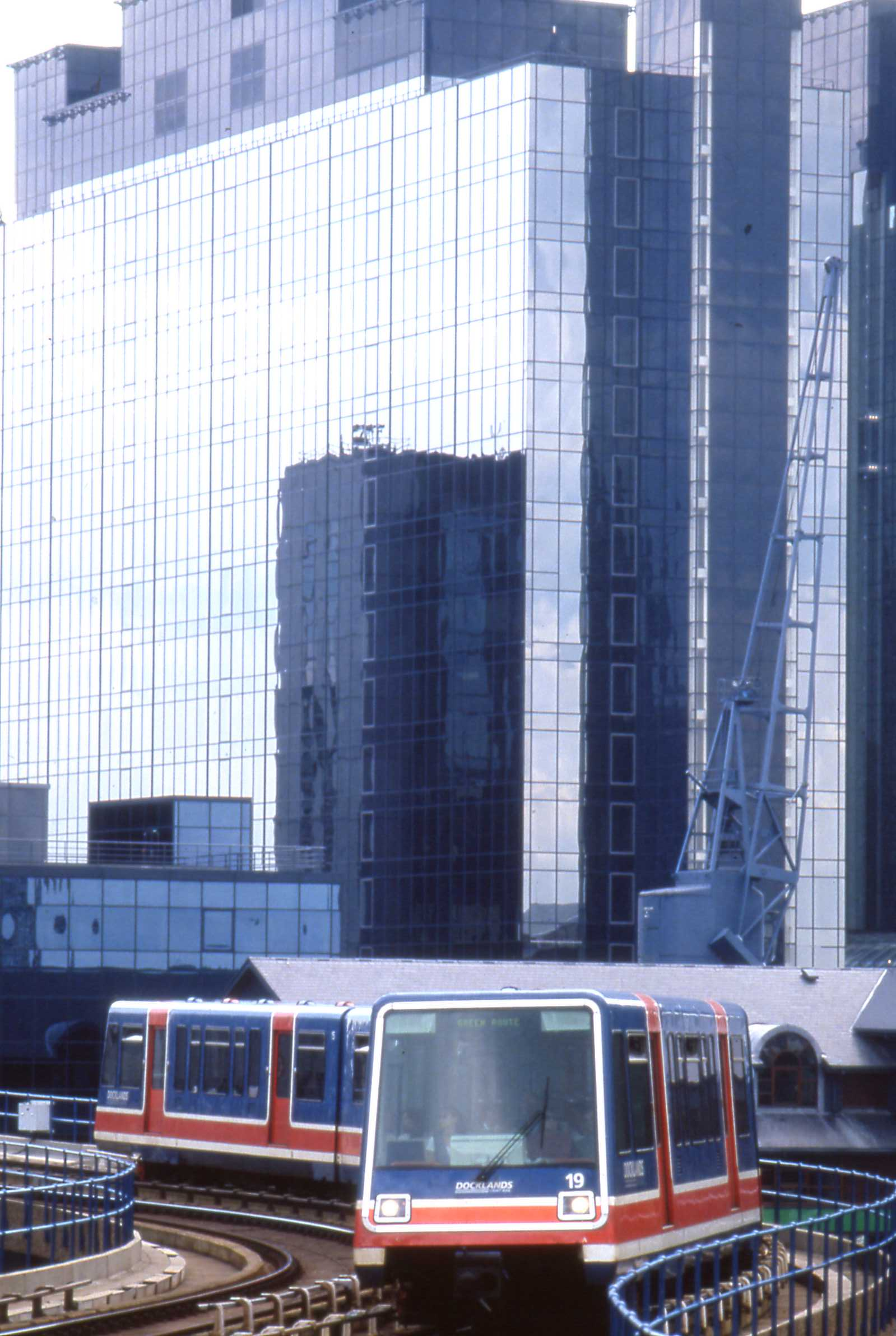
P89 stock in 1994

In 1987, property developer Olympia and York began to develop the Canary Wharf business and financial district in Docklands, with the DLR to be extended in tunnel to Bank station in the City of London. However, the P86 cars had not been built to fire safety standards required for underground operation, and could not be coupled in pairs. In July 1987, London Transport therefore ordered 10 additional trains to service the extension to Bank.

GEC-Mowlem subcontracted the construction of the trains to British Rail Engineering Limited (BREL). 10 cars (numbered 12 to 21) were built at BREL's Holgate Road carriage works between 1989 and 1990, with the first vehicle was delivered in December 1989 and the last by May 1990. The first P89 entered service in May 1990. These were broadly similar to the original P86 stock but had a level of fireproofing which permitted operation through the twin tunnels to Bank. Apart from the car numbers, one difference was the red colour underneath the end window was noticeably more orange and reflective on the P89 cars than on the original P86 ones.

It was envisaged that the P89 trains would serve services to Bank, allowing the P86 to serve the Stratford to Island Gardens service. However, the large number of passengers using the DLR and proposed extensions to Beckton meant that more trains would be required. By 1994, all P89s had been modified with single-leaf sliding pocket doors to improve capacity.

=== Replacement ===
Following the opening of the DLR, several issues with the trains and signalling system emerged. The foldable doors were liable to jam when blocked by passengers on crowded trains, and the P89s had been modified with single-leaf sliding pocket doors. Both the P86 and the P89 trains lacked evacuation doors at the front and rear of the train. P86 cars did not comply with safety and fire regulations and therefore could not be used in underground tunnels. There were also continued issues with the original signalling system.

Following these issues, the DLR decided in the late 1980s to replace the P86 and P89 stock with new trains and resignal the entire railway using Alcatel SelTrac. Additional trains were already required to service the Beckton extension of the DLR, then under construction. London Transport procured a complete fleet of replacement trains (B90 and B92 stock), with the contract won by Belgian manufacturer La Brugeoise et Nivelles. Signalling and the replacement fleet of trains cost around £200 million.

In 1991, all P86 stock trains were sold to Essener Verkehrs-AG (EVAG) in Essen, Germany for use on the Essen Stadtbahn. The first train left London for Essen in November 1991. By the mid 1990s, it was considered that converting the P89 trains to use the Alcatel SelTrac signalling would be too expensive, and the 10 P89 stock trains were also sold to EVAG. The P86 and P89 stock trains were withdrawn in July 1995 on the last day of the GEC-General Signal signalling system. All trains had left London for Essen by August 1997.

== Essen Stadtbahn ==
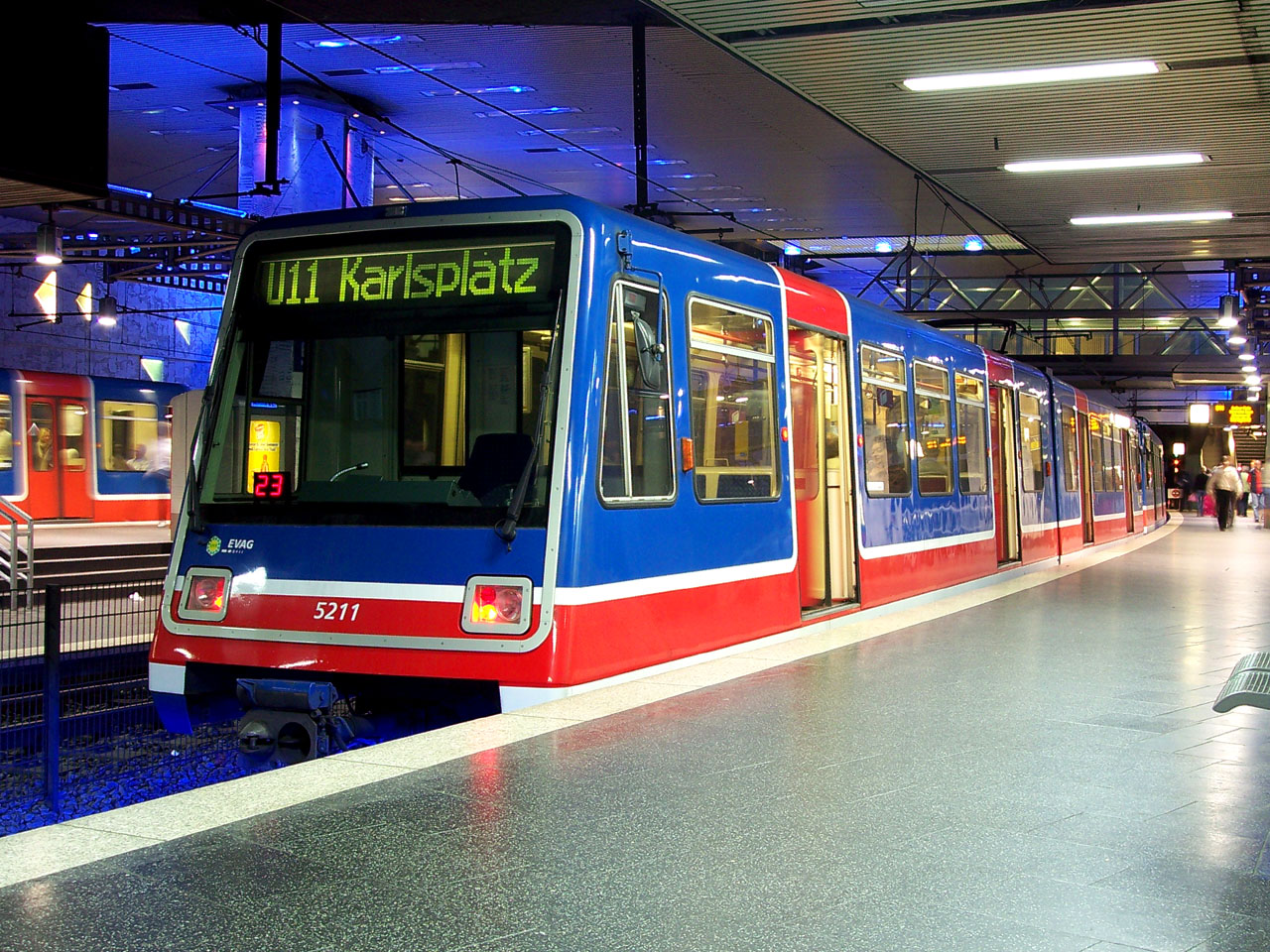
EVAG ex-P86 "Docklands" at Essen Hauptbahnhof in 2005

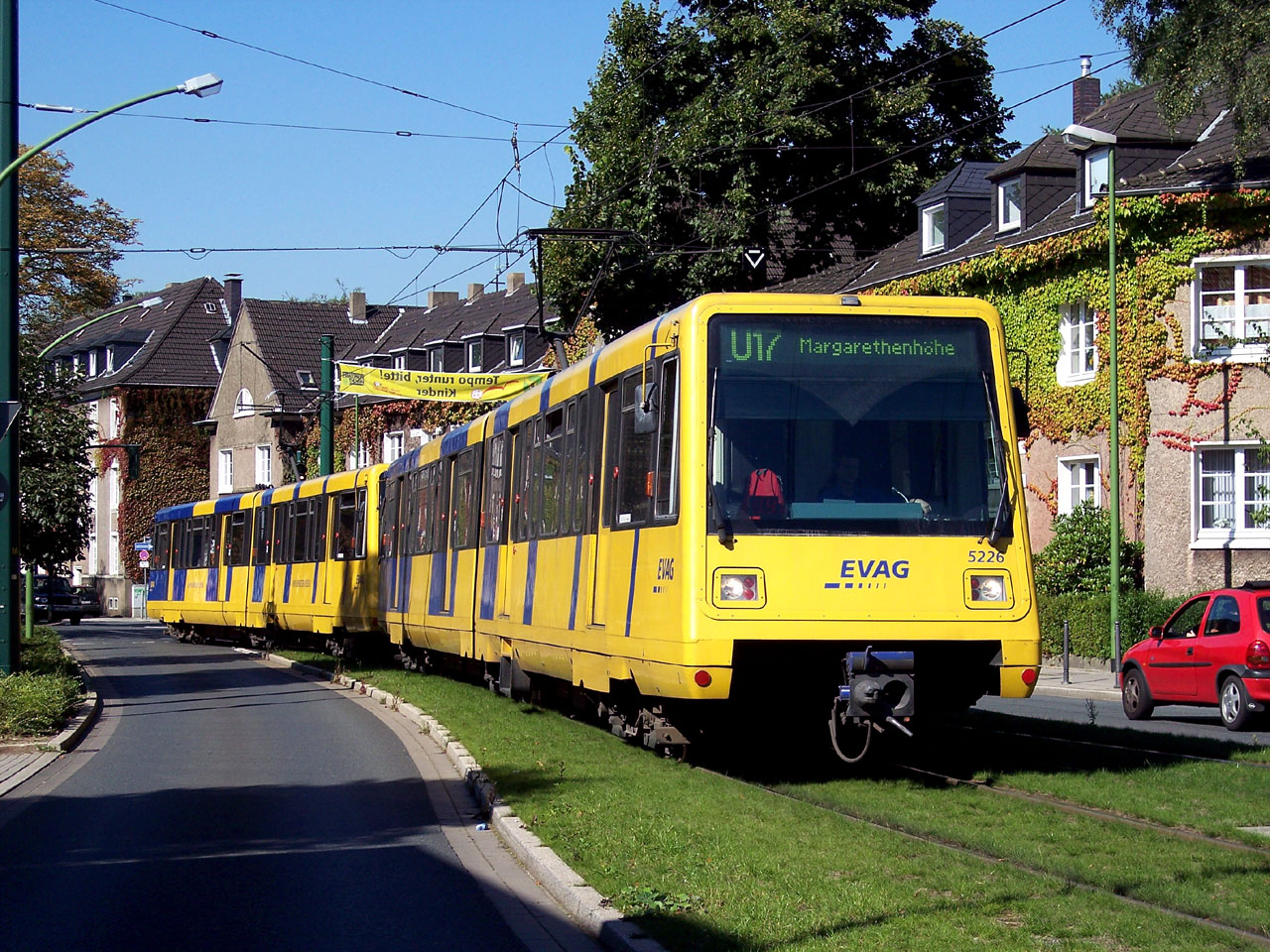
EVAG ex-P89 "Docklands" at Margarethenhoehe in 2005

In Germany, the acquired DLR vehicles were extensively rebuilt and put into service on the Essen Stadtbahn between 1994 and 1998. The cost of purchase and refurbishment (around 2 million DM) was around half the purchase price of a brand new train.

Among other things, driving cabs and rooftop pantographs were retrofitted, as these cars had been driven automatically in London and used bottom contact third rail while the Essen Stadtbahn uses overhead electrification. The braking system also had to be modified for street running. Originally, they retained blue and red DLR colours and were limited to route U11, but after a further modification programme from 2005 onwards, trains appeared in a yellow livery and are used on all routes.

Initially the P86 sets were otherwise largely unchanged from their use in London, while the P89 sets were given an overhaul with new motors and braking to allow for street running. The P86 sets then were overhauled from 2005 to 2012, which also included the replacement of the dual-leaf inward folding doors being replaced with single-lead pocket doors that the P89s got while operating in London, in order to extend their service on the Essen Stadtbahn network, with the converted sets classified as P86U. In this case, the red and blue paint of the DLR was replaced by the yellow and blue EVAG colour scheme, which was used by the P89 sets since their first day of operation in Essen.

In 2021, Ruhrbahn (the successor organisation to EVAG) announced that 44 vehicles had been ordered from Spanish train manufacturer Construcciones y Auxiliar de Ferrocarriles to replace the Docklands vehicles by 2026. The first of these arrived in 2024.
