= Calkain Companies =

American real estate company

- Company type: Defunct
- Industry: Commercial property
- Founded: 2005; 21 years ago
- Founder: Jonathan Hipp
- Defunct: February 2020; 6 years ago
- Headquarters: Herndon, Virginia, U.S.
- Number of locations: New York City; Fort Lauderdale; Atlanta; Boston; Philadelphia
- Area served: United States
- Key people: Jonathan Hipp, President & CEO; Patrick Nutt, Managing Partner
- Services: Broker

Calkain Companies was a company that provided services, primarily brokerage, to the commercial real estate industry. It was based in Herndon, Virginia, and focused on buildings that were leased to single tenants. In February 2020, the company was dissolved and its employees joined Avison Young.

== History ==
After working in commercial property for over 20 years, Jonathan Hipp founded Calkain Companies in 2005.

In January 2013, the company brokered the sale of 7 stores in Orlando and central Florida leased to Applebee's for $18.5 million.

In June 2014, Calkain brokered the sale of a store leased to CVS Health in Tysons Corner for $27.4 million, or $1,915 per square foot, the highest net lease sales price in the Washington metropolitan area. Calkain held the previous record with a sale of a store leased to Starbucks in Washington, D.C. for $1,672 per square foot.

In December 2018, the company listed a store in Adams Morgan leased to Wawa.

In September 2019, the company brokered the sale of a CVS in Cleveland Park for $15 million, or $1,714 per square foot.

In February 2020, the company was dissolved and the employees joined Avison Young.
