= Docklands Light Railway B07 Stock =

Light metro train

B07 stock
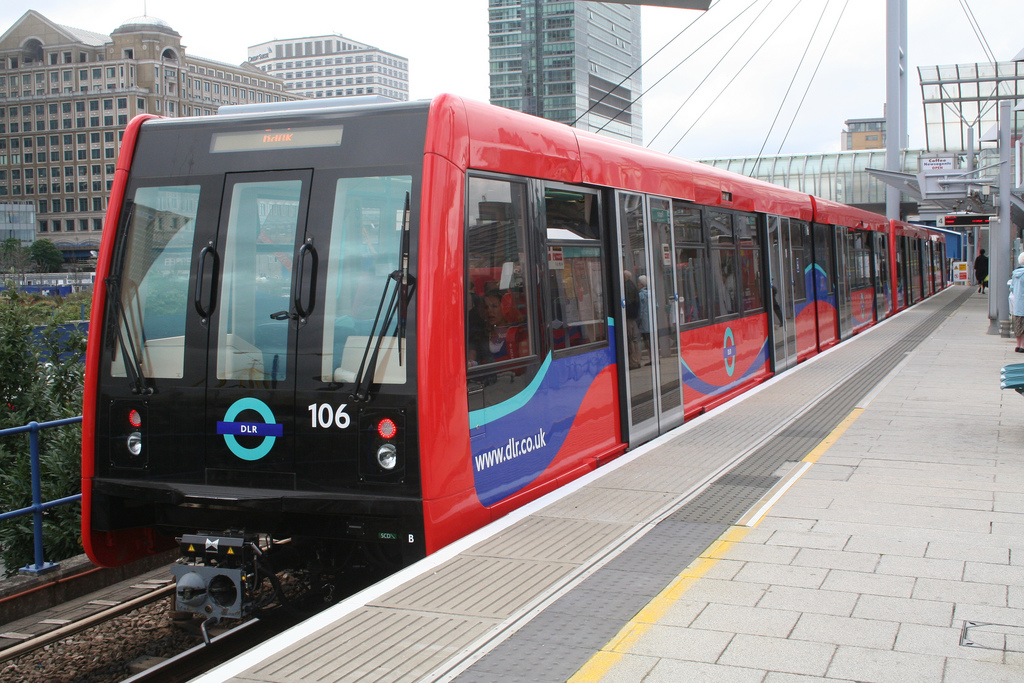
- B07 at Poplar DLR station

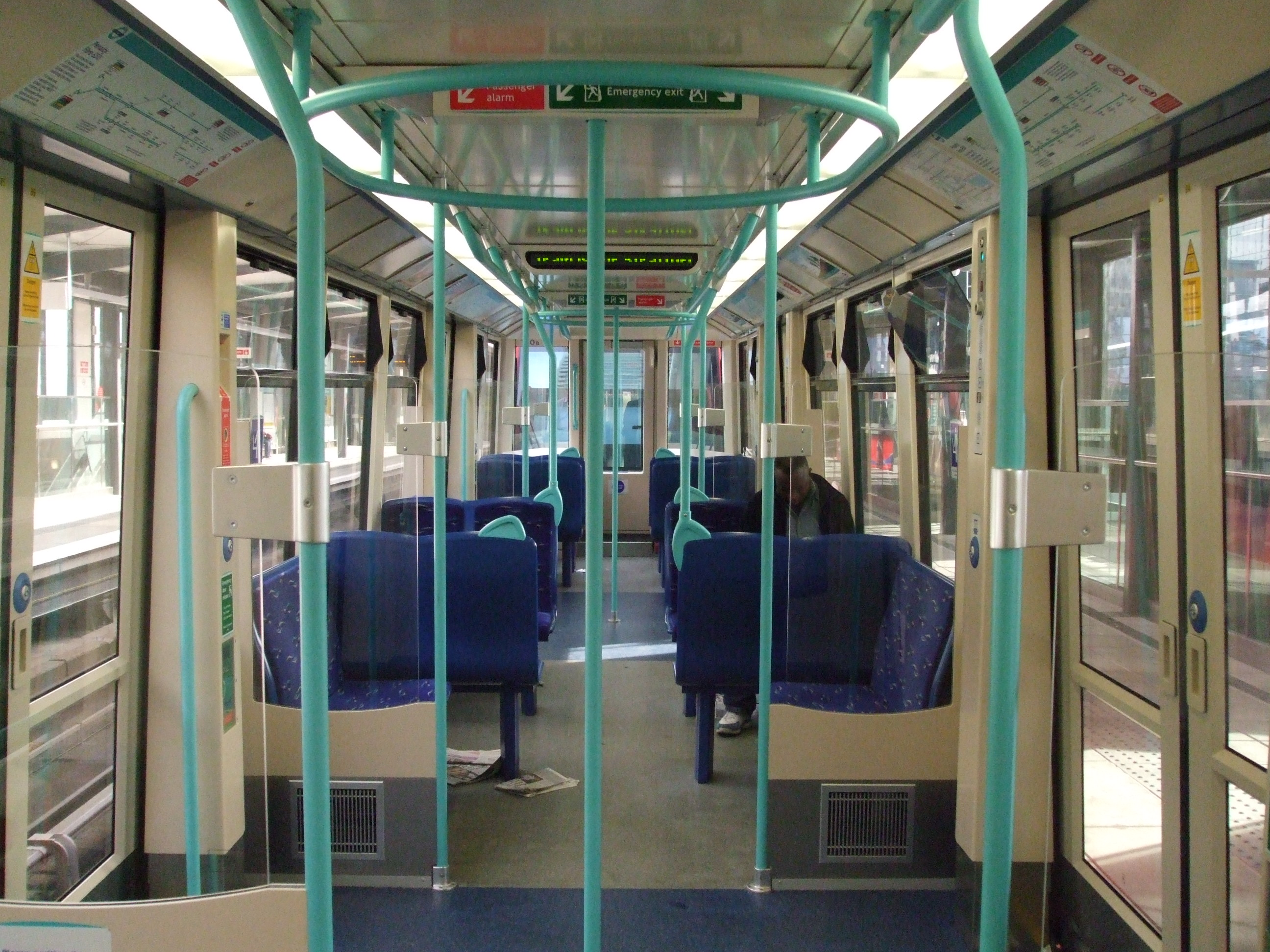
- Interior
- In service: 2008–present
- Manufacturer: Bombardier Transportation
- Built at: Bautzen, Germany
- Number built: 55
- Formation: 2/3 vehicles per train
- Fleet numbers: 101-155
- Capacity: (3-car train) 284 seated, 688 capacity
- Depots: Poplar DLR depot; Beckton DLR depot
- Line served: Docklands Light Railway

Specifications
- Train length: 28 m (91 ft 10 3/8 in)
- Width: 2.65 m (8 ft 8 3/8 in)
- Height: 3.51 m (11 ft 6 1/4 in)
- Doors: 4 pairs of doors each side per car, 1.5 m (4 ft 11 in) wide
- Maximum speed: 80 km/h (50 mph) (Maximum speed capable); 64 km/h (40 mph) (Regular operational speed)
- Weight: 36 t (35 long tons)
- Acceleration: 1.4 metres per second squared (3.1 mph/s)
- Electric systems: 750 V DC third rail
- Current collection: Contact shoe bottom contact
- Minimum turning radius: 38 m (125 ft)
- Track gauge: 4 ft 8 1/2 in (1,435 mm) standard gauge

The Docklands Light Railway B07 stock is the third generation of train used on the Docklands Light Railway (DLR), a light metro system that serves the London Docklands area in the east of London.

In the mid-2000s, capacity on the DLR was increased with the extension of platforms to allow for three-car operation. Additional trains were also required to serve extensions to the network. 24 trains were therefore ordered from Bombardier to a similar, but updated design to the existing B90/B92/B2K stock. Following London's successful bid in July 2005 to host the Olympic and Paralympic Games in 2012, 31 additional trains were ordered, partly funded by the Olympic Delivery Authority. In all, a total of 55 trains were built in two batches between 2007 and 2009 at the Bombardier Transportation factory in Bautzen, Germany at a cost of around £100 million.

As with all DLR trains, the B07 stock are highly automated, running segregated from traffic and powered by a bottom-contact third rail. The automation system is a GoA3 driverless system, which requires a Passenger Service Agent (PSA) to manually open and close the doors and, when necessary, manually drive the train. The 'B' in the type codes refers to Beckton DLR depot, where they are primarily maintained.

== History ==
Between 1995 and 2002, ridership on the DLR grew by 300%, with more than 50 million passenger journeys a year by 2004. In 2005, the network had been extended to London City Airport, and an extension to Woolwich Arsenal was under construction. Further extensions to Stratford International and Dagenham Dock were being considered. Given further anticipated passenger growth and extensions to the DLR network, it was considered that additional trains would be required.

In May 2005, 24 vehicles of a similar but substantially updated design to the existing B90/B92/B2K stock was ordered from Bombardier Transportation at a cost of £50 million. These would allow for three-car service on the Bank–Lewisham route, as well as providing trains to serve network extensions. Although similar in size and shape, the new trains would use more modern technology from the 1990s design of the B90/B92/B2K stock. Initially to be delivered between May 2007 and September 2008, the B07 stock were built at Bombardier's factory in Bautzen, Germany. The first train was delivered from December 2007 and entered service in September 2008. All units had entered service by July 2009.

London's successful bid in July 2005 to host the Olympic and Paralympic Games in 2012 relied on the DLR to serve several key venues in East London. Consequently, 31 additional vehicles were ordered from Bombardier in June 2006 at a cost of £50 million, with £20 million in funding provided by the Olympic Delivery Authority. These trains were built at Bombardier's plant at Bautzen, Germany. The first 6 trains had been delivered by June 2009, with all trains of the second batch in service by the end of June 2010.

=== Three-car trains ===
Work to extend platforms on across the DLR route was completed in 2010 at a cost of £325 million. The B07 units were the first to operate as three-car trains in February 2010; the B92 trains followed operating in this way later in 2010. The initial three-car route was the mainstream Bank to Lewisham route, but the lengthened trains were subsequently also used on other routes.

=== Refurbishment ===
In 2023, TfL noted that they planned to refurbish the B07 stock in the late 2020s.

== Features ==
Compared to the existing B90/B92/B2K stock, B07 stock feature a totally redesigned exterior and interior. They have larger windows and doors and more leg room. In addition, several technical improvements were made for better acceleration, altered door functions to enable faster boarding and alighting, and improved braking for a smoother ride.

Mechanical coupling allows for rescue of B07 stock trains with B90/B92/B2K stock and vice versa – but the vehicles cannot be mixed operationally due the lack of electrical connections.
