= B23 =

B23 may refer to:

- A human nucleolar protein also known as NPM1
- The 2.3L, pre-revision variant of the Volvo Redblock engine
- Bundesstraße 23, federal highway in Germany
- B-23, national highway in Catalonia
- B-23 Dragon, a 1930s bomber aircraft
- B-23 (Michigan county highway)
- B23, the designation of Monaro Highway in Victoria, Australia
- Docklands Light Railway B23 Stock, a light metro train in London
