= 7B =

7B or VII-B may refer to:

- 7B (band), a Russian band
- 7B (Long Island bus)
- Oflag VII-B, a World War II German prisoner of war camp for officers, located 1 km (0.62 mi) from Eichstätt, Bavaria
- SR-7B, a part of the Southern Region for the Order of the Arrow in the Boy Scouts of America
- Sudan Red 7B, a red diazo dye
- Suiche 7B, an Interbank network
- WASP-7b, an extrasolar planet discovered in 2008
- IATA airline designator of Moscow Airlines (formerly Atlant-Soyuz Airlines)
- 7B, the production code for the 1986 Doctor Who serial Mindwarp
- Boron-7 (^{7}B), an isotope of boron

== See also ==
- List of highways numbered 7B
- B7 (disambiguation)
