= List of highways numbered 7B =

The following highways are numbered 7B:

== Canada ==
- British Columbia Highway 7B

== United States ==
- New York State Route 7B
  - County Route 7B (Allegany County, New York)
- Oklahoma State Highway 7B
- Vermont Route 7B
- Secondary State Highway 7B (Washington)

== See also ==
- List of highways numbered 7
- 7B (disambiguation)
