= Docklands Light Railway B90, B92, and B2K Stock =

Light metro train

B90, B92 and B2K stock
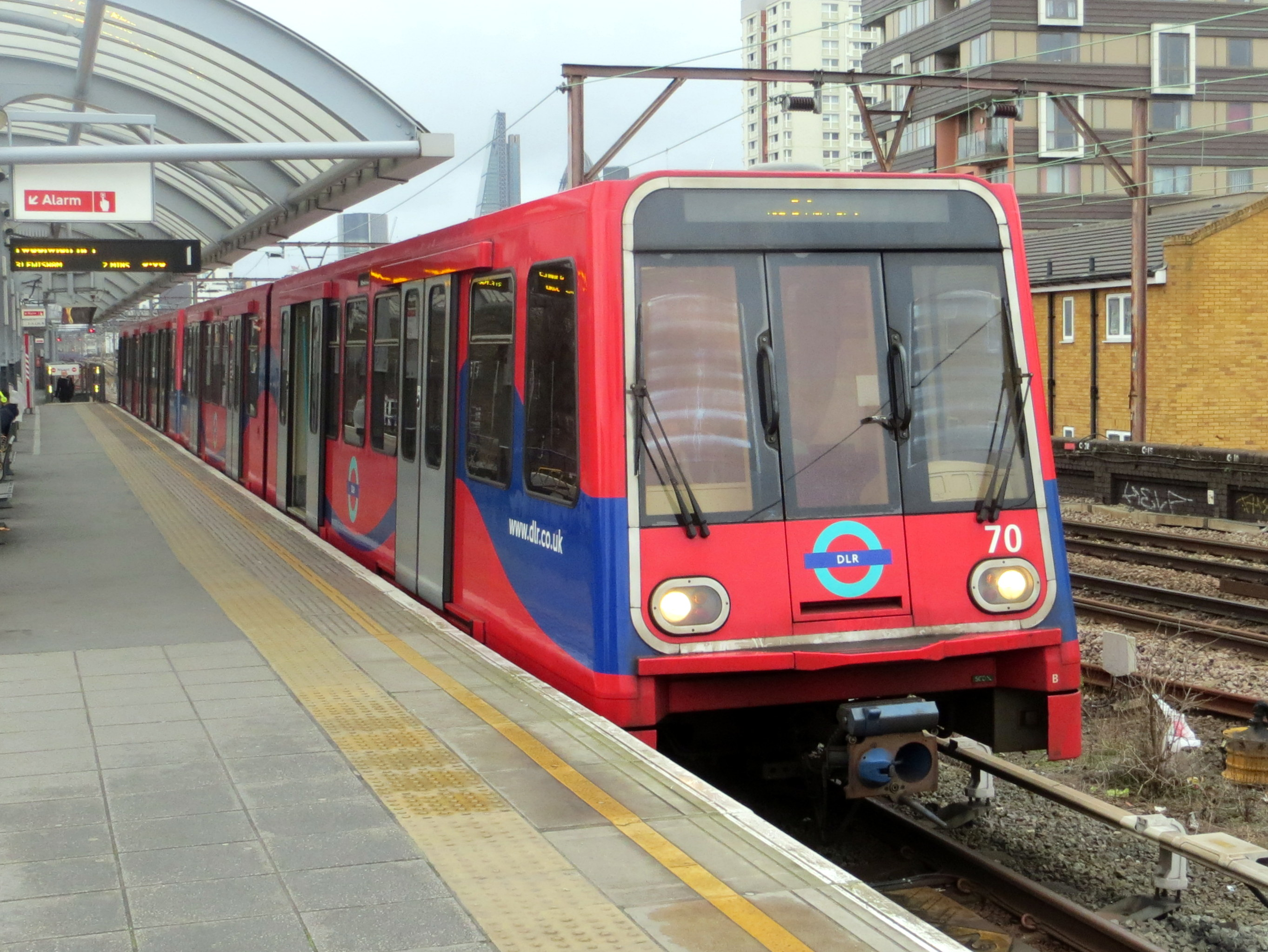
- B92 stock at Shadwell in 2014

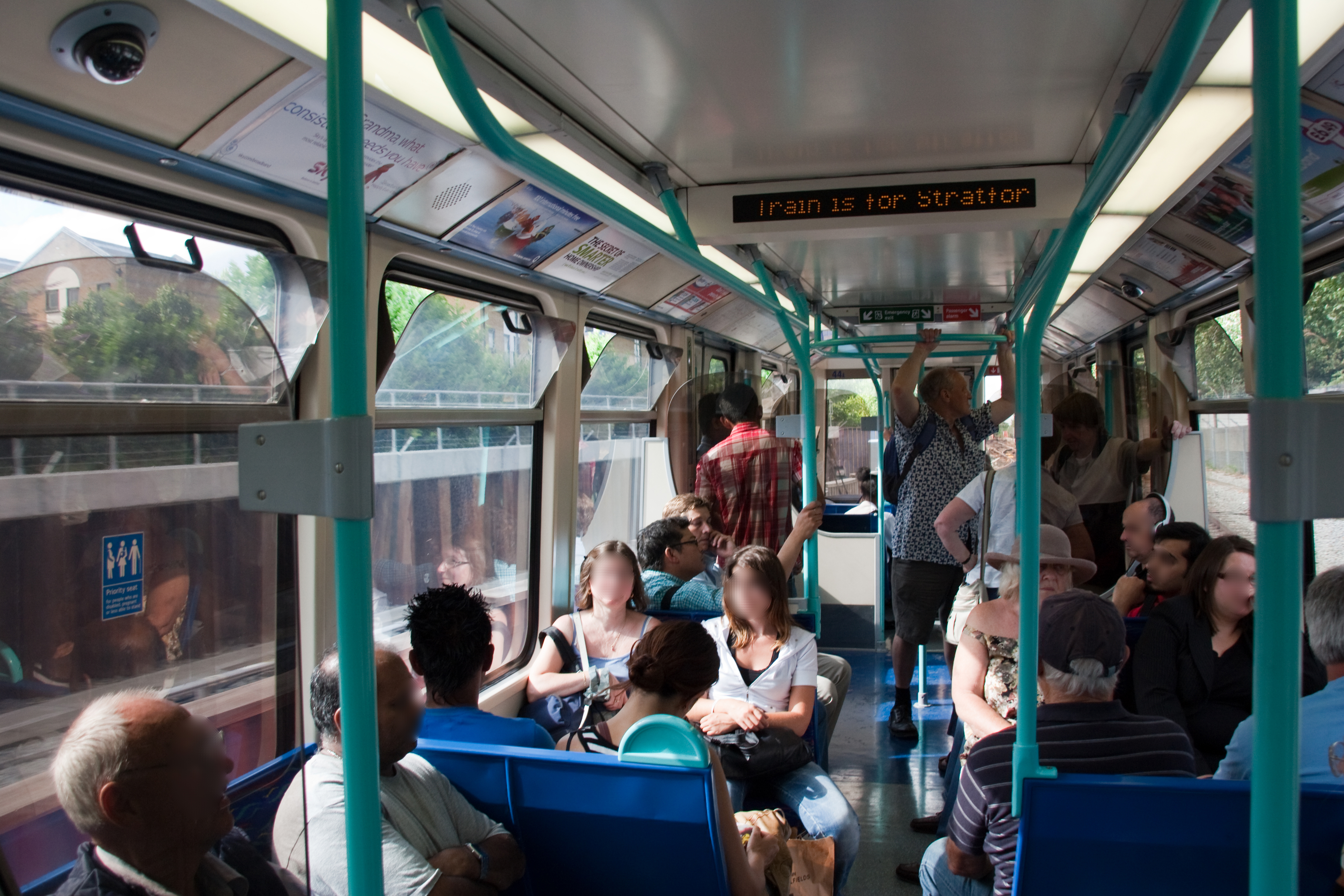
- Interior
- In service: B90: 1991–present; B92: 1993–present; B2K: 2001–present
- Manufacturer: Bombardier Transportation
- Built at: Bruges, Belgium
- Replaced: P86; P89
- Number built: B90: 23; B92: 47; B2K: 24
- Number scrapped: 4 trains
- Successor: B23
- Formation: 2/3 vehicles per train
- Fleet numbers: B90: 22-44; B92: 45-91; B2K: 92-99, 01-16
- Capacity: (3-car train) 284 seated, 688 capacity
- Depots: Poplar DLR depot; Beckton DLR depot
- Line served: Docklands Light Railway

Specifications
- Train length: 28 m (91 ft 10 3/8 in)
- Width: 2.65 m (8 ft 8 3/8 in)
- Height: 3.51 m (11 ft 6 1/4 in)
- Doors: 4 pairs of doors each side per car, 1.5 m (4 ft 11 in) wide
- Maximum speed: 80 km/h (50 mph) (Maximum speed capable); 64 km/h (40 mph) (Regular operational speed)
- Weight: 36 t (35 long tons)
- Electric systems: 750 V DC third rail
- Current collection: Contact shoe bottom contact
- Minimum turning radius: 38 m (125 ft)
- Track gauge: 4 ft 8 1/2 in (1,435 mm) standard gauge

The Docklands Light Railway B90, B92, and B2K stock are the second generation of trains used on the Docklands Light Railway (DLR), a light metro system which serves the London Docklands area in the east of London.

Owing to various issues with the P86 and P89 trains originally used on the DLR (including non-compliance with fire safety standards required for underground operation, low capacity, inability to be coupled in pairs and issues with the signalling system), London Transport ordered a replacement fleet from La Brugeoise et Nivelles (later Bombardier Transportation) and a new signalling system from Alcatel SelTrac as part of the Beckton extension of the DLR in the early 1990s. A total of 94 trains were built in three batches between 1991 and 2002 at Bombardier's factory in Bruges, Belgium.

As with all DLR trains, the B90, B92, and B2K stock are highly automated, running segregated from traffic powered by a bottom-contact third rail. The automation system is a GoA3 driverless system, which requires a Passenger Service Agent (PSA) to manually open and close the doors and, when necessary, manually drive the train. The B90, B92, and B2K stock trains are cosmetically and technologically identical, and can be operated interchangeably in trains of up to three sets. The 'B' in the type codes refers to the Beckton DLR depot, where they are primarily maintained.

In 2019, Transport for London (TfL) announced that they had ordered 43 trains from Construcciones y Auxiliar de Ferrocarriles (CAF) to replace the B90/B92/B2K vehicles. The B23 stock entered service in 2025, with the DLR timetable altered to maximise the life of the B90/B92/B2K trains before they are withdrawn from service.

== History ==
Following the opening of the DLR, several issues with the P86 and P89 trains and the signalling system emerged. The foldable doors were liable to jam when blocked by passengers on crowded trains. Both the P86 and the P89 trains lacked evacuation doors at the front and rear of the train. P86 cars did not comply with safety and fire regulations and therefore could not be used in underground tunnels. There were also continued issues with the original signalling system.

=== B90/B92 ===
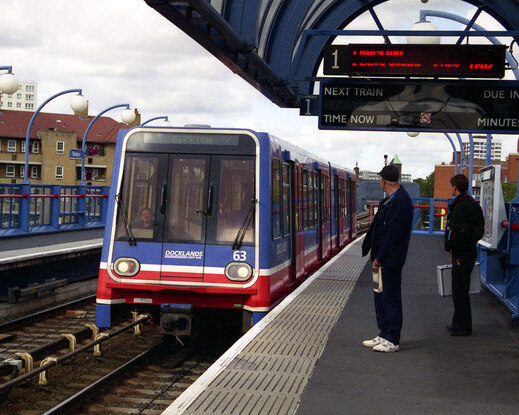
B92 stock train at Westferry in 1994

The large number of passengers using the DLR and proposed extension to Beckton meant that more trains would be required. Belgian manufacturer La Brugeoise et Nivelles (BN) was initially awarded a contract for 10 trains (later known as B90 stock) to serve the Beckton extension.

However, the DLR decided to completely replace the P86 and P89 fleet with new trains and resignal the entire railway using Alcatel SelTrac. By October 1989, the order with BN had increased to 44 trains, later increasing to 70 trains.

With Bombardier Transportation purchasing BN in 1991, the trains were built at their factory in Bruges, Belgium. The first train of B90 stock was delivered in January 1991, with a total of 23 B90 stock trains delivered by September 1991, all equipped with the GEC and General Railway Signal signalling system that used fixed block technology. By November 1991, all but two B90 trains were in service—as testing on the new Alcatel SelTrac moving block signalling system began at Poplar Depot.

From October 1991, the first B92 stock trains were delivered to the new depot at Beckton Depot, allowing testing on the new Alcatel SelTrac moving block signalling system to take place. Cosmetically identical to B90 stock trains, the B92 stock were only fitted with the Alcatel SelTrac signalling system, and could not enter service until this was activated across the system. A total of 47 B92 stock trains were delivered, the last in March 1993.

In 1993, the first B92 stock trains entered service as the Alcatel SelTrac signalling system began to replace the original signalling system. From October 1993, B90 stock trains were withdrawn from service to be modified to work with the new signalling system, re-entering service shortly after.

It was considered that converting the P89 trains to use the Alcatel SelTrac signalling would be too expensive, and the P89 stock trains were withdrawn in July 1995 on the last day of the GEC-General Signal signalling system. These were sold to Essen for use on the Essen Stadtbahn, to work alongside the previously sold P86 trains. By April 1998, all B90 stock trains had been converted and therefore the B90 and B92 stock were cosmetically and technologically identical.

Re-signalling the entire DLR and purchasing the replacement fleet of trains had cost around £200 million. Compared to the P86/P89 stock trains, the B90/B92 stocks featured externally mounted sliding doors, fewer transverse seats (increasing capacity) and an emergency access door at the front and rear allowing access between coupled units. They entered service in a modified blue, red and white livery, with grey doors to provide greater contrast.

=== B2K ===
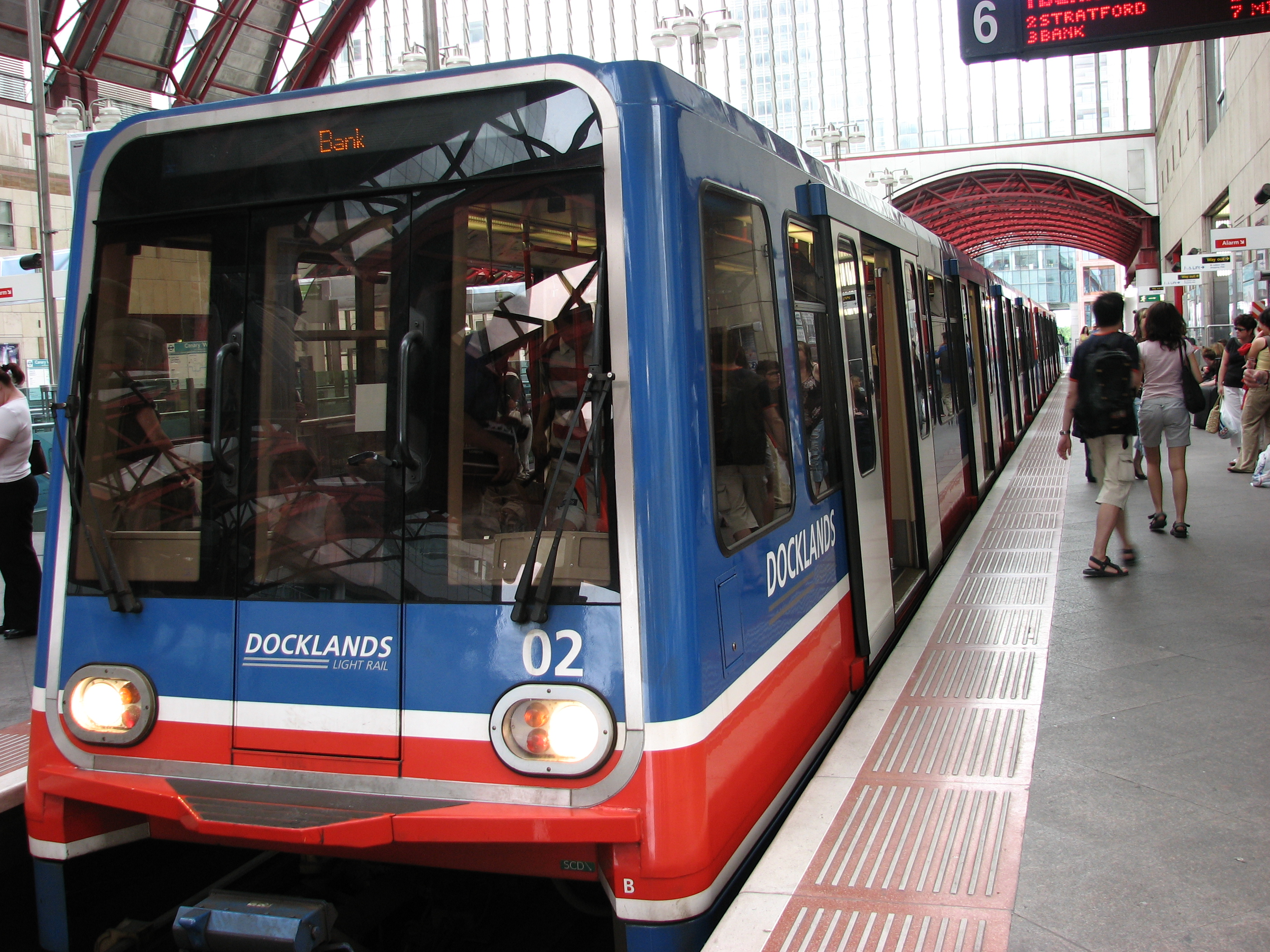
B2K stock in the original blue, red and grey livery at Canary Wharf in 2004

In October 1999, the Department for the Environment, Transport and the Regions gave approval for an additional 12 vehicles to be ordered from Bombardier, to serve the planned extensions to the system.

This order was later extended to 24 vehicles, at a total cost of around £40 million. The first B2K train was delivered from Belgium to London in January 2002, entering service from June 2002 to March 2003. The introduction of the B2K stock allowed for an increase in the number of services at peak times from August 2002. Beckton depot was also expanded to store the additional trains.

These B2K trains were technologically identical to the B90 and B92 stock trains, but featured various cosmetic improvements, including improved passenger information displays, a new seating moquette, and exterior doors and handrails painted in contrasting colours. Some of the cosmetic differences were mandated by the Rail Vehicle Accessibility Regulations of the Disability Discrimination Act, which were not in force when the older cars were built.

The numbering of the last B2K cars restarted from 01, reusing the numbers of the replaced, original P86/89 stock cars. The main reason for this was that the DLR computer-based signalling system was only originally designed to handle 2-digit car numbers, and a system upgrade to allow 3-digit car numbers did not take place until a few years after these cars were introduced, but before the B07 rolling stock was delivered.

=== Refurbishment ===
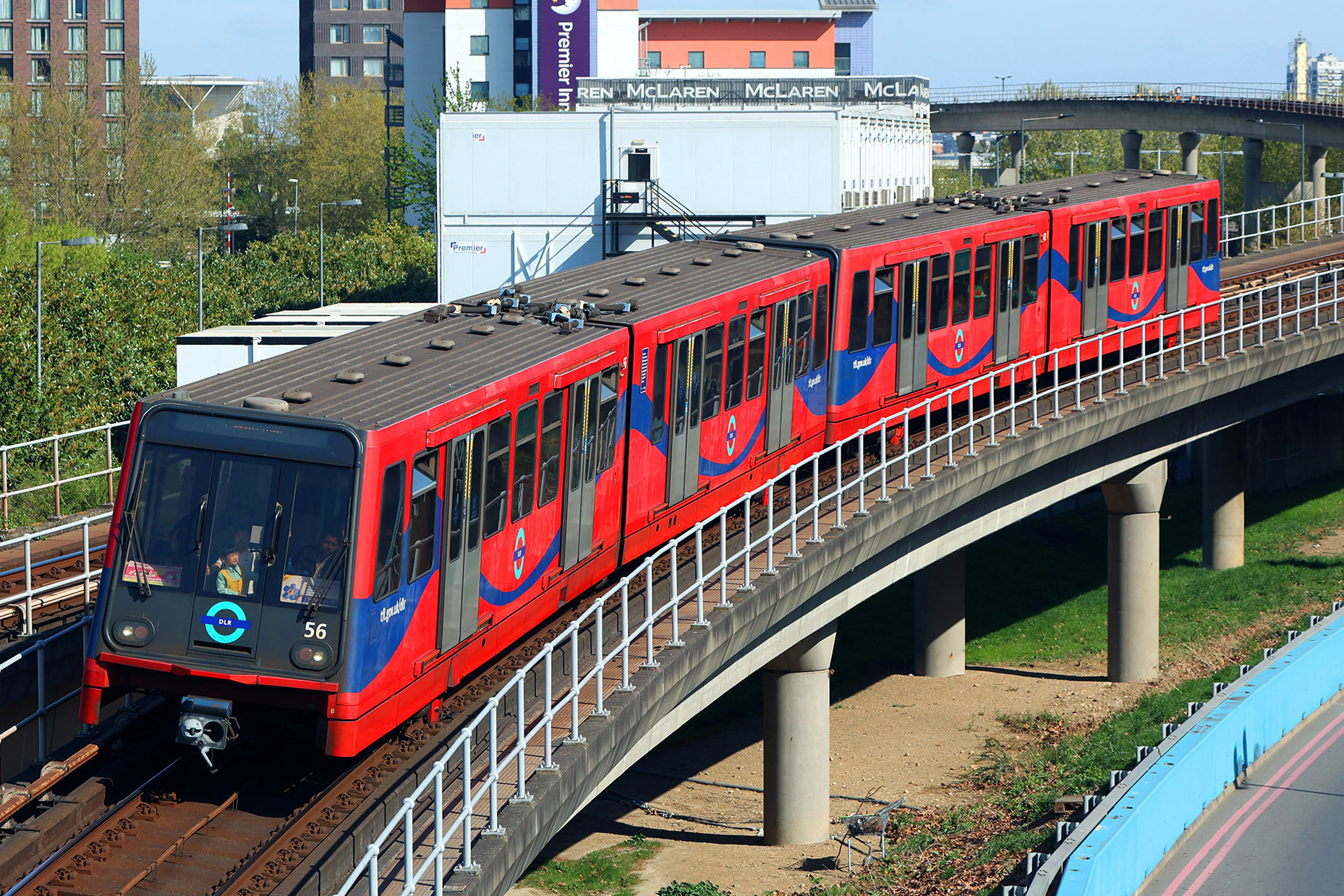
B92 stock in the red and blue "swish" livery following refurbishment

Following the arrival of the B2K trains, the B90/B92 trains were refurbished by Alstom at Wolverton railway works between 2004 and March 2007. This included a new red livery with a blue "swish" and grey doors (to comply with the Disability Discrimination Act 1995) and a redesigned interior. The refurbished units feature an Audio and Visual Information System which gives audio announcements when approaching a station: "This train is for destination, the next stop is next stop", for example: "This train is for Bank, the next stop is Canary Wharf". It also announces the name of the station once the doors have opened, for example, "This is Canary Wharf".

Following works to extend platforms across the system in the late 2000s, the B90/B92/B2K stock can now run in formations of up to three trains in multiple.

=== Replacement ===
Two B90 vehicles numbered 38 and 39 have been scrapped following withdrawal in March 2022 and May 2016 respectively, as well as a single B2K unit, numbered 98, withdrawn from service in July 2019 following accident damage. B92 vehicle 88 was initially withdrawn from service in April 2020 due to an electrical fault, but was reactivated in early 2023 after conversion to a dedicated shunting vehicle being utilised for the unloading and movement of the new build stock within the depot at Beckton. By March 2024, the unit had been scrapped.

In 2019, Transport for London (TfL) announced that they had ordered 43 trains from Construcciones y Auxiliar de Ferrocarriles (CAF) to replace the B90/B92/B2K stock. The B23 stock entered service in 2025, with the DLR timetable altered in June 2025 to maximise the life of the B90/B92/B2K trains before they are withdrawn from service. As each B23 is introduced, it is planned that three B90/B92/B2K trains will be withdrawn.
