= Avison Young =

Property professional services firm

Avison Young (Canada) Inc
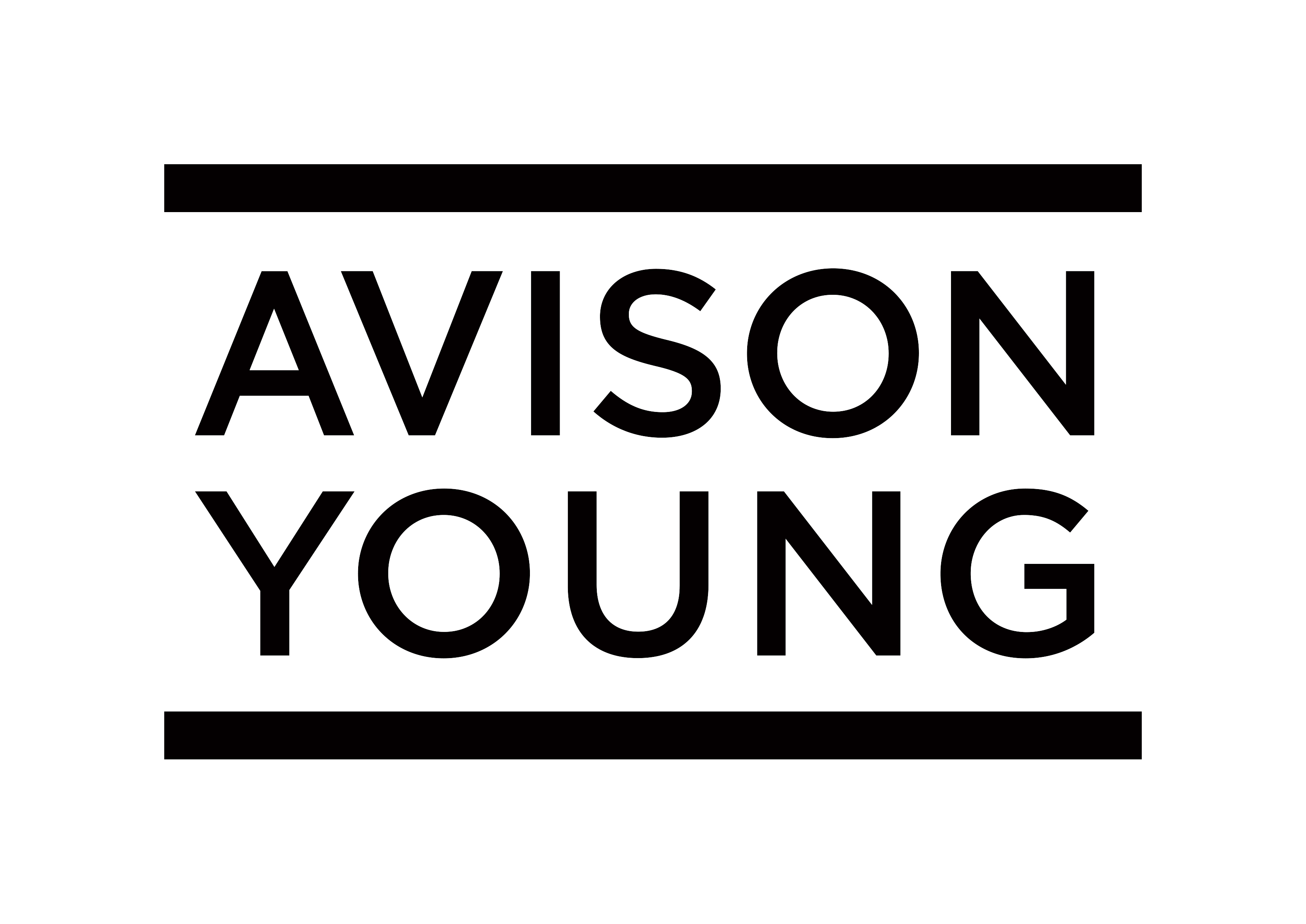
- Type: Commercial Real Estate
- Industry: Real estate
- Founded: 1978
- Headquarters: Toronto, Ontario, Canada
- Number of locations: 100+ office (2020)
- Area served: Worldwide
- Services: Capital markets; Consulting and advisory services; Facility management; Investment and asset management; Investment sales; Investor services; Landlord representation; Lease administration; Mortgage services; Occupier solutions; Private equity; Project management; Property management; Tenant representation; Transaction management; Valuation and advisory services
- Number of employees: 5000+ (2020)
- Website: avisonyoung.com

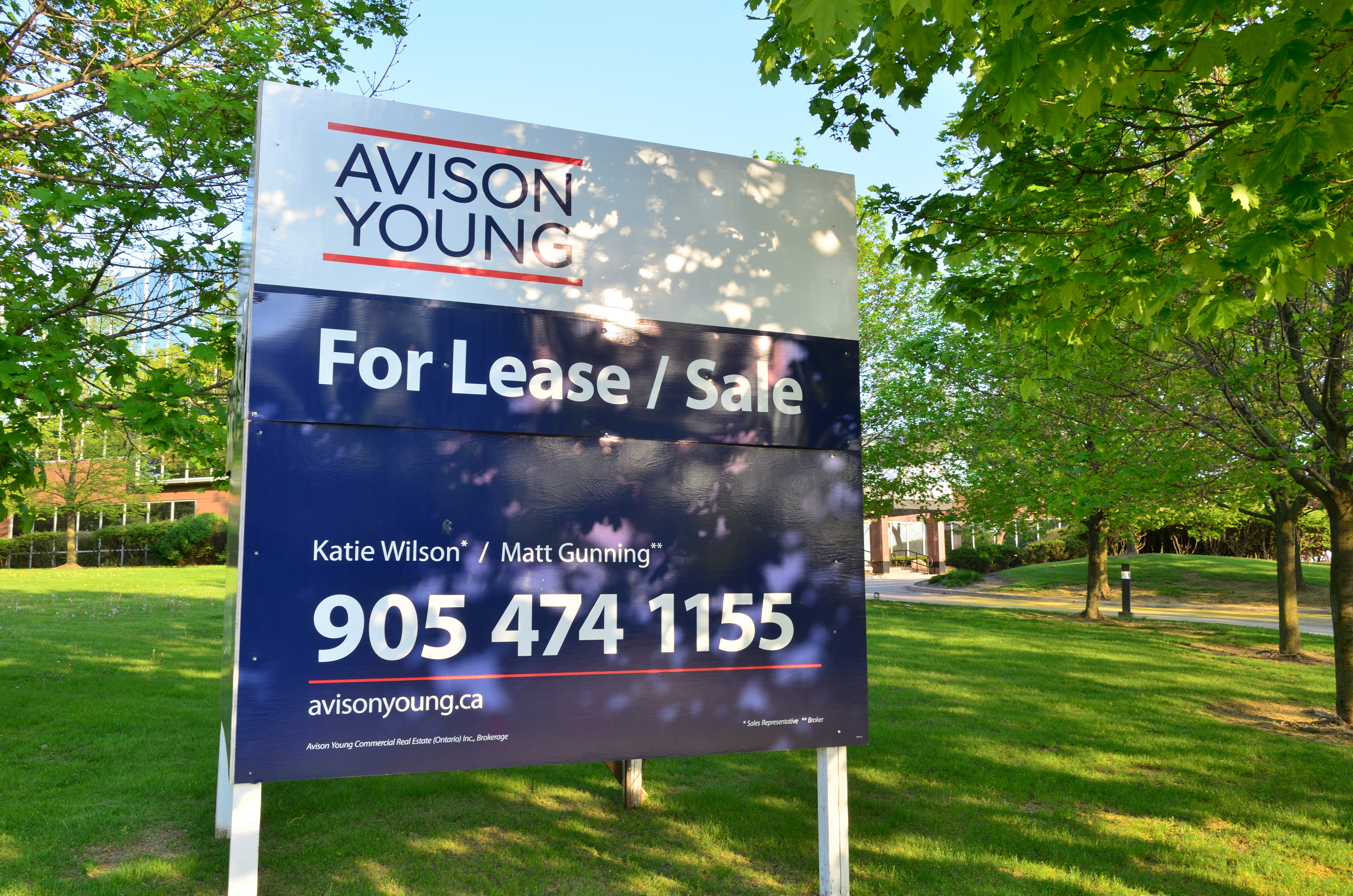
Avison Young for lease / sale sign

Avison Young is a global commercial real estate services firm, headquartered in Toronto, with more than 100 offices in 20 countries. Avison Young was founded in 1978. In February 2019, Avison Young acquired UK-based real estate advisory firm GVA, with the two companies combining under the Avison Young brand. Following the acquisition, the company employed around 5,000 real estate professionals across 120 offices in 20 countries.

In February 2024, Avison Young reached an agreement to restructure its financial obligations. The company said the transaction would reduce its financial obligations by more than half and provide additional capital, while no day-to-day operational or headcount changes were expected.

== Services ==
Avison Young offers commercial real estate services for occupiers and investors, including transaction, management, financial and advisory services.

== History ==
Formed by the union of Graeme Young & Associates of Alberta (1978) and Avison & Associates of Ontario (1989) and British Columbia (1994), Avison Young was created in 1996. Over the next decade, new offices opened in Toronto West (1997), Montreal (2002), Winnipeg and Regina (2004), Halifax (2006) and Ottawa (2007).

The firm's Canadian offices merged into Avison Young (Canada) Inc. in 2008. Since then, Avison Young has grown from 11 Canadian offices and 293 professionals (including 53 principals) to 5,000 employees in more than 100 offices in 19 countries.

In September 2026, Avison Young, overseeing work by UK contractor Buckingham Group, was adjudged to have over-claimed at least £7.69m for earthmoving work at a SEGRO development near Coventry in 2023.
