= List of Intangible Cultural Heritage elements in Northern Europe =

Northern Europe comprises Denmark, Estonia, Finland, Iceland, Ireland, Latvia, Lithuania, Norway, Sweden, and the United Kingdom, and the following dependent territories: the Faroe Islands controlled by Denmark, Åland controlled by Finland, Svalbard and Jan Mayen controlled by Norway, and the British Crown Dependencies, Guernsey and Jersey, and the Isle of Man. The United Kingdom is the most recent to have ratified the Convention for the Safeguarding of the Intangible Cultural Heritage by The United Nations Educational, Scientific and Cultural Organization (UNESCO), doing so on 7 March 2024. The convention was drafted in 2003, and took effect in 2006.

According to the convention, intangible cultural heritage elements are components of the cultural heritage within a territory that are equally as important as physical cultural elements, like World Heritage Sites. The elements are abstract and must be learned, encompassing traditional knowledge which includes festivals, music, performances, celebrations, handicrafts, and oral traditions. Intangible cultural heritage is based on the opinions of local communities, as according to the convention there needs to be stakeholders viewing the elements as "their heritage". The member states undertake to create one or several inventories of the intangible cultural heritage within their territory. This work is ongoing in Northern Europe.

UNESCO upholds two international lists of intangible cultural heritage, the Representative List of the Intangible Cultural Heritage of Humanity and the List of Intangible Cultural Heritage in Need of Urgent Safeguarding. The member states apply for cultural elements to be added to the international lists. The Intergovernmental Committee for the Safeguarding of Intangible Cultural Heritage, which approves new inscription requests, and a definition of "intangible cultural heritage". As part of the convention, the UNESCO also upholds the Register of Good Safeguarding Practices that contains that reflect the principles of the convention – that is to uphold living traditions. No cultural elements from Northern Europe have been included on the List of Intangible Cultural Heritage in Need of Urgent Safeguarding.

== Inventories of intangible cultural heritage in Northern Europe ==
Country/Territory	List(s) of intangible cultural heritage	National authority in charge	Established
Estonia	Estonian Inventory of Intangible Cultural Heritage	Estonian Folk Culture Centre	2007
Denmark	Living culture – an inventory of intangible cultural heritage in Denmark	The Danish Folklore Archives at The Royal Danish Library	2017
Finland	Wiki-inventory for living heritage National inventory for living heritage	National Board of Antiquities	2016 2017
Iceland	-	The Ministry of Education, Science and Culture	?
Ireland	National Inventory of Intangible Cultural Heritage	Department of Culture, Heritage and the Gaeltacht	2016
Latvia	Nemateriālā kultūras mantojuma saraksts	National Culture Center of Latvia	2017
Lithuania	The Inventory of Intangible Cultural Heritage of Lithuania	Lithuanian National Culture Centre	2015
Norway	Immateriell kulturarv	Arts Council	?
Sweden	Living traditions – an inventory of intangible cultural heritage in Sweden	The Institute for Language and Folklore	?
United Kingdom	ICH Scotland	Museums Galleries Scotland	2011

== Cultural elements from Northern Europe on the Representative List ==
Six intangible cultural heritage elements on UNESCO's representative list originate from the region. Three have been inscribed as elements of Estonia and Lithuania, two as elements of Ireland and Latvia, one for Norway and Finland, and none for Denmark, Iceland, Sweden, and the United Kingdom. Estonia, Lithuania, and Latvia share one cultural heritage element.

The table lists information about each International Cultural Heritage element:

Name: official name, worded as inscribed on the list
Region: region within or outside a country where a heritage is still practiced
Country: country, as inscribed on the list
Year: the year the site was inscribed on the Intangible Cultural Heritage List
Session: the session and decision in which a heritage is inscribed by the committee (Note: The .COM abbreviation is used by UNESCO for committee sessions. 3.COM represents the third session of the committee, 4.COM represents the fourth session, and so on.)
Description: brief description of the heritage
Site: official UNESCO page

Elements of Northern Europe
Name	Region	Country	Year	Session	Description	Site
Baltic song and dance celebrations	Baltic states	Estonia; Latvia; Lithuania	2008	3.COM	UNESCO has inscribed the folk festivals of the Baltic countries, which celebrate the region's heritage of dancing and musical performances. Three events are directly mentioned. The first is the Estonian Song Festival, held once every five years. The event was first held in 1869, when the region was still under the control of Tsarist Russia. The second, the Latvian song festival, is also held every five years, beginning in 1873. The third is the Lithuanian Song and Dance Celebration, held once every four years. The festival originates in Kaunas, and was first celebrated in 1924. The Baltic celebrations attract participants and visitors from around the world. All three events served as a celebration of national pride, and continued, even under the rule of the Soviet Union. During the fall of Communism, revolutions in the region were dubbed "Singing Revolutions", a name derived from the influence of folk festivals on the drive for independence.	.
Kihnu cultural space	Kihnu island and Manilaid island in the Baltic Sea	Estonia	2008	3.COM	UNESCO has inscribed the cultural practices of the Kihnu people. This includes the sealing and fishing traditionally performed by the men, the farming traditionally performed by the women, and the musical performances, celebrations, and handicrafts of the community. The Kihnu people have retained the tradition of performing runic songs, a form of song that predates Christianity. Kihnu clothing, made of wool, are covered with colourful decorations, which serve as representations of the mythology of the community.	.
Seto Leelo, Seto polyphonic singing tradition	Southeastern Estonia and the Pechorsky District of Pskov Oblast, Russia	Estonia	2009	4.COM 13.38	The performance of leelo, a tradition practiced by the Seto people, has been inscribed as an intangible cultural heritage. Leelo is a form of polyphonic singing performed by participants, usually women, dressed in traditional clothing. During the Seto Kingdom Day celebration, the winning lead singer of a leelo group is awarded the title of "Mother of Song".	.
Suiti cultural space	Western Latvia	Latvia	2009	4.COM 14.07	The culture and traditions of the Suiti people are inscribed as an intangible cultural heritage. This includes the community's festivals, celebrations, food, folk clothing, religious practices, language, and dance and musical performances. Living in a region that is largely Protestant, the Suiti people are followers of Catholicism, a belief system that survived the Latvian Soviet Socialist Republic era.	.
Cross-crafting and its symbolism	National	Lithuania	2008	3.COM	Cross-crafting, the art of creating crosses, is a tradition in Lithuania. The practice is part of the Roman Catholic tradition in the region.	.
Sutartinės, Lithuanian multipart songs	Northeastern Lithuania	Lithuania	2010	5.COM 6.26	Sutartinės is a form of Lithuanian folk music. The polyphonic songs are performed during celebrations.	.
Uilleann piping	Ireland	Ireland	2017	12.COM 11.b.16	The practice of playing the uilleann pipes, a highly developed form of bagpipes for playing Irish traditional music	.
Hurling & Camogie	Ireland	Ireland	2018	13.COM	The bat and ball sports originating in Gaelic culture.	.
Practice of traditional music and dance in Setesdal, playing, dancing and singing (stev/stevjing)	Setesdal, Agder County in southern Norway.	Norway	2019	14.COM	In the practice of traditional music and dance in Setesdal, playing, dancing and singing (stev/stevjing), traditional dance and music belong together, interwoven in the social context.	.
Sauna culture in Finland	Finland	Finland	2020	15.COM	Sauna culture, which can take place in homes or public places, involves much more than simply washing oneself. In a sauna, people cleanse their bodies and minds and embrace a sense of inner peace.	.
Inuit drum dancing and singing	Greenland	Denmark	2021	16.COM	Drum dancing and drum singing are indigenous forms of Inuit artistic expression and music in Greenland.	01696
Nordic clinker boat traditions	Nordic countries	Denmark; Finland; Iceland; Norway; Sweden	2021	16.COM	Nordic clinker boats are small, open, wooden boats between five and ten metres long.	01686

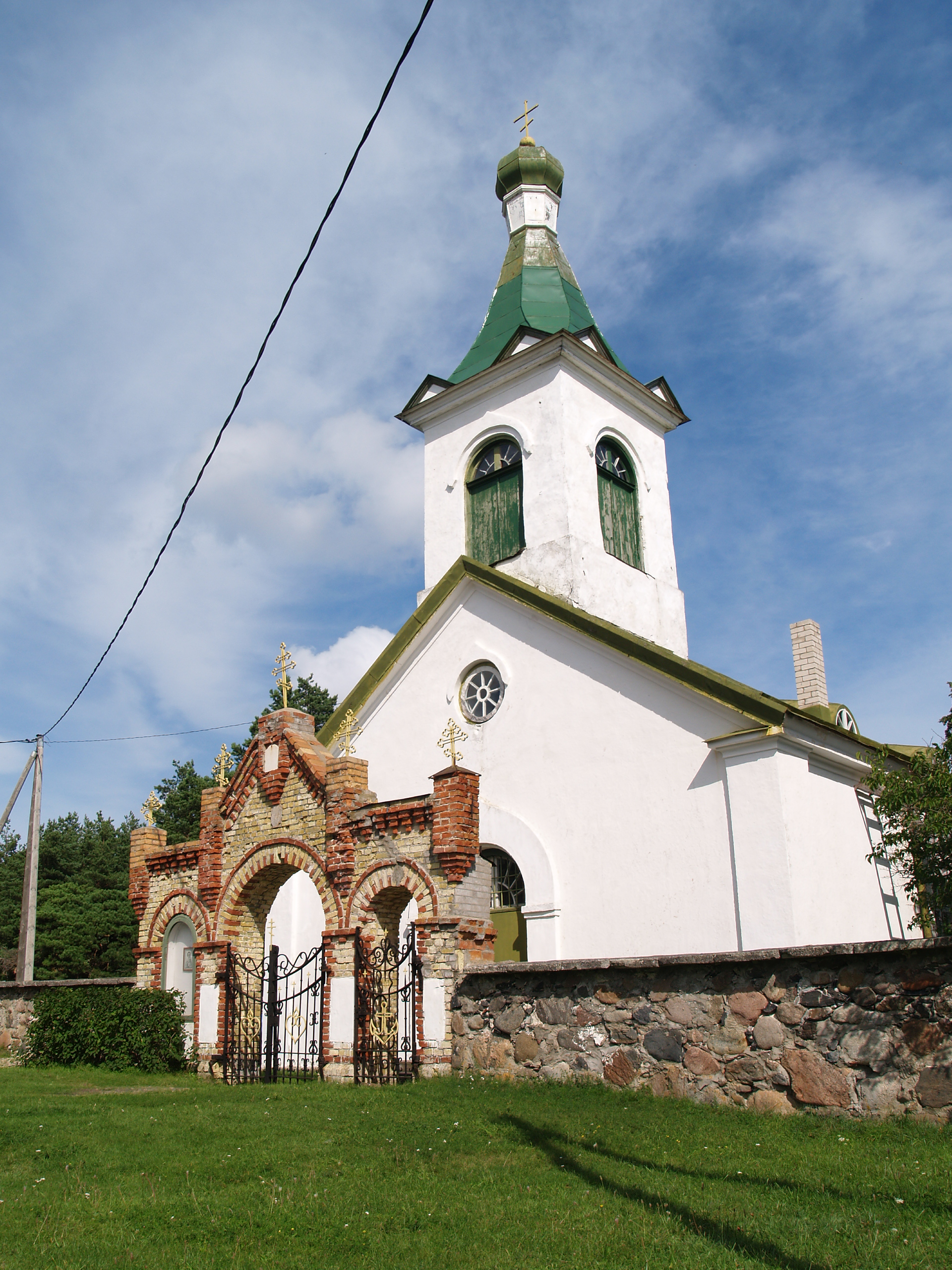
A Kihnu church

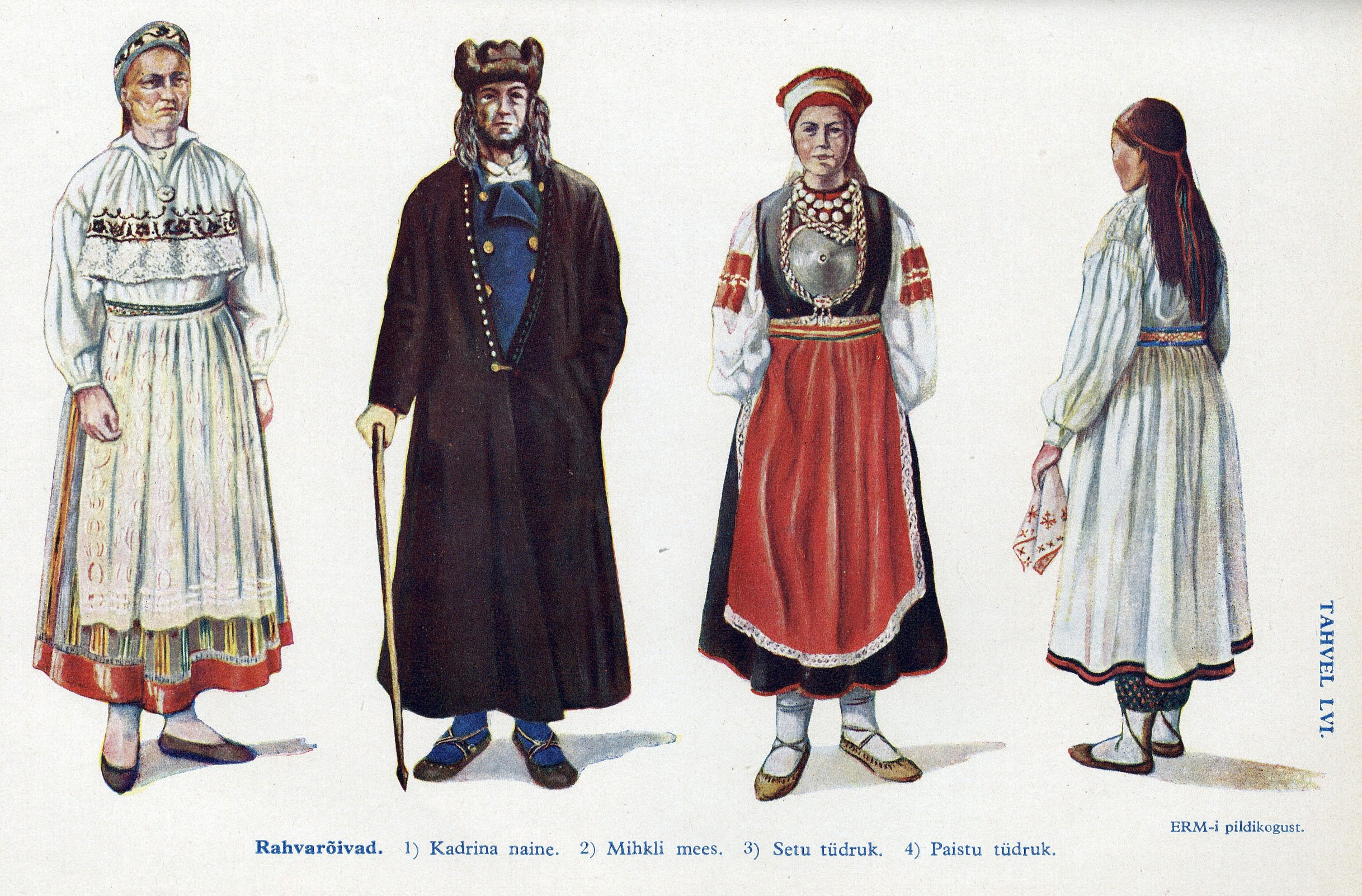
Depiction of a girl in traditional Seto dress, third from the left.

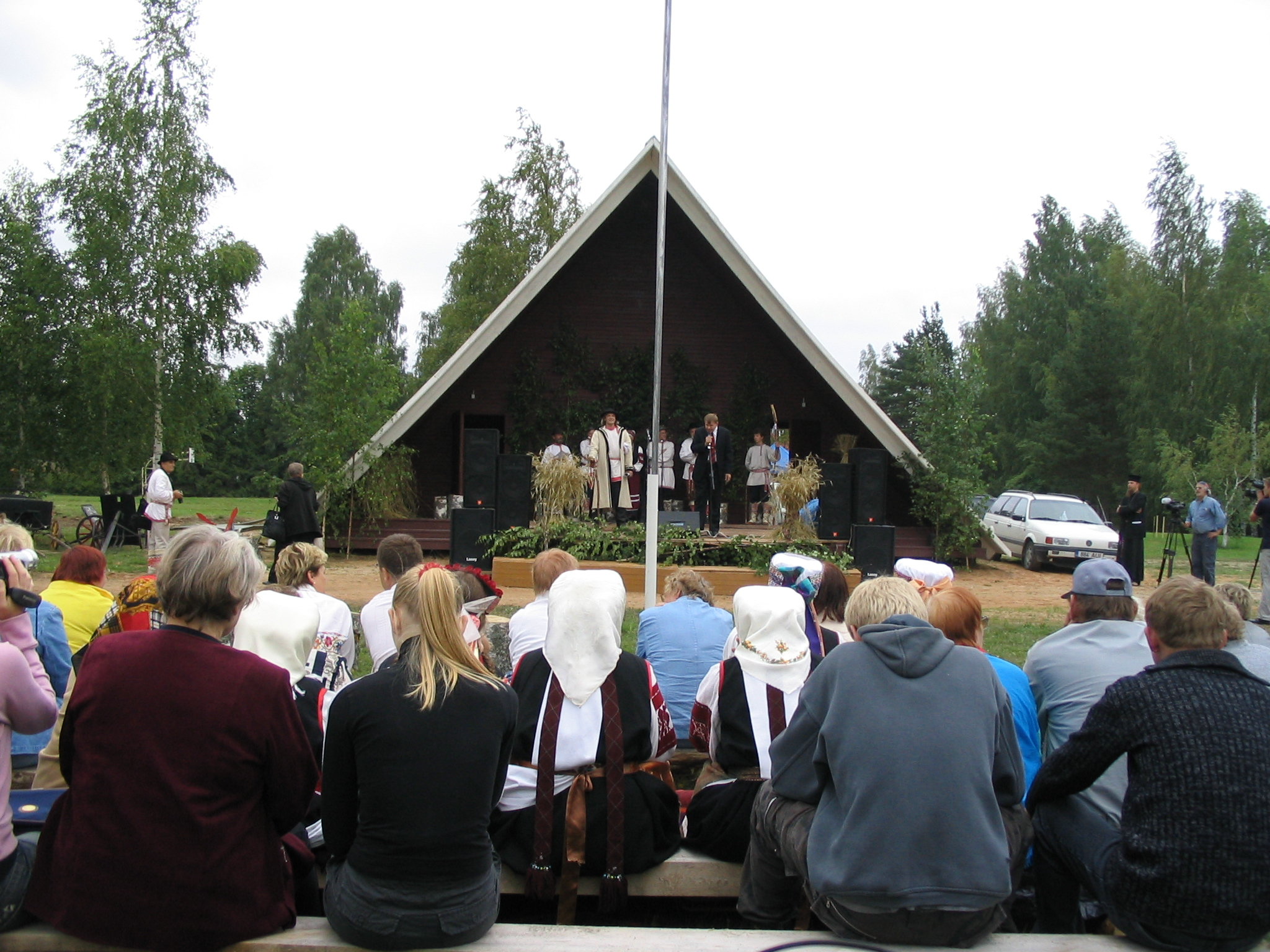
Seto Kingdom Day in 2006.

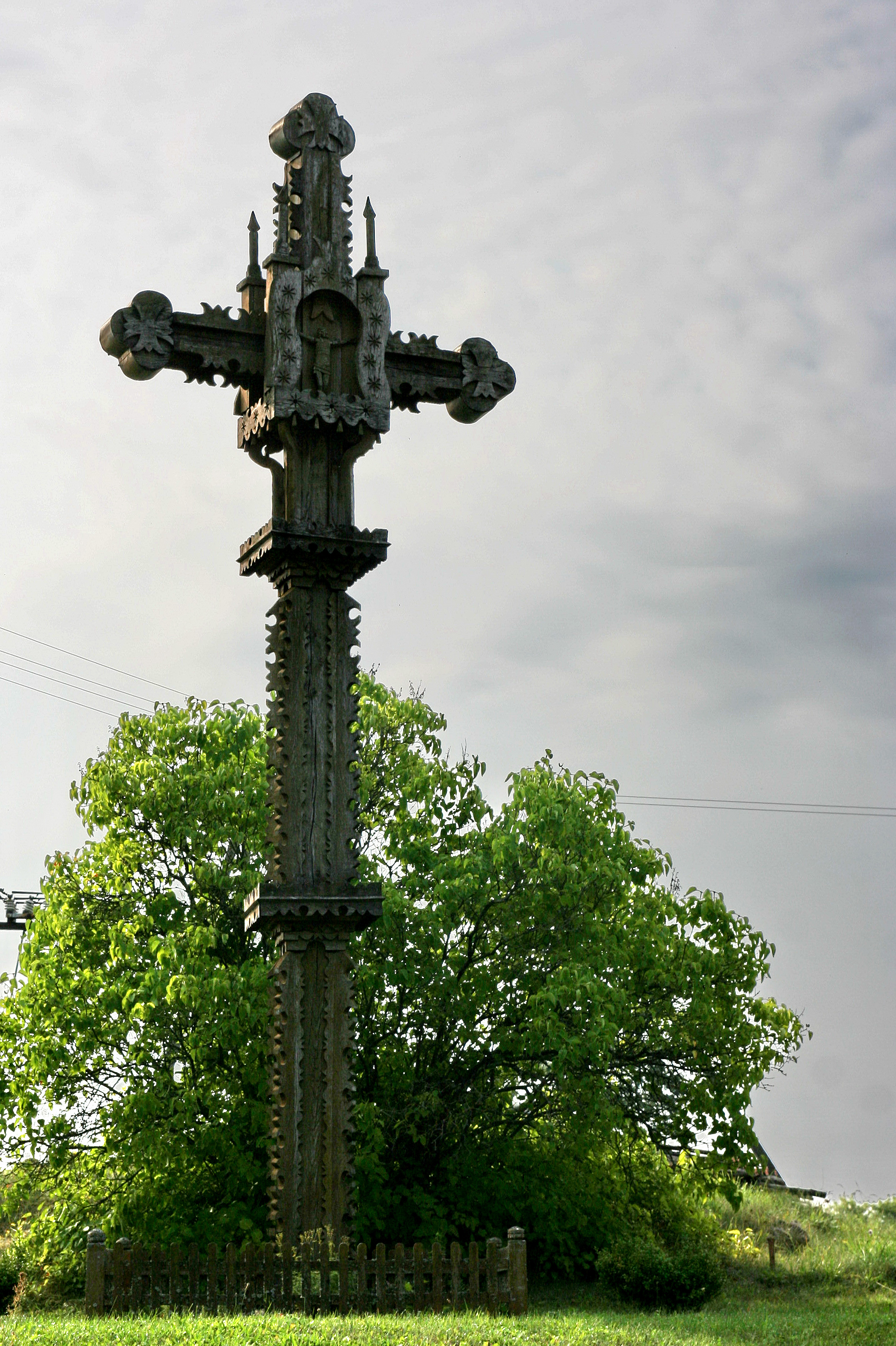
A cross constructed in Lithuania.

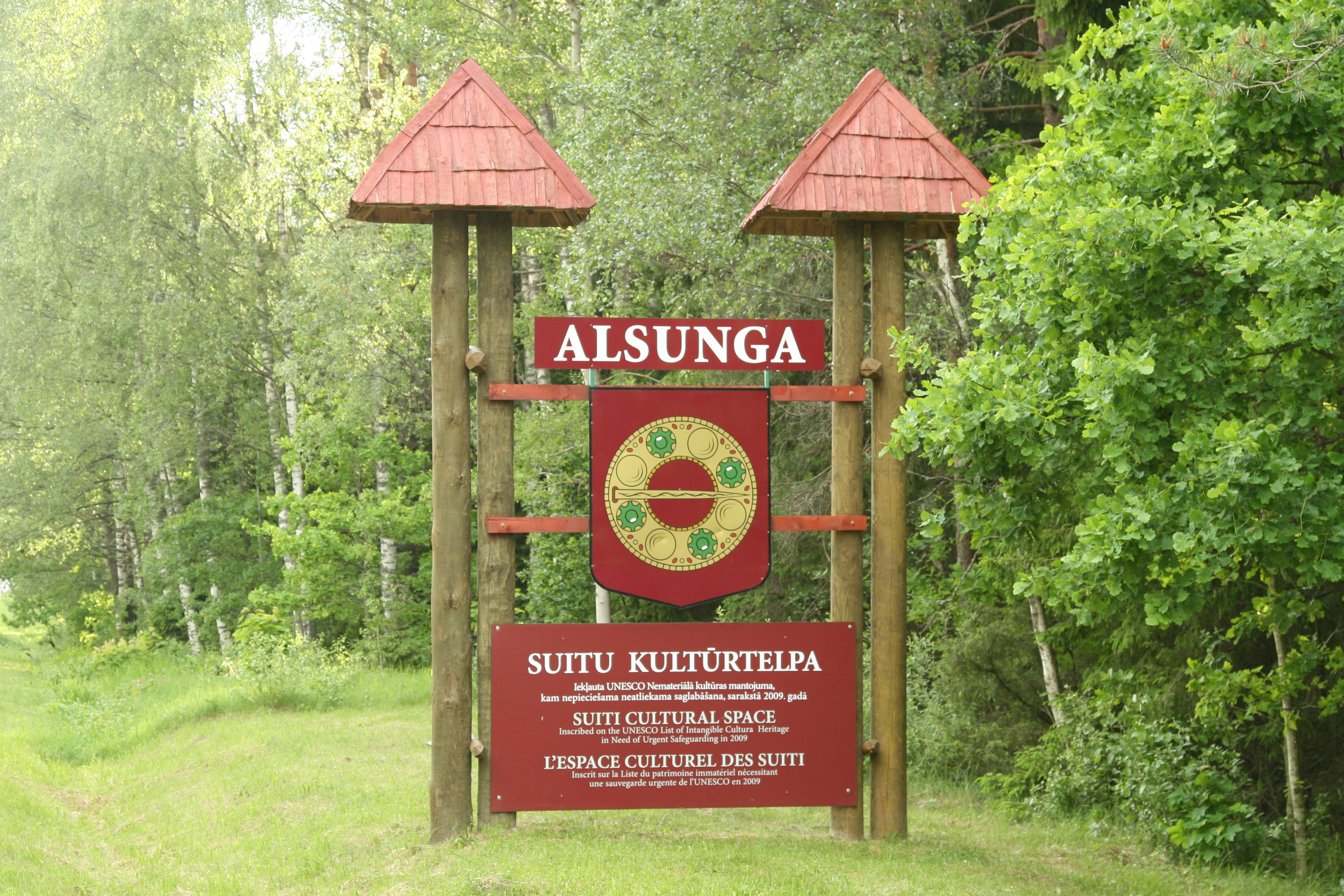
The town sign of Alsunga, center of the Suiti cultural space.

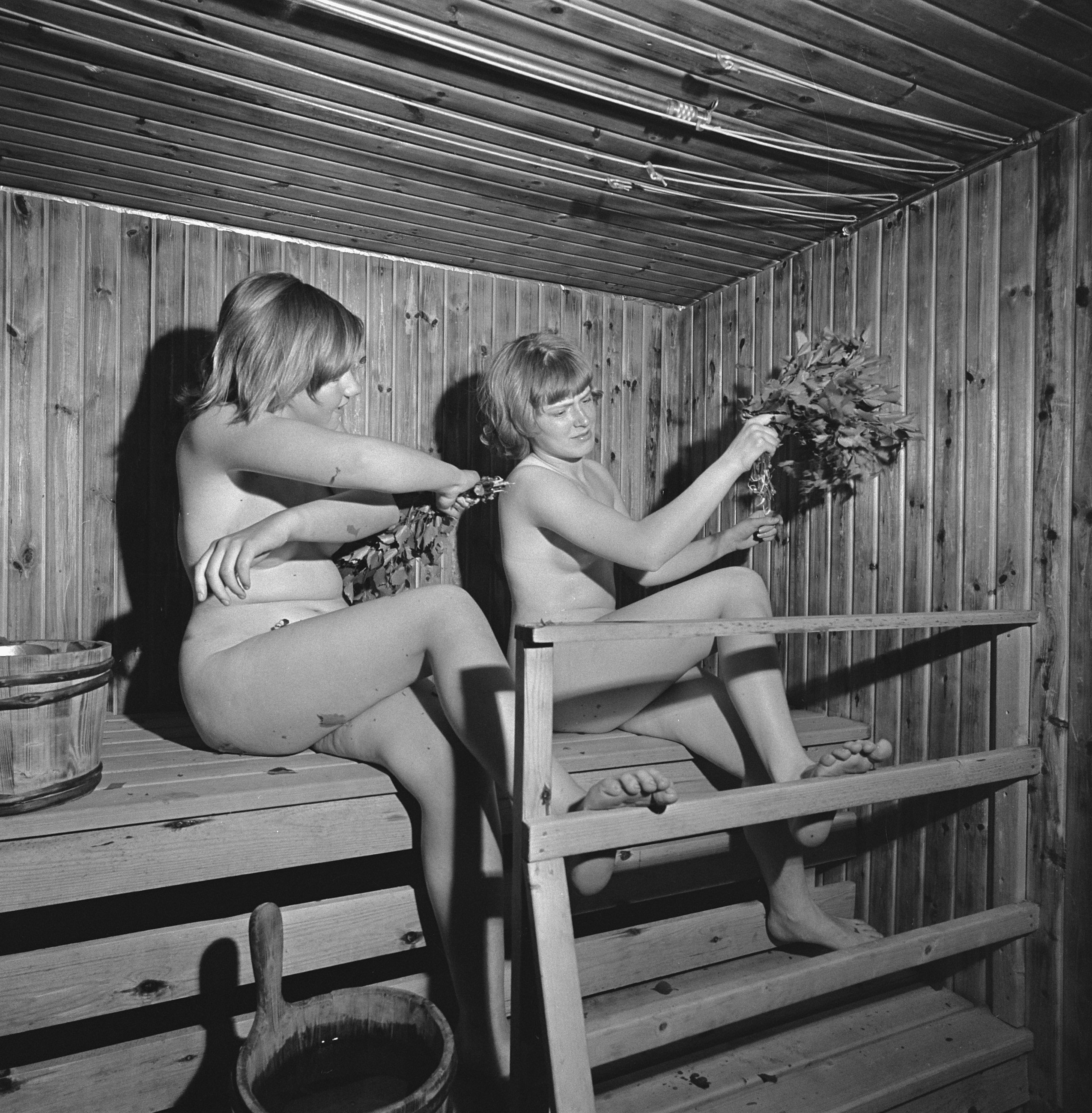
Finnish sauna

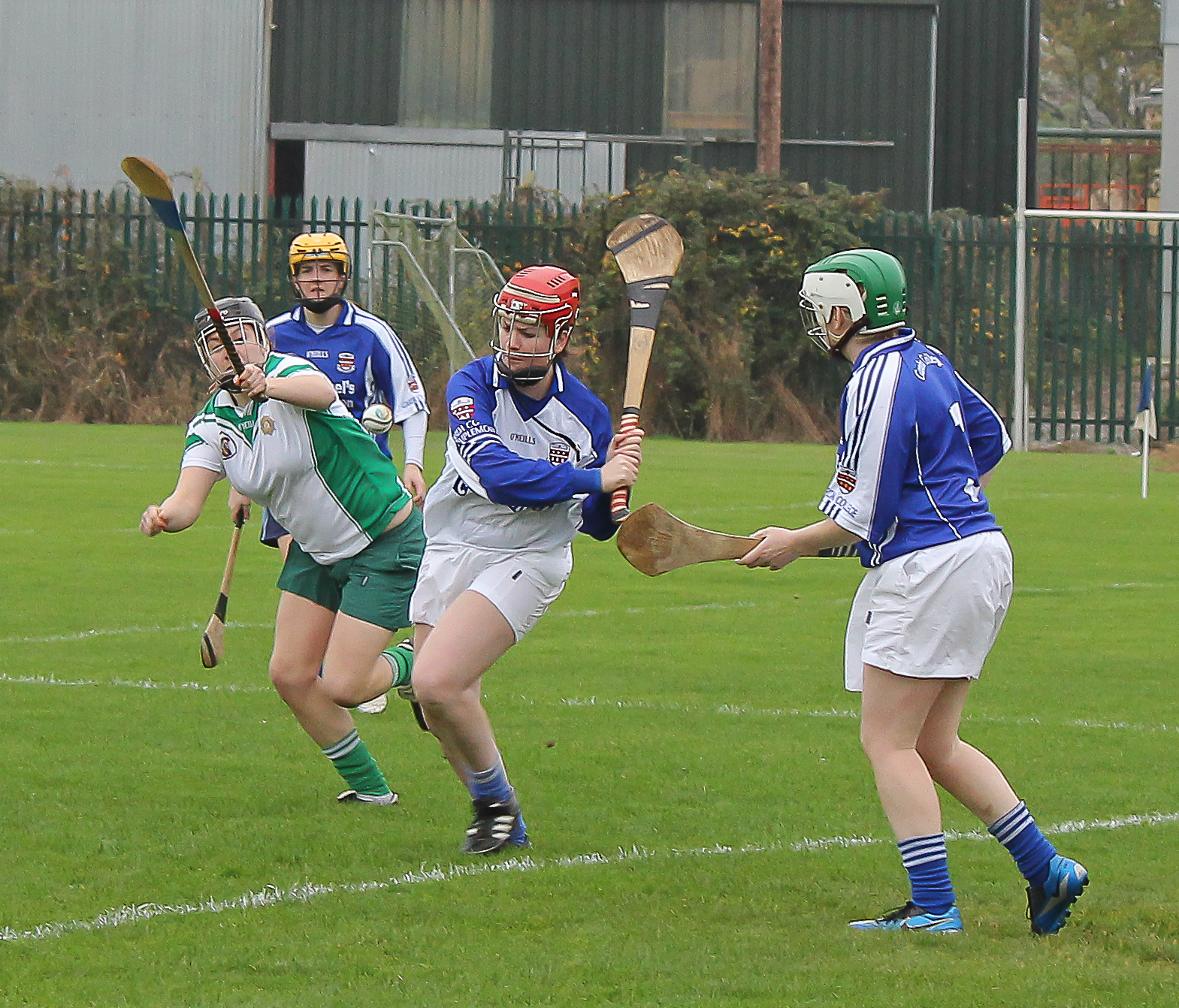
Irish women playing camogie

=== Total heritage elements by country ===
Exclusive heritage elements are those that are inscribed as a heritage of a single country. Shared heritage elements are inscribed as elements of multiple countries. As of 3 November 2012

Total elements by country
Country	Exclusive elements	Shared elements	Ref.
Denmark	1	1	
Estonia	2	1	
Finland	1	1	
Iceland	—	1	
Ireland	2	—	
Latvia	1	1	
Lithuania	2	1	
Norway	1	1	
Sweden	—	1	
United Kingdom	—	—	

== Entries from Northern Europe in the Register of Good Practices ==
The first entry from Northern Europe in the Register of Good Practices was accepted in 2016. Oselvar boat – reframing a traditional learning process of building and use to a modern context is a concept from Norway. A non-profit boatyard and workshop foundation supports the traditional knowledge concerning Oselvar boats.

In 2018, The Land-of-Legends programme in Kronoberg Region (South-Sweden) was added to the registry for promoting and revitalizing the art of storytelling. The organization behind the Land-of Legends programme is the Storytelling Network of Kronoberg, an accredited NGO within the system of the Convention for the Safeguarding of the Intangible Cultural Heritage.

Norway is also part of a multi national entry in the Register of Good Practices, inscribed in 2020. The entry, named Craft techniques and customary practices of cathedral workshops, or Bauhütten, in Europe, know-how, transmission, development of knowledge and innovation, is a joint listing for Norway, Germany, Austria, France, Switzerland.
