= B7 Baltic Islands Network =

Transnational cooperation agreement

B7 Baltic Islands Network was a transnational cooperation between the local administrations or governments of seven islands in the Baltic Sea. The organization existed from 1989 until 2019.

== Scope ==
The network was made up of the local administrations or governments of the islands of Bornholm (Denmark), Gotland (Sweden), Hiiumaa (Estonia), Rügen (Germany), Saaremaa (Estonia), Åland (autonomous part of Finland) and Öland (Sweden).

The network had two decision-making bodies; a "steering committee", which was the politically responsible body, and a managing authority, called the "board". The cooperation was funded by member fees, which were according to population size.

== Purpose ==
The network aimed at promoting the various interests of the islands at national and international level, as well as to function as a platform for exchange of ideas and experiences.
