= Buckingham Group =

Defunct UK construction company

Buckingham Group Contracting Ltd
- Industry: Construction
- Founded: 1 October 1987 (incorporated)
- Defunct: 4 September 2023
- Fate: administration
- Headquarters: Stowe, Buckinghamshire, England, United Kingdom
- Area served: United Kingdom
- Key people: Ian McSeveney (managing director)
- Website: www.buckinghamgroup.co.uk

Buckingham Group Contracting Ltd was a construction company, originally founded in 1955. It was located near Stowe, between Buckingham and Silverstone in north Buckinghamshire and operated throughout England and Wales. It went into administration in 2023 with the loss of over 400 jobs and owing over £302 million to creditors and employees.

A group subsidiary, Buckingham Plant Hire, survived the collapse and continues to trade.

== History ==
It was established in 1955 as Buckingham Plant Hire by founders Paul Wheeler and Patricia Wheeler. The company incorporated in November 1987 as Buckingham Group Contracting Ltd. The company became established as a main contractor undertaking major construction and civil engineering projects, which was headed by Ian McSeveney for many years. McSeveney eventually became the managing director of Buckingham Group.

The company undertook numerous types of civil engineering projects during its existence; it would typically operate as a principal contractor, undertaking major multi-disciplinary construction projects. Such undertakings included business parks, bypasses, and airport faculties.

The company built several sports-related buildings including the £30m London 2012 Olympic handball arena (now known as the Copper Box), a £30m pit lane development for the Silverstone Circuit, and the £93m Falmer Stadium for Brighton and Hove Albion F.C. During 2015, Buckingham Group launched legal action against Northampton Town F.C. over an outstanding sum of £4.8m that it was allegedly owed in relation to the East Stand project. In the early 2020s, the company's work on sports stadiums was cited as one of the primary sources of its fiscal stress, three such projects, one being Fulham's Craven Cottage, were allegedly responsible for steep losses for Buckingham Group and incurring financial commitments that led to financial hardship for the whole company.

In 2019, it was reported that Buckingham Group had recorded a record-breaking turnover of £507 million during the previous financial year.

=== Rail activities ===
Buckingham Group also undertook numerous railway-related civil engineering works. During 2014, a joint venture between Carillion and Buckingham Group was awarded an £87 million contract from Network Rail for works related to the East West Rail project and Chiltern Railways' Oxford and London route. Shortly thereafter, the company was contracted to perform some of the enabling works for electrification schemes underway in North West England. In mid-2021, it was announced that Buckingham Group had secured a £55 million contract for the delivery of numerous works on the Tyne and Wear Metro, including the upgrading and electrification of an existing freight line in South Tyneside. The firm was also involved in the refurbishment of major structures such as the Runcorn Railway Bridge, and the construction of elements of Daventry International Rail Freight Terminal along with various maintenance depots, car parks, and other facilities.

Following the COVID-19 pandemic, the company announced that it planned to redirect its focus towards its railway-related activities, including work on the High Speed 2 project. During September 2023, rival construction company Kier Group purchased Buckingham Group's rail business in exchange for £9.6 million, leading to the transfer of 180 employees.

=== Restructuring, collapse, and administration ===
During September 2021, both the leadership and ownership of Buckingham Group changed drastically; several directors, including the Wheelers, that formerly held a stake in the company agreed to transfer 100% of their equity into the Buckingham Group employee ownership trust, after which they stepped down from their roles in its management. The move turned Buckingham Group into the largest construction contractor in Britain to be taken over by its employees.

On 17 August 2023, the company filed for administration, impacting several ongoing projects, including a £80m 7,000-seat stand at Liverpool's Anfield stadium, a stand at Northampton Town's Sixfields Stadium, redevelopment of Birmingham City's St Andrew's stadium, restoration of Whitley Bay Metro station, new sidings at Beckton for the Docklands Light Railway, and the mixed-use £135m Copr Bay development in Swansea. In September 2023, the group formally went into administration, with Grant Thornton appointed as administrators. Shortly thereafter, 446 staff – across building, civil engineering, demolition, major projects, and sport and leisure operations – were axed, while several ongoing projects were taken over by other firms. It was the biggest collapse in Britain's construction sector since the liquidation of Carillion in January 2018.

Subcontractors were reportedly owed in excess of £100m. Debts on Liverpool's new Anfield Road Stand alone were around £20m. A 29 September 2023 report from the administrator Grant Thornton confirmed trade contractors and suppliers were owed over £108m, with 1,200 unsecured creditors unlikely to see any kind of return. Buckingham Group had around £5m in the bank when it entered administration. In January 2024, the total trade debt was revised upwards to £113m, while Buckingham's employees were owed a further £8.2m. In April 2024, administrators revealed that 1,375 claims had been received, revising the total trade debt to £256m; this total could rise further as claims from former employees progress through tribunals. In October 2024, Grant Thornton said it had received 1,391 claims worth £302.2m, with suppliers and subcontractors unlikely to receive any payments.

In October 2025, administrators Grant Thornton said the contractor was owed "significant sums" when it collapsed, and they were preparing for legal action against one of the group's debtors if an informal settlement offer was not accepted. Grant Thornton had recouped £18.5m worth of assets, but the complexities and timescales involved in collecting debts" meant it had to extend the administration process by two years, to 4 September 2027.

In September 2026, Avison Young, a consultancy overseeing work by Buckingham Group, was adjudged to have over-claimed at least £7.69m for earthmoving work at a SEGRO development near Coventry in 2023.

== Buckingham Plant Hire ==
The group's plant hire business, Buckingham Plant Hire, was initially said to be unaffected by the collapse of the contracting arm and continued to trade profitably. However, it was owed around £1.8m, according to the administrator's creditors' report. In January 2025, it announced it was selling its heavy machinery and focusing on light plant services due to the collapse of Buckingham Group Contracting, its biggest customer.
