= Beckton Depot =

Primary maintenance depot for the Docklands Light Railway

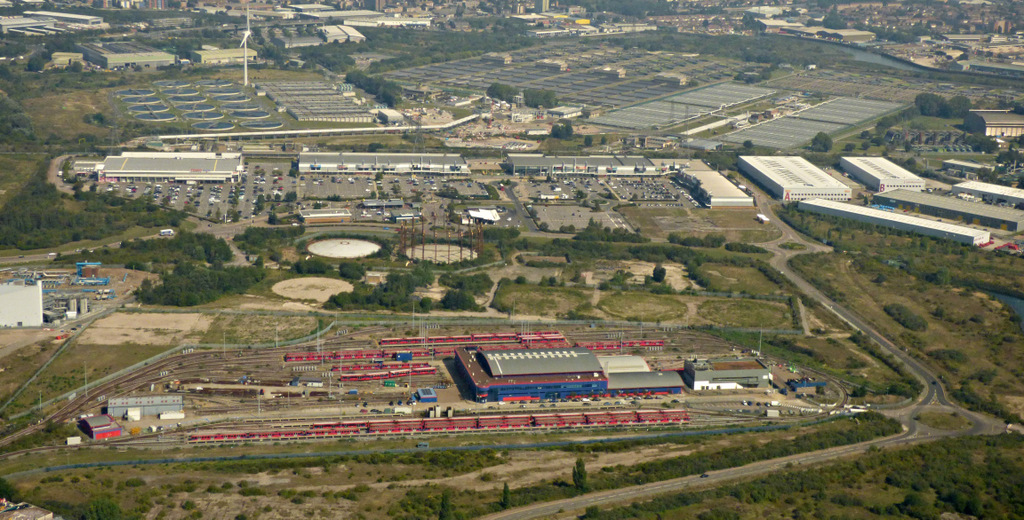
- Aerial photograph of Beckton Depot
- Interactive map of Beckton Depot

Location
- Location: Beckton, London
- Coordinates: 51.51209°N 0.07693°E

Characteristics
- Type: light metro

History
- Opened: 1994

Beckton Depot is the primary railway maintenance depot for the Docklands Light Railway (DLR).

== History ==
Upon the initial opening of the DLR in 1987, Poplar DLR depot was the primary maintenance depot. But the proposed extension to Beckton would require more maintenance facilities, and Beckton provided more space in which to both construct larger facilities and provide easier road access for rolling stock delivery. The depot was built on part of the site of the former Beckton Gas Works, and was opened with the extension to Beckton in March 1994 with capacity for 45 single car trains.

The depot is the primary maintenance depot for the DLR, providing both servicing and stabling facilities. Located between Beckton and Gallions Reach stations, it is actually closer to the latter – with rail access is from spurs from the running lines from the Beckton branch (in both directions). Road access to the site is off Armada Way, south of the Gallions Reach Shopping Park.

=== Expansion ===
In the early 2000s, the DLR network was upgraded and expanded – with extensions to London City Airport and Woolwich, as well as the implementation of 3 car trains across the network. To facilitate this, the depot was extended and upgraded in 2005 and 2006, with additional sidings for 36 new trains and improved signalling.

As of the early 2020s, the depot is being extended to accommodate the new B23 rolling stock. The first phase provides space for additional trains, as well as modify the existing maintenance building to allow for easier servicing of the new rolling stock. The second phase will provide additional train stabling facilities, allowing for the rebuilding of Poplar DLR depot with residential towers above a retained depot.

Buckingham Group was awarded the £35m contract for the first phase in 2021, commissioned to construct a new carriage wash, extension and modification to existing track, and new sidings for the new trains. The work was scheduled for completion in September 2023, but Buckingham went into administration the previous month (August 2023). TfL appointed Morgan Sindall to complete the work, alongside their £90m deal for the second phase, to build a new train shed and deliver further sidings. By August 2024, the northern sidings were completed, with the maintenance building and southern sidings under construction.

This latest expansion project is expected to be completed by the summer of 2028.

== See also ==
- Docklands Light Railway rolling stock
