= Poplar Depot =

Secondary depot and headquarters for the Docklands Light Railway

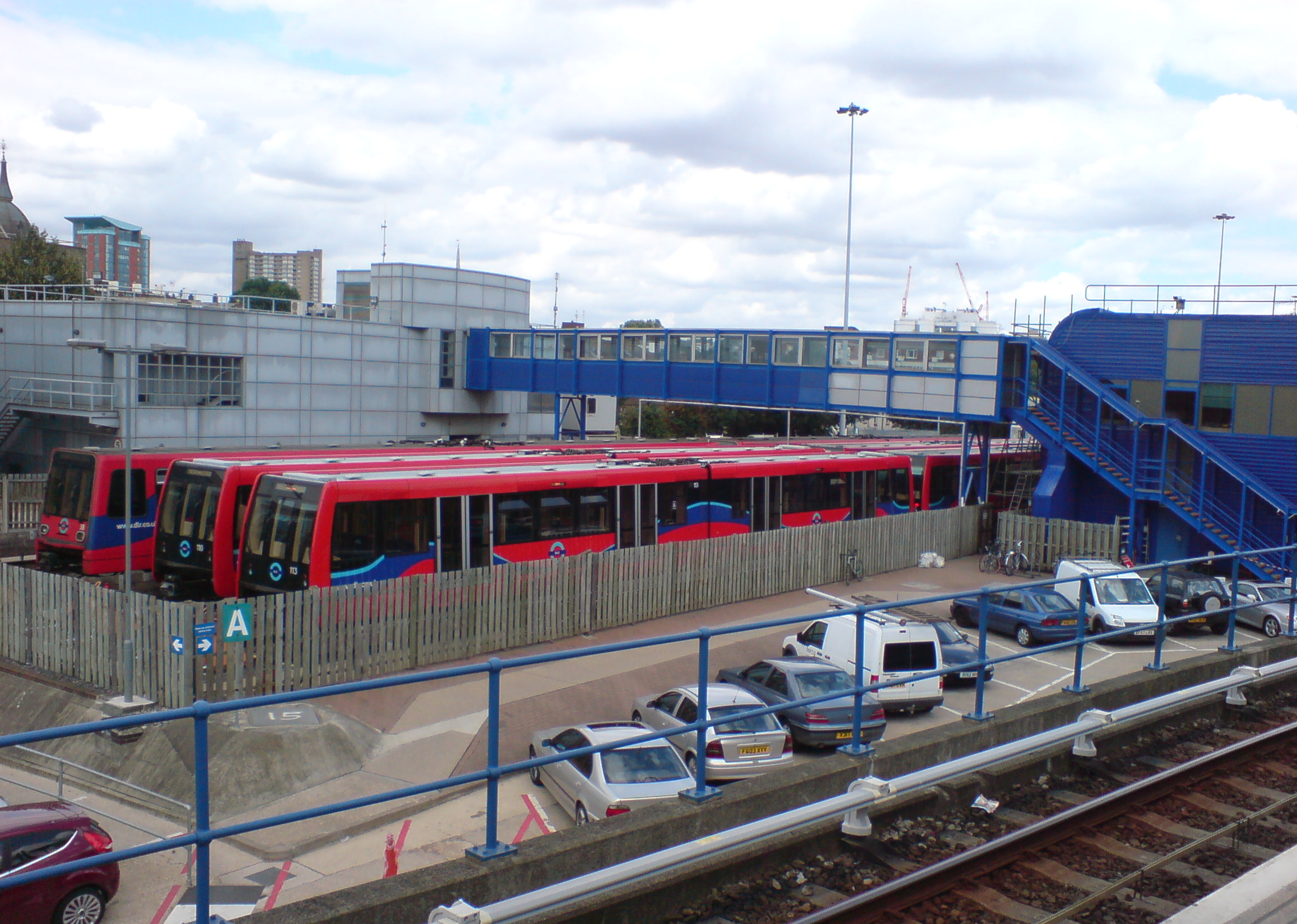
- Trains stabled at the depot, viewed from Poplar DLR station

Location
- Location: Poplar, London
- Coordinates: 51.5075°N 0.0167°W

Characteristics
- Type: light metro

History
- Opened: August 1987; 37 years ago

Poplar Depot, also known as the Operations and Maintenance Centre (OMC), is the secondary depot and headquarters for the Docklands Light Railway (DLR) in Poplar, London. It is located adjacent to Poplar DLR station.

== History ==
The depot opened in August 1987 as part of the initial DLR system. Due to the constrained site at Poplar, a new, larger depot was built at Beckton - which replaced Poplar as the main train depot in 1994. Over half the fleet are stored and maintained here. It is situated to the north of Poplar station and has two additional sidings next to All Saints. The depot was extended to hold more trains, when three-car operation began in 2009.

=== Future ===
Given the depot's location close to Canary Wharf, Transport for London have proposed rebuilding the depot to have residential towers built above it. This would require expansion of the Beckton depot to allow for construction at Poplar.

== See also ==
- Docklands Light Railway rolling stock
