= Millwall =

Area of the Isle of Dogs in London, England

Coordinates: 51°29′20″N 00°01′12″W

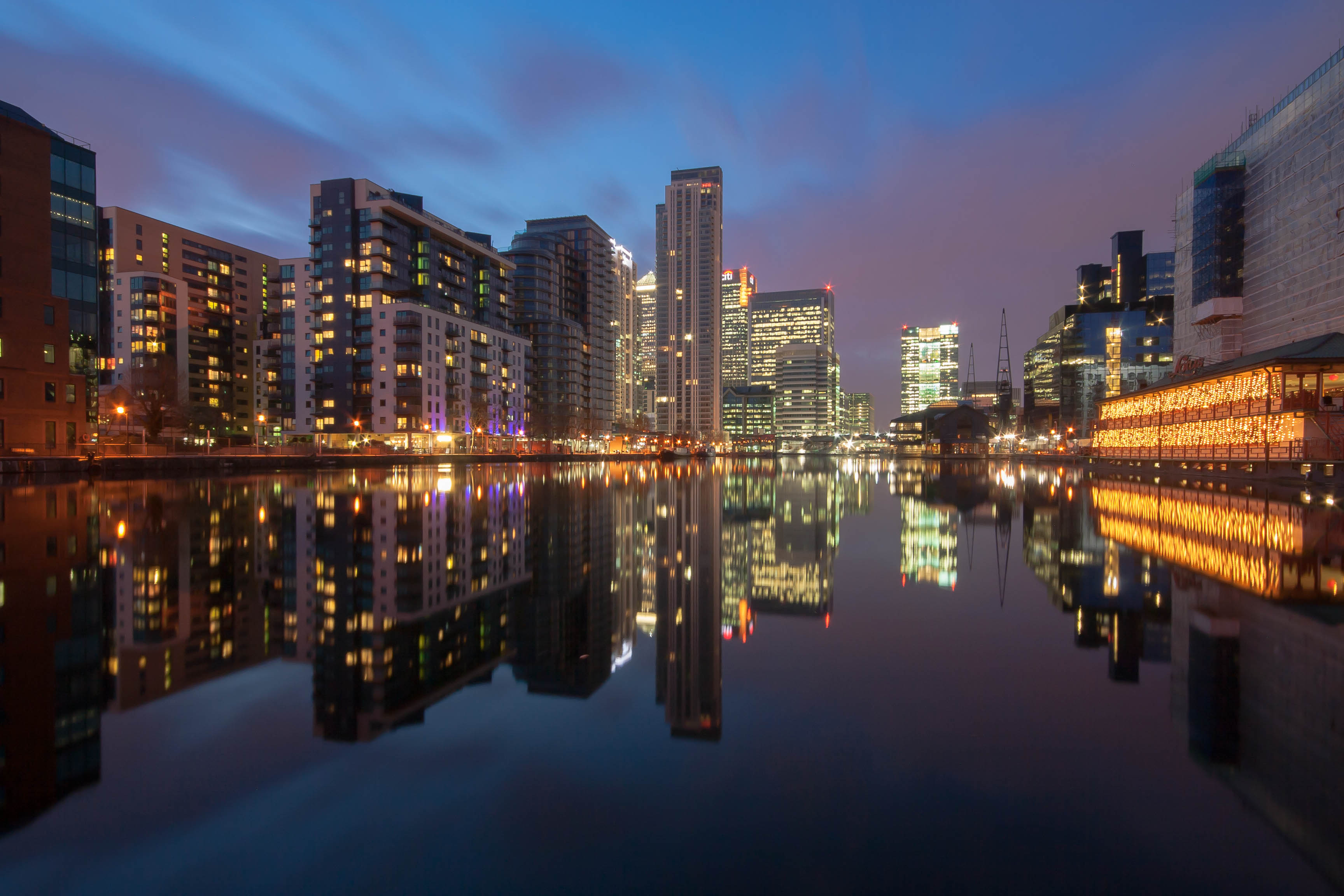
- The Millwall Dock at night

- Location within Greater London
- OS grid reference: TQ375785
- London borough: Tower Hamlets
- Ceremonial county: Greater London
- Region: London
- Country: England
- Sovereign state: United Kingdom
- Post town: LONDON
- Postcode district: E14
- Dialling code: 020
- Police: Metropolitan
- Fire: London
- Ambulance: London
- UK Parliament: Poplar and Limehouse
- London Assembly: City and East

Millwall (/ˈmɪlwɔːl/) is a district on the western and southern side of the Isle of Dogs, in east London, England, in the London Borough of Tower Hamlets. It lies to the immediate south of Canary Wharf and Poplar, north of Greenwich and Deptford, east of Rotherhithe, west of Cubitt Town, and has a long shoreline along London's Tideway, part of the River Thames. It was part of the County of Middlesex and from 1889, following the passing of the Local Government Act 1888, the County of London; it later became part of Greater London in 1965.

Millwall had a population of 23,084 in 2011 and includes Island Gardens, The Quarterdeck and The Space.

== History ==
A map showing the Millwall ward of Poplar Metropolitan Borough as it appeared in 1916.

Millwall is a smaller area of land than an average parish, as it was part of Poplar until the 19th century when it became heavily industrialised, containing the workplaces and homes of a few thousand dockside and shipbuilding workers. Among its factories were the shipbuilding ironworks of William Fairbairn, much of which survives as today's Burrells Wharf. It was in this era also that Millwall F.C. was founded, in 1885, as Millwall Rovers. First nicknamed 'the Dockers' before becoming 'the Lions', the team moved south of the river to New Cross in 1910, however a set of amateur football pitches remain, adjoining Cubitt Town alongside the City Farm that was added in the 20th century.

Originally known as Marshwall, the area acquired its new name with its breakaway from its former parish of Poplar. The replacement was due to the large number of windmills built on the river wall in the 18th century.

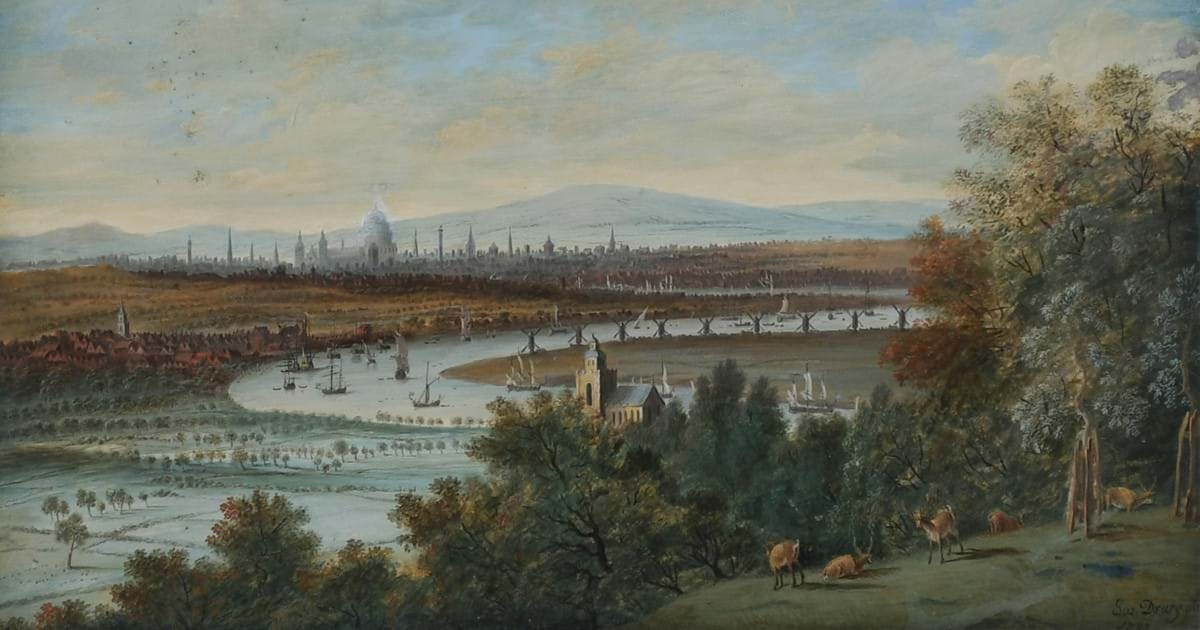
View of Millwall, London in 1733

Improvements led by the Lord Mayor William Cubitt in reinforcing the land solved the periodic flooding caused by major snow melt and spring tides. Corn and wheat were brought along the River Thames to be ground into flour there.

On 31 January 1858, the largest ship of that time, the SS Great Eastern, designed by Isambard Kingdom Brunel, was launched from Napier Yard, the shipyard leased by Messrs J Scott Russell & Co. The 211 metre (692 ft) length was too wide for the river, and the ship had to be launched sideways. A section of the concrete and timber substructure from the launch site is now preserved on-site for public display at the modern Napier Avenue. Due to the technical difficulties of the launch, this was the last ship of such a size to be built on the island, though other builders such as Yarrows and Samuda Brothers continued building warships on the island for another 50 years. They are commemorated in the names of the Samuda Estate on Manchester Road, and Yarrow House on Stewart Street.

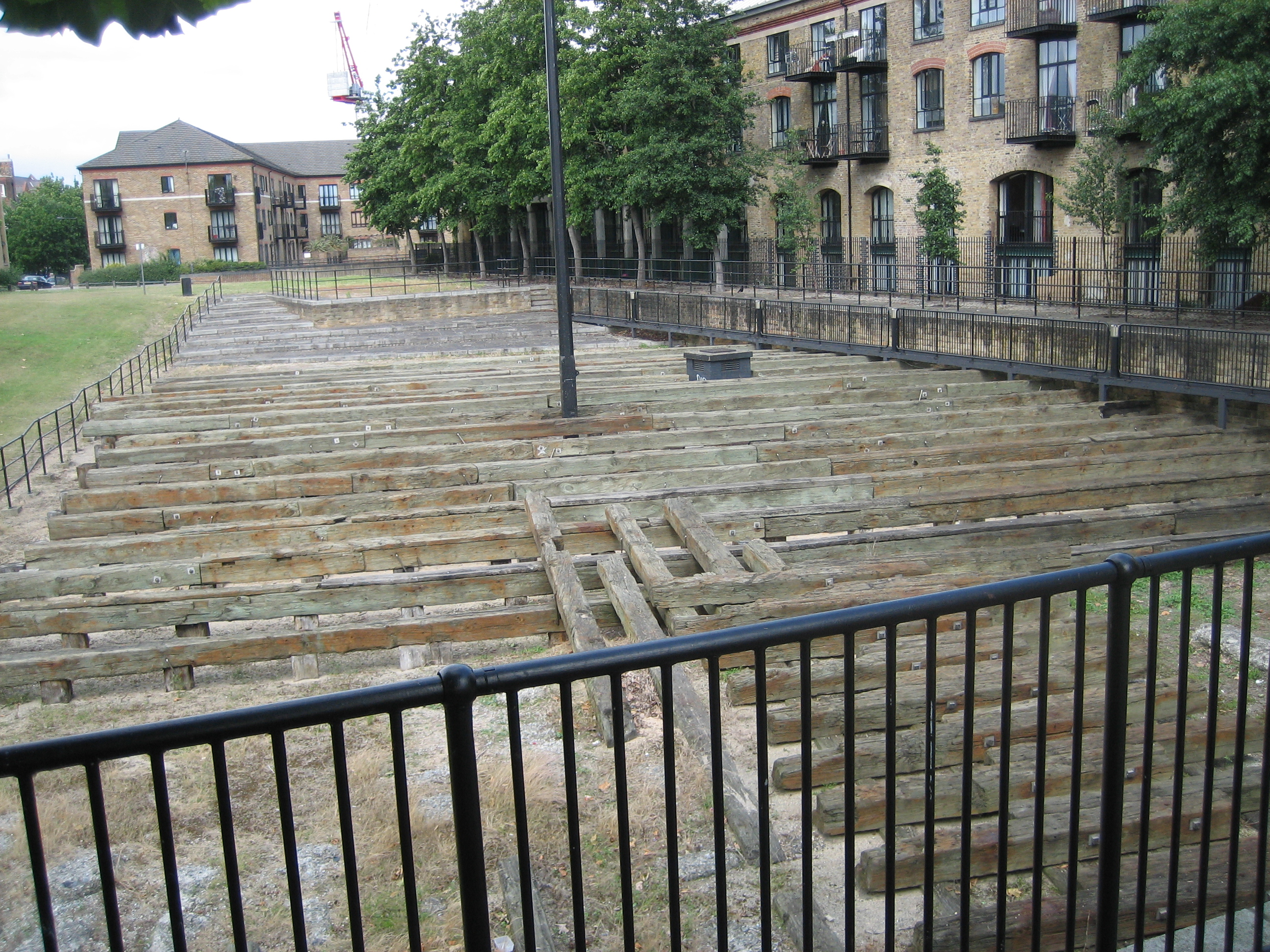
Some of the concrete and timber sub-structure of Great Eastern's launch ramp.

In the 1860s the large Millwall Dock was built, extending from the Thames at Millwall into the centre of the Isle of Dogs. The spoil from the dock was left as the Mudchute.

During the 19th century, the area now called Island Gardens was referred to as North Greenwich, for the North Greenwich railway station that was opened in 1872 to connect with the ferry that was the forerunner of the Greenwich foot tunnel. The Greenwich peninsula, previously East Greenwich, is now also known by this epithet for the North Greenwich tube station.

Like other parts of the Isle of Dogs, substantial redevelopment has been more or less ongoing since the 1980s, resulting in modern industrial and commercial buildings and hastily constructed contemporary housing beginning to predominate over the remaining early 20th century "two up, two down" semi-detached and terraced homes that housed the dock workers, often overcrowded with occupants. The loss of the docks, the German campaign of bombings in the area, and the gradual disappearance of the manufacturing and distribution industries led to a fall in population during the mid-20th century and ongoing problems for local workers who relied on shipping and manufacturing for employment.

The post-World War II period saw the area become a focus of regeneration programmes on the former industrial land in Millwall. Initially led by Poplar Borough Council (eventually absorbed into Tower Hamlets) and London County Council, regeneration efforts focused on council house building until the 1980s when the London Docklands Development Corporation was created and development shifted to private, even luxury, office and residential buildings. During this period the area's population increased significantly following the above-mentioned mid-century drop.

The area is home to a number of council estates including West Ferry Estate, Millwall Estate, Masthouse Terrace, Herperus Crescent Estate and Chapel House Street Estate. The Barkantine Estate, commissioned by the London County Council with the first section opened in 1968, dominates a swathe of the northern section of Millwall.

== Sport ==
Millwall is most famous for its football club, Millwall F.C., founded in 1885 as Millwall Rovers. Nicknamed The Dockers (now known as The Lions), the team moved south of the river to New Cross in 1910. Occupying four separate grounds on the Isle of Dogs in the 25 years since its formation as a football club, they now play in Bermondsey and retain the name Millwall despite not having played in the Millwall area for more than 100 years.

Millwall Rugby Club was formed in 1995. The first team plays in the Essex Division 1 league and the seconds are in the Essex Merit Table (Division 2), while the thirds are playing in the Merit Table (Division 5), having won Division 6 last season. They now also have women's rugby - the Millwall Venus girls - and a youth section for boys and girls from eight years old.

The Docklands Sailing and Watersports Centre is located at the far west end of the dock where the dock previously connected to the River Thames. It was set up in 1989 by the London Docklands Development Corporation and the Sports Council at a cost of £1.2 million.

== Politics ==
Millwall gained some notoriety when, in a council by-election in 1993, Derek Beackon won the British National Party's first council seat there. After a major anti-fascist campaign, the BNP lost the seat at the following full council election.

In September 2004, Tower Hamlets' Respect party fought its second council election in the borough, standing local activist Paul McGarr. In this previously 'solid' Labour seat, Labour were pushed into third place, and the local Conservative party took its first ever seat on Tower Hamlets council. In the 2006 local elections, the Conservatives took all three seats, defeating former MP Alan Amos.

The Millwall ward was subsequently abolished in 2014, largely replaced by the new wards of Canary Wharf and Island Gardens. These retained the Conservative leanings of the old Millwall ward, and as of 2018 they each have one Conservative and one Labour councillor. These are the only two Conservative councillors on Tower Hamlets council.

== Demographics ==
White British people comprise 31% of the population of the Millwall ward of the London Borough of Tower Hamlets. This is followed by Other White people (19.9%) and Bangladeshis (14.6%).

45.1% of people living in Millwall were born in England, with a number of other countries represented including Bangladesh (6.8%), India (4.7%), and China (4.3%).

The religious make up of Millwall is 32.1% Christian, 22.0% No religion, 18.0% Muslim, 4.9% Hindu, 1.9% Buddhist, 0.4% Sikh, and 0.4% Jewish.

The gender balance in Millwall is 53% male and 47% female.

== Amenities ==
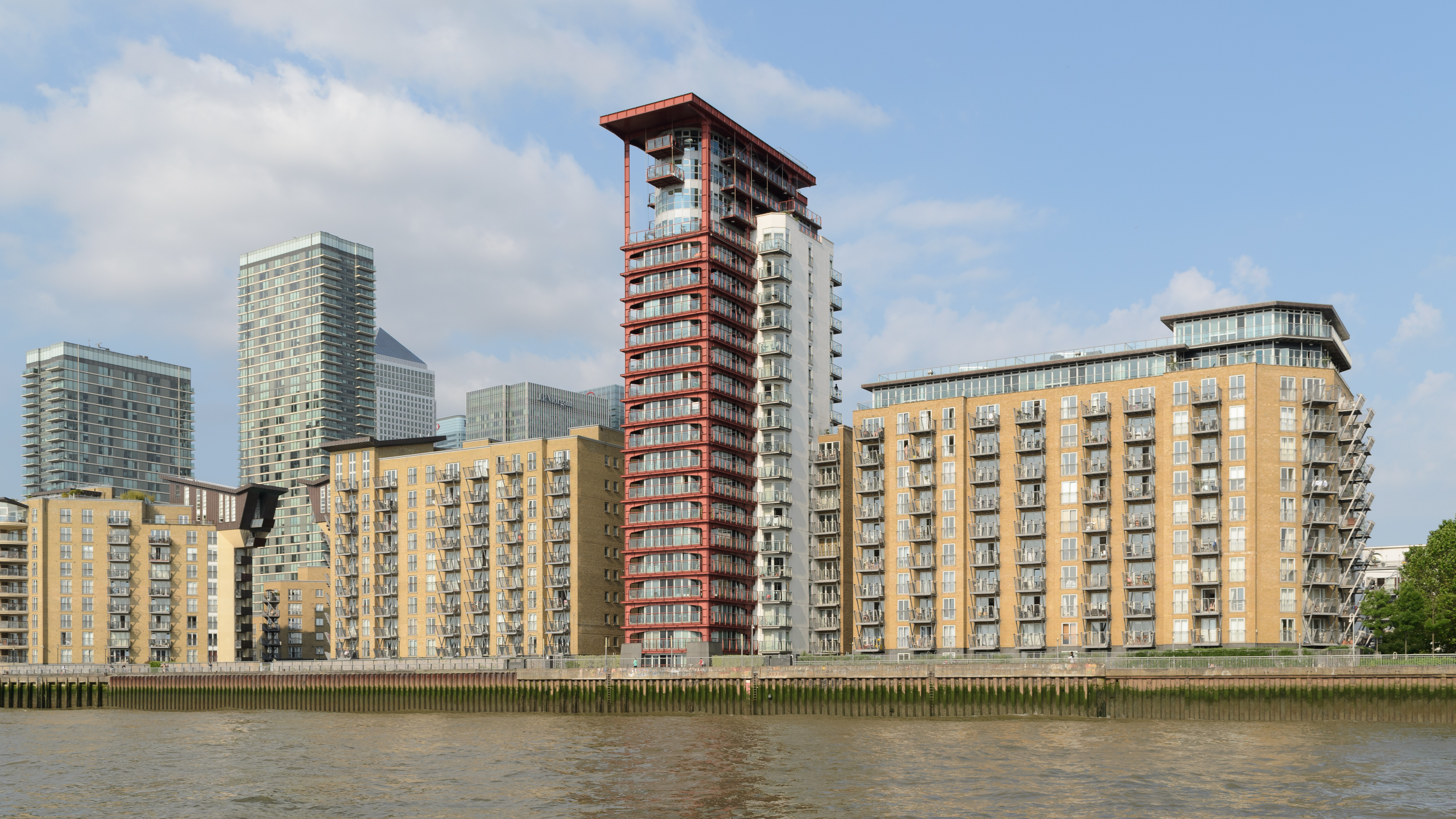
Millwall skyline from the Thames (2016)

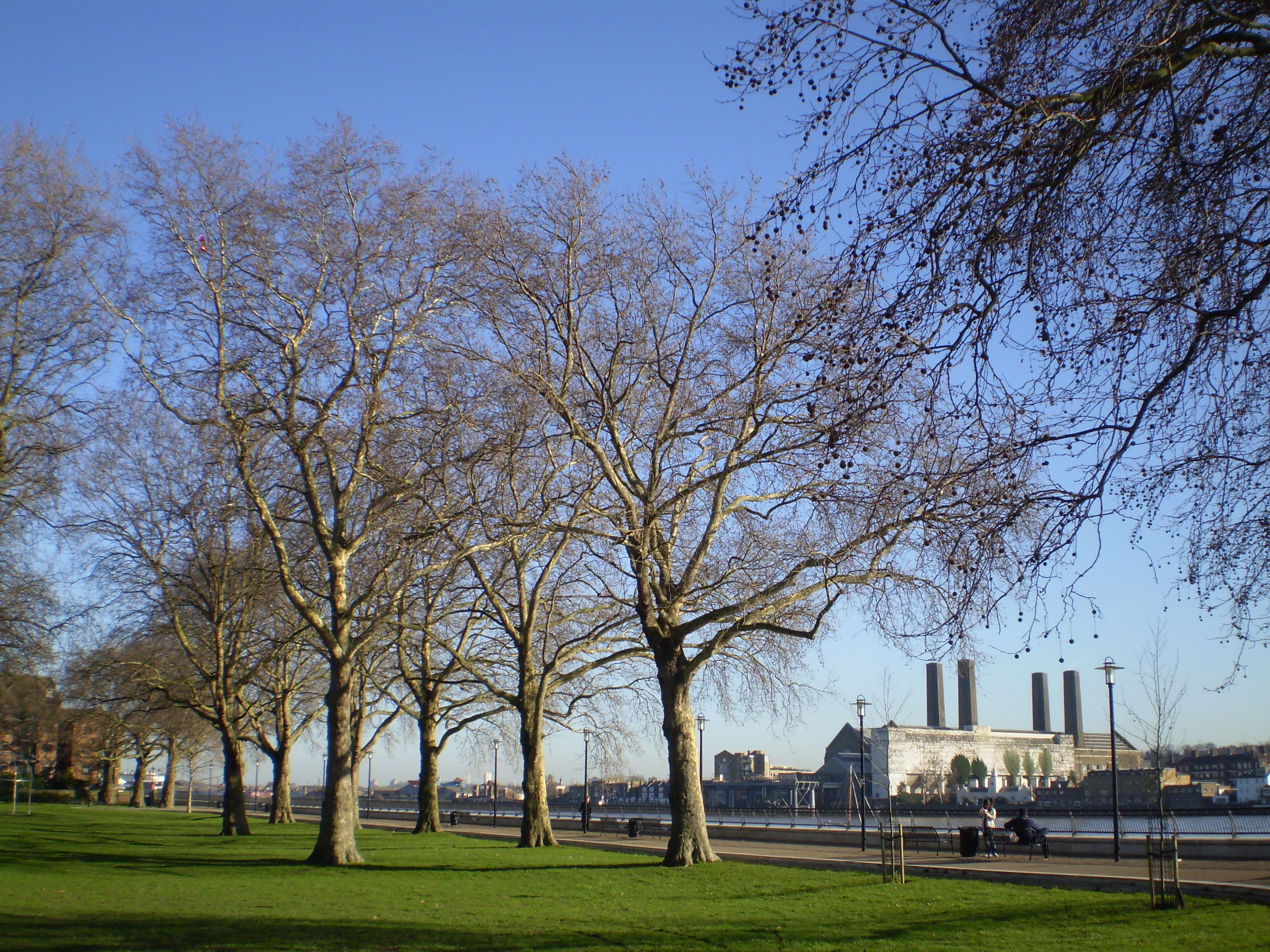
Island Gardens (New Years Day 2008)

The historical Island Gardens, opened on 3 August 1895 by local politician Will Crooks, is located almost in front of the former Greenwich Hospital, the Cutty Sark, National Maritime Museum and Greenwich Park.

=== Landmarks ===
The Ferry House is a pub on Ferry Street has existed since the Tudor period (1485–1603). The present building dates from 1822, and was used as a drinking establishment by ferry passengers to and from Greenwich until the opening of the Greenwich foot tunnel in 1902.

The Ship Inn pub was built in 1835, it is thought by two houses merge into a public house, it has been a pub all its history and is next to Burrells Wharf, where during his time there Isambard Kingdom Brunel may have frequented The Ship. Today it is run by a local, independently run business.

The decision to proceed with the large Barkantine Estate housing estate development was made in March 1965, with first block being opened in 1968, and originally consisted of 634 dwellings. It included a pedestrianized shopping promenade called The Quarterdeck, and a pub called the Tooke Arms, relocated and rebuilt at the same time.

Mudchute Park and Farm was created with the spoil from excavating the Millwall Docks in the 1860s and occupies 32 acres of countryside

The Space is located inside a former Presbyterian church that was built in 1859 for the Scottish Presbyterian congregation who had migrated to the Isle of Dogs to work in the shipyards, which was designed by Thomas Knightley.

== Industry ==
A large site on the north side of Millwall Dock Outer Dock was occupied by the West Ferry Printing Works, the largest newspaper print works in Western Europe.

== Transport ==
South Quay, Crossharbour. Mudchute and Island Gardens on the Docklands Light Railway, and Canary Wharf on the London Underground with the Jubilee and Elizabeth lines serving the nearby Canary Wharf estate.

Bus routes 135, 277, D7, D8, N550 all operate within the area.

The nearest pier is Masthouse Terrace Pier for London River Services.

Millwall is connected to the National Road Network by the north-south Westferry Road A1206.

On the north bank of the River Thames is the National Trail Thames Path for both cyclists and walkers, and the National Cycle Route 1 on the National Cycle Network, running from Dover to Shetland.

== See also ==
- Millwall Rugby Football Club
- Millwall brick
- 1996 Docklands bombing
- Canary Wharf
