= Burrells Wharf =

Residential estate in London, England

Coordinates: 51.4879°N 0.0196°W

Burrells Wharf is a riverside residential estate, owned by its leaseholders, in London, England. It is situated on the Isle of Dogs in Millwall and the north bank of the River Thames (facing Deptford) in the London Borough of Tower Hamlets. The residential estate is one of 18 buildings or groups of buildings on the peninsula to be architecturally listed as buildings of special interest or importance.

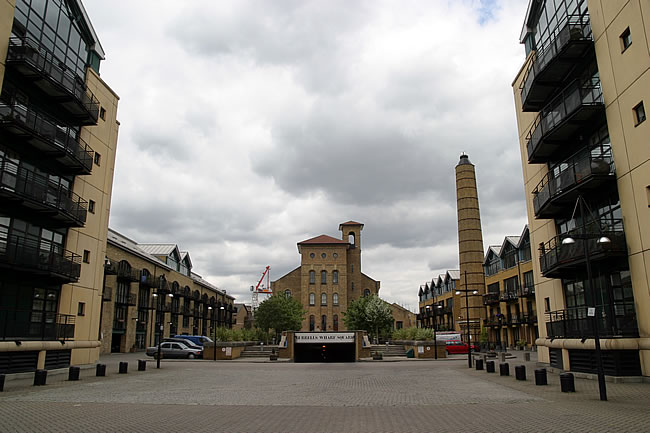
Burrells Wharf Square. Burrells Wharf is one of the popular developments in the Isle of Dogs, London, UK.

== History ==
For centuries all of Millwall and Cubitt Town was an occasionally flooded but fertile meadow land, supporting a small Middlesex fishing, watermen and farming community. By the 19th century Millwall Iron Works had been built on this land. From 1855 to 1858 Sir William Fairbairn built early iron ships here and undertook the model tests for the development of the box girder original Britannia Bridge which connected Anglesey until damaged by fire and replaced with a different type of tall bridge.

John Scott Russell bought the works and was instrumental in building here The SS Great Eastern, where it was launched. This was a steam and sail ship designed by engineer Isambard Kingdom Brunel, and the largest ship in the world for its time, when built in 1858. The ship may not have lasted long in its commercial use, but the shipyard and site where it was launched have fared better.

Some of the land developed in the 20th century into a pigment/dye factory, having immediate access to the various imports required in Poplar. According to local lore, the local bird-life would get into the factory buildings and become contaminated with the dyes: it was reputedly common to see pigeons in various unusual colours flying around the area. The factory relocated elsewhere in the late 1980s, with the decline of the Poplar docks as a functioning commercial port in favour of larger facilities for container ships.

In the late 1980s and early 1990s, Burrells was converted by Galliard Homes for residential use and consists of c. 400 apartments with central leisure facilities, and the addition of several newly built blocks.

== Architecture ==
Two structures in the Burrells Wharf estate are listed at Grade II:

- Plate House (1860) - The former water tower and surrounding building was once part of the Millwall Ironworks, which also included the Forge building on the other side of Westferry Road (also with a Grade II listing, but not forming part of the Burrells Wharf estate).
- Former Offices (1-37 Burrells Wharf Square) (1860) - This administration block served the former iron works and Burrell's Colours business in the latter 20th century. Inlaid with various depth brickwork, this three-storeyed stock brick block is arranged parallel to the above units, separated by Burrells Wharf Square where a construction dock once stood. Upper floors have glazing bar sash windows with flat-gauged arches and stucco sills.

== Burrells Wharf today ==
Burrells Wharf is owned and managed by Burrells Wharf Freeholds Ltd (BWFL), a company formed by and wholly composed of leaseholders of the estate. Currently some 80% of leaseholders have taken up a share in the freehold company. BWFL has a Board of Directors, all of whom are shareholders on the estate and act in a voluntary capacity; they have appointed managing agents whose role includes the management of all supply contracts; the collection of service charges; the placing of any contracts to meet the capital investment programme, and advice to the Directors of BWFL on the setting of budgets. BWFL also employ a team of staff for the day-to-day running of the estate, including a 24-hour concierge service through the Estate Office and management of contractors such as cleaners, plant and electrical maintenance, gardening, decorating and general estate management duties.

In addition to the amenity of its central square, where an annual communal barbecue is held, the estate has a leisure centre with a gym and swimming pool, and a Function Room open for residents and non-residents to book for a range of activities, such as yoga groups, mother and toddler groups, private parties and so on. A social committee organises various events through the year. There is a website and a Facebook group for residents to share comments and discussions, lost and found and items for sale, and the like.

== Local amenities ==
Masthouse Terrace Pier is located beside the estate as well as the Santander Cycles dock, “Napier Avenue, Millwall”. Within a short walk are Millwall Park and Mudchute Park and Farm, Island Gardens, and the foot tunnel to Greenwich. At 1 mile (1.6 km) north are the multiple shops and restaurants of Canary Wharf.

== See also ==
- Isle of Dogs
- Canary Wharf
- Masthouse Terrace Pier
- Mudchute
- Island Gardens
- SS Great Eastern
