= North Greenwich, Isle of Dogs =

Coordinates: 51.489°N 0.019°W

North Greenwich
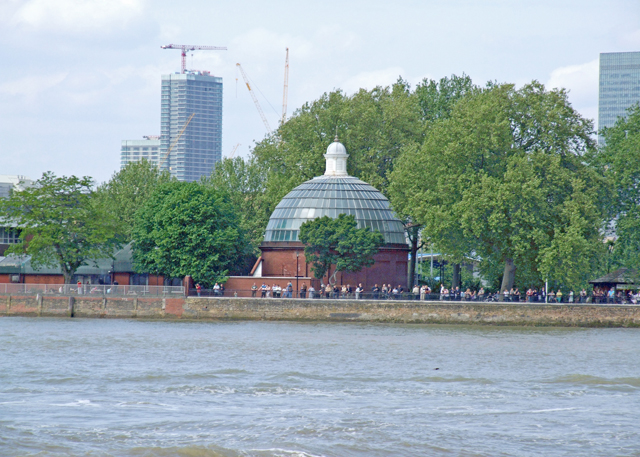
- View of North Greenwich from Greenwich

- Location within Greater London
- OS grid reference: TQ375785
- Ceremonial county: Greater London
- Region: London
- Country: England
- Sovereign state: United Kingdom
- Post town: LONDON
- Postcode district: E14, SE10
- Dialling code: 020
- Police: Metropolitan
- Fire: London
- Ambulance: London
- UK Parliament: Poplar and Limehouse

North Greenwich is a formal 19th century name for an area now in Millwall situated at the very southern tip of the Isle of Dogs, in the London Borough of Tower Hamlets. It lies to the south of the commercial estates of West India Docks including Canary Wharf and has a short shoreline along London's Tideway part of the River Thames.

It should not be confused with the Greenwich Peninsula formerly known as East Greenwich that lies south of the river and is the site of The O_{2} (formerly the Millennium Dome). The opening in 1999 of the North Greenwich tube station on London Underground's Jubilee line has now led to this area being unofficially known colloquially as North Greenwich.

== History ==
The area takes its name from Greenwich but was never a part of it, and was created for the now defunct North Greenwich railway station (1872) in the then Metropolitan Borough of Poplar, that served a former passenger ferry to Greenwich which the name became used to refer to the modern area. The station stood near the later Island Gardens (1897) and Greenwich foot tunnel (1902).

It faces Greenwich town centre over the River Thames and the area is now more usually known as South Millwall. Millwall Football Club played in this area from 1901 to 1910, naming their ground North Greenwich.

== Amenities ==
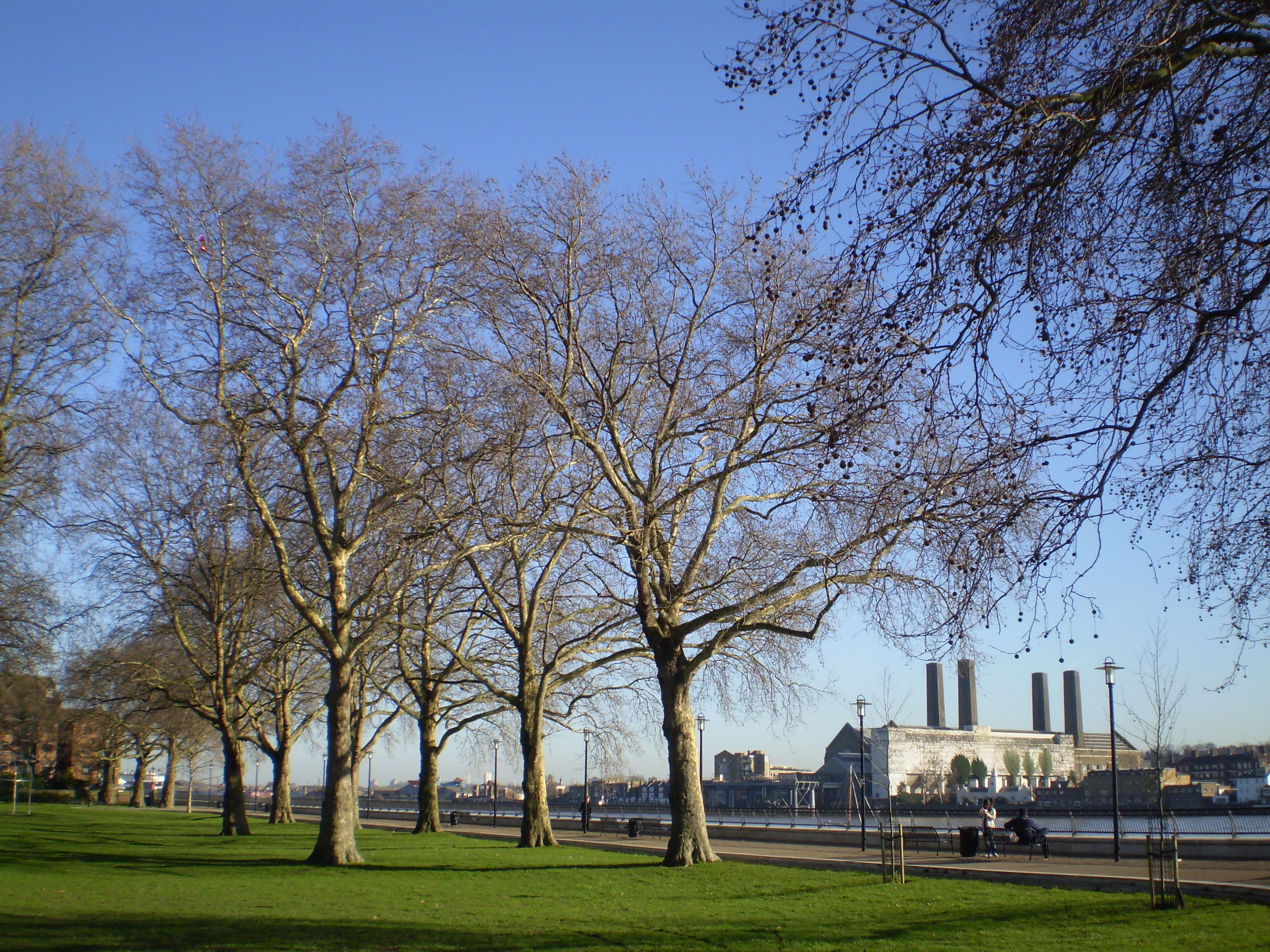
Island Gardens (New Years Day, January 2008)

The historical Island Gardens, opened on 3 August 1895 by local politician Will Crooks, is located almost in front of the former Greenwich Hospital, the Cutty Sark, National Maritime Museum and Greenwich Park.

=== Landmarks ===
The Ferry House is a pub on Ferry Street has existed since the Tudor period (1485-1603). The present building dates from 1822, and was used as a drinking establishment by ferry passengers to and from Greenwich until the opening of the Greenwich foot tunnel in 1902.

== Education ==
- George Green's School (actually in Cubitt Town but on the western and southern boundary with North Greenwich)

== Transport ==
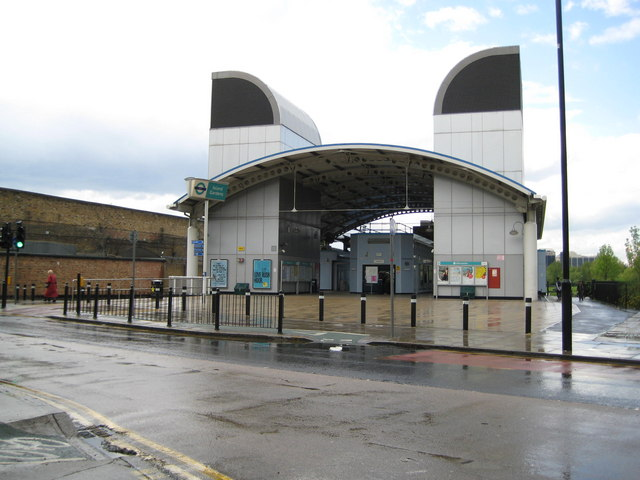
Island Gardens DLR station with the disused Millwall Extension Railway beside it.

North Greenwich shares a Docklands Light Railway station with Cubitt Town called Island Gardens on the Bank-Lewisham line.

Several London Buses routes call in the area, 135 and D7, N550 run on Manchester Road and 277 on East Ferry Road.

The Greenwich foot tunnel crosses beneath the River Thames, opened on the 4 August 1902 and it original purpose was to allow south London residents to work on the Isle of Dogs without having to make a large detour. It connects North Greenwich to Greenwich town centre.

== Sport ==
Blackwall and District Rowing Club was formed in 1845 and is one of the oldest rowing clubs in the United Kingdom. A Tideway rowing club, historically it known as the Poplar, Blackwall and District Rowing Club. It competes in leading national races, runs Poplar regatta (wind permitting), and is the end of the Great River Race. Its members hold old records in the Doggett's Coat and Badge race for single sculls on the Thames. Its most notable member is Olympic gold and silver medallist, and double-World Champion Mark Hunter.

North Greenwich football ground in East Ferry Road was home to Millwall Athletic Football Club, today Millwall F.C., from 1901 to 1910.

== Nearby places ==
- Millwall
- Cubitt Town

== See also ==
- North Woolwich
- Greenwich
