= Barkantine Estate =

Housing estate in Millwall, London

Coordinates: 51.498°N 0.025°W

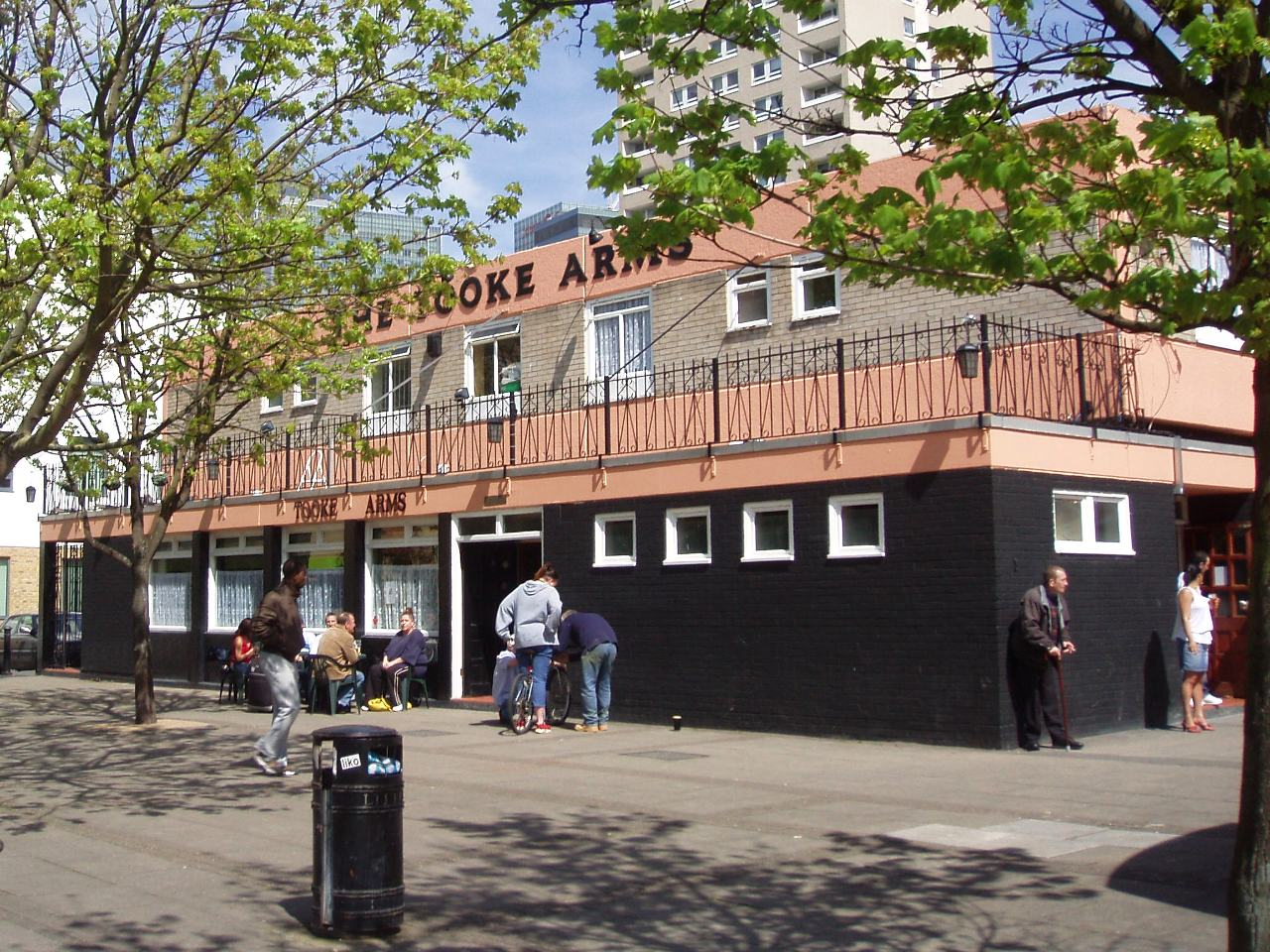
The Tooke Arms, a pub on the Barkantine Estate, rebuilt in the 1970s

The Barkantine Estate is a large social housing estate in Millwall built by the London County Council in the late 1960s, located on the Isle of Dogs and is also composed of a pub, shopping promenade and park.

== History ==
The decision to proceed with the development was made in March 1965, with first block being opened in 1968.

The estate originally consisted of 634 dwellings.

Funds were spent by the London Docklands Development Corporation to refurbish some of the buildings, adding facades and improving the appearance of walkways in 1984.

The 1996 Docklands bombing caused serious damage to parts of the Barkantine Estate. This led to the demolishing of Lantern House, and building 40 low-rise flats in their place.

== The Quarterdeck ==
The Quarterdeck is a pedestrianized uncovered promenade and park within the Barkantine Estate and serves as the district centre of Millwall, it includes a number of shops and services as well as a pub called the Tooke Arms. It is known in council planning as the Quarterdeck Shopping Centre.
