= A1206 road (Great Britain) =

Road around the Isle of Dogs, in the east of London, England

Coordinates: 51°29′14″N 00°00′48″W

A1206
- Isle of Dogs Distributor Road
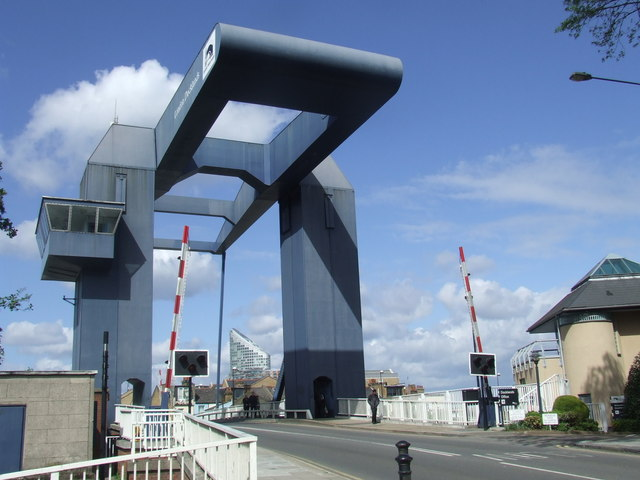
- Blue Bridge at the West India Docks entrance

Major junctions
- North end: Poplar
- South end: Poplar

Location
- Country: United Kingdom
- Primary destinations: Isle of Dogs, Canary Wharf, Cubitt Town

Road network
- Roads in the United Kingdom; Motorways; A and B road zones

The A1206, also known as the Isle of Dogs Distributor Road, is a crescent-shaped ring road around the Isle of Dogs, in the London Borough of Tower Hamlets. It is made up of Westferry Road, Manchester Road and Prestons Road and is the main road through the area, connecting parts of Tower Hamlets.

== Route ==
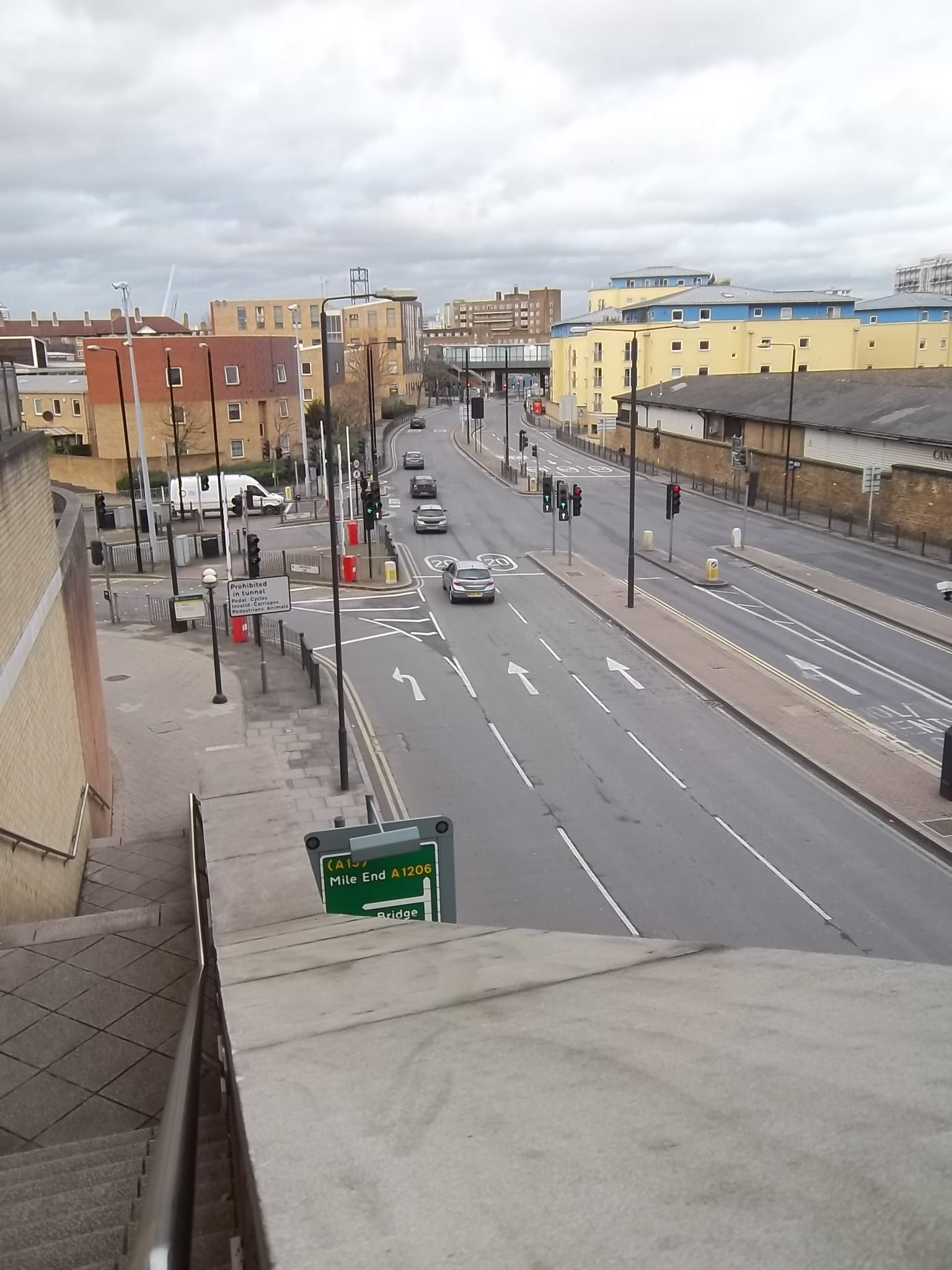
View north of Westferry Circus

From west to east, the road starts in Poplar, then changes from Westferry Road to Manchester Road at Island Gardens. At Cubitt Town it crosses the entrance to the West India Docks via the Blue Bridge, a bascule bridge that allows ships to reach the docks. It then becomes Prestons Road, ending in Poplar. Several side roads and buildings along Westferry Road, such as Cuba Street and Spinnaker House, have names related to the historic connection the Isle of Dogs has with the shipping industry.

== History ==
At the start of the 19th century, Westferry Road was called the Deptford and Greenwich Ferry Road. It began to be built up as the parish of Poplar developed. The first bridge over the West India Dock entrance opened concurrently with the docks in 1805. The current bridge is the sixth iteration and opened in 1969.

St Paul's Presbyterian Church was on Westferry Road, opening in 1859. It escaped demolition in the 1980s and was converted into an arts centre. Millwall Fire Station was at No. 461 Westferry Road and opened in 1877. It was replaced by a later building in 1905.

The road was originally classified as the A1206 only as far as the bridge over the entrance to Millwall Docks. The local area was transformed after the deterioration and closure of the docks and the development of areas such as the Canary Wharf financial estate in the 1980s. To the west, Westferry Circus opened in 1991 as the main traffic entrance for Canary Wharf. The Westferry Printing Works opened off Westferry Road to the north of Millwall Dock in 1984, and subsequently became one of the largest print works in Europe.

== Traffic ==
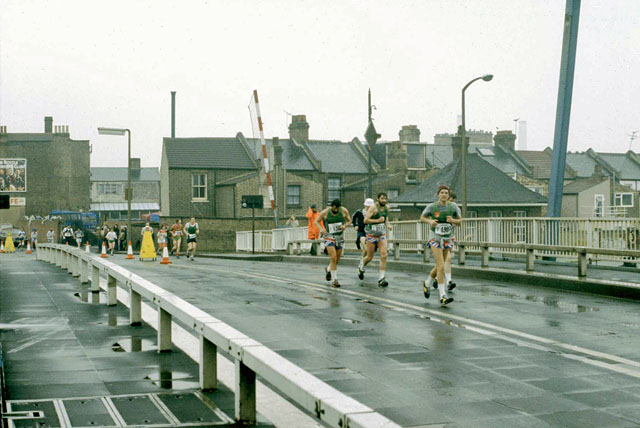
London Marathon runners on the A1206 in 1982

Because the A1206 is the main road through the Isle of Dogs, incidents on it can cause serious congestion in the surrounding area. The proposed Silvertown Tunnel should help alleviate this. The occasional closures of Blue Bridge to vehicular traffic (to allow ships to reach the docks) create queues in both directions.
