= London Buses route 135 =

London bus route

135
- Lea Interchange Bus Company Wright Gemini 3 bodied Volvo B5LH in Aldgate in April 2023

Overview
- Operator: Lea Interchange Bus Company (Stagecoach London)
- Garage: Lea Interchange
- Vehicle: Volvo B5LH Wright Gemini 3
- Peak vehicle requirement: 15
- Began service: 24 May 2008
- Former operators: Tower Transit; Docklands Buses; Arriva London
- Night-time: No night service

Route
- Start: Cubitt Town
- Via: Canary Wharf; Limehouse; Aldgate
- End: Moorfields Eye Hospital
- Length: 8 miles (13 km)

Service
- Level: Daily
- Frequency: About every 10-15 minutes
- Journey time: 37-80 minutes
- Operates: 04:20 until 01:30

London Buses route 135 is a Transport for London contracted bus route in London, England. Running between Cubitt Town and Moorfields Eye Hospital, it is operated by Stagecoach London subsidiary Lea Interchange Bus Company.

== History ==
Arriva London Alexander Dennis Enviro400

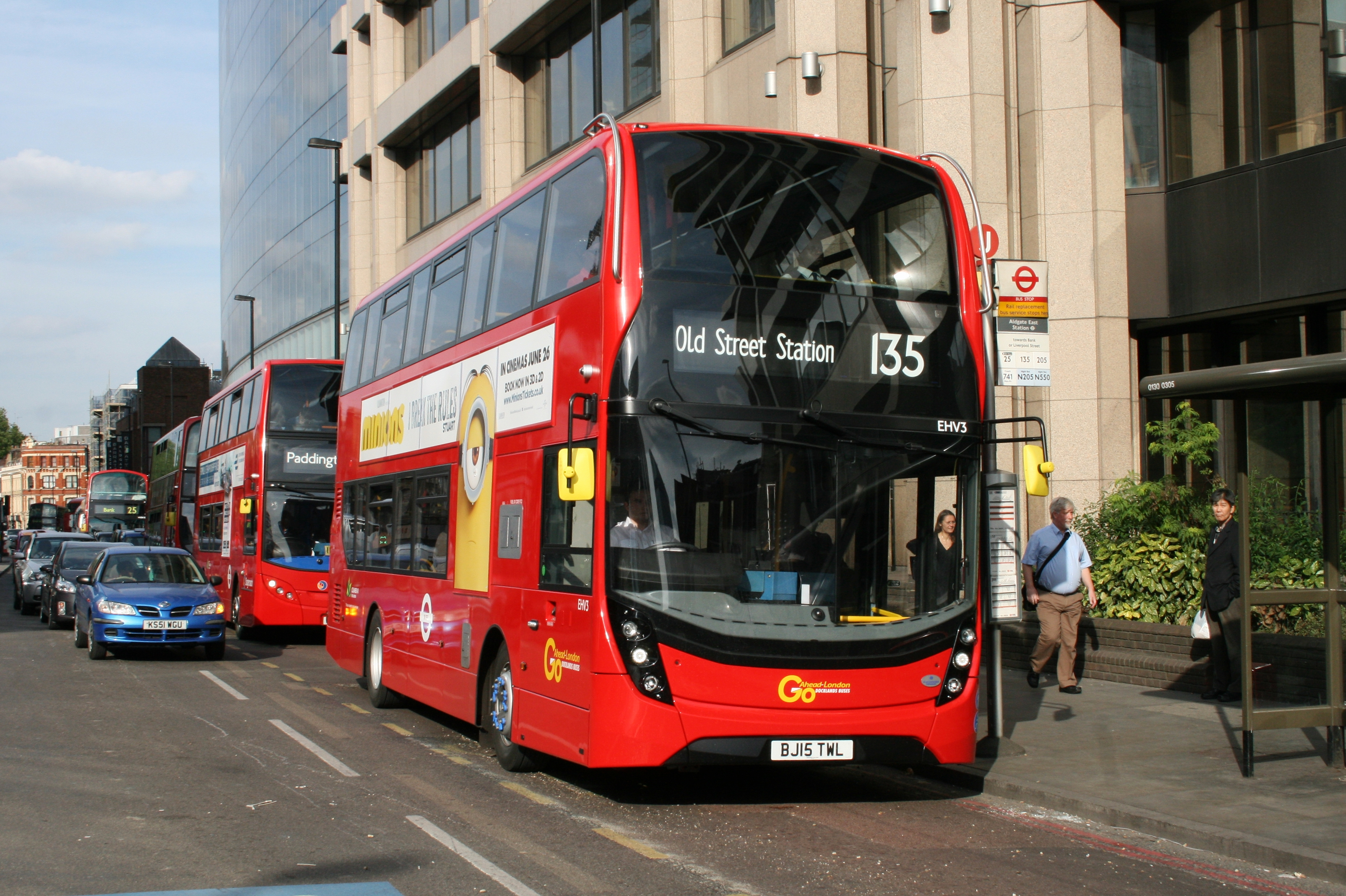
Docklands Buses Volvo B5LH Alexander Dennis Enviro400 MMC at Aldgate East station in June 2015

Route 135 commenced operating on 24 May 2008 between Cubitt Town and Moorfields Eye Hospital. It was initially operated at a frequency of every 15 minutes off-peak and every 10 minutes during peak hours, with a maximum requirement of 13 double-deck buses. The initial contract to operate the route was awarded to Arriva London's Barking garage. The route was featured in Time Out magazine in 2009.

Upon being re-tendered, the route was awarded to Docklands Buses with the transfer occurring on 23 May 2015 and Alexander Dennis Enviro400H MMC bodied Volvo B5LHs introduced.

On 17 September 2016, it was rerouted through the Isle of Dogs to partly replace route D3.

Upon being retendered, operation the route was taken over by Tower Transit's Lea Interchange bus garage on 21 May 2022 using Wright Gemini 3 bodied Volvo B5LHs formerly used on route 328. The route was included in the sale of Lea Interchange bus garage to Stagecoach London's new subsidiary Lea Interchange Bus Company on 25 June 2022.

== Current route ==
Route 135 operates via these primary locations:

- Cubitt Town Asda
- Crossharbour station
- Island Gardens station
- Mudchute station
- Millwall
- Canary Wharf station
- Canary Wharf Westferry Circus
- Westferry station
- Limehouse station
- Shadwell
- Aldgate East station
- Liverpool Street station
- Shoreditch High Street station
- Old Street station
- Moorfields Eye Hospital

== Previous route 135 ==
The route number 135 has previously been used twice; for a service between Forty Hill and Brimsdown, until September 1982, and from November 1987 for a service between Marble Arch and Archway via Camden Town. The second service was operated by Metroline after privatisation, and was withdrawn in December 2000, being replaced by extending route 88 to cover part of its route and increasing the frequency of route 134, which already ran over much of the 135 route.
