= Mudchute Park and Farm =

Park on the Isle of Dogs, London

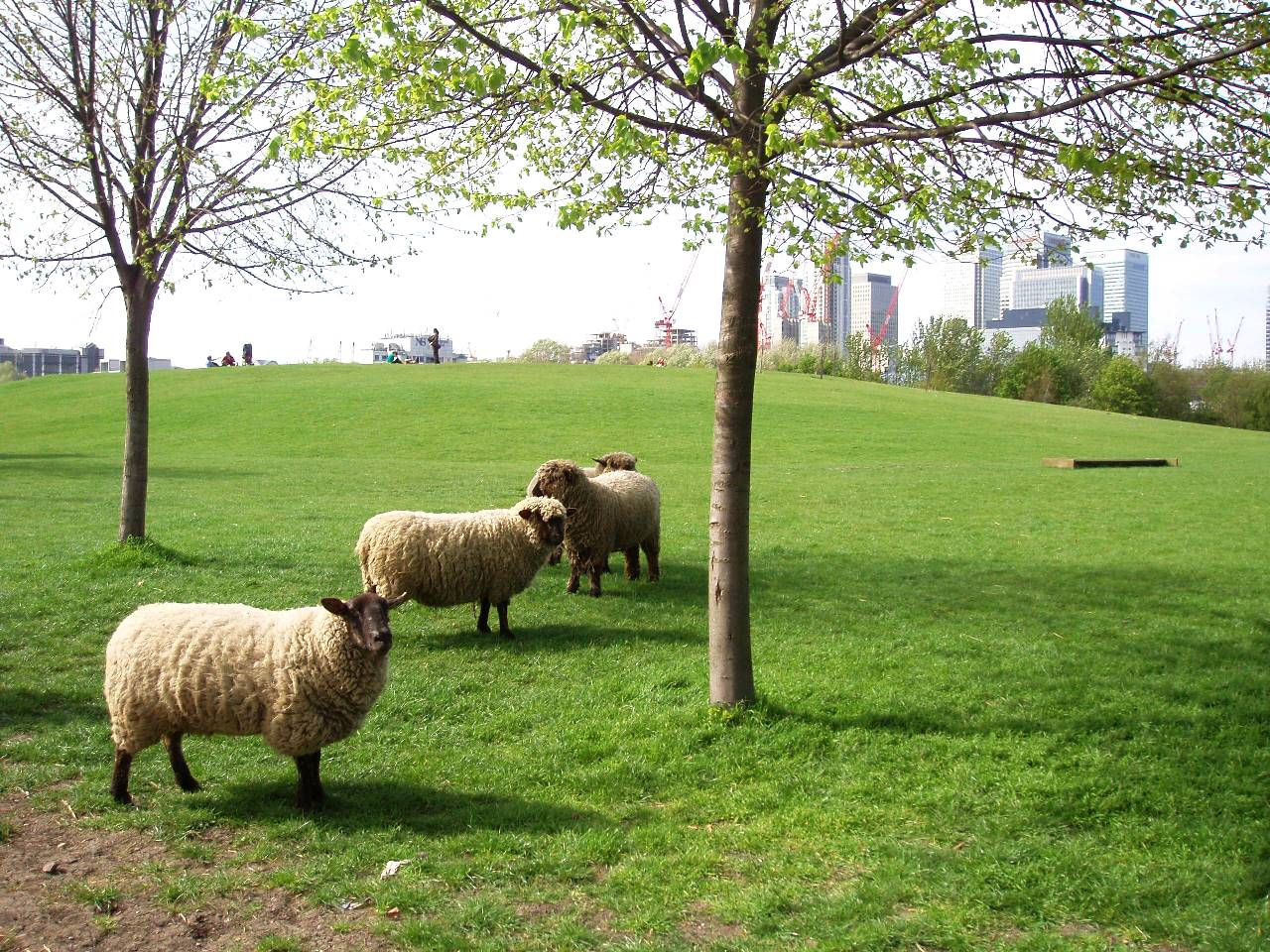
- Sheep in a field on the farm, with Canary Wharf visible behind

- Location within Greater London
- Type: City farm
- Location: Isle of Dogs, London
- Coordinates: 51°29′32″N 0°0′44″W
- Open: Daily
- Website: https://www.mudchute.org

Mudchute Park and Farm is a large urban park and city farm located in East London, in Cubitt Town on the Isle of Dogs. It is a local nature reserve and a Site of Metropolitan Importance for Nature Conservation.

The name of the site is a testament to the engineering overspill when Millwall Dock was being constructed in the 1860s. Spoil from the excavation of the dock, and silt from its channels and waterways were dumped on nearby land, using a conveyor system.

== Facilities ==
The Mudchute Association, is a registered charity whose primary objective is "Management of the park and farm with special consideration for animals, wildlife, visitors, trainees & staff. To maintain the financial sustainability of the project and to respond to local needs and initiatives."

The park now covers 13 hectares (32 acres), and the local authority describes the farm as the largest urban farm in Europe.

Mudchute DLR station, named after the park, opened in 1987. However, the park recommends using Crossharbour station.

=== Gallery ===
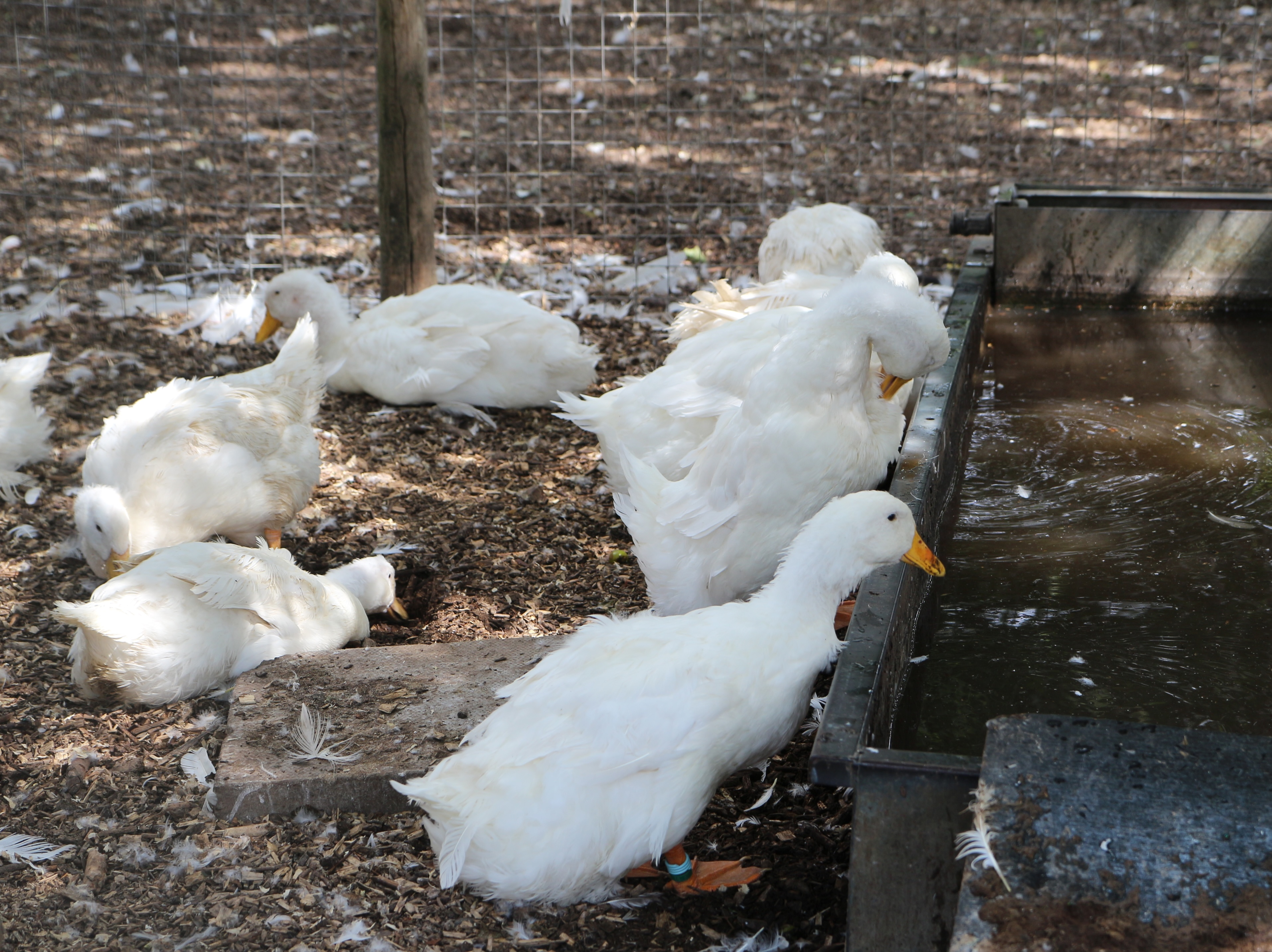
Ducks

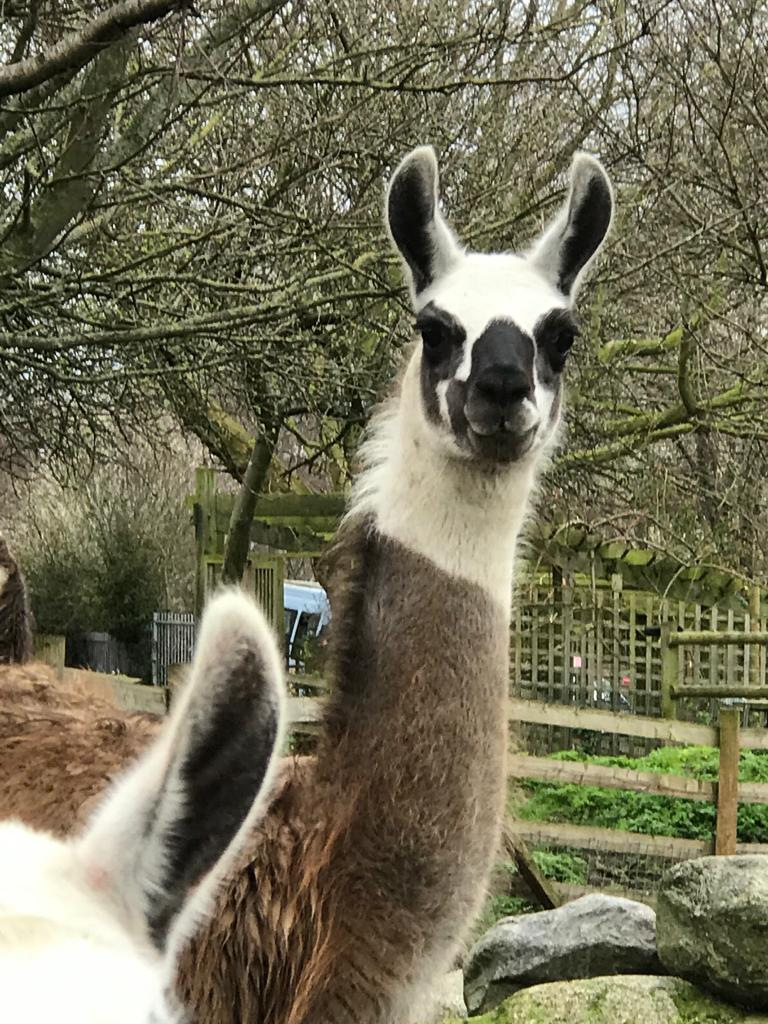
Llama

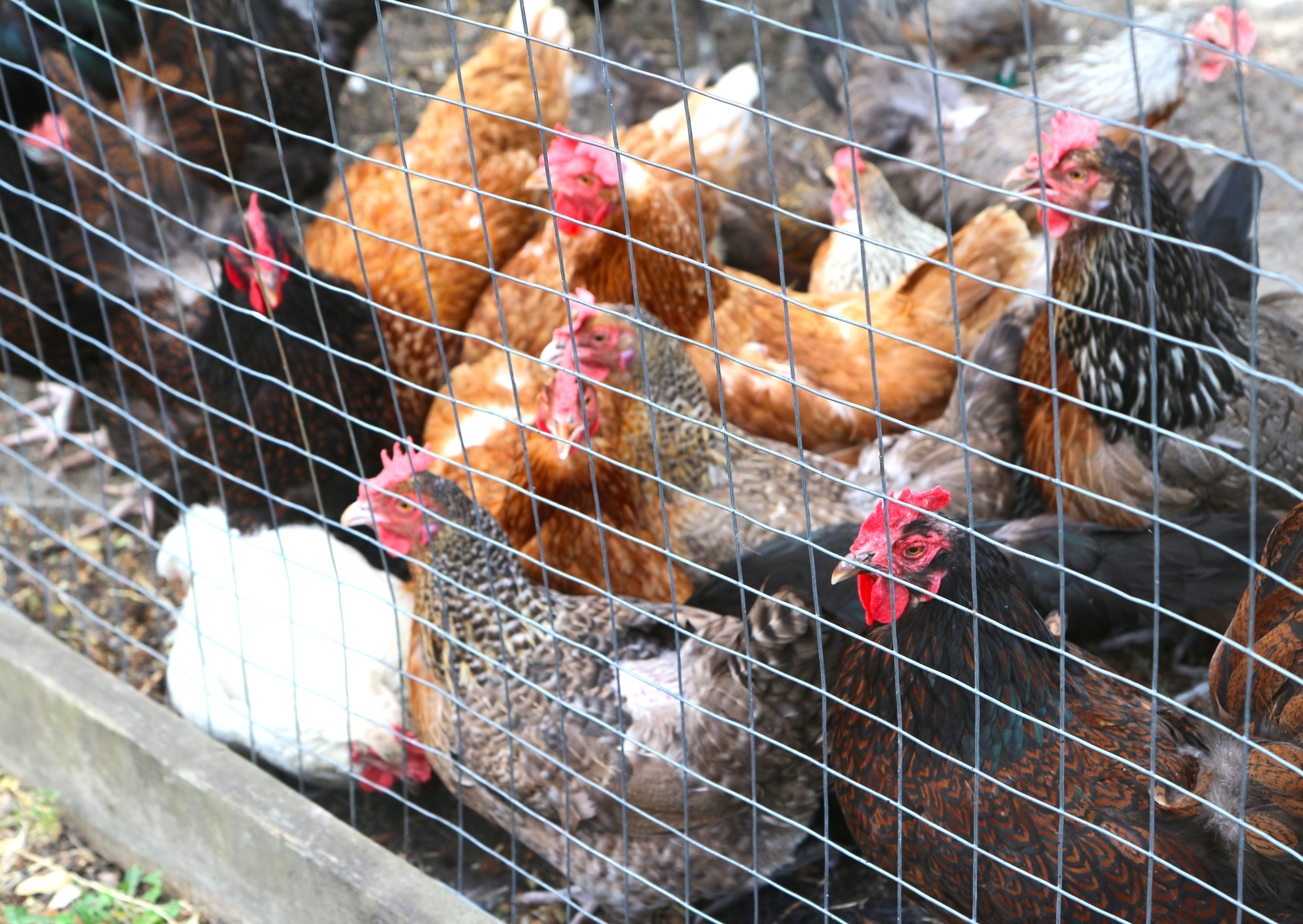
Chickens

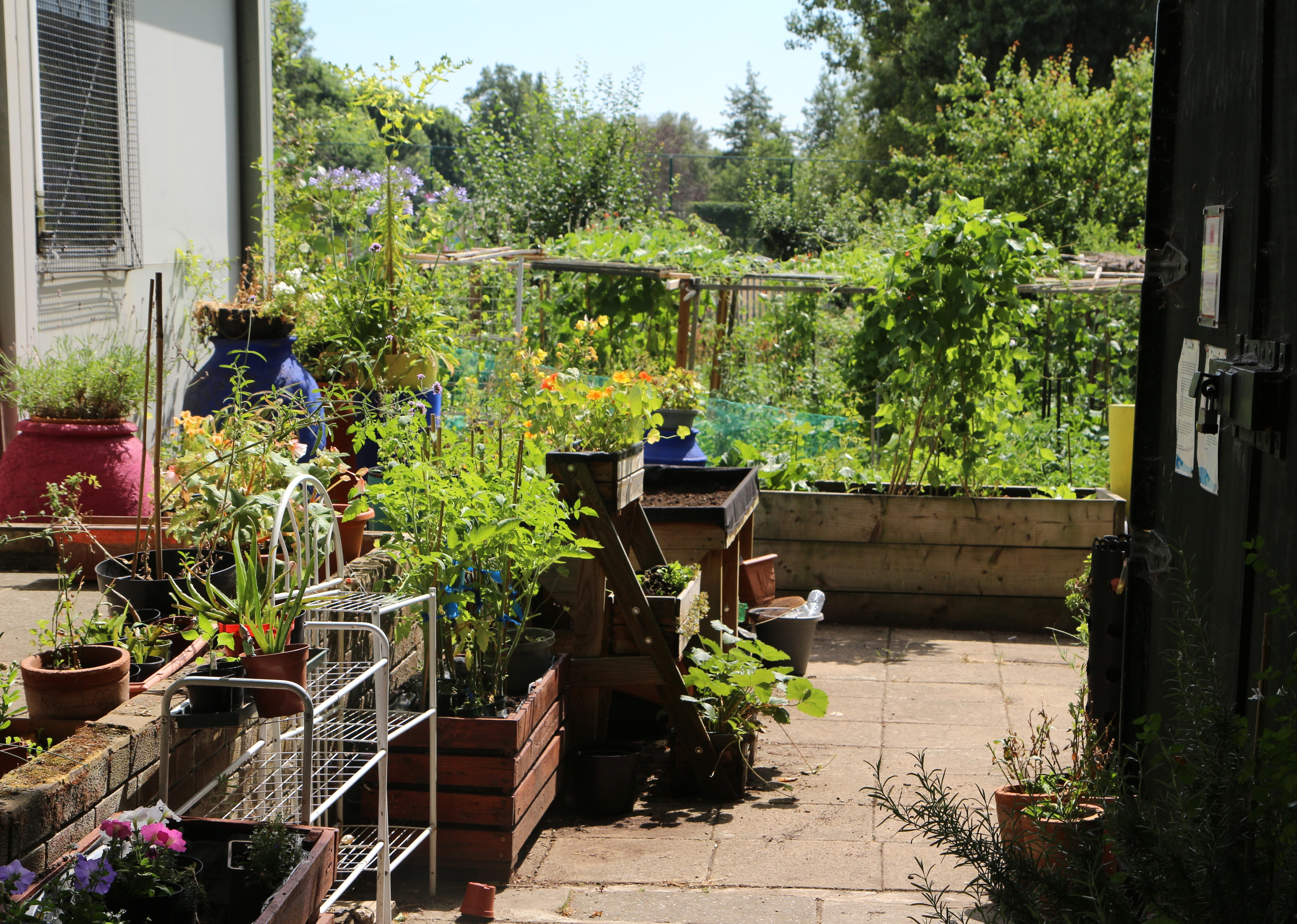
Martyn Daniels Community Garden

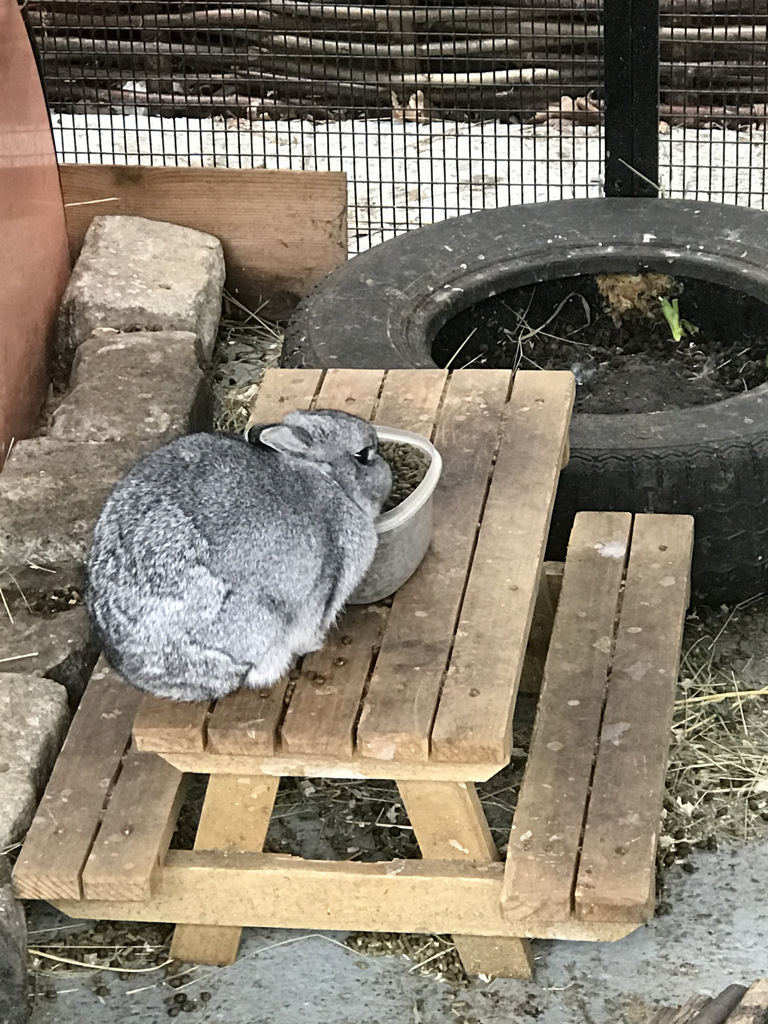
Rabbit

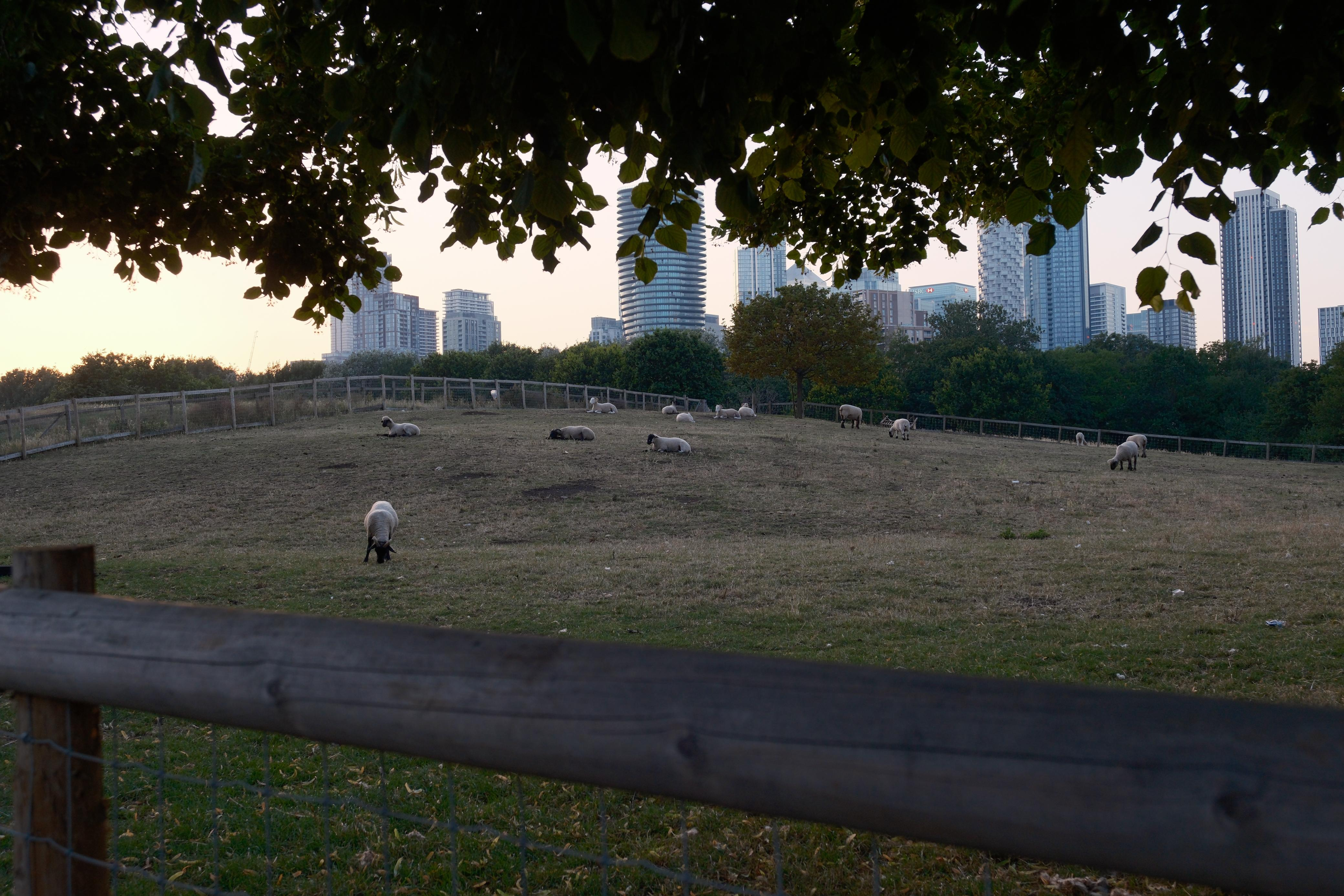
Sheep

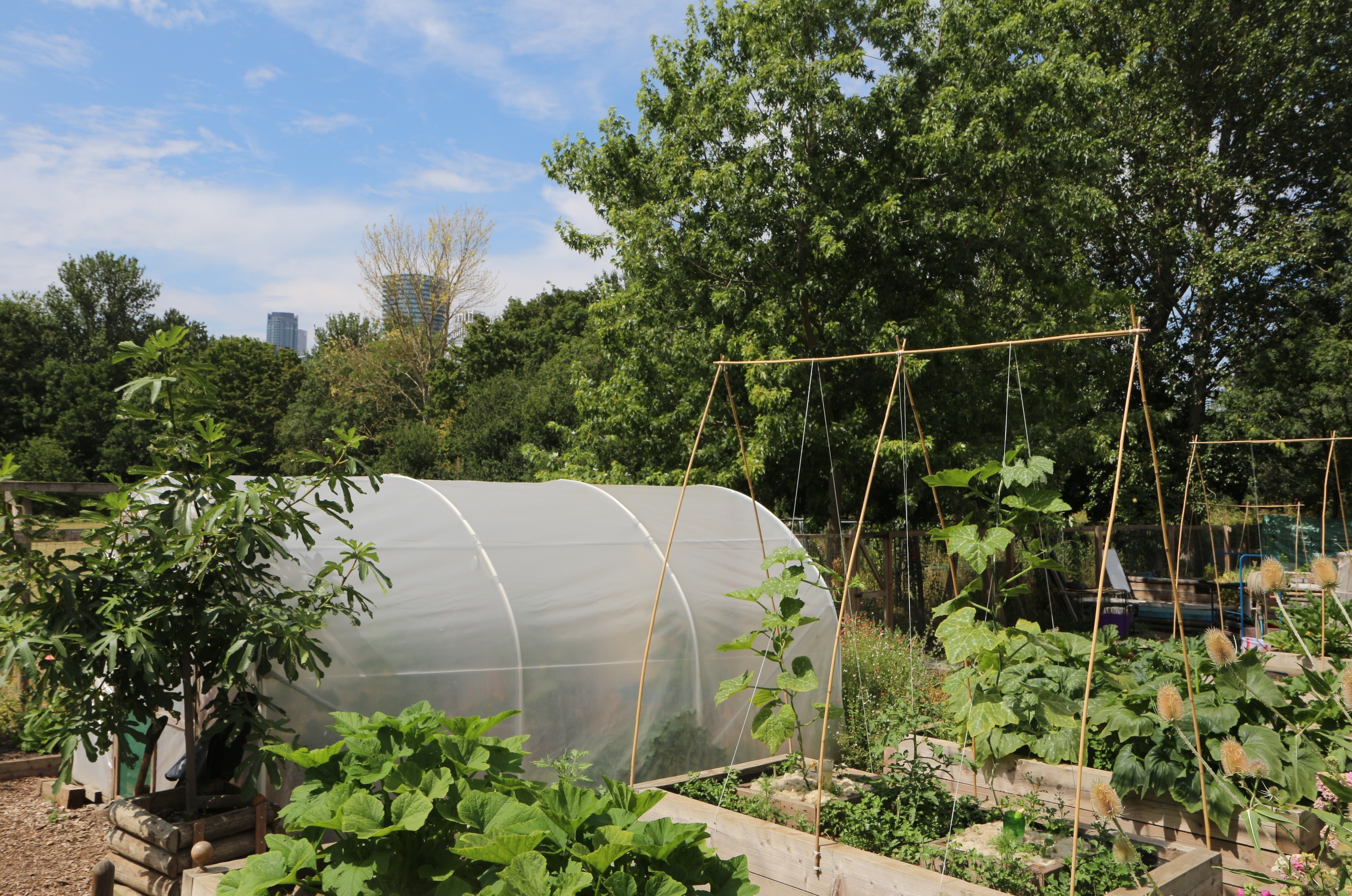
Community food garden

== History ==
In the 19th century the Millwall Freehold Land and Dock Company owned a huge swathe of land across the Isle of Dogs, as it intended to extend the docks to meet the Thames in the east one day, when there was enough business to justify it. Until then, the company kept the land undeveloped, mostly leasing it out for pasture. This was also the case for the later Mudchute (or 'Mud Shoot' as it was originally spelled in official documents).

The name "Mudchute" derives from it being the former dumping ground for mud dredged from the Millwall Docks, which had to be regularly dredged to prevent silting up. A novel, pneumatic device was employed which pumped the liquefied mud through a pipe over East Ferry Road (close to the George pub), dumping it on the other side. This system was designed by dock engineer Frederic Eliot Duckham (father of Alexander Duckham who later founded his eponymous lubricating oil company in Millwall).

The mud stank terribly, and Poplar Borough Council continually complained to the dock company that it was causing disease (including diphtheria) among locals, and tried unsuccessfully to have the mud dumping stopped. (Later, Mudchute allotment holders who built wells to provide water to their plants complained about its condition, but it was some decades before the council pumped clean water to the Mudchute allotments.)

By 1890, the Millwall Dock Company had not yet dumped mud on the northern edge of its land east of East Ferry Road, which meant the ground was flat and solid. The landlord of the nearby George pub, William Clark, leased a 400 ft by 420 ft (120 m × 130 m) plot on the flat land, planning to develop an athletics stadium for football, cricket and tennis, with running and cycling tracks. The stadium was opened in June 1890, and became the first home of Millwall Athletic football team. A supermarket was later built on the site. The smell remained, though, and Corinthians player and England international Fred Pelly later declared that he did not mind playing on the ground, but he objected falling down on it because "the smell wouldn't come off for weeks".

In 1901, the dock company decided that it wanted its land back, in order to use it for timber storage. It had plans to install a large timber transporter, which would carry off-loaded timber from the docks to warehouses on the ground where the stadium was located, which would become known as the Transporter Yard. Millwall Athletic football club was forced to find its fourth ground on the island: they moved to an area of land that would later be known as Millwall Park.

=== 1940s onwards ===
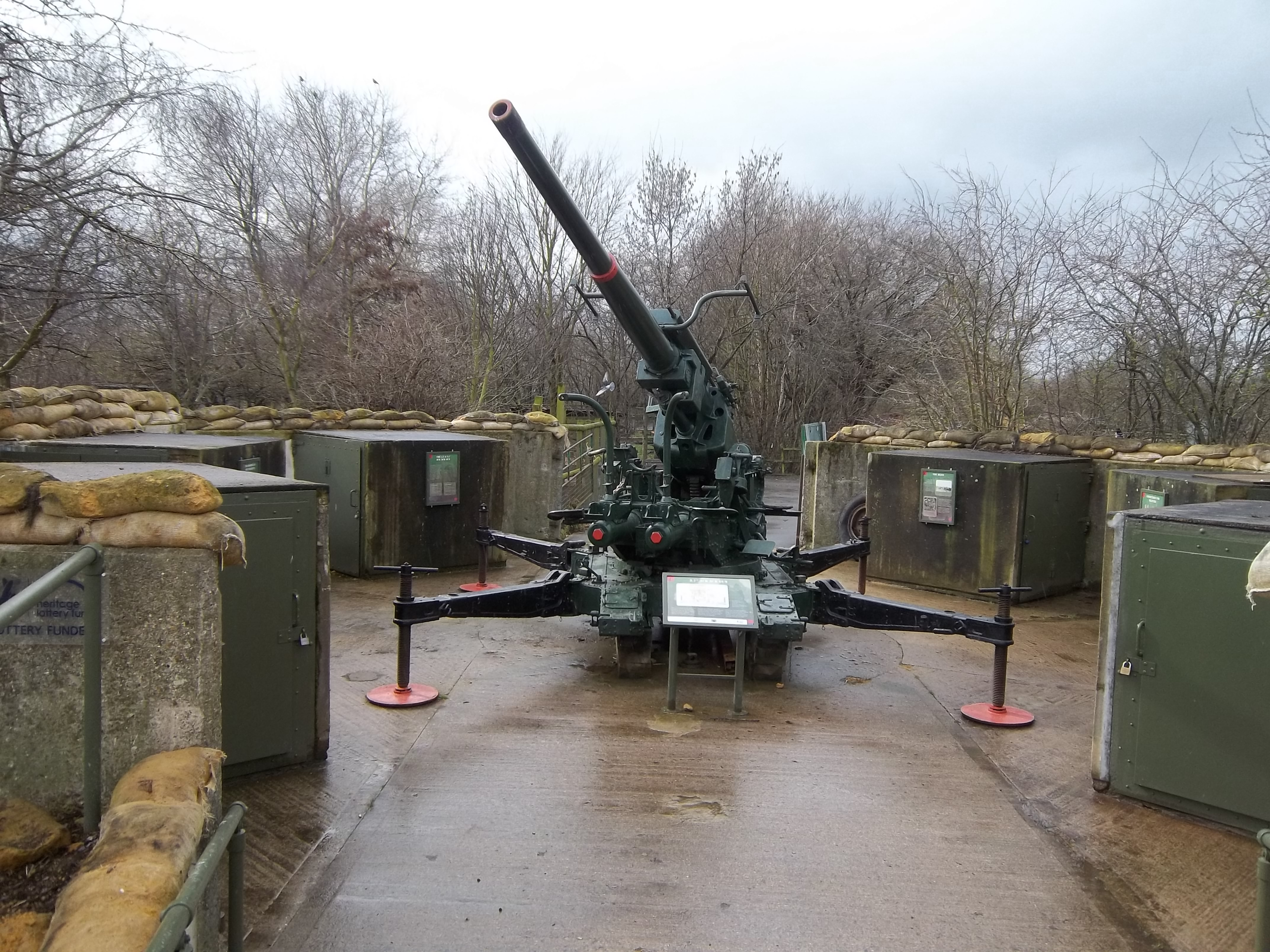
A decommissioned QF 3.7-inch anti-aircraft gun on display at the farm

During World War II the Transporter Yard served as an RAF embarkation point, and a section of the higher land was the site for four Ack Ack anti-aircraft guns. The 154 Battery of the 52 Heavy Anti-Aircraft Regiment, Royal Artillery was stationed at the Mudchute until 26 March 1941. Then the 119 Heavy Anti-Aircraft Regiment manned the site until 1945. The guns were fired by remote control using radar to track enemy aeroplanes. The Blitz started on 7 September 1940, and on 8 September the guardroom, canteen, and stores was destroyed by bombs, but there were no casualties. During the Blitz, 430 people were killed on the Isle of Dogs.

After the war, the Mudchute remained owned by the Port of London Authority (PLA), and was patrolled by PLA Police, but it was used for diverse purposes: a PLA Sports Club football pitch near the Pier St entrance, a huge commercial cattle shed on the site of the later farm buildings, allotments and a large playground for all the children of the Isle communities.

In the early 1970s, the PLA realised that the Millwall Docks would close in the foreseeable future, and they negotiated with the Greater London Council to transfer Mudchute land to them for housing purposes. However, the Association of Island Communities launched a successful campaign to make the land a public, open space. A newly-formed Mudchute Association leased the land, except for the land leased to ASDA for one of their supermarkets from Tower Hamlets Borough Council. A farm and garden was established in 1977.
