= Island Gardens DLR station =

Docklands Light Railway station

Island Gardens
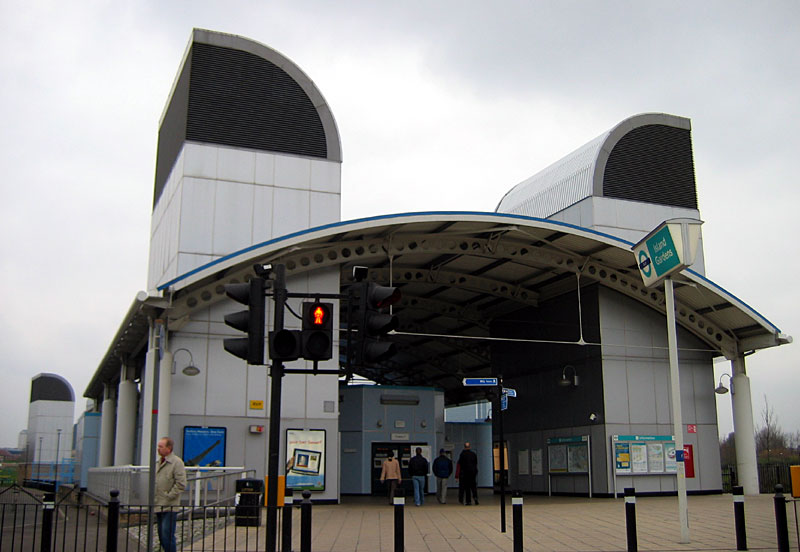
- Station entrance

General information
- Location: Island Gardens, Tower Hamlets
- Coordinates: 51.4881°N 0.0104°W
- Owned by: Transport for London
- Managed by: Docklands Light Railway
- Platforms: 2

Construction
- Structure type: Underground
- Accessible: Yes

Other information
- Fare zone: 2
- Website: Edit this at Wikidata

History
- Opened: 31 August 1987

Key dates
- 9 March 1992: Closed temporarily
- 5 April 1992: Reopened
- 8 January 1999: Original station closed permanently
- 20 November 1999: New station on Lewisham extension opened

Passengers

DLR annual entry and exit
- 2020: ▼1.329 million
- 2021: ▲1.514 million
- 2022: ▲2.190 million
- 2023: ▲2.360 million
- 2024: ▼2.21 million
Location
- Location in Tower Hamlets

Island Gardens is a Docklands Light Railway (DLR) station next to Island Gardens on the Isle of Dogs, East London. It is just north of the River Thames and is close to the southern tip of the Isle of Dogs and the River Thames.

Island Gardens is a public park with a notable view across the river to the classical buildings of the former Greenwich Hospital and the National Maritime Museum, with Greenwich Park forming a backdrop. The northern entrance of the Greenwich foot tunnel is within the park.

== History ==
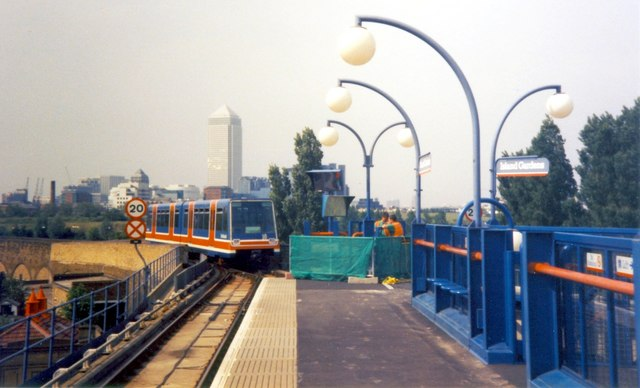
Island Gardens DLR station before being rebuilt

The original Island Gardens DLR station was opened on 31 August 1987 as the southern terminus of the initial system. It was built adjacent to the site of the old North Greenwich railway station, which had been the southern terminus of the former Millwall Extension Railway, which had closed to passengers in 1926. The new station was elevated with two platforms, each capable of accommodating a single-car train. The design incorporated false arches to match the existing single-track viaduct. The station required significant rebuilding to allow the platforms to take two-car trains.

=== Pre-opening incident ===
On 10 March 1987, before the system opened, a test train crashed through buffer stops at the original high-level terminus and was left hanging from the end of the elevated track. The accident was widely reported to have been caused by unauthorised tests being run before the correct installation of the wayside safety system had been verified; an omission in the wayside system allowed the train to travel too fast on the approach to the terminus. The train was being driven manually at the time. However, inside sources have said that the team was testing the to see if the ATP would stop the train if it was being driven in too fast. The first six tests ran successfully, but on the seventh, a software issue involving asynchronous computer systems caused the train to not receive the instructions to activate the ATP, cut off power from the motors, and apply the brakes soon enough to prevent the train from slowing down, causing the train to go through the buffers. Following this, the software was reworked and the braking distance was changed to ensure such incidents wouldn't happen in practice, and as a result may have possibly prevented a far more tragic incident from occurring.

=== Extension to Lewisham ===
In the mid 1990s, construction began to extend the DLR south by 4.2 kilometres (3 mi) to Lewisham. As the line would pass under the River Thames in deep tube tunnel, a new station would have to be built slightly further away from the river, north of Manchester Road, and underground. The new station and tunnel to Mudchute was built using the cut and cover method, with Millwall Park reinstated on top of the tunnel. In January 1999, the original Island Gardens station was closed, to allow construction of the connection to the extension to continue.

Island Gardens station reopened in November 1999 as part of the opening of the DLR extension to Lewisham. As with other stations on the extension, the station was designed by consultant W S Atkins. Ducts for the tunnel ventilation system are integrated into the architecture of the station.

The original 1987 station and the southern end of the connecting viaduct were subsequently demolished.

== Station layout ==
One of only four completely underground stations on the DLR network, Island Gardens station has an island platform with a track each side of it. Located just below the surface, the platform is accessed by stairs, with a lift making the station accessible.

== Connections ==
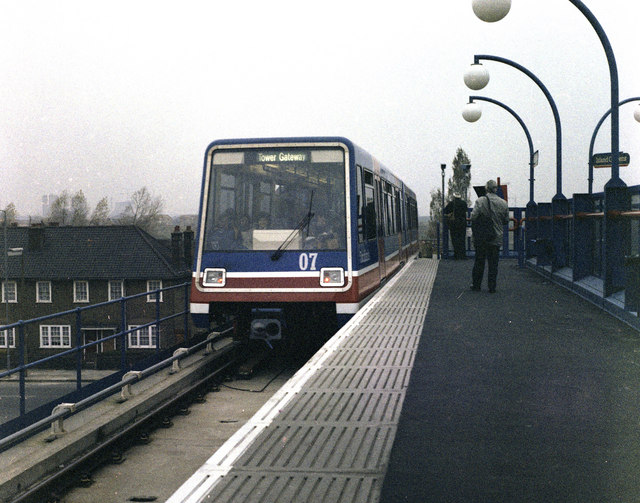
Island Gardens in 1987

London Buses routes 135, the D prefix route D7 and night route N550 serve the station.

== Services ==
The typical off-peak service in trains per hour from Island Gardens is:

- 12 tph to Bank
- 12 tph to Lewisham

Additional services call at the station during the peak hours, increasing the service to up to 22 tph in each direction, with up to 8 tph during the peak hours running to and from Stratford instead of Bank.

Preceding station	DLR	Following station
Mudchute towards Bank or Stratford	Docklands Light Railway	Cutty Sark for Maritime Greenwich towards Lewisham
