= Mudchute DLR station =

Docklands Light Railway station

Mudchute
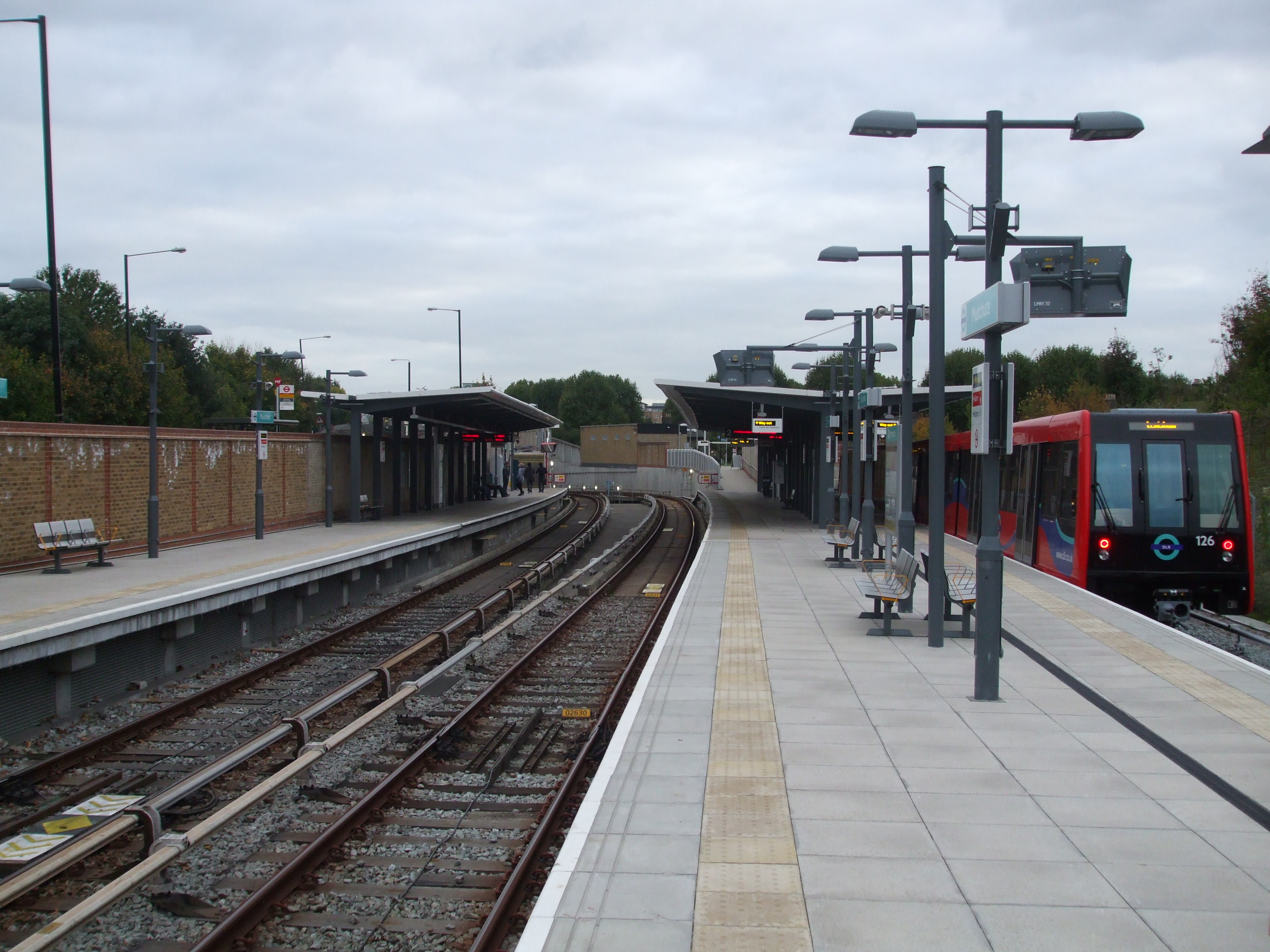
- Looking south at the platforms

General information
- Location: Isle of Dogs, Tower Hamlets
- Coordinates: 51.4912°N 0.0150°W
- Owner: Transport for London
- Manager: Docklands Light Railway
- Platforms: 3

Construction
- Structure type: Ground-level
- Accessible: Yes

Other information
- Status: Unstaffed
- Fare zone: 2
- Website: Official website

History
- Opened: 31 August 1987

Key dates
- 9 March 1992: Closed temporarily
- 5 April 1992: Reopened
- 20 November 1999: Rebuilt and resited
- 2009: Third platform added

Passengers

DLR annual entry and exit
- 2021: ▲1.142 million
- 2022: ▲1.560 million
- 2023: ▲1.760 million
- 2024: ▼1.60 million
- 2025: ▼1.55 million
Location
- Location in Tower Hamlets

Mudchute is a Docklands Light Railway (DLR) station on the Isle of Dogs, in the London Borough of Tower Hamlets in London, England. The station, which takes its name from the adjacent Mudchute Park and Farm, is situated in London fare zone 2.

== History ==
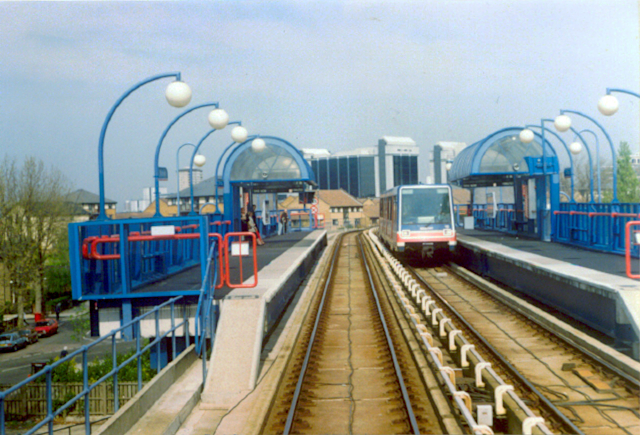
The original high-level Mudchute station in 1989

The original station was on the route of the Millwall Extension Railway which was an old Victorian railway line that had been disused for many years. The original elevated station opened on 31 August 1987 and it was the last station before the terminus at Island Gardens. When the line was extended under the River Thames to Lewisham the station was rebuilt in a shallow cutting close to the tunnel entrance. The rebuilt station opened on 20 November 1999. In April 2008 work started on replacing the siding formed by the old route into a third platform for reversing trains and adding a canopy over the station. By October 2009 these works were complete.

== Services ==
The typical off-peak service in trains per hour from Mudchute is:

- 12 tph to Bank
- 12 tph to Lewisham

Additional services call at the station during the peak hours, increasing the service to up to 22 tph in each direction, with up to 8 tph during the peak hours running to and from Stratford instead of Bank.

Preceding station	DLR	Following station
Crossharbour towards Bank or Stratford	Docklands Light Railway	Island Gardens towards Lewisham

== Connections ==
London Buses routes 135, 277 and night route N277 serve the station.
