= Masthouse Terrace Pier =

Pier on the River Thames

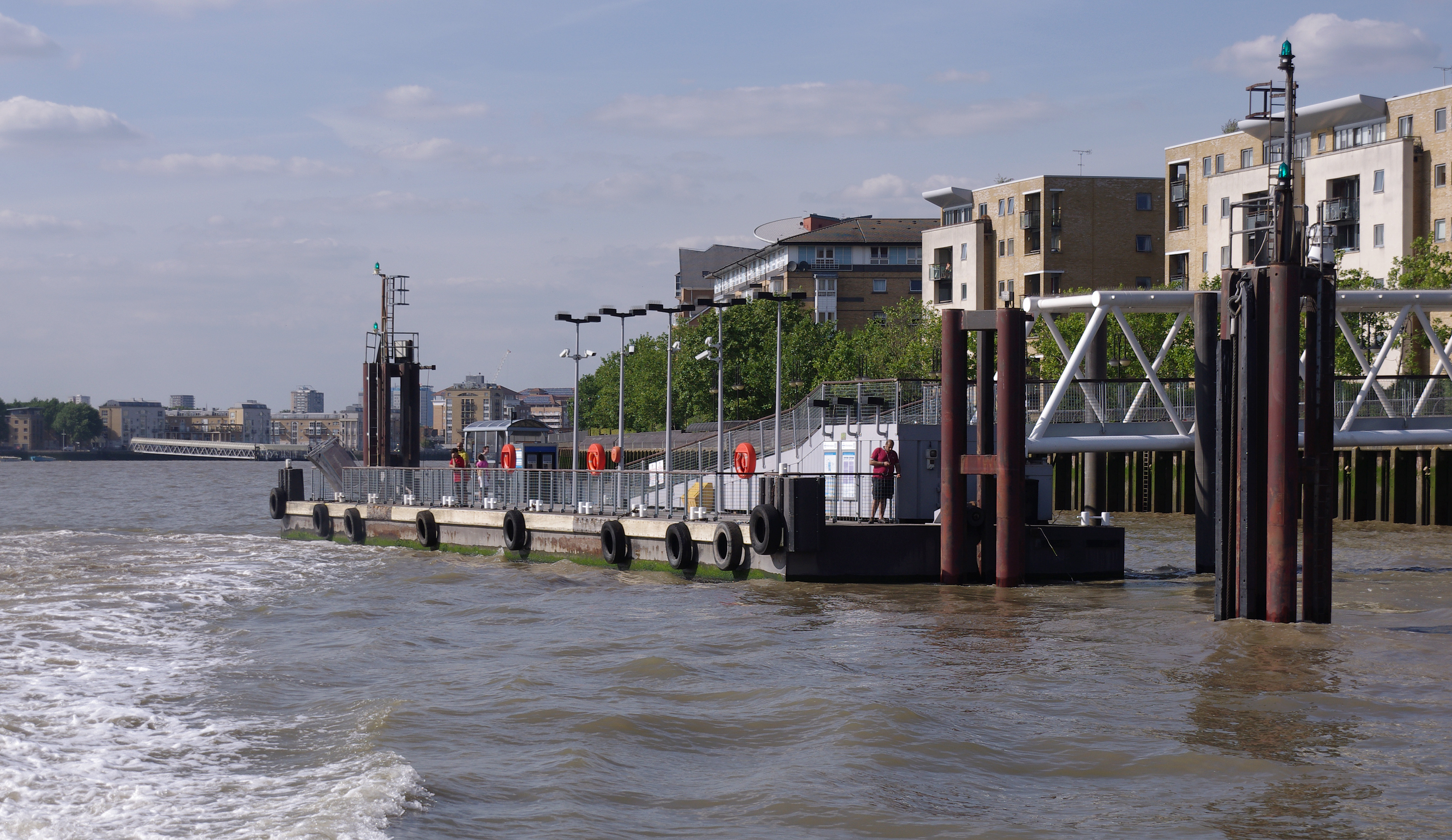
- Type: River bus services
- Location: River Thames, London, England
- Coordinates: 51.48753°N 0.022187°W
- Owner: London River Services
- Operator: Uber Boat by Thames Clippers

History
- Location within London Borough of Tower Hamlets

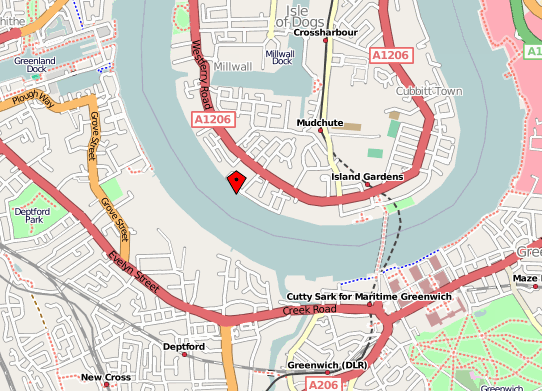

Masthouse Terrace Pier is a pier on the River Thames on the Isle of Dogs in London, England. It is located at the end of Napier Avenue, off Westferry Road, at the southern end of the Isle of Dogs, and provides river bus services operated by Uber Boat by Thames Clippers.

== Services ==
Masthouse Terrace is a stop on the River Thames commuter catamaran service run by Uber Boat by Thames Clippers from Embankment, via Tower Millennium Pier, Canary Wharf and on to North Greenwich for The O_{2} and Barking Riverside Pier.

Masthouse Terrace Pier temporarily closed between 14 January 2008 and 26 April 2008 for renovation work carried out by British Waterways, at a cost of £500,000. Transport for London provided a grant of £400,000 towards this work. The refurbishment work included installation of CCTV, a new waiting shelter, maintenance and repainting work.

== Connections ==
- London Buses routes 277 and D7

Preceding station	London River Services	Following station
Greenland (Surrey Quays) Pier towards Battersea Power Station Pier	RB1	Greenwich Pier towards Barking Riverside Pier
Greenland (Surrey Quays) Pier towards Putney Pier	RB6	Greenwich Pier towards Barking Riverside Pier
