= Greenwich foot tunnel =

Tunnel under the River Thames in London

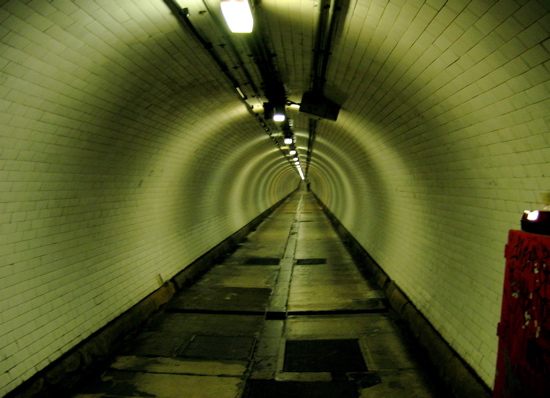
- Interactive map of Greenwich foot tunnel

Overview
- Official name: Greenwich Foot Tunnel
- Location: Greenwich/Millwall
- Crosses: River Thames
- Start: Royal Borough of Greenwich
- End: London Borough of Tower Hamlets

Operation
- Opened: 1902
- Owner: Jointly owned, along with Woolwich tunnel, by Royal Borough of Greenwich, London Borough of Tower Hamlets and London Borough of Newham
- Operator: Royal Borough of Greenwich
- Traffic: Pedestrian

Technical
- Design engineer: Sir Alexander Binnie
- Length: 1,215 ft (370 m)

The Greenwich Foot Tunnel crosses beneath the River Thames in East London.

The southern entrance is by the Cutty Sark in Greenwich (Royal Borough of Greenwich), with the northern entrance located at Island Gardens, a park at the southern tip of the Isle of Dogs (London Borough of Tower Hamlets).

Approximately 4,000 people use the tunnel (open 24/7) each day. It opened in 1902.

== Design and construction ==
Thames Tunnel (Greenwich to Millwall) Act 1897
- Act of Parliament
- Parliament of the United Kingdom
- Long title: An Act to empower the London County Council to make a Subway under the River Thames between Greenwich and Millwall and for other purposes connected therewith.
- Citation: 60 & 61 Vict. c. ccxxiv

Dates
- Royal assent: 6 August 1897

Text of statute as originally enacted

The tunnel was designed by civil engineer Sir Alexander Binnie for London County Council and constructed by contractor John Cochrane & Co. The project was authorised by the Thames Tunnel (Greenwich to Millwall) Act 1897 (60 & 61 Vict. c. ccxxiv).

Construction started in June 1899 and the tunnel opened on 4 August 1902. The tunnel replaced an expensive and sometimes unreliable ferry service allowing workers living south of the Thames to reach their workplaces in the London docks and shipyards in the Isle of Dogs area of the Metropolitan Borough of Poplar.

The cast-iron tunnel is 370.2 metres (1,215 ft) long, 15.2 metres (50 ft) deep and has an internal diameter of about 9 feet (2.74 m). The northern end was damaged by bombs during the Second World War and repairs included a thick steel and concrete inner lining, that narrows the available space for a few meters within the tunnel. The northern shaft staircase has 87 steps; the southern one has 100.

=== Upgrade and repair works ===
The tunnel has been the subject of frequent repair work, including in 2009, 2012, with further repair work being planned for 2026.

The lifts were out of action for a long period in 2021–22 which Greenwich Council attributed to an international supply chain problem affecting the supply of spare parts.

== Location ==
The tunnel links

- Greenwich town centre on the south bank of the Thames. Its entrance is close to the prow of the restored clipper Cutty Sark.

with

- parts of Docklands including Canary Wharf on the north bank. The tunnel's northern entrance is within Island Gardens, a park on the southern tip of the Isle of Dogs, with views across the river to the former Greenwich Hospital, the Queen's House and the Royal Greenwich Observatory.

=== Coordinates ===
- Greenwich entrance: 51.4833°N 0.0102°W
- Tower Hamlets entrance: 51.4866°N 0.0093°W

== Usage ==
A notice at the tunnel entrance states that the tunnel is private property (the Royal Borough of Greenwich manages the Greenwich and Woolwich foot tunnels on joint behalf of two other partners, the London Borough of Tower Hamlets and the London Borough of Newham) and not a public right of way. Ordnance Survey maps do not show a right of way on the route of the tunnel. A National Trail, the Thames Path, uses the tunnel to rejoin the southbound part of the path.

The 'Friends of Greenwich and Woolwich foot tunnels' (FOGWOFT) was established in September 2013. Following encouragement from FOGWOFT and information from the Institution of Civil Engineers, on 5 July 2016 an interpretative plaque was unveiled near the tunnel's Greenwich entrance by the deputy leader of Greenwich council.

With a continuing impasse in updating the bylaws, FOGWOFT disbanded in March 2021.

=== Cycling ===
Local bylaws require cyclists to dismount and push their bikes through the tunnel, although plans to remove this requirement have been considered. The shared spaces trial was supported by Greenwich council but Tower Hamlets refused permission to update the bylaws and the while some cyclists do ride in the tunnel, cycling is still not permitted.

The tunnel is also part of the UK's National Cycle Route 1 linking Inverness and Dover.

== Gallery ==
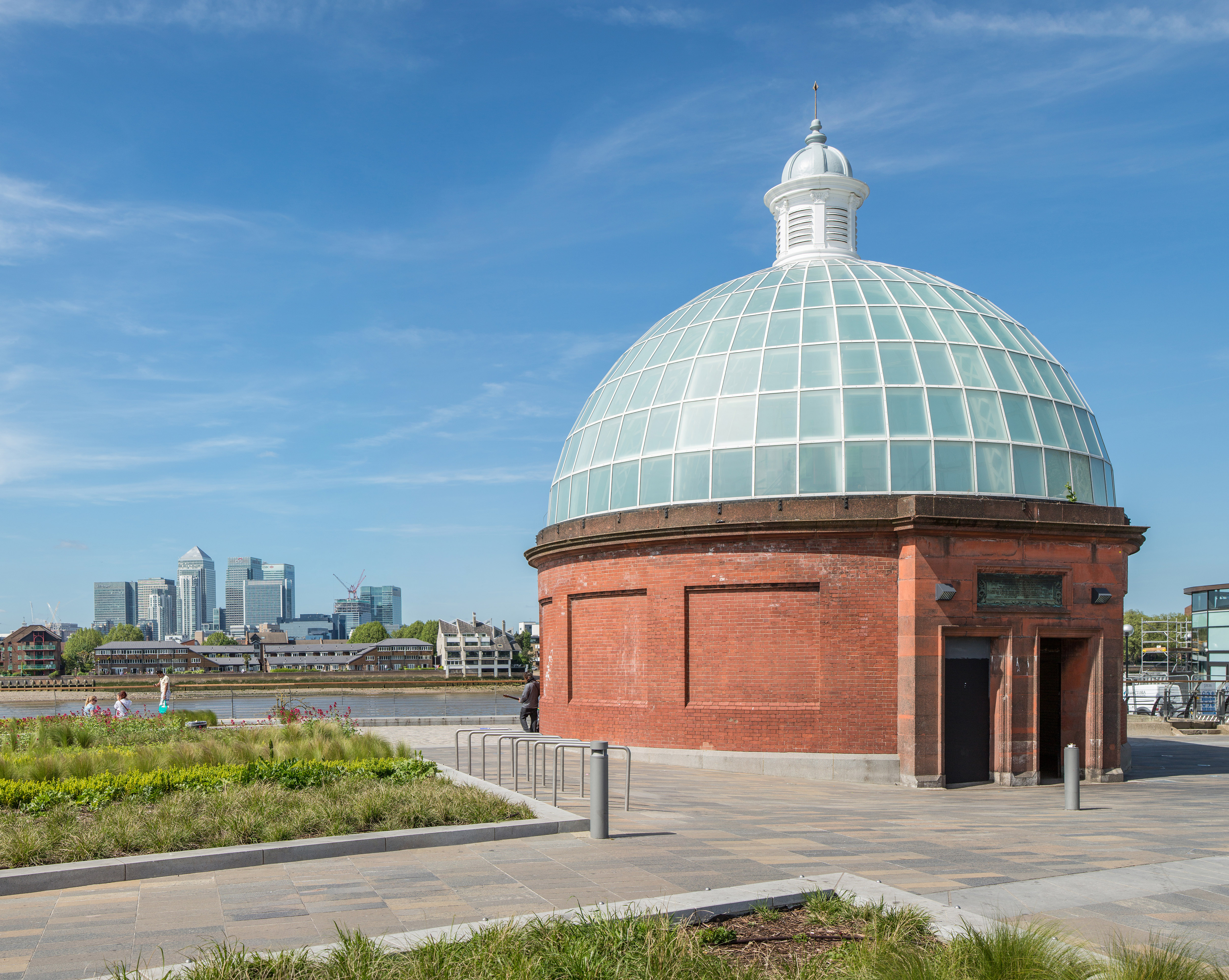
Southern entrance to Greenwich foot tunnel, with a view of Canary Wharf

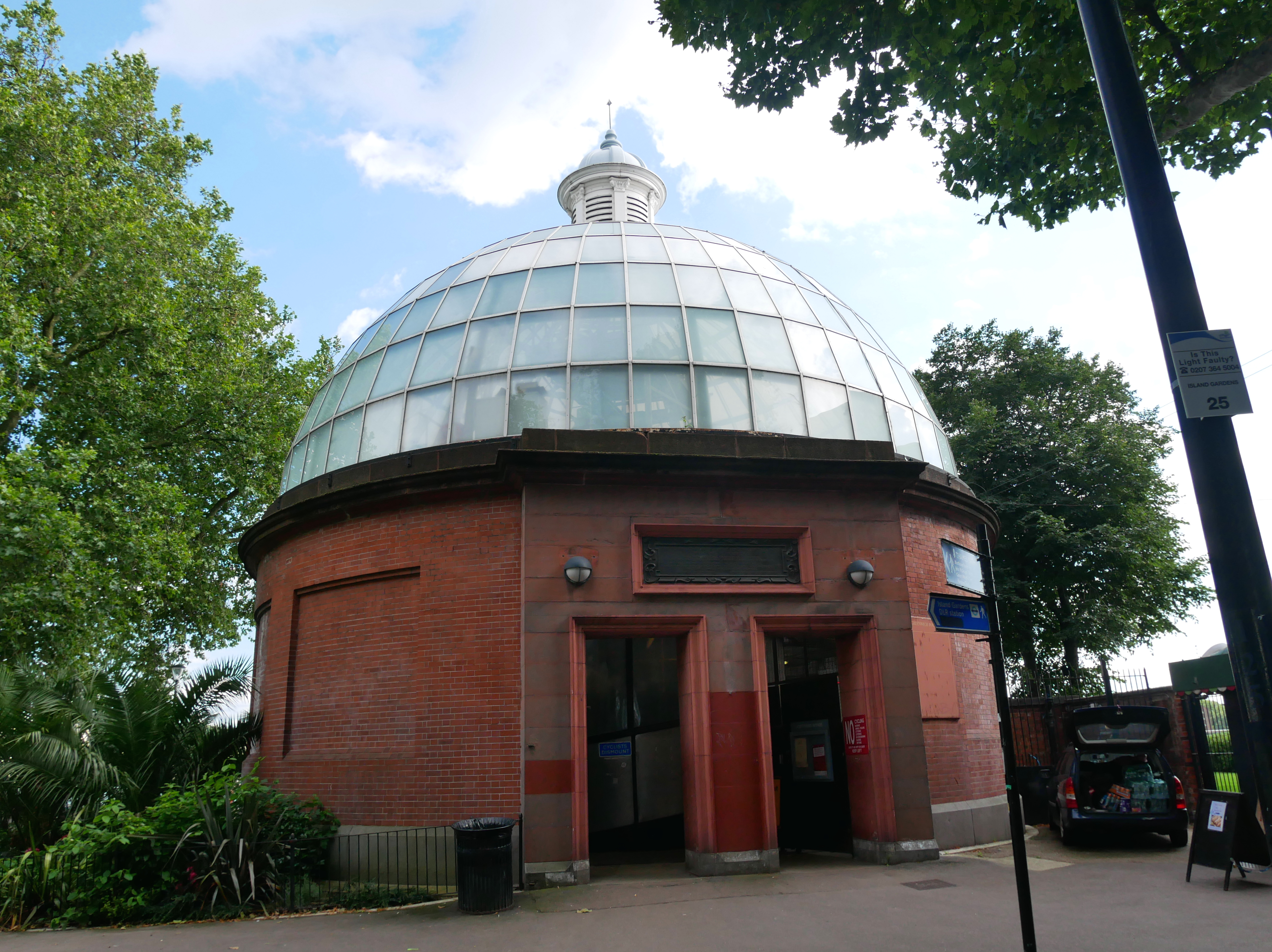
The northern entrance to the Greenwich foot tunnel on the Isle of Dogs

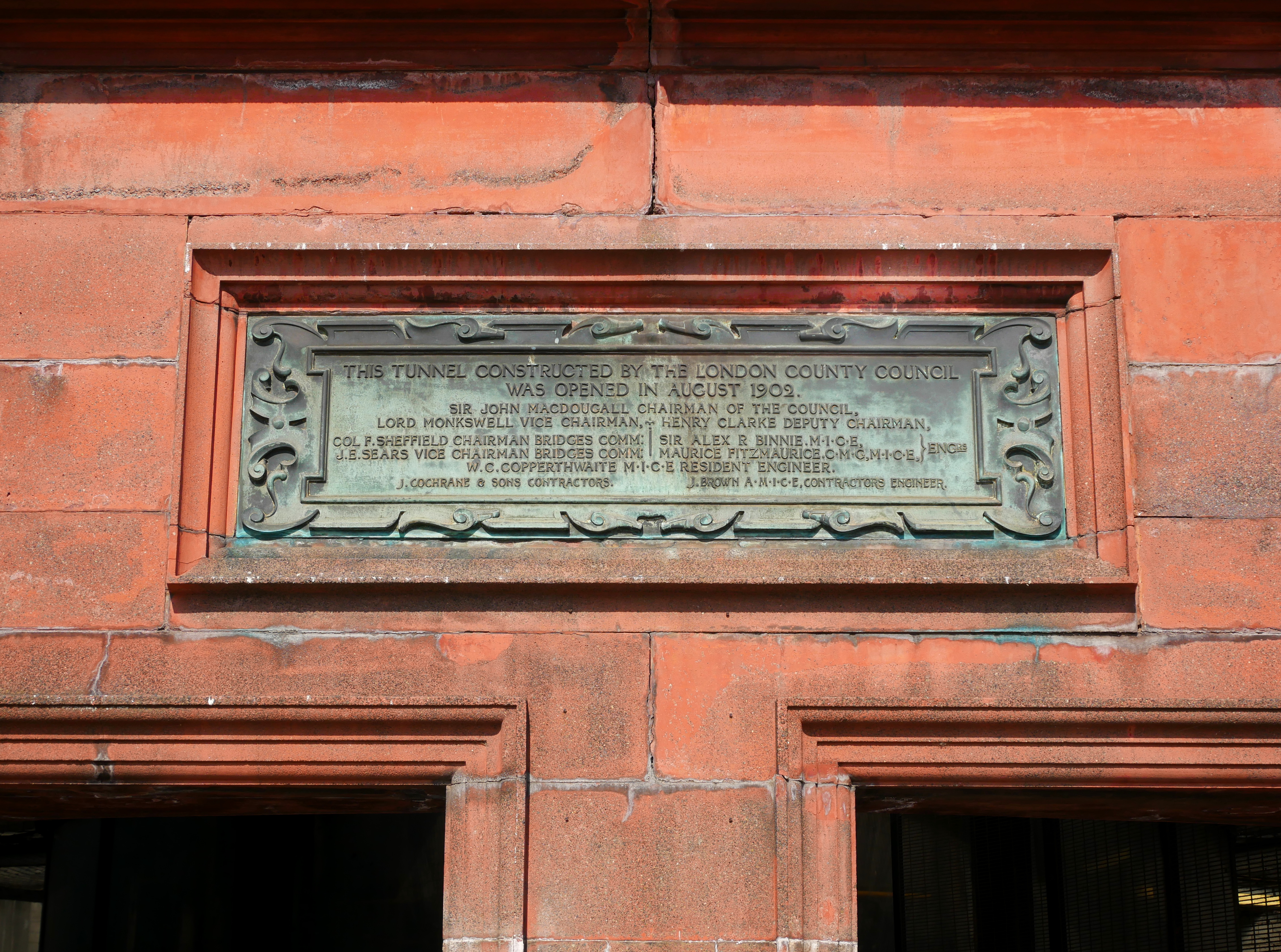
Plaque on the south entrance to the tunnel

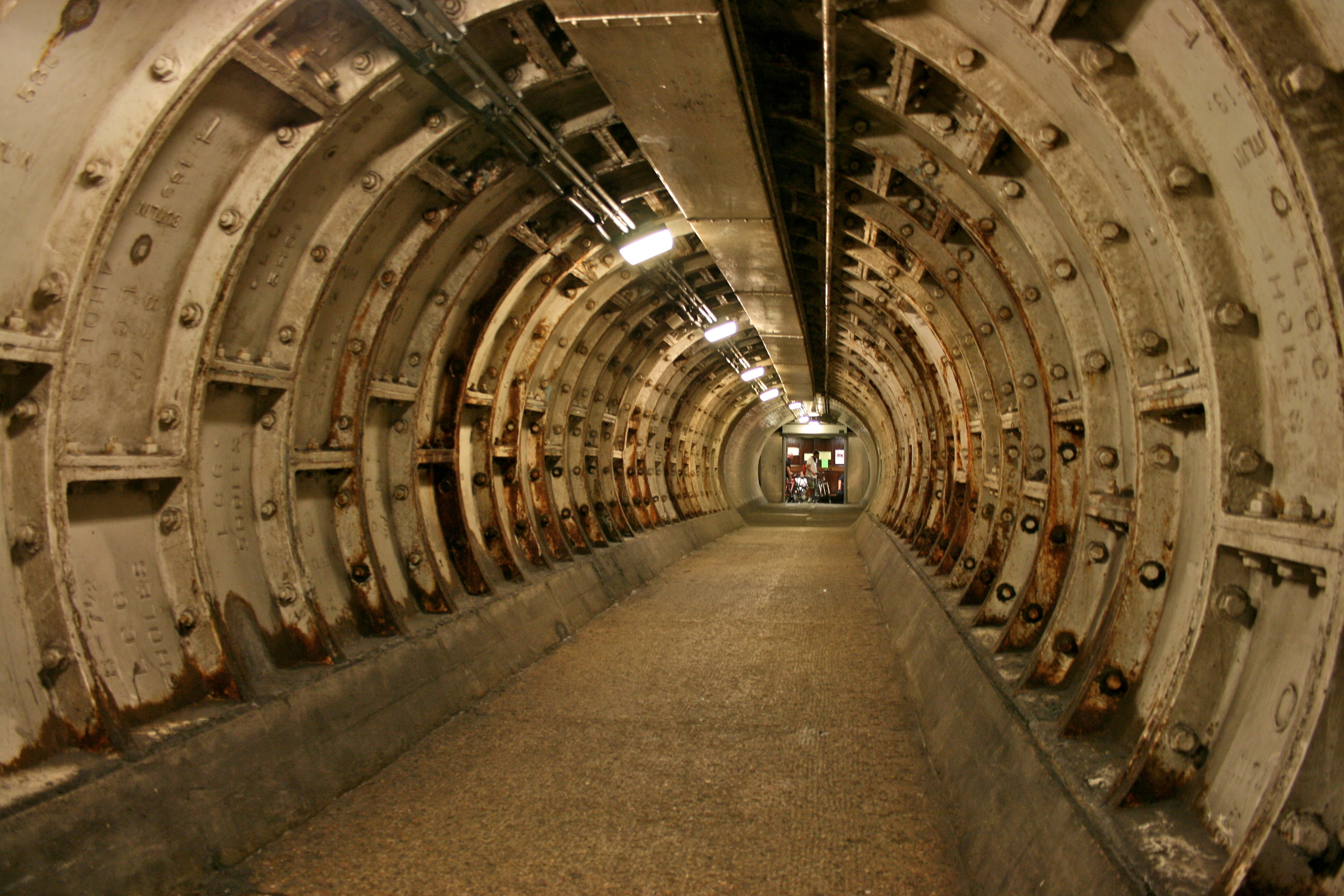
The section of the tunnel that was repaired following damage during World War II

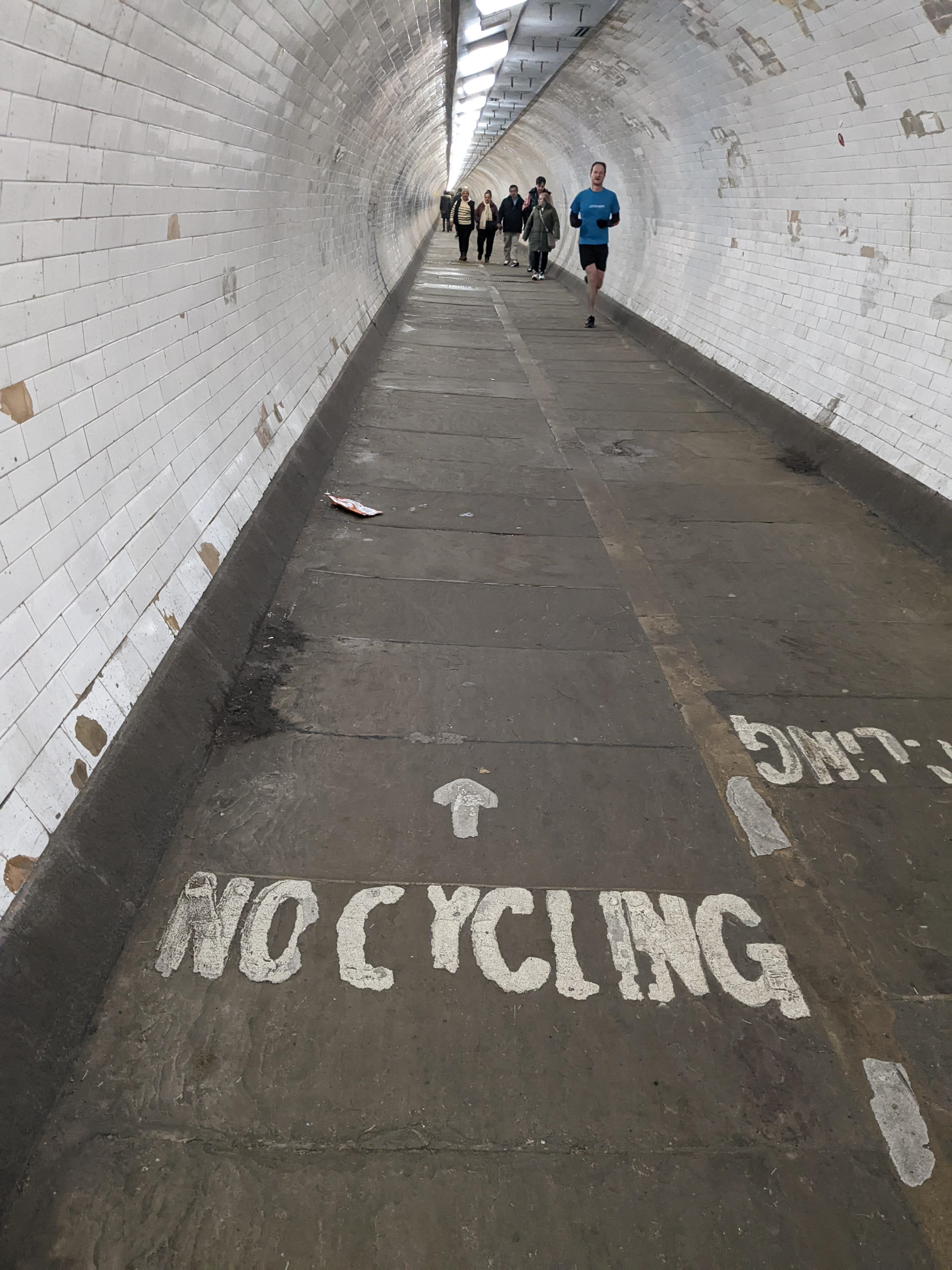
The "No Cycling" sign on the floor of the Greenwich Tunnel in 2023.

== See also ==
- Tunnels underneath the River Thames
- Crossings of the River Thames
