= Island Gardens =

Public park in the London Borough of Tower Hamlets

Coordinates: 51°29′13.4″N 00°00′28.5″W

Island Gardens is a public park located at the southern end of the Isle of Dogs in the London Borough of Tower Hamlets on the north bank of the River Thames. The park was formally opened on 3 August 1895 by Will Crooks, a prominent local politician in the then Metropolitan Borough of Poplar.

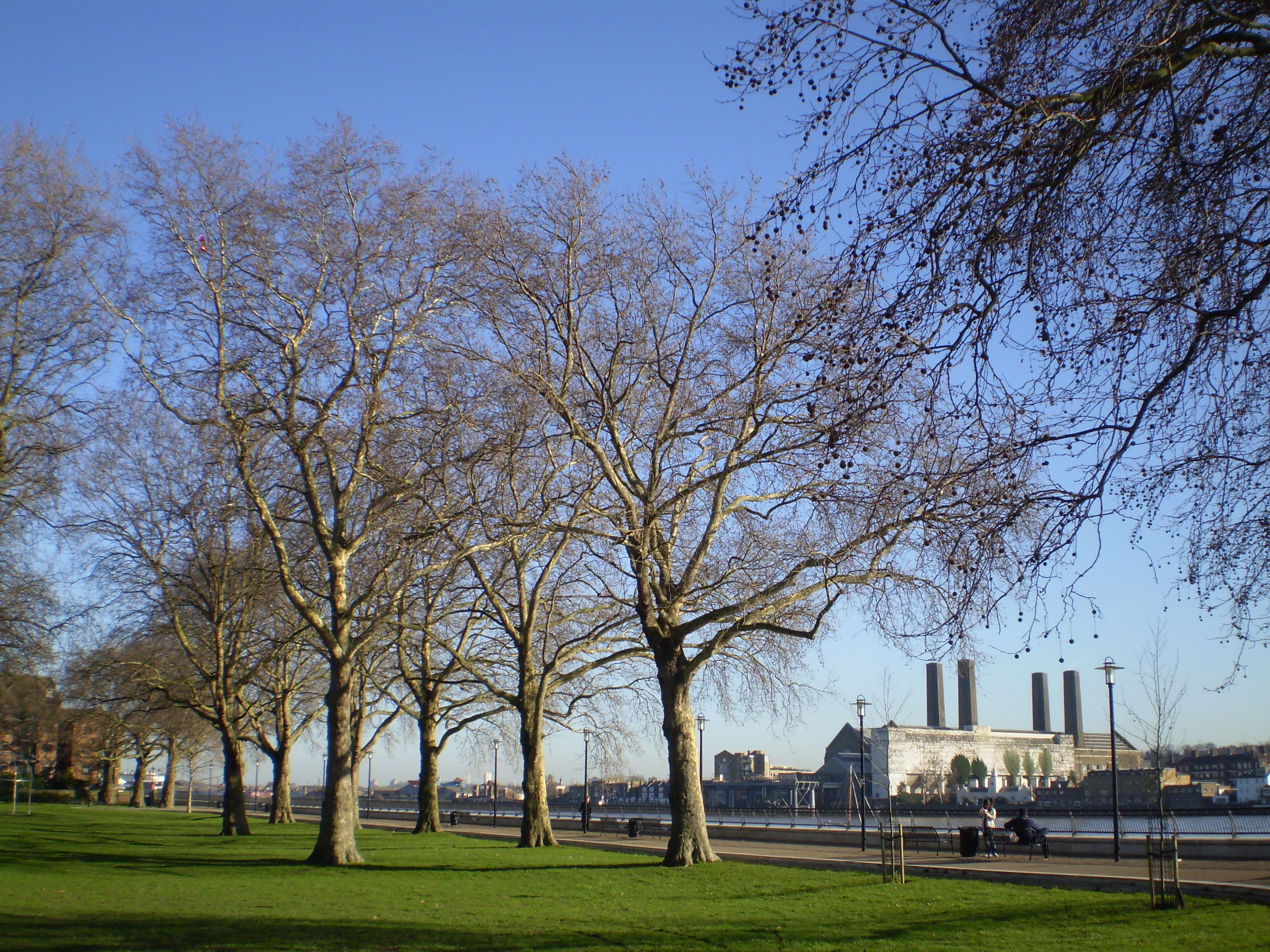
Island Gardens park

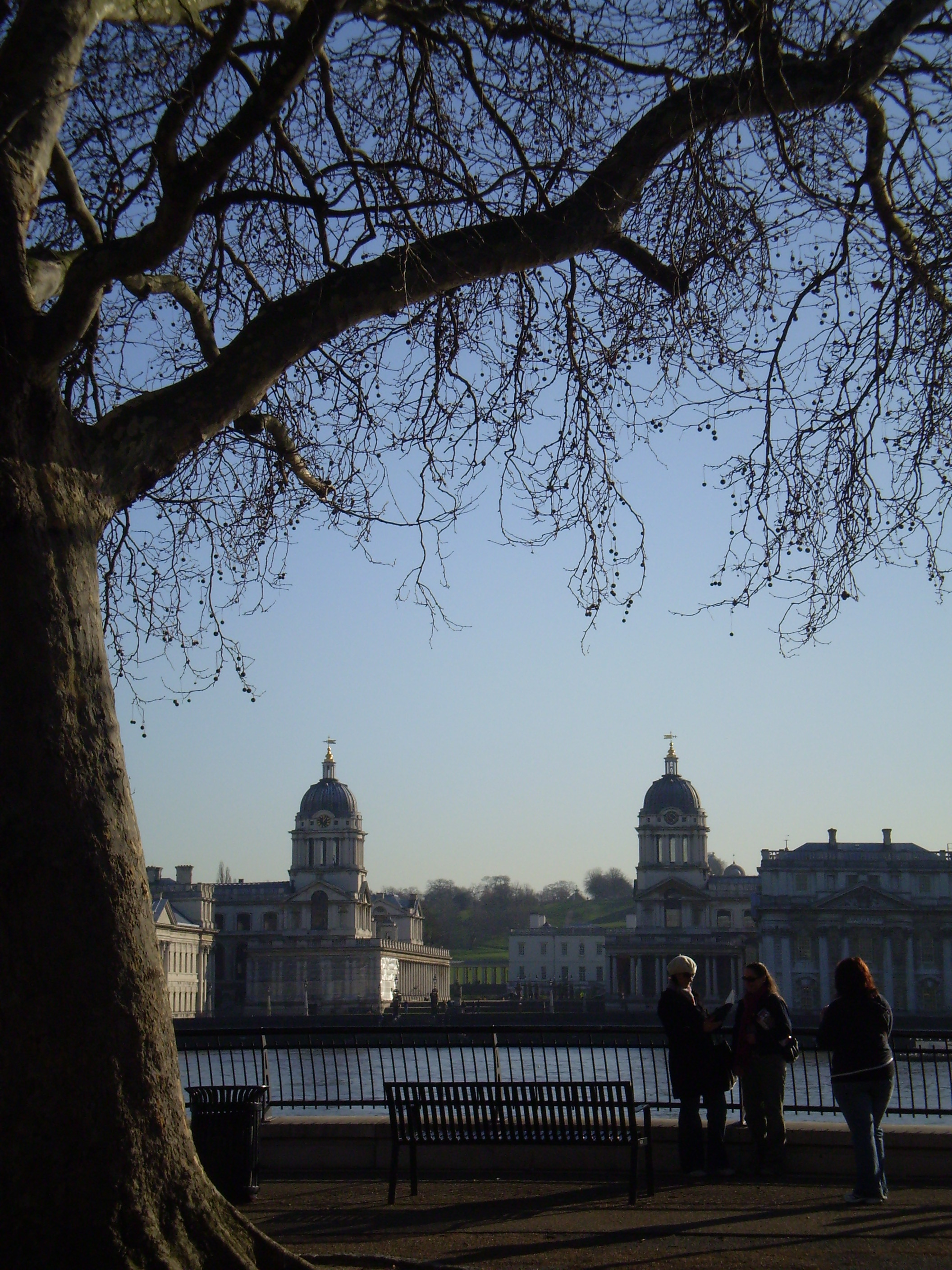
View of the former Greenwich Hospital from Island Gardens

The 1.12-hectare (2.8-acre) waterside park is notable for its cross-river view of the classical buildings of the former Greenwich Hospital, the Cutty Sark and the National Maritime Museum, with Greenwich Park forming a backdrop. The northern entrance of the Greenwich foot tunnel is also within the park. It is almost certain that the view from this location is the one that the Canaletto painting "Greenwich Hospital from the North Bank of the Thames" is taken from, though whether Canaletto himself actually visited the site is in doubt.

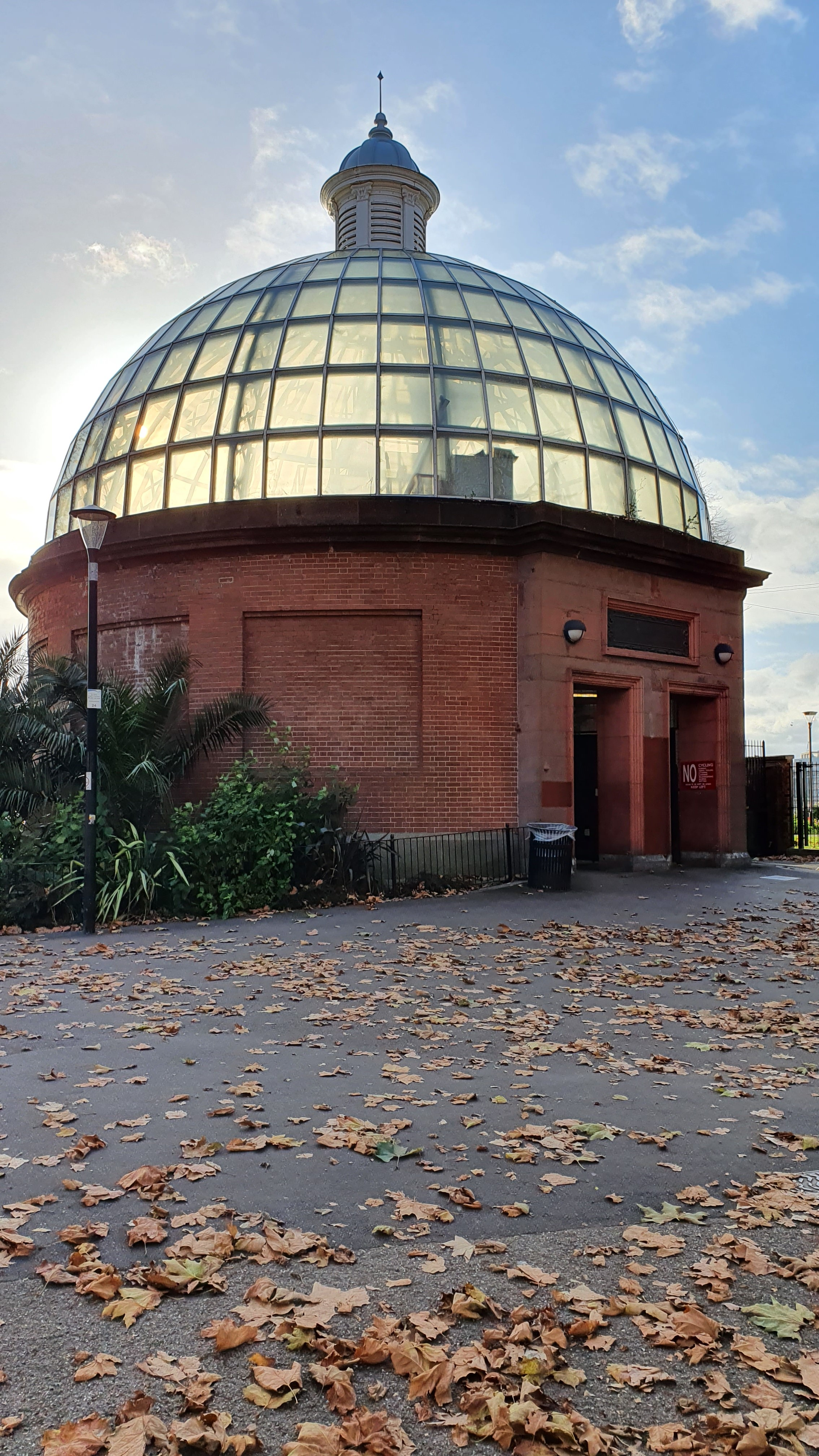
Northern entrance to Greenwich Foot Tunnel

The park also gave its name to Island Gardens DLR station. This opened in 1987 as the southern terminus of the DLR's initial system, and was an elevated terminal station situated to the west of the park. The later construction of the DLR extension to Lewisham involved a tunnel under the Thames, and Island Gardens station was relocated about 100 metres (330 ft) north, close to the northern entrance to the tunnel by Millwall Park. The new station is largely underground; the original elevated station was demolished.
