= South Quay DLR station =

Docklands Light Railway station

South Quay
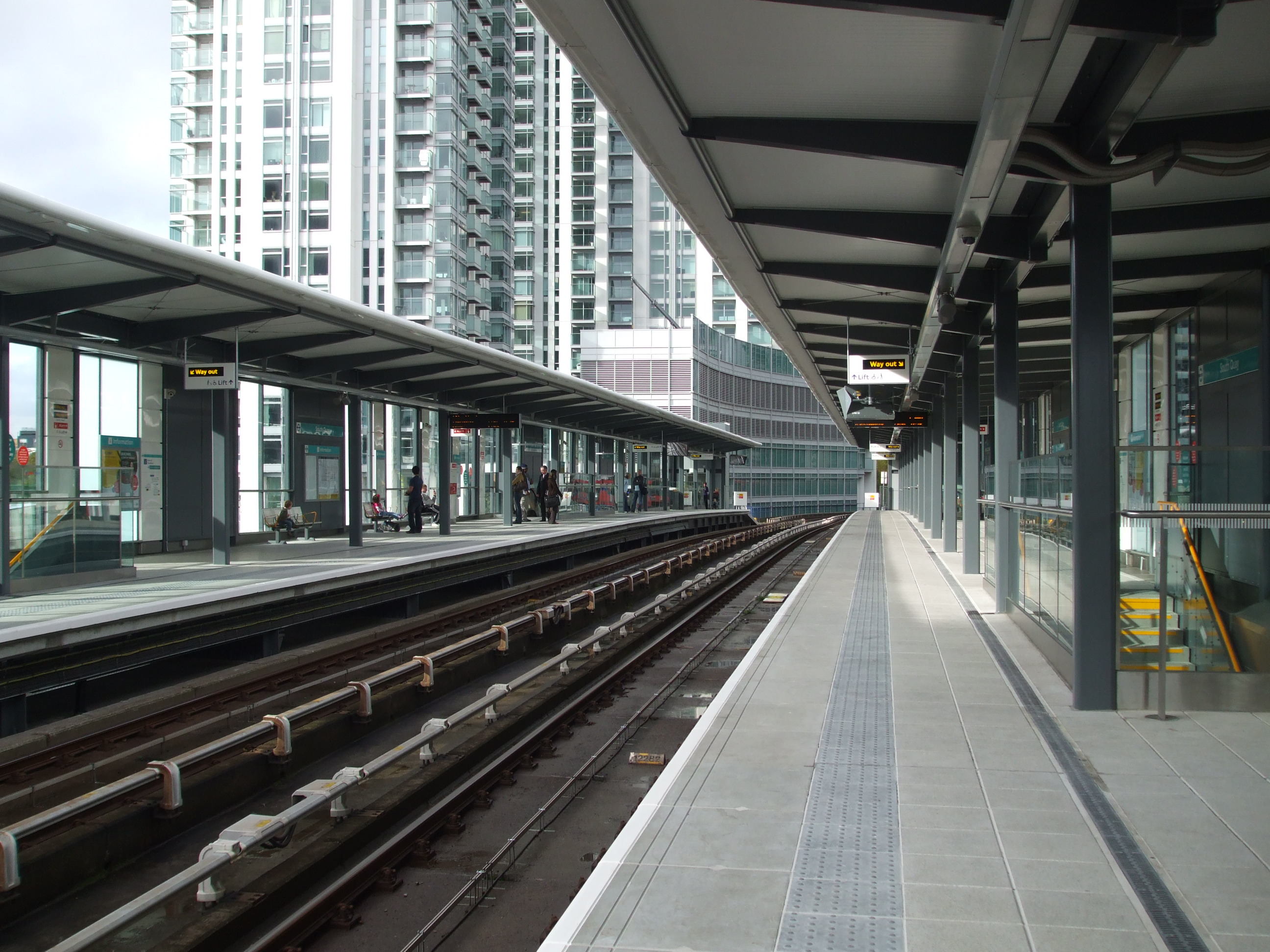
- Looking west at the platforms

General information
- Location: Millwall, Tower Hamlets
- Coordinates: 51.4998°N 0.0161°W
- Owned by: Transport for London
- Managed by: Docklands Light Railway
- Platforms: 2

Construction
- Structure type: Elevated
- Accessible: Yes

Other information
- Status: Unstaffed
- Fare zone: 2
- Website: Edit this at Wikidata

History
- Opened: 31 August 1987

Key dates
- 1994: Refurbished
- 1996: Rebuilt after bombing
- 2009: Rebuilt and resited

Passengers

DLR annual entry and exit
- 2020: ▼1.991 million
- 2021: ▲2.497 million
- 2022: ▲3.940 million
- 2023: ▲4.550 million
- 2024: ▼4.13 million
Location
- Location in Tower Hamlets

South Quay is a Docklands Light Railway (DLR) station on the Isle of Dogs, East London, England. The station is between Crossharbour and Heron Quays stations and is in London fare zone 2. South Quay is in Millwall and is located on the southern shore of the South Dock of the West India Docks; the current station platforms sit astride the channel connecting Millwall Dock to the West India Docks.

== History ==
The original South Quay station opened in 1987 in Millwall and was a standard DLR phase 1 elevated station, subsequently extended to permit the use of 2 unit trains.

In 1996, near the station, the Docklands bombing killed 2 people and injured over 30. The IRA had claimed responsibility for it. A memorial plaque at the station was unveiled in December 2009, commemorating the victims of the 1996 bombing.

=== Relocation ===
The station was constrained by sharp curves at both ends and could not be further extended on its former site. The DLR's plan to operate three-unit trains on this line included the relocation of this station to a new site over Millwall Dock some distance to the east, resulting in the relocated station partly being in Cubitt Town.

In October 2004, Transport for London announced plans to close and replace South Quay station with a station at a new location because of increased use of the Docklands Light Railway. The reason for the move was that the platforms could only accommodate two-unit trains. They would need to be lengthened by thirty metres for three-unit trains but the curves either side of the station precluded extension work.

The new station, on a straight section of track 125 metres (410 ft) to the east, opened on 26 October 2009 with the old station closing on 23 October 2009.

== Services ==
The typical off-peak service in trains per hour from South Quay is:

- 12 tph to Bank
- 12 tph to Lewisham

Additional services call at the station during the peak hours, increasing the service to up to 22 tph in each direction, with up to 8 tph during the peak hours running to and from Stratford instead of Bank.

Preceding station	DLR	Following station
Heron Quays towards Bank or Stratford	Docklands Light Railway	Crossharbour towards Lewisham

== Connections ==
London Buses route D8 serves the station.

== Surrounding area ==
South Quay is surrounded by commercial offices and residential developments and their for the residential, commercial and entertainment development in this part of Millwall. The highrise Pan Peninsula Towers is immediately adjacent to the station. A small shopping centre, South Quay Plaza, is across the road from the station. The Hilton London Canary Wharf hotel is also close to the station. Further afield, the southern shore of the South Dock of the West India Docks to the west of the station is lined with restaurants. The South Quay Footbridge provides a connection to the Canary Wharf private estate.
