= St John's Estate =

Housing estate in Cubitt Town, London

Coordinates: 51°29′48″N 0°0′41″W

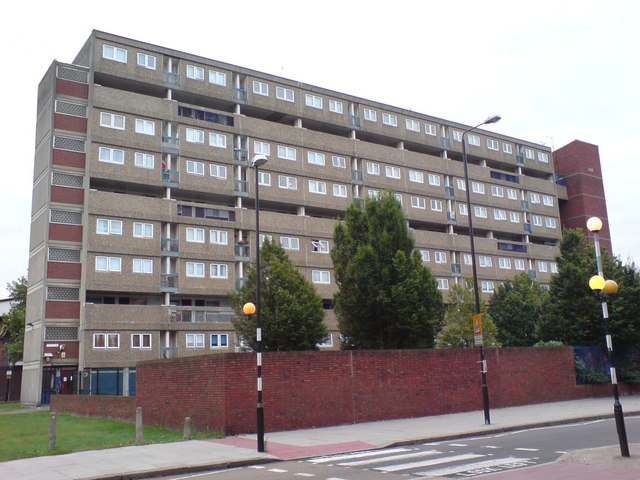
- Alice Shepherd House
- Interactive map of St John's Estate

General information
- Location: Cubitt Town
- Area: Isle of Dogs
- No. of units: 607

Construction
- Authority: Poplar Borough Council
- Style: Modernist

Other information
- Governing body: Tower Hamlets Council

St John's Estate is a housing estate in Cubitt Town, on the Isle of Dogs in London. Centred on the triangle formed by Manchester Road, East Ferry Road and Glengall Grove, it was developed by Poplar Borough Council after the Second World War. It is served by Crossharbour DLR station to which it is adjacent.

John Betjeman described it as "one of the best new housing estates I have seen since the war, comparable with Lansbury, intimately proportioned, cheerful and airy yet London-like".

In 2005 One Housing Group acquired ownership of the estate, and subsequently published a plan in 2014 to begin demolishing it to replace with privately rented housing. Following opposition by the estate's residents, the Mayor of Tower Hamlets negotiated the withdrawal of the plans. In 2022 new plans were approved for the demolition and rebuilding of the estate.

== See also ==
- Samuda Estate
