= Cubitt Town =

Area on the Isle of Dogs in London, England

Coordinates: 51.49748°N 0.00616°W

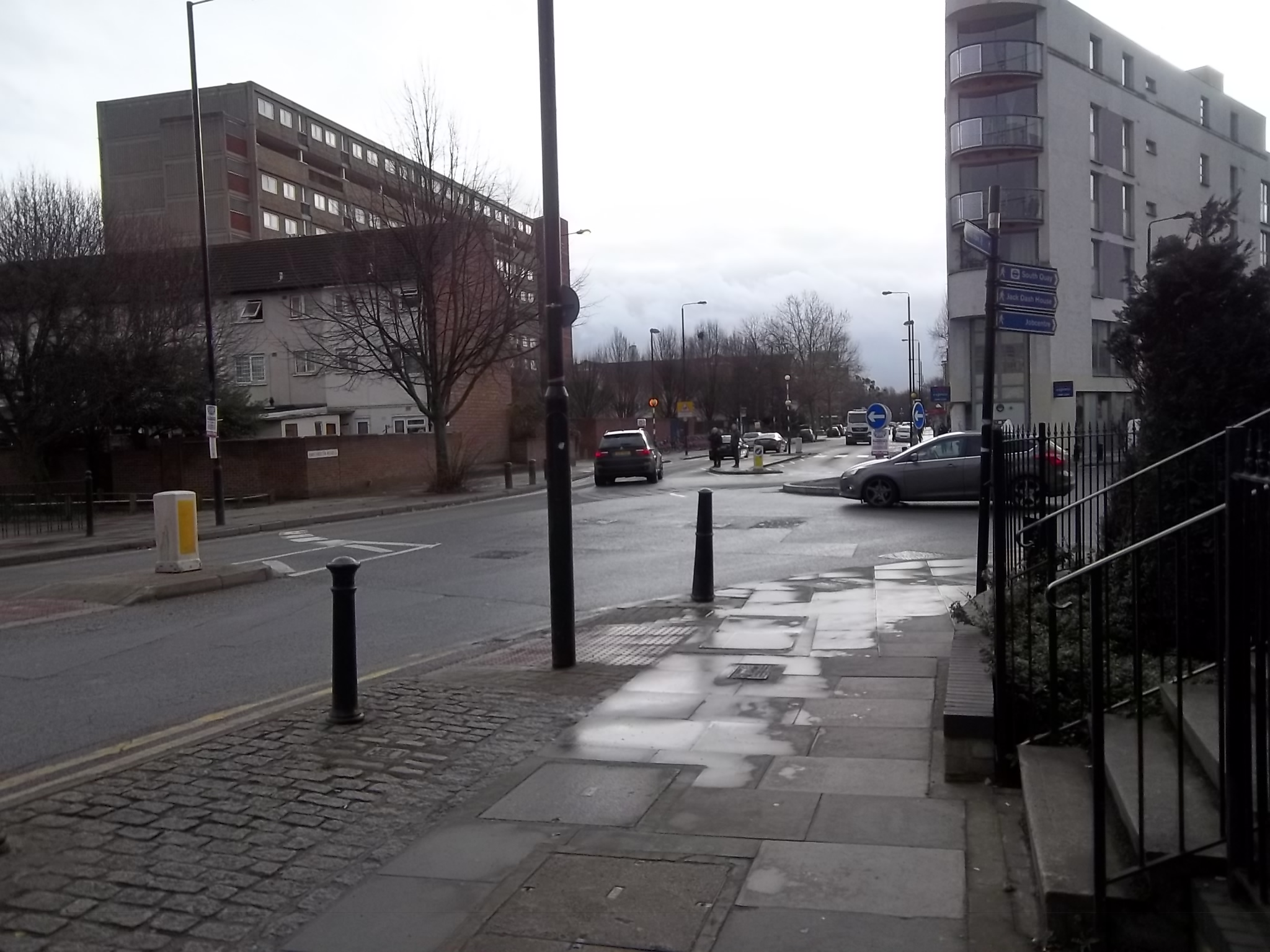
- Manchester Road.

- Location within Greater London
- OS grid reference: TQ385795
- London borough: Tower Hamlets
- Ceremonial county: Greater London
- Region: London
- Country: England
- Sovereign state: United Kingdom
- Post town: LONDON
- Postcode district: E14
- Dialling code: 020
- Police: Metropolitan
- Fire: London
- Ambulance: London
- UK Parliament: Poplar and Limehouse
- London Assembly: City and East

Cubitt Town is a district on the eastern side of the Isle of Dogs in London, England. This part of the former Metropolitan Borough of Poplar was redeveloped as part of the Port of London in the 1840s and 1850s by William Cubitt, Lord Mayor of London (1860–1862), after whom it is named. It is on the east of the Isle, facing the Royal Borough of Greenwich across the River Thames. To the west is the Millwall Inner Dock with Millwall beyond it. To the east and south is Greenwich, to the northwest Canary Wharf, and to the north — across the Blue Bridge — is Blackwall. The district is situated within the Blackwall & Cubitt Town Ward of Tower Hamlets London Borough Council.

== History ==
A map showing the Cubitt Town ward of Poplar Metropolitan Borough as it appeared in 1916.

It is named after William Cubitt, Lord Mayor of London (1860–1862), who was responsible for the development of the housing and amenities of the area in the 1840s and 1850s, mainly to house the growing population of workers in the local docks, shipbuilding yards and factories. As it grew, Cubitt also created many local businesses employing manual labourers as well as the streets of housing to accommodate them.

=== Shipbuilding ===
The area was home shipbuilders including Westwood, Baillie, Samuda Brothers, J & W Dudgeon and Yarrow Shipbuilders. HMS Prince Albert, the first British warship designed to carry her main armament in gun turrets, was launched here.

=== Other industries ===
The businesses included those involved in cement, pottery and brick production. Asphalt production was another growth industry, coinciding with the growth, development, and industrialisation of areas throughout the British Isles. In Cubitt Town, the Pyrimont Wharf was developed in 1861 by the Asphalte de Seyssel Company of Thames Embankment (later known as the Seyssel Asphalte Company or Seyssel Pyrimont Asphalte Company), with asphalt production taken over in the 1870s by Claridge's Patent Asphalte Company.

== Housing ==
Estates in the area include:

- New Union Wharf Estate - East Thames Housing
- Samuda Estate - One Housing
- St John's Estate - One Housing
- Amsterdam Road - Private
- Millennium Wharf - Private

The area is a mix of old east London working-class communities transplanted into 1960s and 1970s high-rise estates and the middle-class workers in the Canary Wharf complex attracted by relatively low prices for riverside living, plus less recent Bangladeshi and East Asian immigrant populations.

== Learning and education ==
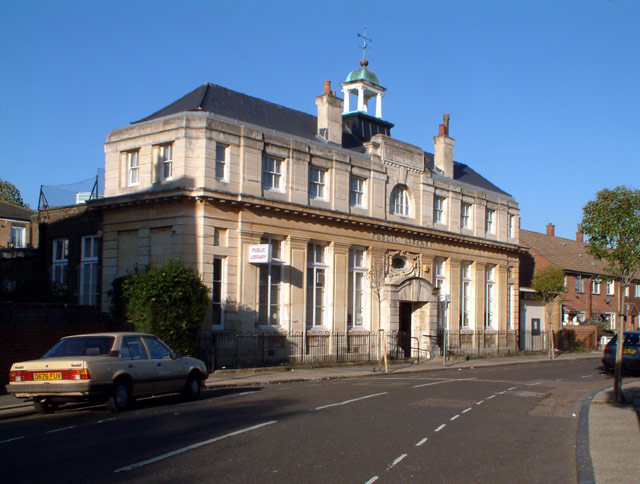
Cubitt Town Library, Strattondale Street, London E14 3HG

A public library was financed by Andrew Carnegie and built by C. Harrold Norton, being completed in 1905. Will Crooks, the then Mayor of Poplar, had attended a meeting at the Guildhall, where Carnegie had promised to fund public libraries. Crooks was able to get a commitment from him to pay for two libraries, this one in Cubitt Town and another in Bromley by Bow. Carnegie agreed to provide £15,000 for both together. The total expense for this building was £6,805 13s 10d, which included some neighbouring land which originally served as a public garden before providing space for an extension to be used a meeting hall and erected in 1962.

The building is currently owned by the Tower Hamlets London Borough Council as part of their library service.

=== Schools ===
==== Primary schools ====
- Cubitt Town School
- St Luke's School
- George Green's School

== Recreation ==
Cubitt town is home to a number of recreational facilities:

- St John's Park
- Mudchute, an urban farm, large at 32 acres (13 ha).

== Transport ==
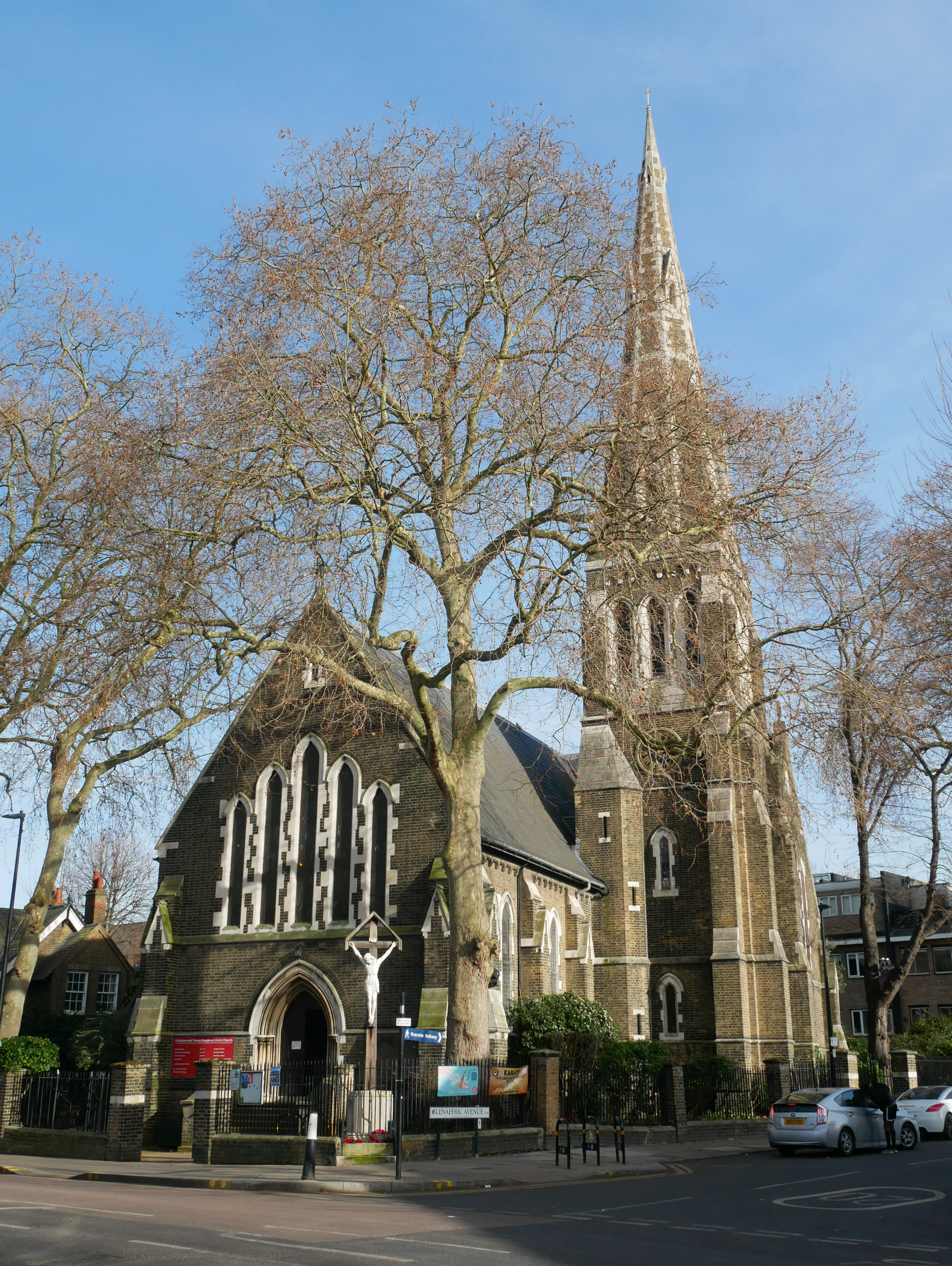
Christ Church in Cubitt Town, built in 1852-54 and now a Grade II* listed building

The nearest station to Cubitt Town is Crossharbour on the Docklands Light Railway, which opened on 31 August 1987.

London Buses contracted routes serve Cubitt Town, with routes 135, 277, D7, D8 and N550.

Cubitt Town is connected to London's road network by the north-south Manchester Road A1206.

Access across the River Thames is by the Greenwich Foot Tunnel and the National Cycle Route 1 to the west (which also uses the Greenwich Foot Tunnel).

== Nearest places ==
- Canary Wharf
- Coldharbour
- Millwall
- Blackwall
