= Crossharbour DLR station =

Docklands Light Railway station

Crossharbour
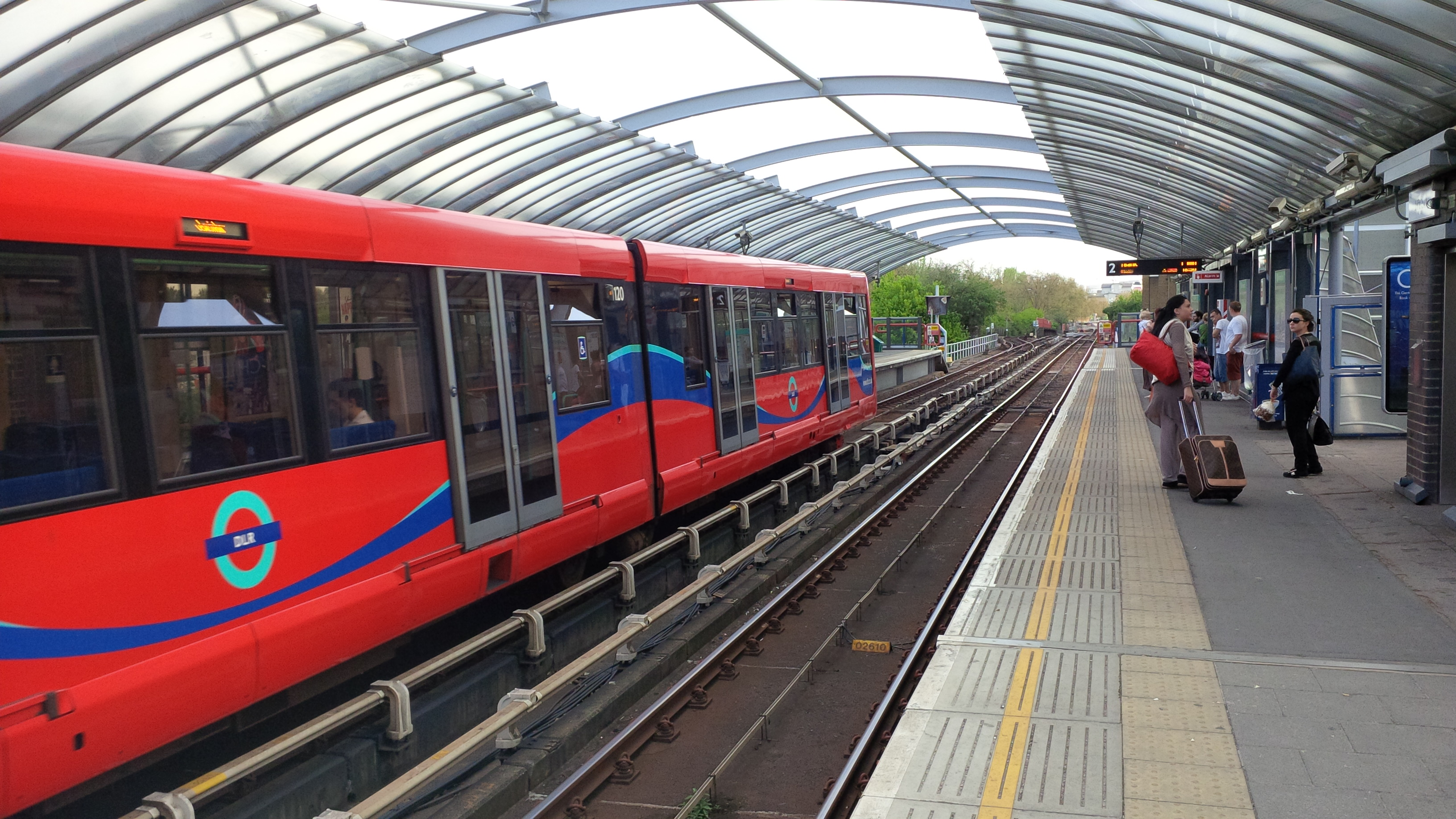
- Looking south at the platforms in 2013

General information
- Location: Cubitt Town, Tower Hamlets]
- Coordinates: 51.4956°N 0.0144°W
- Owner: Transport for London
- Manager: Docklands Light Railway
- Platforms: 2

Construction
- Structure type: Elevated
- Accessible: Yes

Other information
- Status: Unstaffed
- Fare zone: 2
- Website: Official website

History
- Opened: 31 August 1987
- Former names: Crossharbour and London Arena (1994–2006)

Passengers

DLR annual entry and exit
- 2021: ▲2.261 million
- 2022: ▲3.350 million
- 2023: ▲3.700 million
- 2024: ▼3.07 million
- 2025: ▼2.96 million
Location
- Location in Tower Hamlets

Crossharbour is a light metro station on the Docklands Light Railway (DLR) Bank-Lewisham Line in Cubitt Town, East London. The station is situated on the Isle of Dogs and is between Mudchute and South Quay stations and is in London fare zone 2.

The Docklands Light Railway station opened as "Crossharbour" on 31 August 1987 on the site of the former Millwall Docks railway station, and was renamed in 1994 to "Crossharbour and London Arena". Since the neighbouring London Arena has been demolished (in 2006) the original name has been reinstated. The name "Crossharbour" refers to the nearby Glengall Bridge across Millwall Inner Dock.

== Layout ==
There are two platforms at the station with a reversing siding between the two running tracks just to the south of the station, and some trains (mainly from Stratford DLR station) used to terminate here as Lewisham DLR station was unable to handle too many trains. Nowadays however, it is rare to see trains terminate at Crossharbour, as many trains from Stratford now terminate at Canary Wharf DLR station.

The St John's Estate is a social housing estate adjacent to the DLR station.

== Services ==
The typical off-peak service in trains per hour from Crossharbour is:

- 12 tph to Bank
- 12 tph to Lewisham

Additional services call at the station during the peak hours, increasing the service to up to 22 tph in each direction, with up to 8 tph during the peak hours running to and from Stratford instead of Bank.

Preceding station	DLR	Following station
South Quay towards Bank or Stratford	Docklands Light Railway	Mudchute towards Lewisham

== Connections ==
London Buses routes 135, 277, D6, D8 and night route N277 serve the station.
