= C. Harrold Norton =

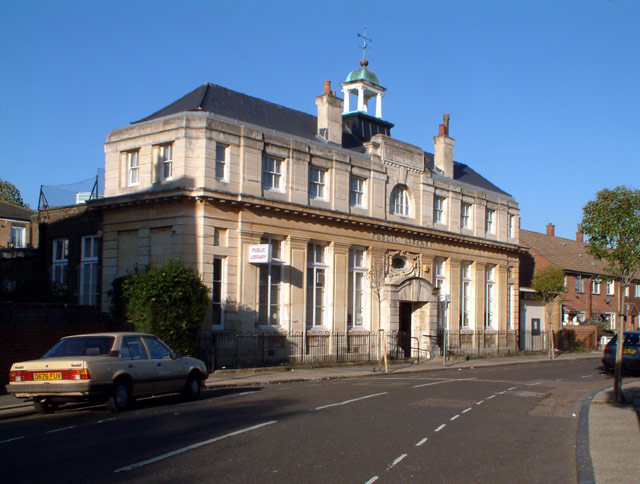
Cubitt Town Library, Strattondale Street, London E14 3HG

Charles Harrold Norton (1867–1942) (often referred to as C. Harrold Norton) was an English architect active in England and Scotland.

Norton served as an assistant to Andrew Noble Prentice, a Scottish architect based in London, before establishing an architectural practice of his own in 1899.

In 1904–5 he built the Public Library in Strattondale Street, Cubitt Town on the Isle of Dogs, London. The building was financed by Andrew Carnegie.
