= Docklands Light Railway =

Automated light metro system in London

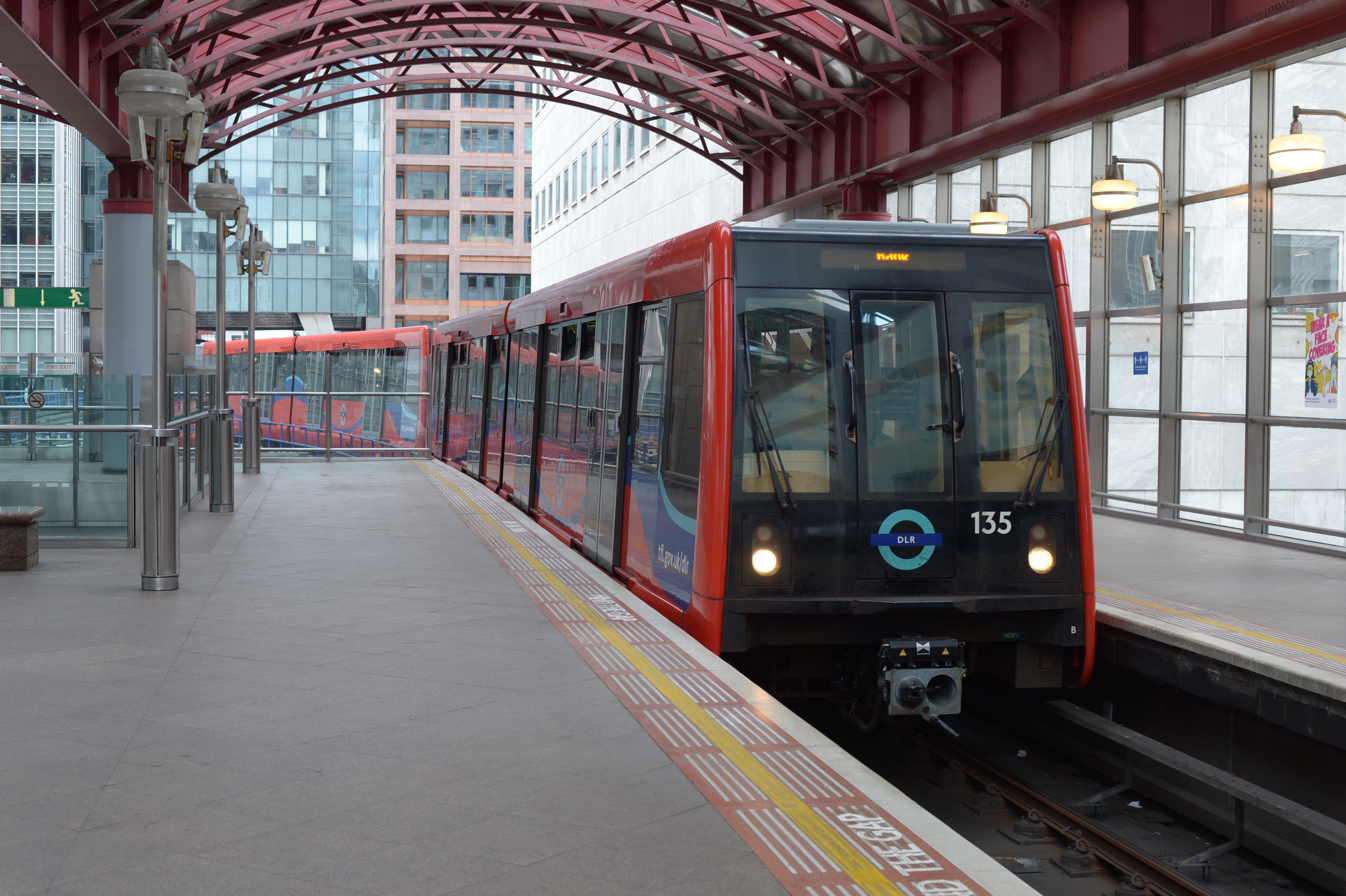
- A DLR B07 stock train at Canary Wharf DLR station

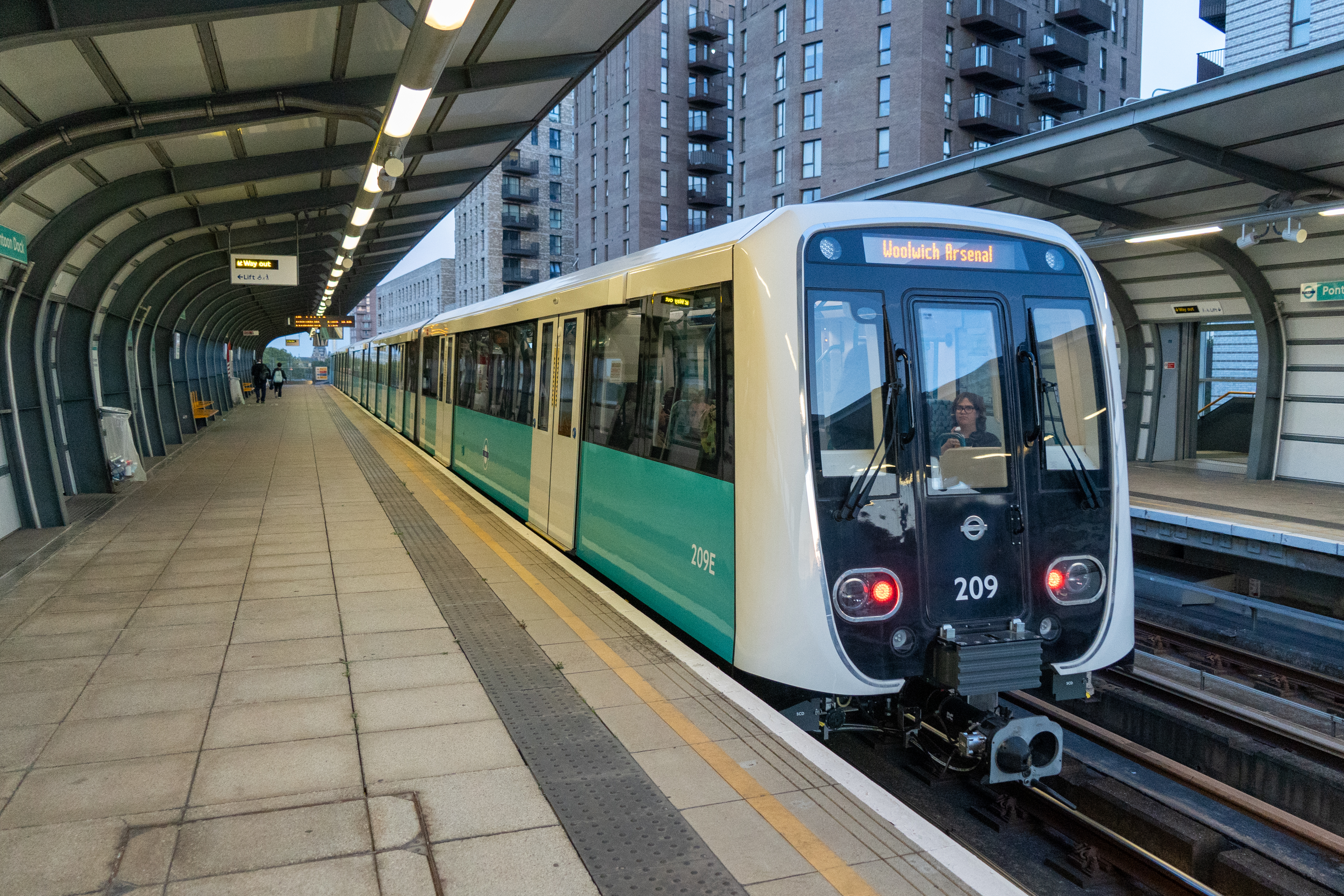
- A DLR B23 stock train at Pontoon Dock DLR station

Overview
- Owner: Docklands Light Railway Ltd, part of Transport for London
- Area served: London
- Locale: Greater London
- Transit type: Light metro
- Number of lines: 3
- Number of stations: 45
- Annual ridership: 90.8 million (2025/26) ▼7%
- Headquarters: Endeavour Square, London, E20
- Website: tfl.gov.uk/modes/dlr/

Operation
- Began operation: 31 August 1987; 39 years ago
- Operators: KeolisAmey (Keolis 70%, Amey 30%) (2014–2033)
- Number of vehicles: 149
- Headway: 3–5 minutes

Technical
- System length: 38 km (24 mi)
- No. of tracks: 2
- Track gauge: 4 ft 8 1/2 in (1,435 mm) standard gauge
- Minimum radius of curvature: 125 ft (38 m)
- Electrification: Third rail, 750 V DC
- Top speed: 50 mph (80 km/h)(Maximum Speed Capable); 40 mph (64 km/h) (Regular Operational Speed)
Transport for London rail lines
London Underground
Bakerloo
Central
Circle
District
Hammersmith & City
Jubilee
Metropolitan
Northern
Piccadilly
Victoria
Waterloo & City
London Overground
Liberty
Lioness
Mildmay
Suffragette
Weaver
Windrush
Other TfL Modes
DLR
Elizabeth line
London Trams

The Docklands Light Railway (DLR) is an automated light metro system primarily serving the redeveloped Docklands area of London and providing a direct connection between London's two major financial districts, Canary Wharf and the City of London. First opened on 31 August 1987, the DLR has been extended multiple times, giving a total route length of 38 km (24 miles). Lines now reach north to Stratford, south to Lewisham, west to Tower Gateway and Bank in the City of London financial district, and east to Beckton, London City Airport and Woolwich Arsenal. An extension to Thamesmead is currently being proposed.

Normal operations are automated, so there is minimal staffing on the 149 trains (which have no driving cabs) and at major interchange stations; the four below-ground stations are staffed, to comply with health and safety regulations for underground stations. The DLR was one of the first major railway infrastructure projects in Britain where access for disabled people was considered, with level access into the train from platforms and lifts at all stations.

The DLR is operated and maintained by franchisee KeolisAmey (a joint venture of transport company Keolis and infrastructure support provider Amey) for Transport for London (TfL). Passenger numbers have increased as the network has expanded since its launch, with 50 million passenger journeys a year by 2004, and more than 100 million in 2013. In the financial year 2024/25, there were 97.8 million passenger journeys.

== History ==
=== Background ===
In the 18th and 19th century, new docks were built east of the City of London to cater for the rapidly growing city. The last of these docks opened in 1921 in the Royal Docks. From the early 1960s, the docks began to decline as cargo was containerised and mechanised. The older docks did not have space to expand, and could not handle larger vessels. The docks had been connected to the national railway network via the London and Blackwall Railway (L&BR), which was closed in 1966 for lack of traffic. From the mid-1960s, the docks gradually closed down, leading to major job losses and economic deprivation. In the 1970s, the opening of new deep water Tilbury container docks located further east in Essex exacerbated the issue, with the Royal Docks closing in 1981.

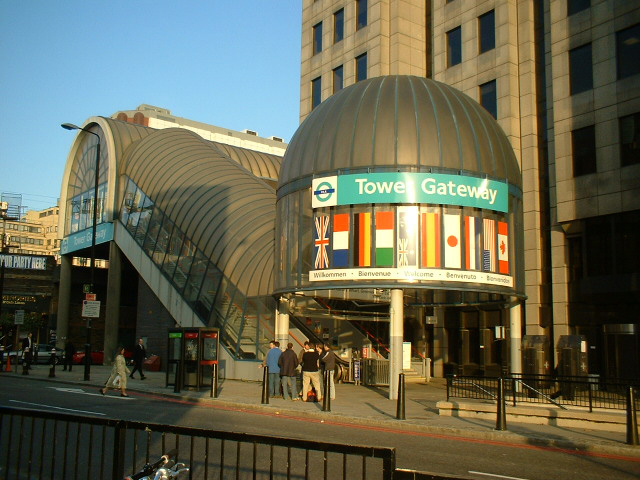
Tower Gateway DLR station was the DLR's original link to central London.

=== Origins and development ===
Throughout the 1970s, the government and the Greater London Council (GLC) put forward various plans to redevelop the Docklands area. The area was thought to have great potential for redevelopment, located close to the City of London with historic warehouses and large areas of water.

In 1972, the London Docklands Study team commissioned Travis Morgan & Partners to propose redevelopment of the area. In 1973, they proposed, among other recommendations, that a "minitram" people-mover system capable of carrying up to 20 people in each unit should be constructed to connect the Docklands with the planned Fleet line tube railway terminus at Fenchurch Street railway station. The Greater London Council formed a Docklands Joint Committee with the Boroughs of Greenwich, Lewisham, Newham, Southwark and Tower Hamlets in 1974 to undertake the redevelopment of the area. A light railway system was envisaged, terminating either at Tower Hill tube station or at nearby Fenchurch Street, but both options were seen as too expensive.

Nonetheless, in 1976 another report proposed a conventional tube railway for the area and London Transport obtained legal powers in an act of Parliament to build a line from Charing Cross station to Fenchurch Street, Surrey Docks (now Surrey Quays railway station), the Isle of Dogs, North Greenwich and Custom House to Woolwich Arsenal. This was intended to be the second stage of the Fleet line – which had been renamed the Jubilee line, the first stage of which opened in 1979 from Stanmore to Charing Cross. This would have cost around £325 million. However, when the Thatcher government came to power, the plans to extend the Jubilee line were halted and the new government insisted that a lower-cost option should be pursued.

In July 1981, the government established the London Docklands Development Corporation (LDDC) to coordinate the redevelopment of the Docklands. The need to provide a cheap public transport solution led to it commissioning London Transport to evaluate a number of exclusively light rail options, using trams or tram like vehicles. The cost of extending the Jubilee line to the area was now estimated to be around £450 million.

The core of the route ran alongside the Great Eastern line out of London and south along the former London & Blackwall Railway line through the Isle of Dogs. Three terminus options were proposed at the west end, at Tower Hill, Minories and Aldgate East. The Tower Hill option would have required a low-level interchange to be constructed alongside the existing Underground station, but this would have been a very costly venture. The Minories option, a high-level station virtually on the site of the old Minories railway station, was selected and became the current Tower Gateway DLR terminus. Aldgate East would have been perhaps the most ambitious of all of the options, as it originally envisaged a low-level connection with the District line that would have allowed DLR trains to run on London Underground tracks to a variety of central London destinations. However, it quickly became apparent that there was no capacity on the existing network for integrating the DLR into the Underground.

Two southern terminus options were put forward, at Cubitt Town (today's Island Gardens station) and Tiller Road, on the west side of Millwall Dock, with two possible routes to reach them. A "western" route would have run from the Westferry station alongside West Ferry Road via Cuba Street, then either terminating at Tiller Road or continuing over Millwall Docks Cut to a terminus at Cubitt Town. The "central" option required the West India Docks to be infilled or bridged and would run down the middle of the peninsula, through what was at the time an area of derelict warehouses. Ultimately this latter option was chosen, though the 1981 London Transport report warned that without extensive development around Canary Wharf the area would be "very isolated with poor traffic prospects" – as indeed it was, for a number of years.

The northern terminus was proposed at Mile End, with options including street running down Burdett Road towards Limehouse or along the Mile End Road to turn south before using an old railway alignment to reach Poplar.

A final report – prepared by the GLC, LDDC, government departments and London Transport – was published in June 1982, proposing a north–south route from Mile End to the Isle of Dogs, and an east–west route linking the Isle of Dogs to the City of London. Even during the development of the line, proposals for future extensions were being envisaged and investigated.

=== Parliamentary process and construction ===
Following the publishing of the report, the Departments of the Environment and Transport agreed to provide £77 million towards construction of the extension, with a deadline of 1987. The funding agreement also included conditions to maximise the use of modern technology, and that no ongoing subsidy would be available from government.

Initially, the system was planned to be manually operated and having some stretches of street running. During the Parliamentary process, the northern terminus of the line was changed to Stratford, as part of efforts to segregate the line from road and other railway traffic, as the LDDC were pushing for the line to use a "high tech automated system". In 1984, the contract for the initial system was awarded to a GEC / John Mowlem joint venture, which proposed fully automated operation using light rail vehicles.

The two Acts of Parliament that authorised the line to be built were passed in 1984 and 1985. Construction of the system began shortly after in 1985, with the joint venture careful to minimise costs in light of the £77 million budget. Two thirds of the route was built on underused or disused railway infrastructure, and station architecture used a kit-of-parts approach to save money.

=== Initial system (1987–1990) ===
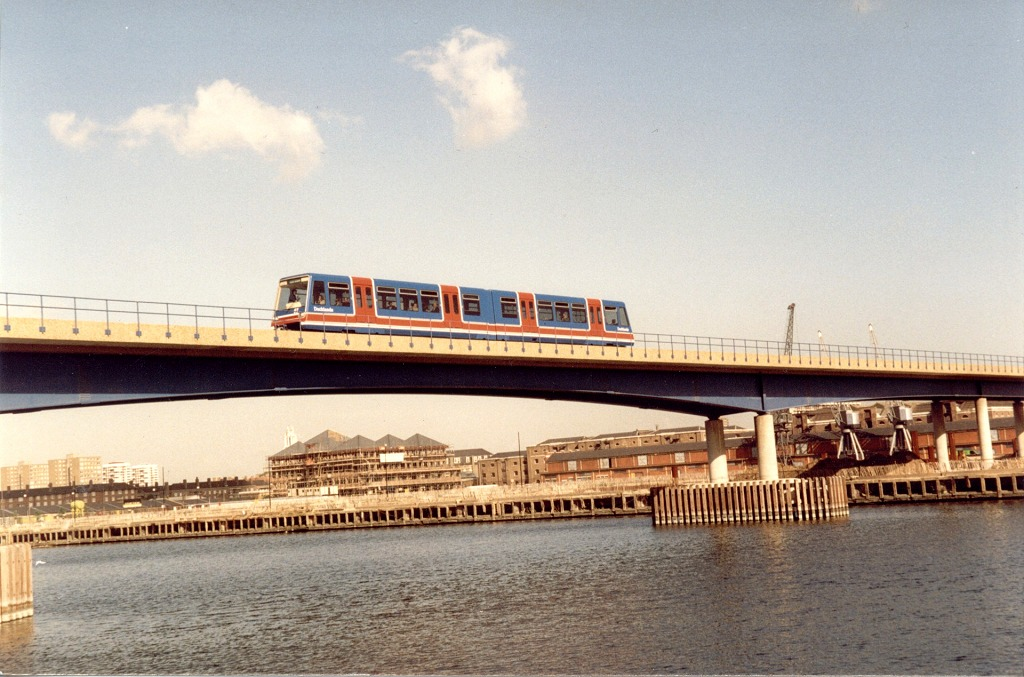
A first-generation DLR train crosses West India Dock in 1987.

The railway was formally opened by Queen Elizabeth II on 30 July 1987, and passenger services began on 31 August. The initial system comprised two routes, from Tower Gateway and Stratford to Island Gardens, with a total length of 12.1 km (7.5 miles). It was mainly elevated on disused railway viaducts or new concrete viaducts, and adopted disused surface railway formations between Poplar and Stratford. The trains were fully automated, controlled by computer, and had no driver; a Passenger Service Agent (PSA) on each train, originally referred to as a "Train Captain", was responsible for patrolling the train, checking tickets, making announcements and controlling the doors. PSAs could take control of the train in circumstances including equipment failure and emergencies. A total of eleven P86 stock units supplied by Linke-Hofmann-Busch comprised the first generation of train.

The system was lightweight, with stations designed for trains of only a single articulated vehicle. The three branches totalled 13 km (8.1 miles), had 15 stations, and were connected by a flat triangular junction near Poplar. Services ran from Tower Gateway to Island Gardens and from Stratford to Island Gardens; the north side of the junction was used only for access to the Poplar depot. The stations were mostly of a common design and constructed from standard components. A common feature was a short half-cylindrical glazed blue canopy. All stations were above ground and were generally unstaffed. All stations featured lifts and level access into the train from platforms.

=== Extensions to the City and the Royal Docks (1991–1994) ===
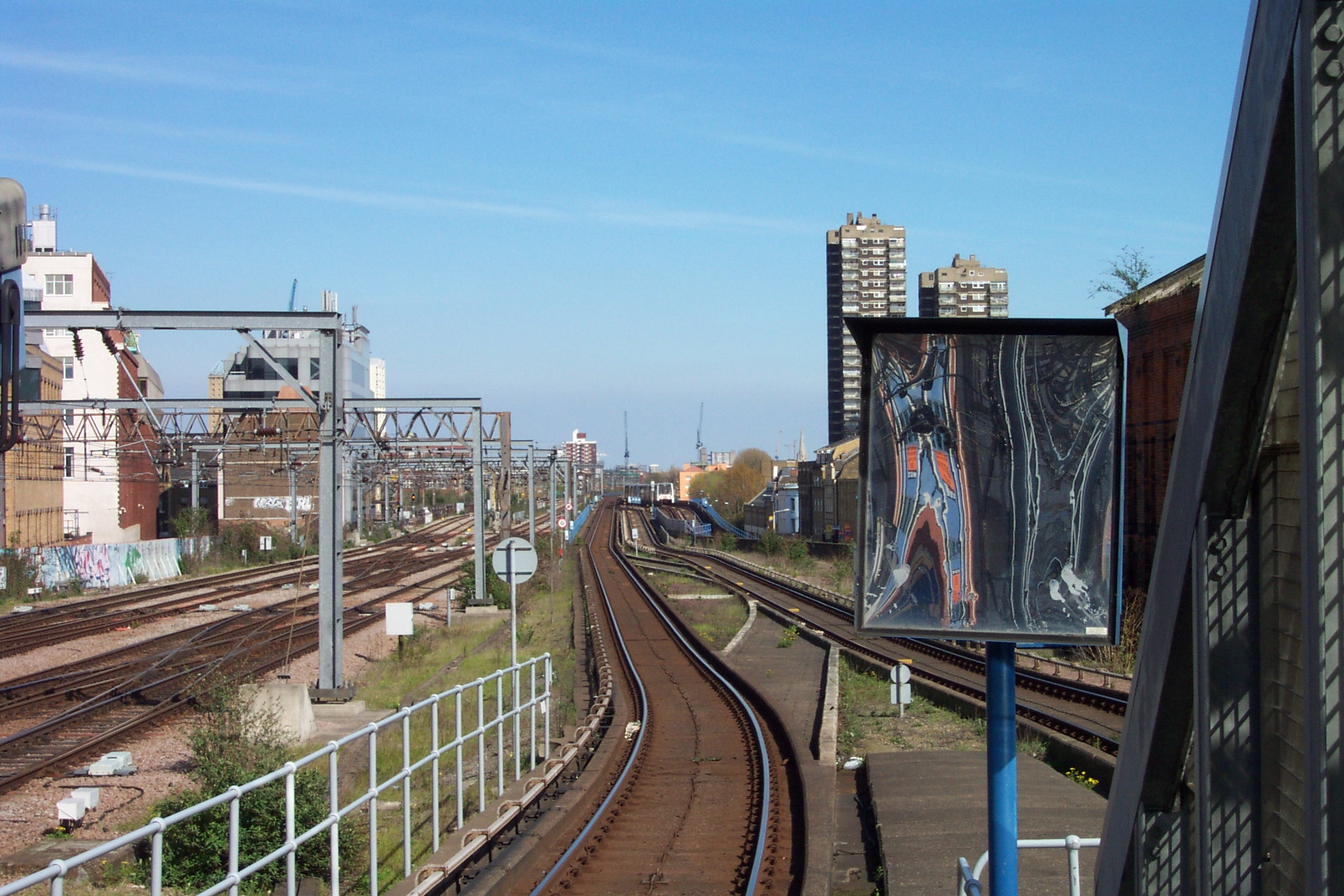
The view from Tower Gateway looking east prior to rebuilding shows Fenchurch Street approach tracks to the left and the DLR line in the centre. Just visible in the distance is a DLR train that has emerged from the tunnel to Bank to the right.

The initial system had a relatively low capacity, but the Docklands area very quickly developed into a major financial centre and employment zone, increasing traffic. In particular Tower Gateway, at the edge of the City of London, attracted criticism for its poor connections, as it did not connect directly with the nearby Tower Hill tube station or Fenchurch Street railway station. The criticism arose partly because the system usage was higher than expected. Plans were developed, before the system opened, to extend it to Bank in the west and Beckton in the east. Additional trains were purchased (P89 stock), stations were extended to two-unit length, and the system was expanded into the heart of the City of London to Bank through a tunnel, which opened in 1991 at a cost of £295 million. This extension left Tower Gateway on a stub.

As the Canary Wharf office complex grew, Canary Wharf DLR station was redeveloped from a small wayside station to a large one with six platforms serving three tracks and a large overall roof, fully integrated into the malls below the office towers.

The east of Docklands needed better transport connections to encourage development, and a fourth branch, towards Beckton, was planned, with several route options available. A route from Poplar via Canning Town and the north side of the Royal Docks complex was chosen, and opened in March 1994 at a cost of £280 million. Initially it was thought the line was likely to be underutilised, due to the sparse development in the area and for this reason two additional stations at Thames Wharf (not to be confused with the later Thames Wharf proposal on the Woolwich branch) and Connaught were omitted. As part of this extension, one side of the original flat triangular junction was replaced by a grade-separated junction west of Poplar. Poplar was rebuilt to give cross-platform interchange between the Stratford and Beckton lines, with a new grade-separated junction built east of the station at the divergence of the Stratford and Beckton lines. As part of the extension, a new, larger, depot was built at Beckton. Owing to various issues with the P86 and P89 trains (including non-compliance with fire safety standards required for underground operation, low capacity, inability to be coupled in pairs and issues with the signalling system), a replacement fleet of trains and a new signalling system from Alcatel SelTrac was installed.

=== Extension to Greenwich & Lewisham (1996–1999) ===
Early on, Lewisham London Borough Council commissioned a feasibility study into extending the system under the River Thames. This led the council to advocate an extension via Greenwich and Deptford, terminating at Lewisham railway station. The ambitions of the operators were supported by politicians in Parliament, including the future Labour Deputy Prime Minister John Prescott, and Lord Whitty. The extension would be designed, built, financed and maintained by a private consortium as a Private finance initiative, with Government contributing around £50 million of the £200 million construction cost.

Construction began in 1996, with the extension opening ahead of schedule on 20 November 1999. It left the Island Gardens route south of the Crossharbour turn-back sidings, and dropped gently to Mudchute, where a street-level station replaced the high-level one on the former London & Blackwall Railway viaduct. The line then entered a tunnel, following the route of the viaduct to a shallow subsurface station at Island Gardens, accessible by stairs or a lift. It crossed under the Thames to Cutty Sark in the centre of Greenwich, and surfaced at Greenwich railway station, with cross-platform interchange between the northbound track and the London-bound main line. The line snaked on a concrete viaduct to Deptford Bridge, before descending to Elverson Road at street level, close to Lewisham town centre, terminating in two platforms between and below the main-line platforms at Lewisham railway station, with buses stopping outside the station. The extension quickly proved profitable.

=== Extensions to London City Airport & Woolwich (2004–2009) ===
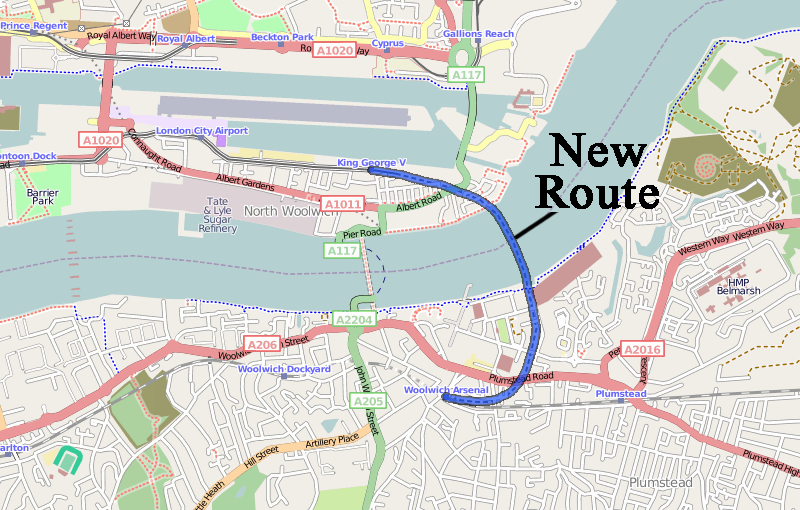
Route of the Woolwich Arsenal extension

An extension to London City Airport from the existing Beckton branch was explored in the mid-1990s, at first via travelator from Royal Albert, and then in 1998 via a proposed lift-bridge over the dock with an intermediate station at West Silvertown. The government initially supported this proposal, and in 1999 was developed to the route known today with a further extension to King George V. At this time, the further route to Woolwich Arsenal was developed with an intermediate station at Woolwich Reach, but was viewed as a longer-term aspiration. The Woolwich Reach station (on the south bank of the Thames, at the site of the Marlborough Road ventilation and escape shaft), was descoped in 2000.

The extension was aided by a five-year programme of investment for public transport across London that was unveiled by Mayor of London Ken Livingstone on 12 October 2004. On 2 December 2005, an eastward branch along the approximate route of the former Eastern Counties and Thames Junction Railway on the southern side of the Royal Docks complex opened from Canning Town to King George V via London City Airport.

A further extension from King George V to Woolwich Arsenal opened on 10 January 2009, providing interchange with National Rail services. The extension again used Private Finance Initiative funding, with construction beginning in June 2005, the same month that the contracts were finalised. The tunnels under the Thames were completed on 23 July 2007, and formally opened by Boris Johnson, Mayor of London on 12 January 2009. Following completion, the project was shortlisted for the 2009 Prime Minister's Better Public Building Award.

The original Tower Gateway station was closed in mid-2008 for complete reconstruction. The two terminal tracks either side of a narrow island platform were replaced by a single track between two platforms, one for arriving passengers and the other for departing (Spanish solution). It reopened on 2 March 2009.

As part of an upgrade to allow three-car trains, strengthening work was necessary at the Delta Junction north of West India Quay. It was decided to include this in a plan for further grade separation to eliminate the conflict between services to Stratford and from Bank. A new timetable was introduced, with improved frequencies at peak hours. The new grade-separated route from Bank to Canary Wharf is used throughout the day, bypassing West India Quay station until mid-evening. Work on this project proceeded concurrently with the three-car upgrade work and the 'diveunder' (sometimes referred to as a flyunder but DLR have coined the term in this instance 'diveunder'), and the improved timetable came into use on 24 August 2009.

=== Upgrade to three-car trains (2007–2011) ===
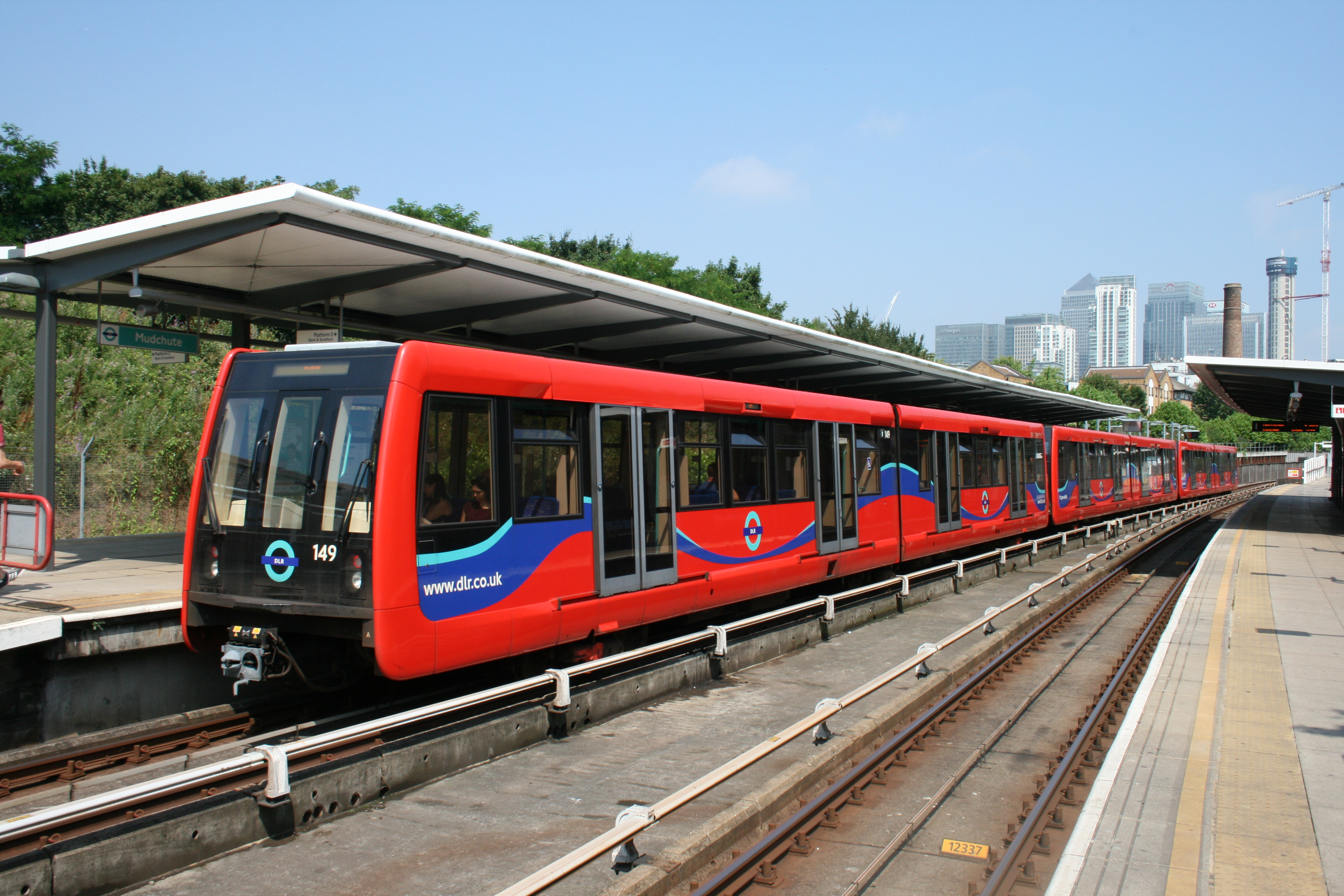
Three-car trains began running on the DLR from February 2010

With the development of the eastern Docklands as part of the Thames Gateway initiative and London's staging of the Olympic and Paralympic Games in 2012, several extensions and enhancements were undertaken.

Capacity was increased by upgrading trains to use three cars. The alternative of more frequent trains was rejected as the signalling changes needed would have cost no less than upgrading to longer trains and with fewer benefits. The railway had been built for single-car operation, and the upgrade required both strengthening viaducts to take heavier trains and lengthening many platforms. The extra capacity was useful for the Olympic and Paralympic Games in 2012, which increased the use of London's transport network. 55 additional trains were purchased to increase capacity on the network and allow for three-car operation.

Elverson Road, Royal Albert, Gallions Reach and Cutty Sark have not been extended for three-car trains; such extension may be impossible in some cases. Selective door operation is used, with emergency walkways in case a door fails to remain shut. Cutty Sark station is underground, and both costs and the risk to nearby historic buildings prevent platform extension. The tunnel has an emergency walkway. Additional work beyond that needed to take the three-car trains was also carried out at some stations. This included replacing canopies with more substantial ones along the full platform length. A new South Quay station has been built 200 m (660 ft) east of the former location as nearby curves precluded lengthening. Mudchute now has a third platform.

The works were originally planned as three phases: Bank-Lewisham, Poplar-Stratford, and the Beckton branch. The original £200 million contract was awarded on 3 May 2007. Work started in 2007 and Bank-Lewisham was originally due to be completed in 2009. However, the work programme for the first two phases was merged and the infrastructure work was completed by the end of January 2010. The Lewisham-Bank route now runs three-car trains exclusively. They started running on the Beckton branch on 9 May 2011. Stratford to Lewisham and Bank to Woolwich Arsenal services sometimes operate as three-car trains; other routes run the longer trains when required.

=== Extension to Stratford International (2011) ===
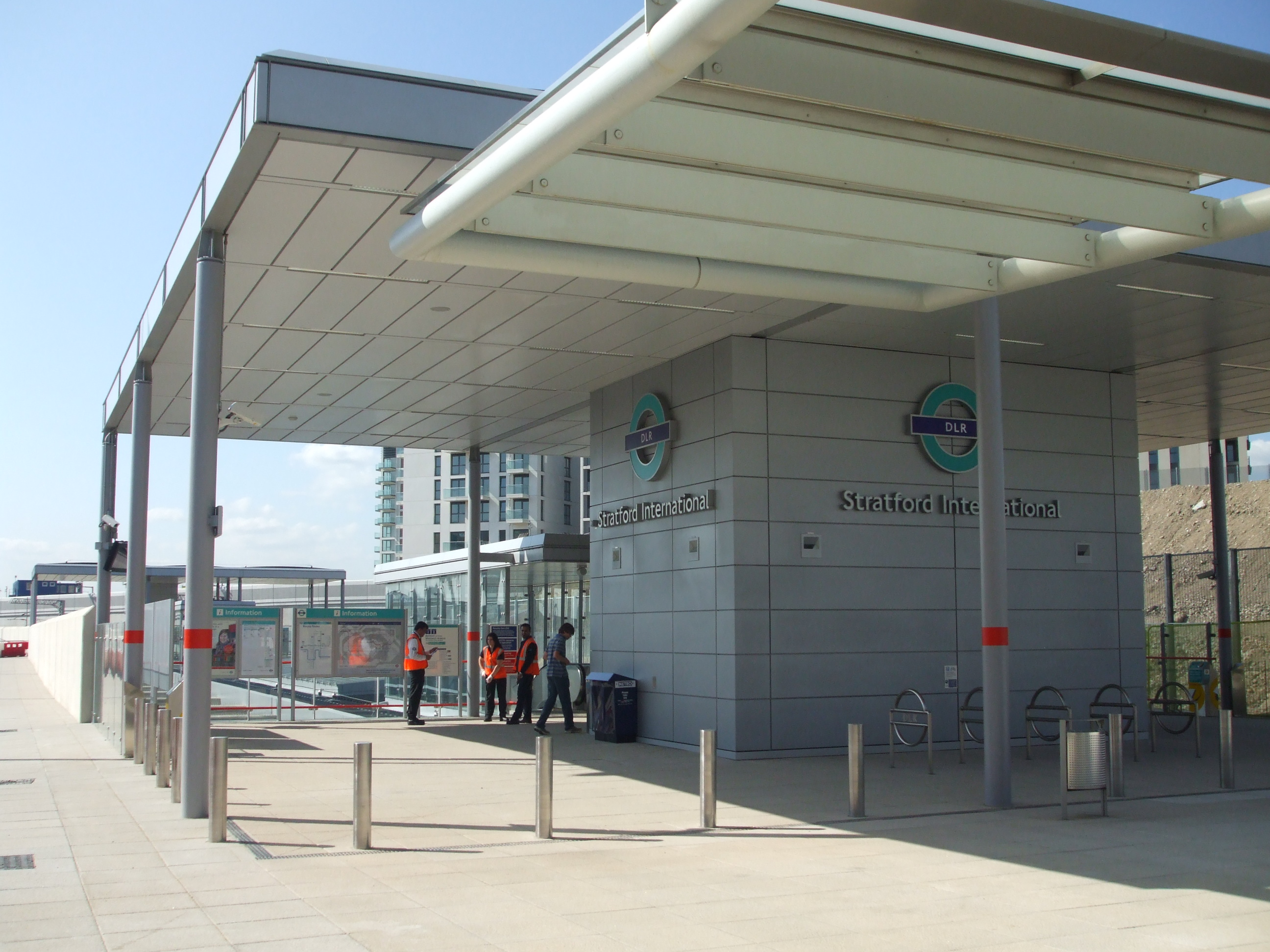
The Stratford International DLR forecourt, soon after opening in 2011

In addition to the three-car station extensions, partly funded from the 2012 Olympics budget, a line was opened from Canning Town to Stratford and Stratford International railway station along the former North London line of the national railway system, with additional stations. It parallels the London Underground Jubilee line for much of its length. The extension to Stratford International, taking over the North London line from Canning Town to Stratford, links the Docklands area with domestic high-speed services on High Speed 1. It was an important part of transport improvements for the Olympic and Paralympic Games in 2012, much of which were held on a site adjoining Stratford International.

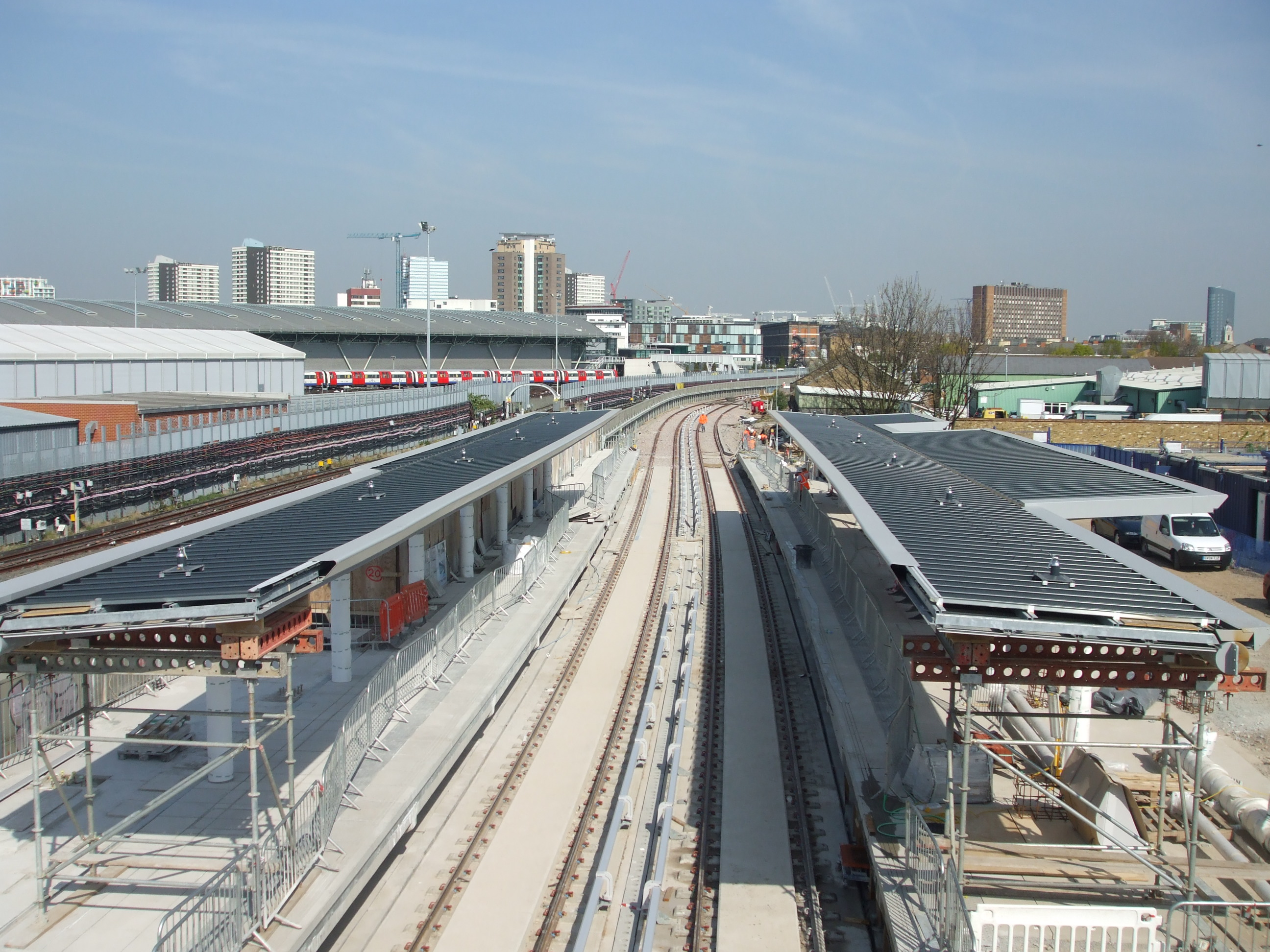
Abbey Road under construction in 2010

The first contract for construction work was awarded on 10 January 2007 and construction started in mid-2007. Originally scheduled to open in mid-2010, the line opened on 31 August 2011. On 11 November 2015 the Mayor of London announced that all stations on this line would be rezoned from zone 3 to zone 2/3.

New stations were Canning Town, Star Lane, West Ham, Abbey Road, Stratford High Street and Stratford International. Of these, Canning Town, West Ham and Stratford are former North London Line stations, and Stratford High Street was built on the site of Stratford Market railway station. From Canning Town to Stratford the extension runs parallel to the Jubilee line of the London Underground. As well as providing interchange with the adjacent Jubilee line stations, there are additional DLR stations at Star Lane, Abbey Road and Stratford High Street. At Stratford new platforms were built for the North London Line at the northern end of the station. The old platforms (formerly 1 and 2) adjacent to the Jubilee line were rebuilt for the DLR, renumbered 16 (towards Stratford International) and 17 (towards Beckton/Woolwich Arsenal). Interchange between the Stratford International branch and DLR trains via Poplar is possible although the platforms are widely separated and at different levels. There is no physical connection between the two branches.

=== Relocation of Pudding Mill Lane station (2014) ===
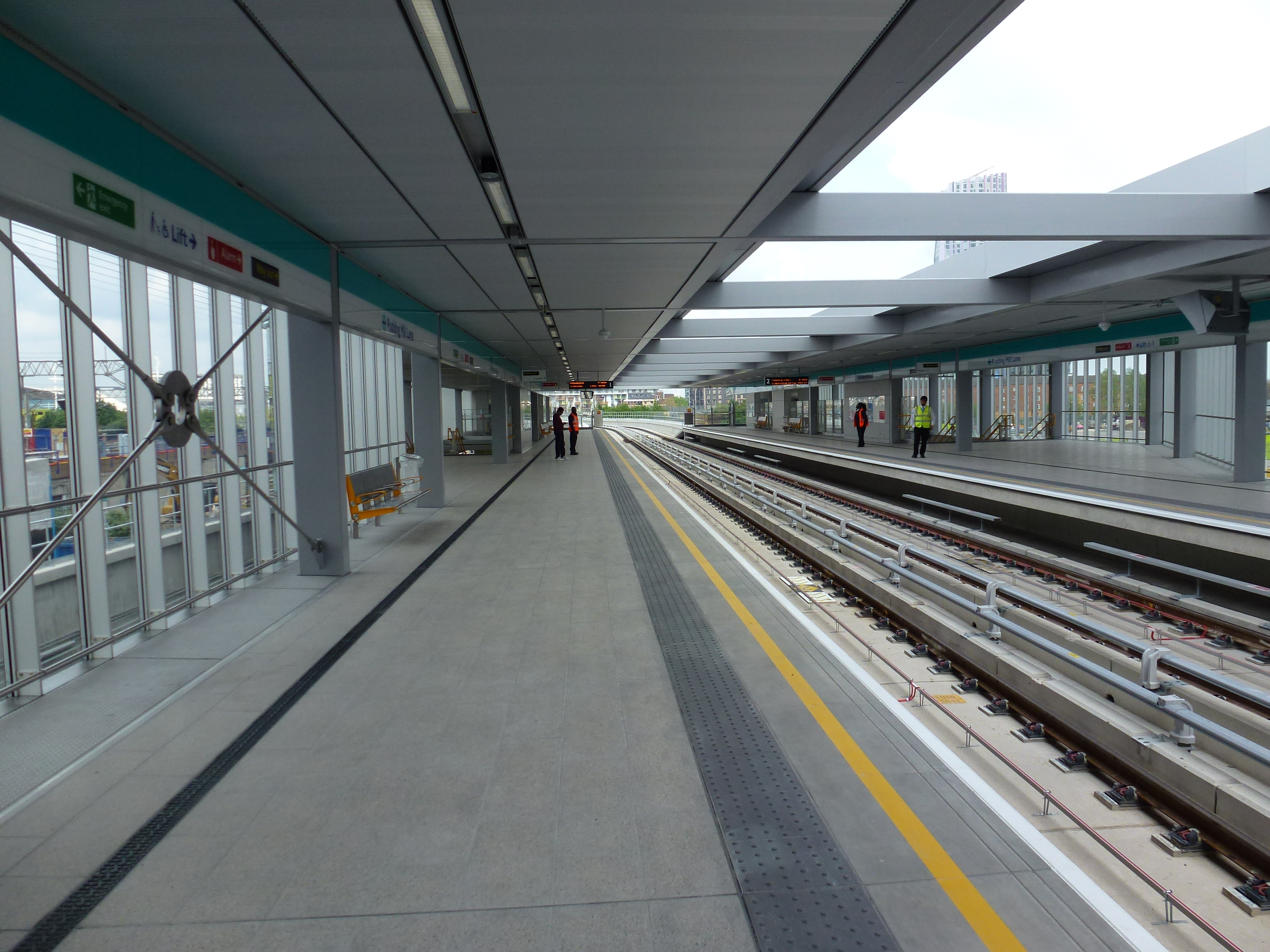
The resited Pudding Mill Lane features new, wider platforms.

One of the tunnel portals for Elizabeth line is on the original site of Pudding Mill Lane station. As a consequence, work was carried out to divert the DLR between City Mill River and the River Lea onto a new viaduct further south. This included a replacement station, which opened on 28 April 2014. The former station stood on the only significant section of single track on the system, between Bow Church and Stratford. The opportunity was taken to double the track in three stages, to improve capacity. There was originally no provision for works beyond the realigned section in the Crossrail Act.

== Current system ==
=== Network ===
The DLR has 38 km (24 miles) of tracks, with 45 stations. The three lines shown on the TfL DLR map have six branches: to Lewisham in the south, Stratford and Stratford International in the north, Beckton and Woolwich Arsenal in the east, and Central London in the west, splitting to Bank and Tower Gateway.

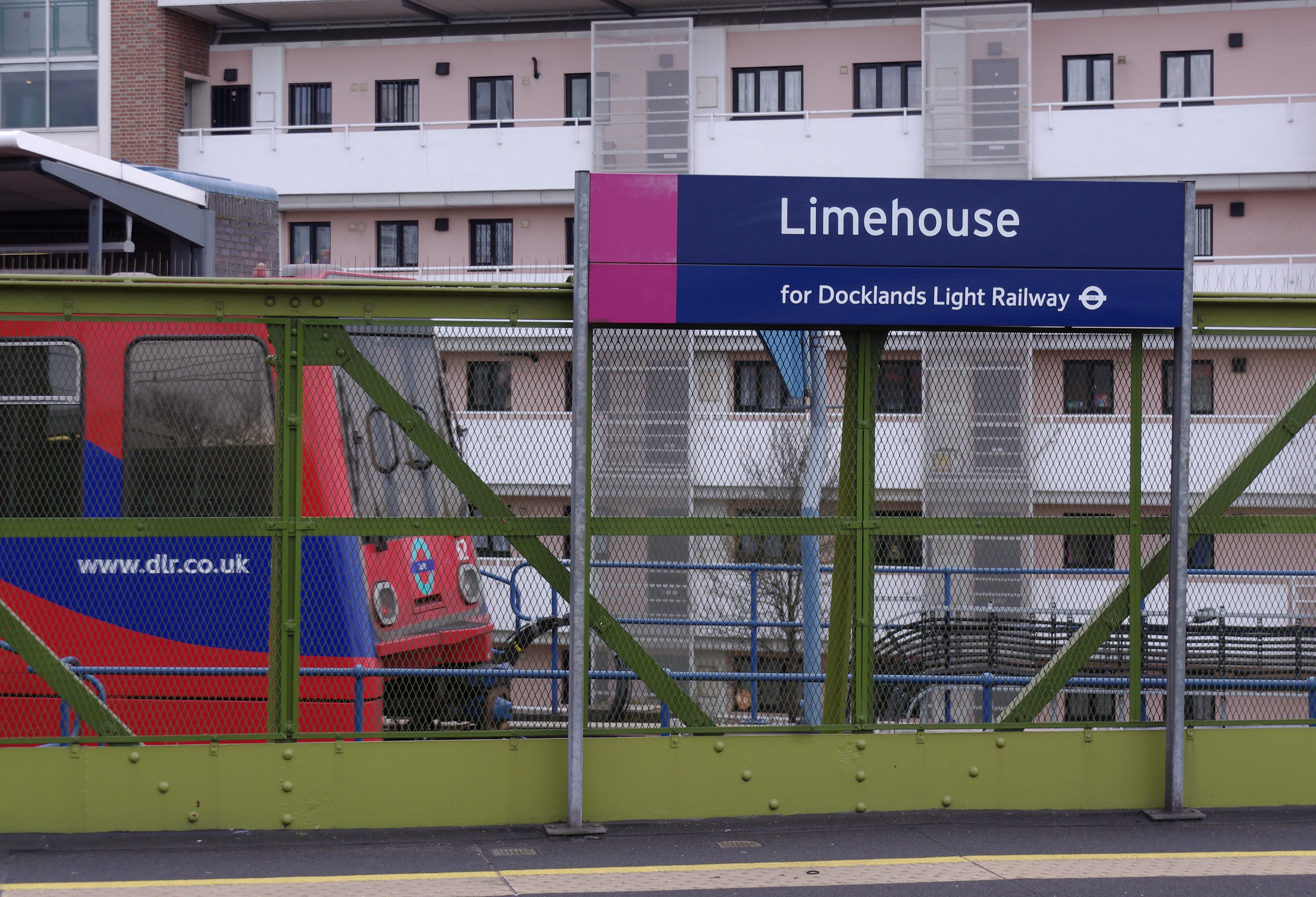
The London, Tilbury and Southend line (foreground), operated by c2c, runs alongside the DLR (behind the fence) from Limehouse to Tower Gateway.

The northern, southern and south-eastern branches terminate at the National Rail stations at Stratford, Stratford International, Lewisham and Woolwich Arsenal. Other interchanges with National Rail are at Limehouse, Greenwich and West Ham, while out-of-station interchanges for Oyster card holders are available between Shadwell DLR station and the Windrush line station of the same name, and between Fenchurch Street and the DLR's western termini of Tower Gateway and Bank.

Between Limehouse and Tower Gateway, the DLR runs parallel to the London, Tilbury and Southend line.

=== Map ===
Map

=== Services ===
The following services are operated in normal off-peak service from 26 September 2022:

Off-peak service
Route	Trains per hour	Calling at
Bank – Lewisham	12	Shadwell, Limehouse, Westferry, West India Quay (Bank-bound only), Canary Wharf, Heron Quays, South Quay, Crossharbour, Mudchute, Island Gardens, Cutty Sark for Maritime Greenwich, Greenwich, Deptford Bridge, Elverson Road
Bank – Woolwich Arsenal	6	Shadwell, Limehouse, Westferry, Poplar, Blackwall, East India, Canning Town, West Silvertown, Pontoon Dock, London City Airport, King George V
Tower Gateway – Beckton	6	Shadwell, Limehouse, Westferry, Poplar, Blackwall, East India, Canning Town, Royal Victoria, Custom House for ExCeL, Prince Regent, Royal Albert, Beckton Park, Cyprus, Gallions Reach
Canning Town – Beckton	6	Royal Victoria, Custom House, Prince Regent, Royal Albert, Beckton Park, Cyprus, Gallions Reach
Stratford – Canary Wharf	12	Pudding Mill Lane, Bow Church, Devons Road, Langdon Park, All Saints, Poplar, West India Quay
Stratford International – Woolwich Arsenal	6	Stratford, Stratford High Street, Abbey Road, West Ham, Star Lane, Canning Town, West Silvertown, Pontoon Dock, London City Airport, King George V

At peak times, these same services run, but with the frequency increased by 25 per cent. Additionally, in the morning peak, alternate Stratford – Canary Wharf services extend to Lewisham.

At terminal stations, trains reverse direction in the platforms, except at Bank where there is a reversing headshunt in the tunnel beyond the station. Trains can also turn back at Crossharbour and Mudchute - a facility used during service disruption or planned engineering work. There is also capability for an additional shuttle from Canning Town to Prince Regent when exhibitions are in progress at the ExCeL exhibition centre, although this is not supported by any additional turnback infrastructure. Trains serve every station on the route, but trains from Bank to Lewisham do not call at West India Quay because they are routed along the diveunder track to avoid junction conflicts. When required, such as during engineering works or for special events, other routes may be operated, such as Beckton to Lewisham if the Bank and Tower Gateway branch is closed.

=== Stations ===
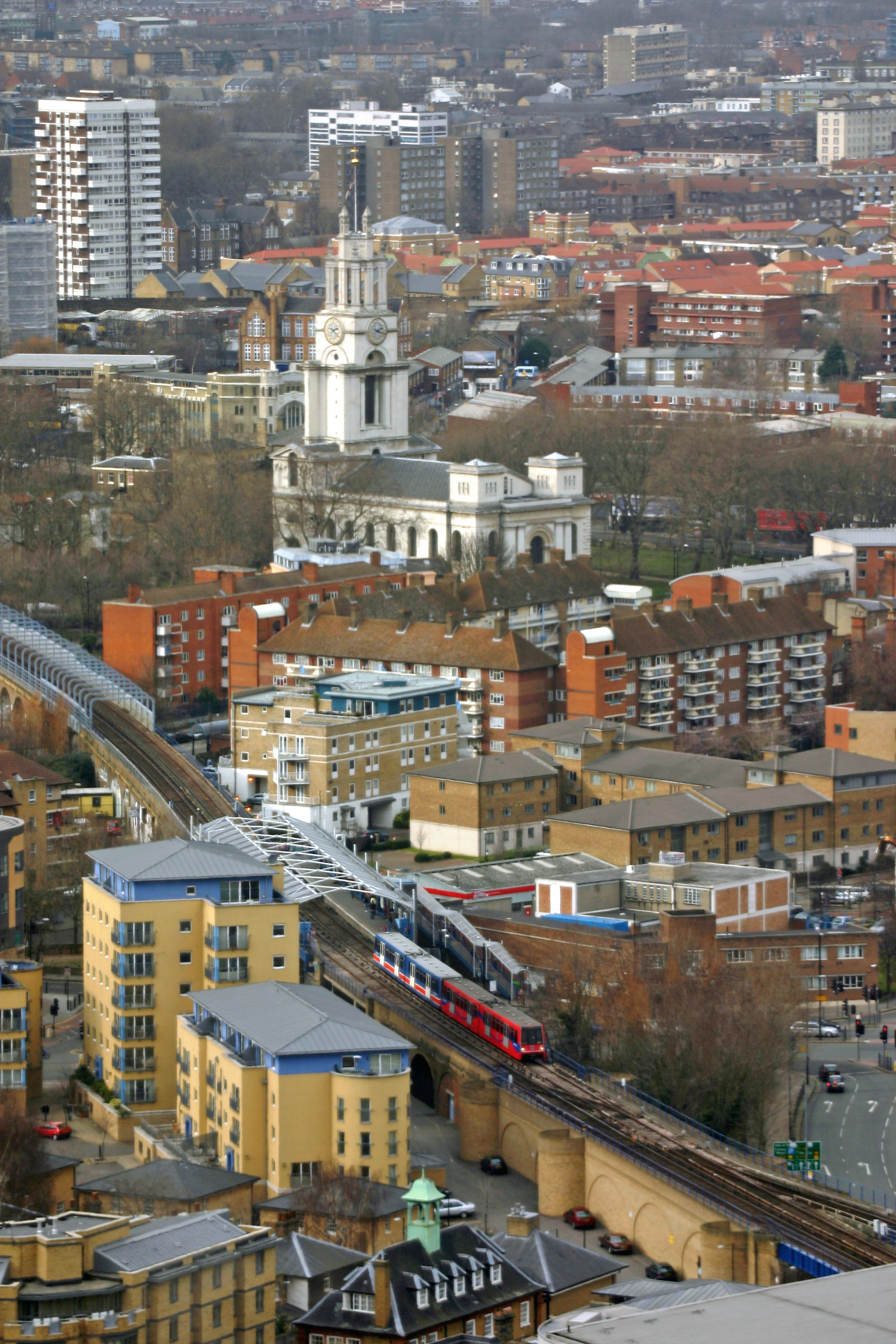
An eastbound train leaving Westferry Station

Most stations are elevated, with others at street level, in cutting or underground. Access to the platforms is mostly by staircase and lift, with escalators at some stations. From the outset the system has been fully accessible to wheelchairs; much attention was paid to quick and effective accessibility for all passengers. The station platforms match the floor height of the cars, giving level access for passengers with wheelchairs or pushchairs.

Most stations are of a modular design dating back to the initial system, extended and improved with two side platforms, each with separate access from the street, and platform canopies, although few examples remain of the original, distinctive rounded roof design. Stations are unstaffed, except the underground stations at Bank, Stratford International and Woolwich Arsenal for safety reasons, a few of the busier interchange stations, Canning Town, West Ham, and City Airport, which has a ticket office for passengers unfamiliar with the system. Canning Town, Custom House and Prince Regent are normally staffed on the platform whenever there is a significant exhibition at the ExCeL exhibition centre.

On 3 July 2007, DLR officially launched an art programme called DLR Art, similar to that on the London Underground, Art on the Underground. Alan Williams was appointed to produce the first temporary commission, called "Sidetrack", which portrays the ordinary and extraordinary sights, often unfamiliar to passengers, on the system and was displayed throughout the network.

=== Fares and ticketing ===
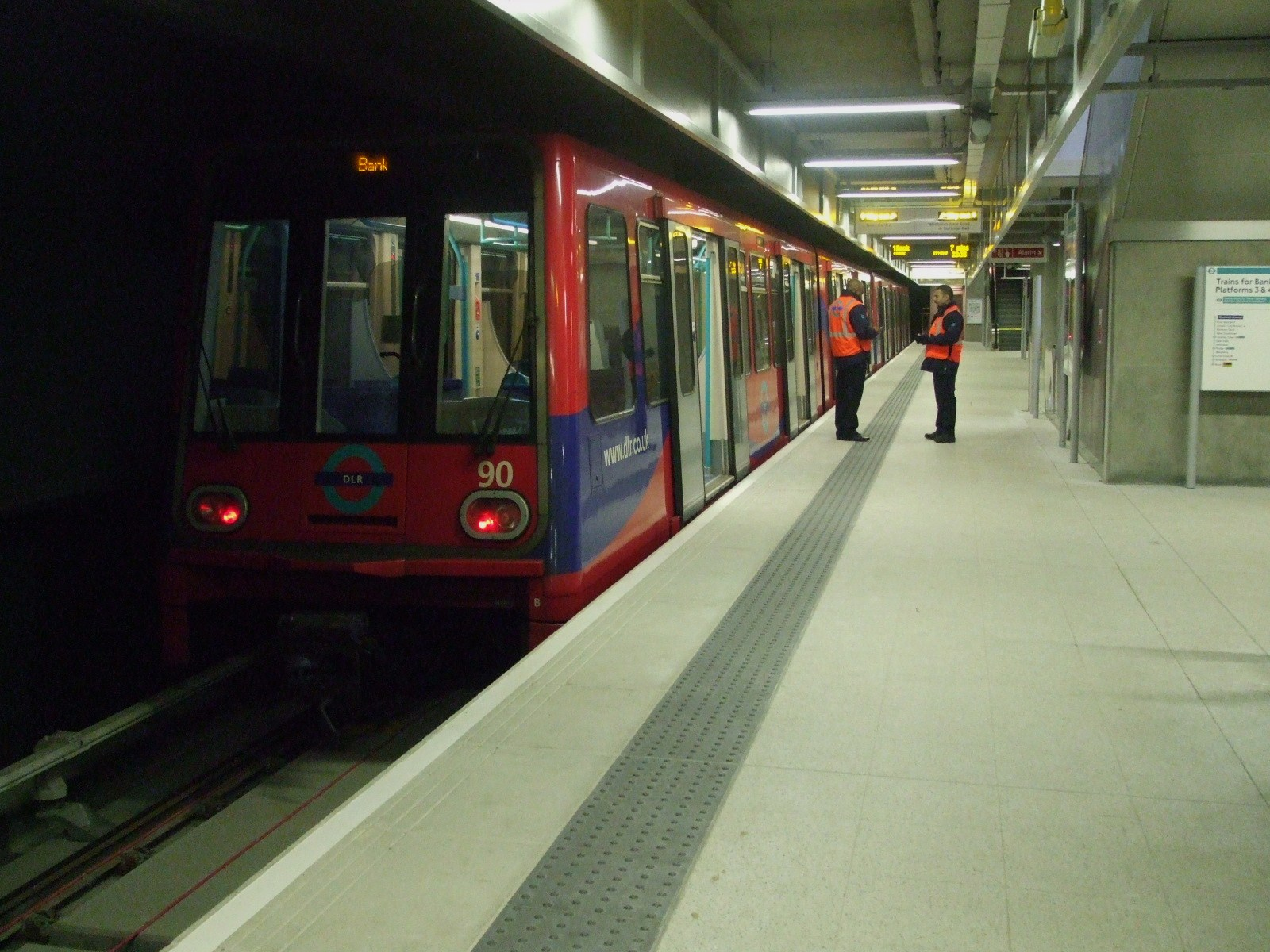
A train awaits departure from Woolwich Arsenal.

The system is part of the London fare zone system, and Travelcards that cover the appropriate zones are valid. Tickets can be purchased from ticket machines at the entrances to platforms, and are required before accessing the platform. Passengers using Oyster pay-as-you-go and contactless bank-cards need to touch both in and out of the system using card readers on automatic gates and platforms. There are no ticket barriers at DLR-only stations: correct ticketing is enforced by random on-train inspections by Passenger Service Agents (PSAs). There are barriers at Bank, Canning Town, West Ham and Stratford, where the DLR platforms are within a London Underground or National Rail barrier line. There are also ticket barriers at Woolwich Arsenal, which are the only barriers staffed by DLR staff; at this station passengers can pass between the DLR and Southeastern platforms within the paid area. Users of payment cards who have failed to touch in at the start of the journey, and other passengers without a correct ticket, may be liable to a £100 penalty fare or prosecution for fare evasion.

=== Electrification ===
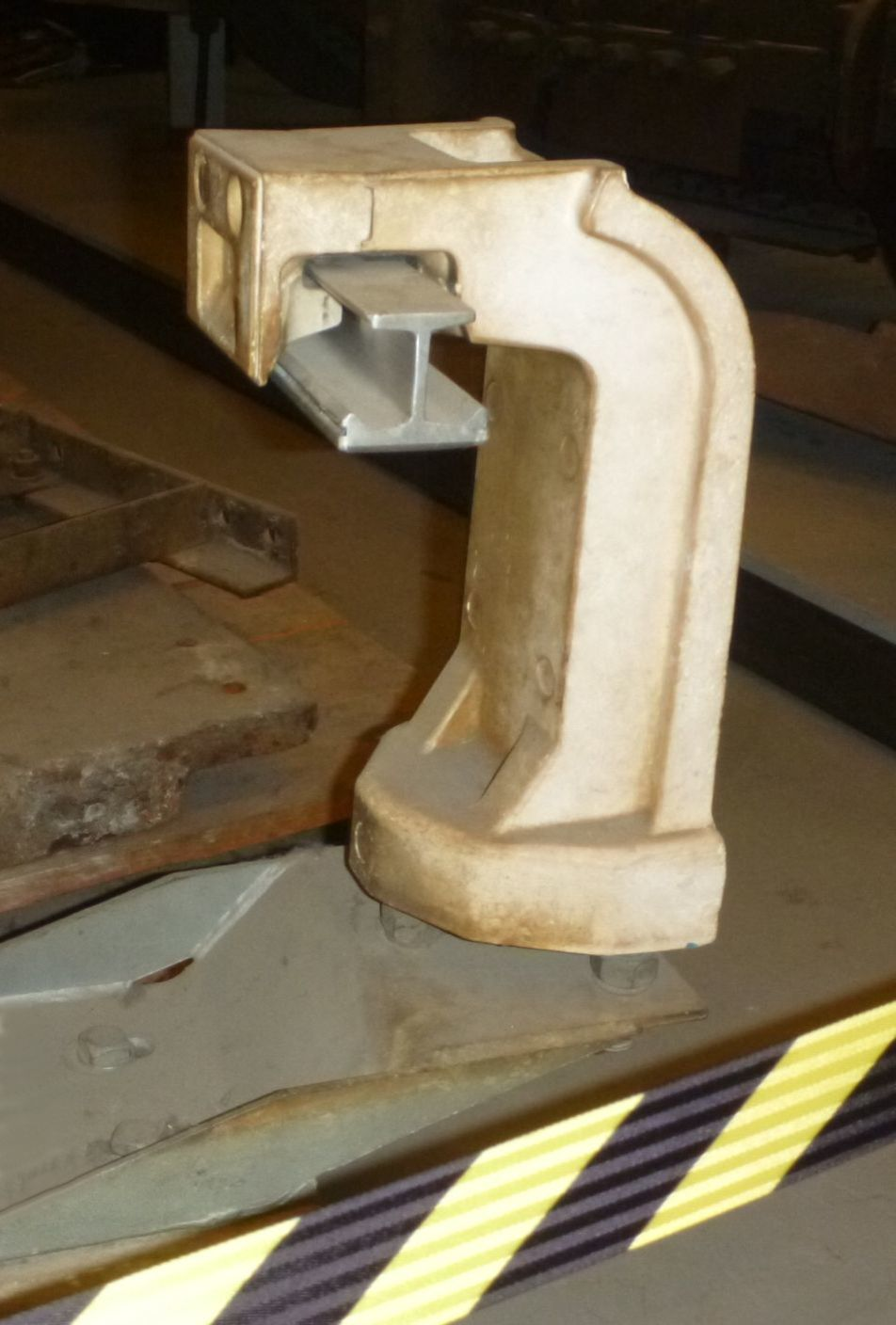
Support arm and short length of conductor rail

Traction power is provided at 750 V DC via a bottom-contact third rail system.

=== Signalling technology ===
Originally, the DLR used signalling based on a fixed-block technology developed by GEC-General Signal and General Railway Signal. This was replaced in 1994 with a moving-block TBTC (Transmission Based Train Control) system developed by Alcatel, called SelTrac. The SelTrac system was bought by Thales in 2007 and updates are provided by Thales Rail Signalling Solutions. The same technology is used by rapid transit systems including Vancouver's SkyTrain, the San Francisco Municipal Railway and Hong Kong's MTR. The SelTrac S40 system has also been adopted by the London Underground Jubilee line and Northern line. Transmissions occur via an inductive loop cable between each train's Vehicle On-Board Controller (VOBC) and the control centre (VCC, SMC) at Beckton. If this link is broken and communication is lost between the VOBC and VCC, SMC, the train stops until it is authorised to move again. If the whole system fails the train can run in restricted manual at 19 km/h (12 mph) for safety until the system is restored and communication is re-established. Emergency brakes can be applied if the train breaks the speed limit during manual control or overshoots a fixed stopping point, or if it leaves the station when the route has not been set. A secondary control centre is based at Poplar, the location of the original control centre, which can operate immediately should there be any issues with the primary at Beckton.

== Rolling stock ==
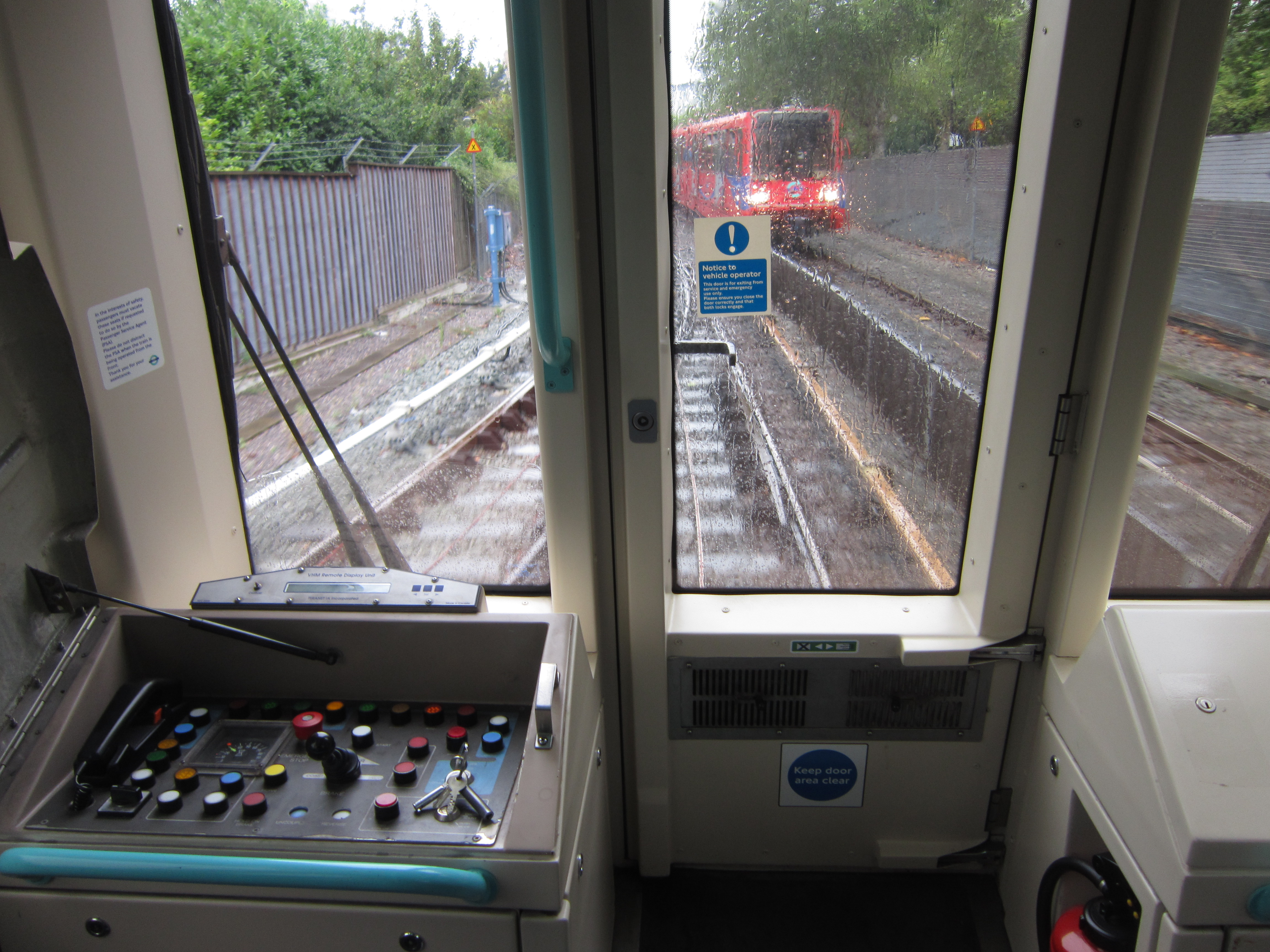
View from the front of a Docklands Light Railway train. The control panel is usually closed and locked.

The DLR is equipped with 149 high-floor bi-directional single-articulated electric multiple units (EMUs). DLR trains are highly automated, running segregated from traffic powered by a bottom-contact third rail. The automation system is a GoA3 driverless system, which requires a Passenger Service Agent (PSA) to manually open and close the doors and, when necessary, manually drive the train. Consoles at each door opening allow a PSA to control door closure and make announcements whilst patrolling the train. With the absence of a driver's position, the fully glazed car ends provide a forward and rear view for passengers.

Four generations of DLR train have been used – currently in use are the B90, B92 and B2K stock trains dating from the 1990s and early 2000s, and the B07 stock trains from the late 2000s. The B90/B92/B2K stock and the B07 stock form sets of two or three semi-permanently connected cars, the increase to three-car trains introduced on the busiest routes since 2010, following substantial platform extension works.

=== History ===
In the mid 1980s, 11 P86 stock trains, built by West German company Linke-Hofmann-Busch, were ordered by the GEC and Mowlem consortium building the DLR. These entered service in 1987 with the opening of the DLR. The car bodies were derived from a German Stadtbahnwagen B design, which was intended for use in light rail systems with sections of street running lines. 10 additional trains (P89 stock) were ordered from British Rail Engineering Limited (BREL) in the late 1980s. In the early 1990s, all P86 and P89 units were sold to the Essen Stadtbahn in Germany, following the decommissioning of the original signalling system in 1995.

Owing to various issues with the P86 and P89 trains (including non-compliance with fire safety standards required for underground operation, low capacity, inability to be coupled in pairs and issues with the signalling system), a replacement fleet was ordered from La Brugeoise et Nivelles (later Bombardier Transportation) and a new signalling system from Alcatel SelTrac as part of the Beckton extension of the DLR in the early 1990s. A total of 94 B90, B92 and B2K trains were built in three batches between 1991 and 2002 at Bombardier's factory in Bruges, Belgium. The B90, B92, and B2K stock trains are cosmetically and technologically identical, and can be operated interchangeably in trains of up to three sets.

In the mid-2000s, capacity on the DLR was increased with the extension of platforms to allow for three-car operation, with additional trains were also required to serve extensions to the network. Following London's successful bid in July 2005 to host the Olympic and Paralympic Games in 2012, additional trains would also be required. A total of 55 B07 stock trains were built by Bombardier in two batches in Germany between 2007 and 2009 at a cost of around £100 million, entering service by 2010. Use of three-car sets began in February 2010.

In the late 2010s, TfL ordered new trains from Construcciones y Auxiliar de Ferrocarriles (CAF) to replace the existing B90/B92/B2K stock and provide additional capacity on the network. Fifty-four B23 trains were built, entering service in 2025, but were removed from operation two months later due to braking issues. As of March 2026, the B23 fleet had not returned to service. Unlike the older fleet (which operates two or three trains coupled together), the B23 stock has fixed formation units with 5 walk-through coaches equivalent to the length of existing three-car trains – increasing capacity by 10%. The B23 stock features real-time digital information screens, air conditioning and mobile device charging points.

=== Current fleet ===
Class	Image	Type	Top speed		Cars built	Cars per train	Car length	In service
Class	Image	Type	mph	km/h	Cars built	Cars per train	Car length	In service
B90 Stock		EMU	50	80	23	2–3	28 m (91 ft 10 in)	1991–present
B92 Stock		EMU	50	80	47	2–3	28 m (91 ft 10 in)	1993–present
B2K Stock		EMU	50	80	24	2–3	28 m (91 ft 10 in)	2001–present
B07 Stock		EMU	50	80	55	2–3	28 m (91 ft 10 in)	2008–present
B23 Stock		EMU	50	80	54	5	86.7 m (284 ft 5 in)	2025, 2026–present

=== Past fleet ===
Class	Image	Type	Top speed		Cars built	Cars per train	Car length	In service	Notes
Class	Image	Type	mph	km/h	Cars built	Cars per train	Car length	In service	Notes
P86 Stock		EMU	50	80	11	2	28 m (91 ft 10 in)	1987–1995	Now in service on the Essen Stadtbahn
P89 Stock		EMU	50	80	10	2	28 m (91 ft 10 in)	1989–1995	Now in service on the Essen Stadtbahn

=== Depots and maintenance ===
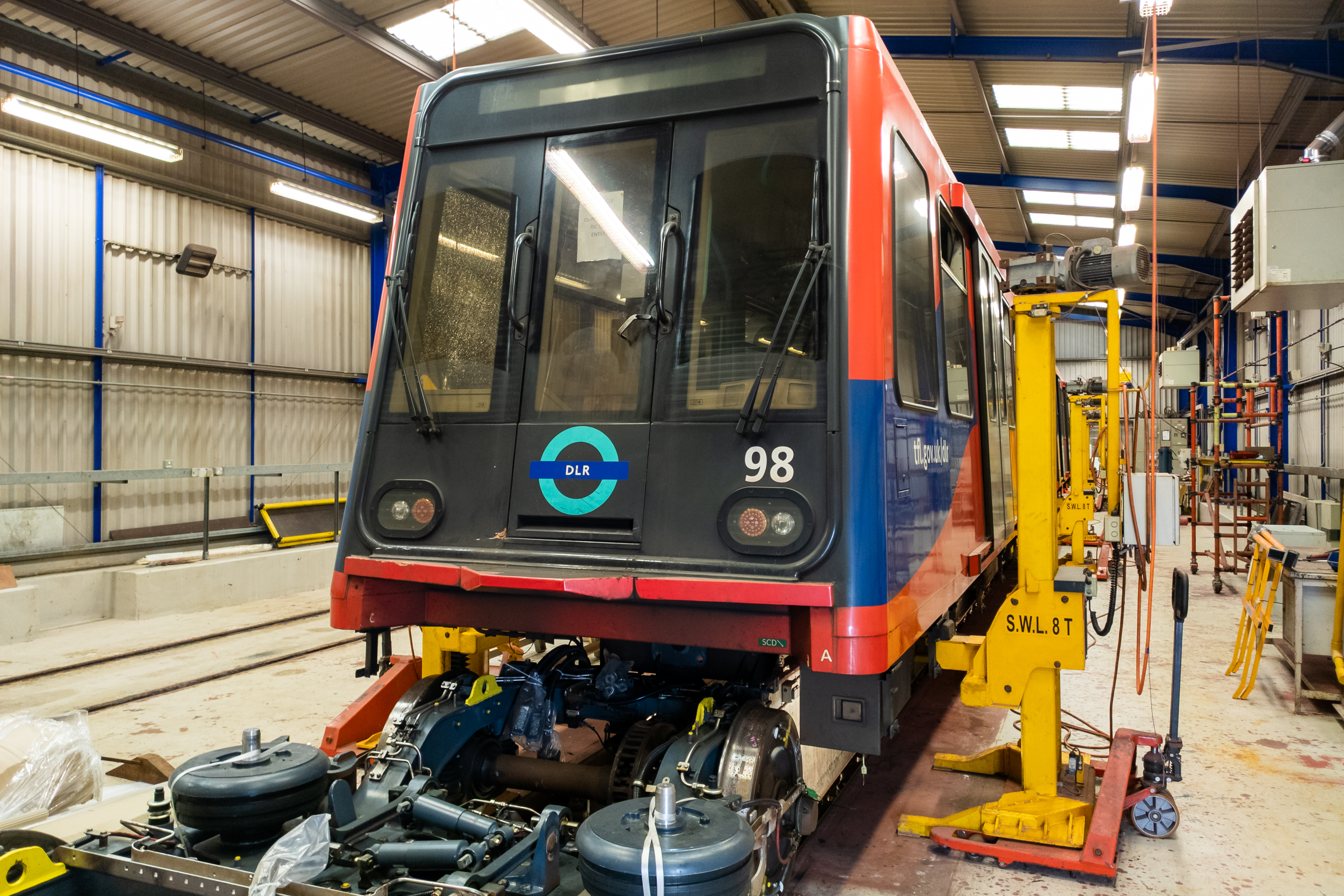
B2K Stock being maintained at Beckton Depot

The network has two depots, at Poplar and Beckton. Poplar was opened with the initial line in 1987. Owing to the constrained site, a new, larger, depot at Beckton was opened in 1994 – and is now the main maintenance depot and primary control centre for the network. Track maintenance, off-peak train stabling, as well as the TfL operating and maintenance centre and buildings for KeolisAmey Docklands franchise staff are based at Poplar. In addition to the passenger trains, the DLR also has a small fleet of specialist vehicles used for maintenance work.

Buckingham Group was awarded a £35 million contract in 2021 to upgrade the Beckton DLR depot to accommodate the new B23 rolling stock. Works include construction of a new carriage wash, extension and modification to existing track, and new sidings for the new trains. This was scheduled for completion in September 2023, but Buckingham went into administration the previous month (August 2023). TfL appointed Morgan Sindall to complete the work, alongside a £90 million deal to build a new train shed and deliver further sidings.

==== Non-passenger stock ====
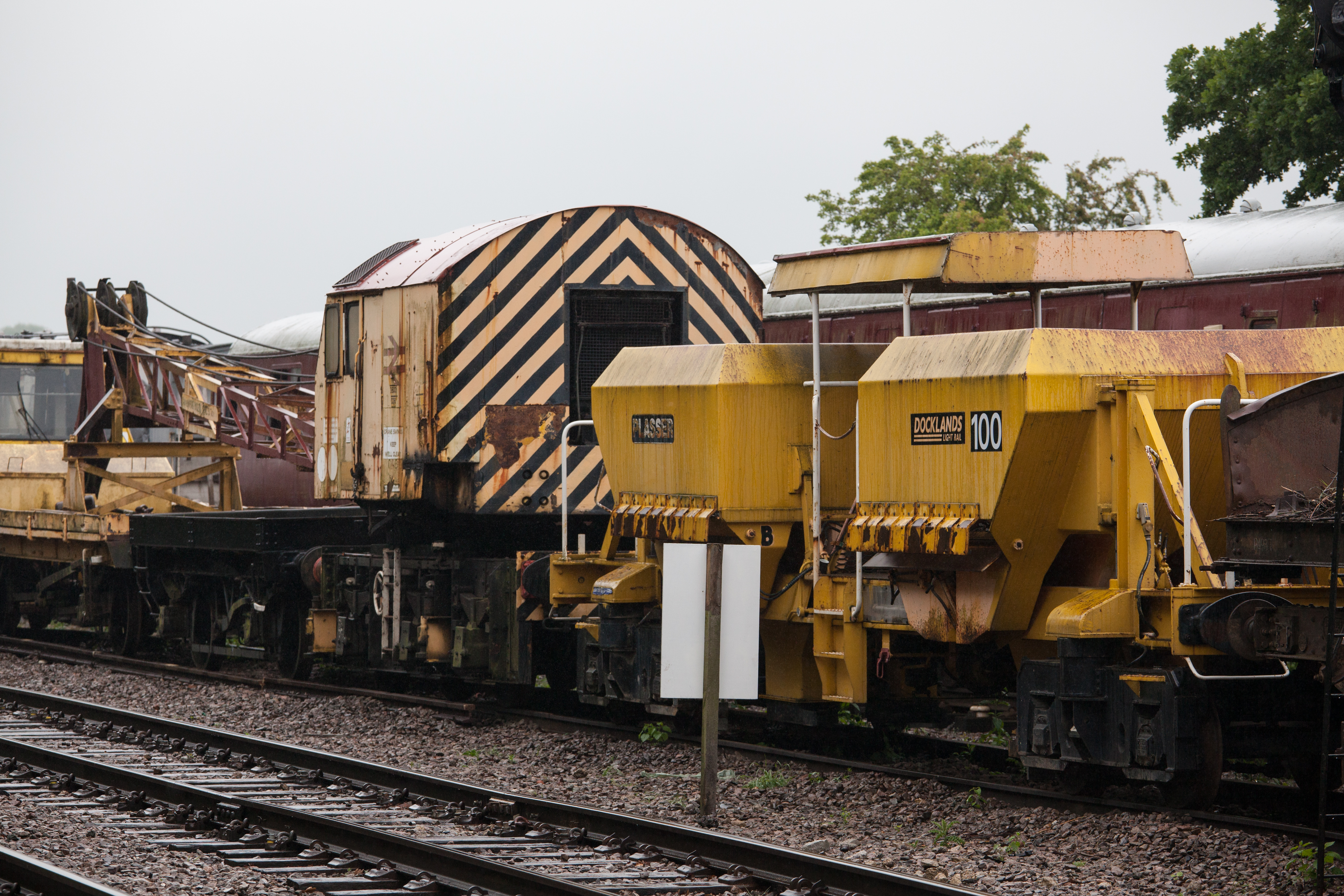
DLR maintenance vehicles at North Weald

In addition to the passenger trains, the DLR also has a small fleet of specialist vehicles used for maintenance work.

Number	Name	Builder	Type	Quantity	Notes
993	Kylie	Hunslet	4 wheel battery locomotive	1	
994	Kevin Keaney	GEC	0-4-0 diesel shunter	1	Ex-British Steel.
996-999			Flatbed wagons	4	
992	Sooty	Wickham	CT30 crane trolley	1	
991		Rexquote	Road rail vehicle	1	

=== Problems with wheel geometry ===
All DLR trains have wheels that have a more angular profile than that on National Rail mainline trains, which is effective in manoeuvring around the tight curves encountered on DLR routes. However, a disadvantage of this technology is that they are partly responsible for violent shaking as the trains run at faster speeds on straight sections of the route, a phenomenon known as hunting oscillation. The new B23 rolling stock will have improved bogies and suspension to reduce this shaking effect.

Another problem with the DLR's wheel geometry and tight rail curvature is that this setup makes noise, which is amplified by the use of steel box torsion girders (e.g. Marsh Wall elevated road crossing adjacent to South Quay DLR station).

== Corporate affairs ==
=== Infrastructure and ownership ===
Initially, DLR was a wholly owned subsidiary of London Regional Transport. In 1992, ownership was transferred to the London Docklands Development Corporation (LDDC). With the winding up of the LDDC in 1998, ownership passed to Department of the Environment, Transport and the Regions – before passing to Transport for London (TfL) in 2000.

The infrastructure is owned by Docklands Light Railway Ltd, part of the London Rail division of TfL, which also manages London Overground, London Trams, the London Cable Car and the Elizabeth line. The infrastructure is maintained by the private company awarded the DLR franchise by TfL – currently KeolisAmey Docklands. The Lewisham, City Airport and Woolwich Arsenal extensions were designed, financed, built and maintained by private companies (concessionnaires): City Greenwich Lewisham (CGL) Rail, City Airport Rail Enterprises (CARE), and Woolwich Arsenal Rail Enterprises (WARE). In 2011, Transport Trading Limited (a subsidiary of TfL) bought out the companies responsible for the City Airport and Woolwich Arsenal extensions, leaving only the Lewisham extension under private ownership until 31 March 2021, when the concession reverted to TfL.

=== Operations ===
Initially operated by London Regional Transport, the DLR was transferred to the LDDC in 1992. The LDDC appointed Brown and Root to run the system in 1993.

In 1994, it was announced that the DLR would be privatised, with operations and maintenance operated under franchise by the private sector. LDDC announced that three bidders had been considered to operate the franchise – Stagecoach Group, a joint venture between DLR staff and Serco, and a joint venture between Go-Ahead Group and French operator Via-GTI. In March 1997, the first franchise was awarded to Serco Docklands Limited for seven years; operations began in April 1997. A management buyout backed by Serco management later sold its shares to Serco. A two-year extension was granted in 2002.

In February 2005 TfL announced that Balfour Beatty/Keolis, First Carillion, RATP/Transdev and Serco had been shortlisted to operate the franchise, and in November 2005 TfL announced that Serco had retained the franchise for seven years from May 2006.

In July 2012, TfL called for expressions of interest in bidding for the next DLR franchise, and in January 2013 Serco's contract was extended until September 2014. In April 2013, TfL announced that Go-Ahead/Colas Rail, KeolisAmey (a joint venture of Keolis and Amey), Serco and Stagecoach had been shortlisted to bid for the next franchise. However, on 30 August, just before the bid submission date of 9 September 2013, Go-Ahead/Colas Rail pulled out. The franchise was awarded to KeolisAmey Docklands Limited, with a handover date of 7 December 2014, expiring in April 2021 with an option for extension without going to tender.

In August 2023, TfL went out for tender for the next DLR franchise, with KeolisAmey Docklands contract being extended to 2025 while bidding took place. In February 2024, TfL announced that KeolisAmey, ComfortDelGro and Connecting Docklands (a joint venture of AtkinsRéalis and Go-Ahead Group) had been shortlisted to bid for the next franchise. In October 2024, TfL announced that KeolisAmey retained the franchise, being awarded an eight-year contract to operate and maintain the DLR from 1 April 2025.

=== Performance ===
The first five years had unreliability and operational problems, but the system has since become highly reliable. Within a year of launch, annual passenger numbers reached 7 million, increasing to 50 million by 2004, and more than 100 million in 2013. Research in 2008 showed 87% of the population of North Woolwich were in favour of the DLR.

The Parliamentary Transport Select Committee favourably reviewed light rail in 2005, although the DLR was earlier criticised for having been designed with insufficient capacity to meet the demand that quickly arose.

Until 1 July 2013, the only bicycles that were allowed were folding ones. DLR stated that this is because if evacuation is required, they would slow down the process. DLR cars, especially older rolling stock, were not designed with bicycles in mind – if they were allowed, they might obstruct doors and emergency exits. Since January 2014, full-size bicycles have been allowed on DLR trains at off-peak hours and weekends (except Bank Station, where bicycles are not permitted for safety reasons).

=== Business trends ===
The key available trends in recent years for the Docklands Light Railway are (years ending 31 March):

	2010	2011	2012	2013	2014	2015	2016	2017	2018	2019	2020	2021	2022	2023	2024	2025	2026
Passenger revenue (Note: As defined in the DfT Light Rail and Tram Survey (Table LRT0301a)) (£M)	74.9	88.8	102.8	122.1	130.0	146.2	158.4	166.5	168.3	171.6	168.8	54.3	104.9	128.2	141.4	154.3	146.2
Profit/Financial assistance (Note: As defined in TfL's Annual Report and Statement of Accounts) (£M)	−208.3	−126.7	−480.0	−94.0	−53.5	−43.2	−57.2	−46.5	−38.0	−43.1	−42.9	−71.8	−199.8	−149.1	−199.2	−257.7	−215.5
Number of passengers (m)	69.4	78.3	86.1	100.0	101.6	110.2	116.9	122.3	119.6	121.8	116.8	39.7	77.2	92.3	98.9	97.8	90.8
Number of trains (at year end)	149	149	149	149	149	149	149	149	149	149	149	149	149	146	146	146	146
Notes/sources																	

Activities in financial years 2020/21 and 2021/22 were severely reduced by the impact of the coronavirus pandemic.

=== Passenger numbers ===
Estimated passenger journeys made on Docklands Light Railway per financial year (millions)
Year	Passenger journeys	Year	Passenger journeys	Year	Passenger journeys	Year	Passenger journeys	Year	Passenger journeys
1988/89	6.6	1996/97	16.7	2004/05	50.1	2012/13	100	2020/21	39.7
1989/90	8.5	1997/98	21	2005/06	53.5	2013/14	101.6	2021/22	77.2
1990/91	8	1998/99	27.6	2006/07	63.9	2014/15	110.2	2022/23	92.3
1991/92	7.9	1999/00	31.3	2007/08	66.6	2015/16	116.9	2023/24	98.9
1992/93	6.9	2000/01	38.4	2008/09	67.8	2016/17	122.3	2024/25	97.8
1993/94	8.3	2001/02	41.3	2009/10	69.4	2017/18	119.6	2025/26	
1994/95	11.3	2002/03	45.7	2010/11	78.3	2018/19	121.8	2026/27	
1995/96	14.5	2003/04	48.5	2011/12	86.1	2019/20	116.8	2027/28	
Estimates from the Department for Transport

== Future developments ==
=== Thamesmead extension ===
Mooted throughout the 2010s, an extension across the River Thames to Thamesmead was first proposed in November 2019 as part of the Thamesmead and Abbey Wood OAPF (Opportunity Area Planning Framework). Technical and feasibility work began in late 2020. Stations would be located at Beckton Riverside and Thamesmead. Public consultation into the extension began in 2023. In November 2025, the HM Treasury gave approval in the November budget for TfL and the Greater London Authority (GLA) to be loaned money to build the extension. Estimated to cost around £1.7 billion, construction of the extension could start in 2027 and be open in the "early 2030s".

=== Thames Wharf station ===
As part of the construction of the London City Airport extension, a gap in the viaduct due west of the western end of Royal Victoria Dock, between Canning Town and West Silvertown stations, was passively safeguarded for a future station when development came forward on the brownfield and industrial sites. A station was also initially proposed at Oriental Road; however this was discounted at an early stage and the site is now flanked by several developments. The potential of development on the land at Thames Wharf was on hold for until the late 2010s, as the area was being safeguarded for the route of the Silvertown Tunnel, a new Thames river crossing which opened on 7 April 2025.

As part of the 2018 budget, the Chancellor announced funding for the DLR to support development in the Royal Docks. Following completion of the Silvertown Tunnel, around 5,000 homes will be built on the site, and a new DLR station constructed.

=== Tower Gateway station to Tower Hill interchange ===
In July 2014, a Transport Supporting Paper from the London Infrastructure Plan 2050 by the Mayor of London considered the closure of Tower Gateway DLR station and the branch serving it, with a replacement interchange being provided via new platforms at Tower Hill Underground station. This would increase train frequencies to Bank by approximately 30 per cent, thereby unlocking more capacity on the Bank branch. (Note: It has been proven that almost all DLR passengers heading to the city get on DLR services to Bank instead of Tower Gateway, but only 75 per cent of services head to the former.)

== Extensions cancelled or not progressed ==
=== Gallions Reach to Dagenham Dock ===
The extension to Dagenham Dock in East London, via the Barking Riverside development was first proposed in 2003, and was anticipated that the project could be completed and open for use by 2017, at a cost of around £750 million. In November 2008, the Mayor of London Boris Johnson announced that due to financial constraints the extension, along with a number of other transport projects, had been cancelled. The Barking Riverside development is instead served by an extension of the London Overground to the new Barking Riverside station, which opened in July 2022.

=== Bank to Charing Cross ===
In February 2006, a proposal to extend the DLR to Charing Cross station from Bank DLR branch was revealed. The idea originates from a DLR "Horizon Study".

While not confirmed, it is probable that the Charing Cross scheme would use the overrun tunnels between Charing Cross Jubilee platforms and slightly west of Aldwych. These tunnels were intended to be incorporated into the abandoned Phase 2 of the Fleet Line (Phase 1 became the original Jubilee line, prior to the Jubilee line Extension). However they would need enlargement because the DLR loading gauge is larger than tube gauge and current safety regulations require an emergency walkway in the tunnel.

Two reasons driving the proposal are capacity problems at Bank, having just one interchange between the DLR and the central portion of Underground, and the lack of connection between Southeastern's routes and the DLR outside of Lewisham. Intermediate stations would be at City Thameslink/Ludgate Circus and Aldwych, which was intended for future connection with the proposed but now abandoned Cross River Tram.

=== City Thameslink to Euston and St Pancras ===
In 2011, strategy documents proposed a DLR extension to Euston and St Pancras. Transport for London have considered driving a line from City Thameslink via Holborn north to the rail termini. The main benefit of such an extension would be to broaden the available direct transport links to the Canary Wharf site. It would create a new artery in central London and help relieve the Northern and Circle lines and provide another metro line to serve the High Speed line into Euston.

=== Lewisham to Catford and Beckenham Junction ===
This possible extension was considered during the latest Horizon Study. The route would follow the Southeastern line and terminate between Catford and Catford Bridge stations. It has been seen as attractive to the district, as has the current terminus at Lewisham, built in an earlier extension. A map published in 2010 by Transport for London suggests that a further extension from Catford to Forest Hill has also been considered.

However, early plans showed problems due to Lewisham station being only marginally lower than the busy A20 road, which impedes any extension. The plan is however being revised. When the Lewisham extension was first completed there were proposals to continue further to Beckenham to link it up with the Tramlink system. However, the way in which Lewisham station was built impedes this possible extension and it would prove costly to redevelop.

=== Lewisham to Bromley North ===
Another proposal is to Bromley North by taking over the Bromley North Line, a short National Rail branch line which has no direct services into Central London. The scheme being considered by Transport for London and the London Borough of Bromley would convert the branch line to DLR operation. Although Lewisham Council planned to re-route the A20 road and redevelop the area south of Lewisham DLR station, the plans published in 2012 have no safeguarded route for an extension, making one unlikely.

== Accidents and incidents ==
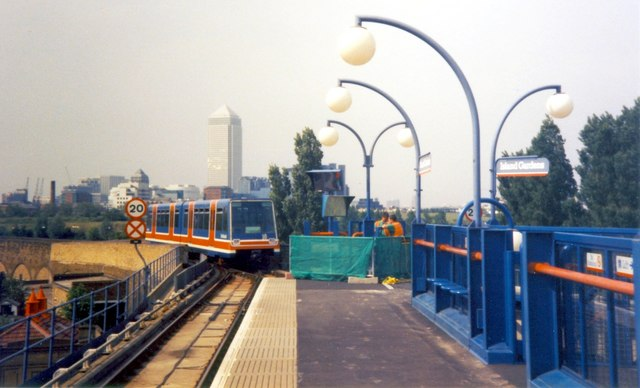
The original Island Gardens DLR station at the end of a viaduct

- On 10 March 1987, before the system opened, a test train crashed through buffer stops at the original high-level Island Gardens terminus and was left hanging from the end of the elevated track. The accident has largely been attributed to unauthorised tests being run before the correct installation of the wayside safety system had been verified; an omission in the wayside system allowed the train to travel too fast on the approach to the terminus. The train was being driven manually at the time. However, inside sources have stated these tests were being done to test the ATP if the train was entering the station too quickly, and after six successful tests, a software issue involving asynchronous computer systems caused the train to not receive the instructions to activate the ATP, cut off power from the motors, and apply the brakes soon enough to prevent the train from slowing down, causing the train to go through the buffers. Following this, the software was reworked and the braking distance was changed to ensure such incidents wouldn't happen in practice, and as a result may have possibly prevented a far more tragic incident from occurring.
- On 22 April 1991, two trains collided at a junction on the West India Quay bridge during morning rush hour, requiring a shutdown of the system and evacuation of passengers by ladder. One train was travelling automatically; the other was under manual control.
- On 9 February 1996, the Provisional IRA blew up a lorry under a bridge near South Quay, killing two people and injuring many others. This caused £85 million of damage and marked an end to an IRA ceasefire in force at the time. Significant disruption was caused and a train was stranded at Island Gardens, unable to move until the track was rebuilt.

== See also ==
- List of Docklands Light Railway stations
- List of tram and light rail transit systems
- Rail transport in Great Britain
- Transport in London (overview)
- Crossings of the River Thames
- Tunnels underneath the River Thames
