= Bow station =

Bow station or similar may refer to:

== Transport ==
- Bow station, a ship station

=== Open stations ===
- Bow Brickhill railway station, Buckinghamshire, England
- Bow Church DLR station, East London
- Bow Road tube station, East London
- Bow Street railway station, Wales
- Bowes Park railway station, North London
- Bromley-by-Bow tube station, East London
- Bø Station, Norway

=== Closed stations ===
- Bow railway station (Devon), England
- Bow railway station, East London
- Bow Road railway station, East London
- Bowes railway station, County Durham, England
- Bowness railway station, Cumbria
- Victoria Park & Bow railway station, East London

== Emergency services ==
- Bow Street Magistrates' Court and Police Station, Central London
- Bow Road Police station, East London, see Bow Road
- Bow Fire Station, see London Fire Brigade

== Farming ==
- Bow River Station, Western Australia
- Bowes Station, Western Australia
