= St Paul's, Bow Common =

Coordinates: 51.5176°N 0.0295°W

St Paul's Bow Common
- Church of St Paul's Bow Common
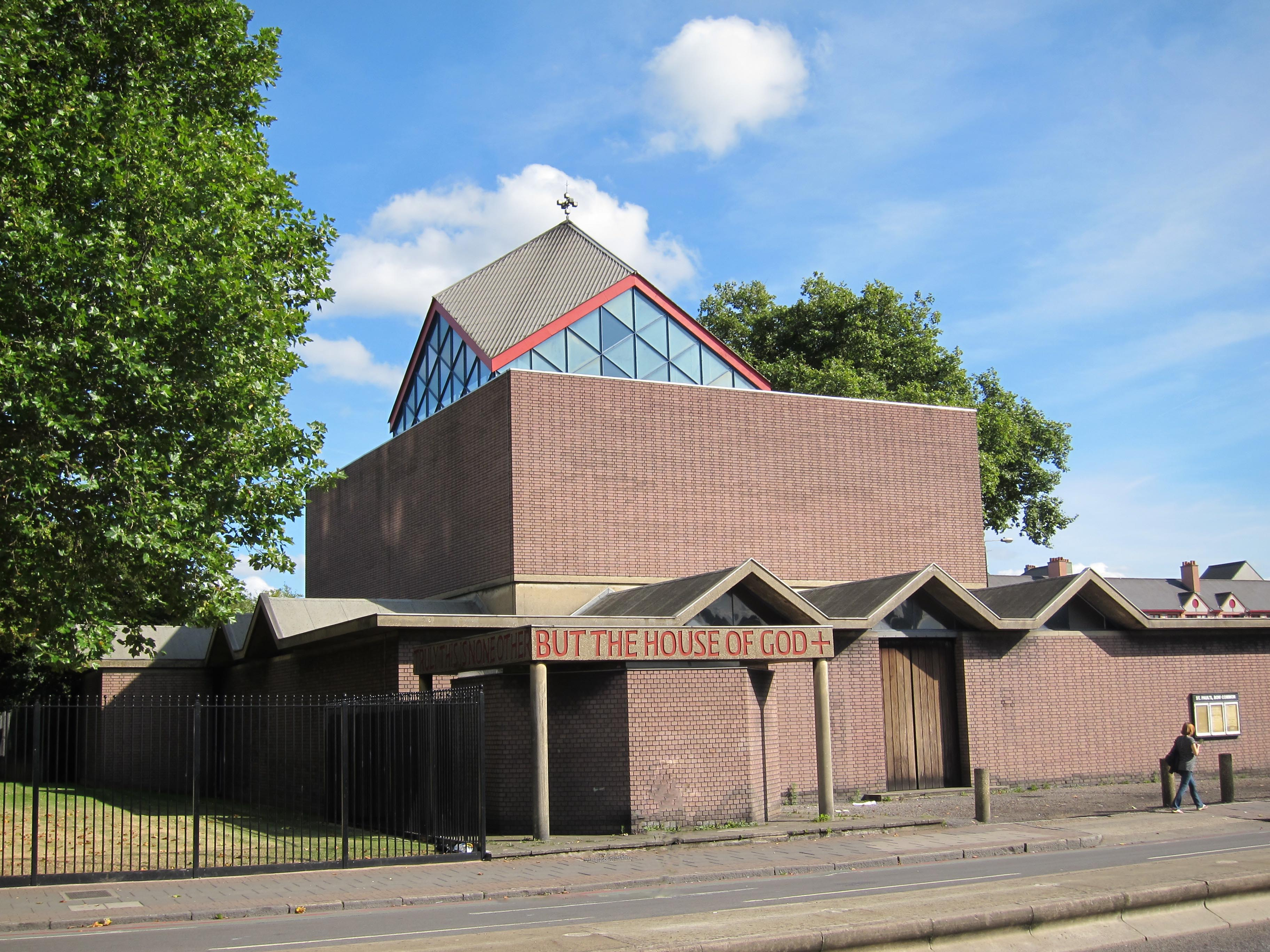
- Exterior view
- St Paul's Bow Common
- OS grid reference: TQ 36817 81693
- Location: Corner of Burdett Road & St Paul's Way, Bow Common, Tower Hamlets, London
- Country: England
- Denomination: Church of England
- Website: stpaulsbowcommon.org

Architecture
- Architect(s): Robert Maguire, Keith Murray
- Style: new brutalism
- Years built: 1958–60

Administration
- Diocese: London

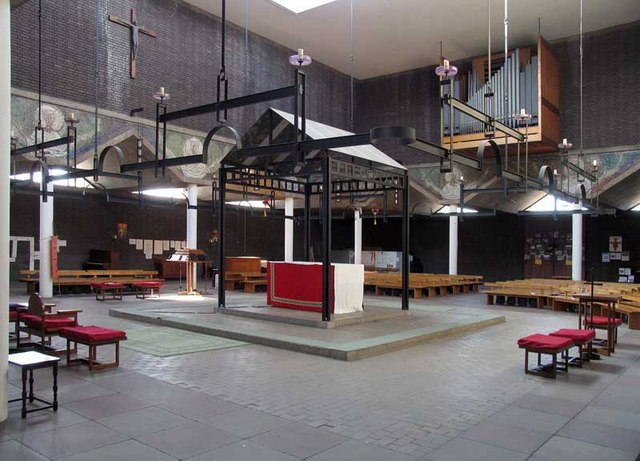
The interior

St Paul's Bow Common is a 20th-century church in Bow Common, London, England. It is an Anglican church in the Diocese of London. The church is at the junction of Burdett Road and St Paul's Way in the London Borough of Tower Hamlets. It replaced an earlier church that was designed by Rohde Hawkins in 1858 and financed by William Cotton of Leytonstone. Consecrated by Bishop Charles James Blomfield, this church was largely destroyed in the Second World War and demolished in the 1950s.

== Architecture ==
The modern church was built in 1958–60, and the building is listed Grade II*. Its architects were Robert Maguire and Keith Murray. The Revd. Gresham Kirkby, a Christian anarchist, was the architects' engaged client, championing the Liturgical Movement principles and continuing as parish priest until 1994. St Paul's is one of the clearest and earliest centralised churches from this movement. "It is rated one of the best post-war buildings in Britain".

=== Artworks ===
The bold lettering wrapping around the porch reads 'Truly this is none other but the house of God. This is the Gate of Heaven' (Genesis 28:17), and was designed and cast in situ by Ralph Beyer. An 800-square-foot (74 m^{2}) mosaic by Charles Lutyens in tesserae of coloured Murano glass (1963–68), Angels of the Heavenly Host is possibly the largest artist-created contemporary mosaic mural in Britain. The church was initially home to Lutyens' Outraged Christ sculpture in 2011, subsequently moved more permanently to Liverpool Cathedral.

Artist Rose Finn-Kelcey's installation Angel covered the church's 78 square metre facade from February to July 2004. Commissioned by Art and Sacred Places, it was the joint winner of the 2007/2008 ACE Award for ‘Art in a Religious Context’.

== Legacy ==
On 7 November 2013, the church won the National Churches Trust Diamond Jubilee Award for best Modern Church built in the UK since 1953. The awards were judged by architecture critic Jonathan Glancey, director of the Twentieth Century Society Catherine Croft, president of the Ecclesiastical Architects and Surveyors Association Sherry Bates, and trustee of the National Churches Trust Richard Carr-Archer. The building was described by the judges as the ‘embodiment of the groundswell of ideas about Christian worship’ and a ‘hugely influential signpost for future Anglican liturgy’.

== Present day ==
The Revd Gresham Kirkby was succeeded by the Revd Prebendary Duncan Ross, who retired in October 2013. The current vicar is Mother Bernadette Hegarty.

St Paul's is part of the Bow Group of Anglican churches, together with Bow Church (St Mary and Holy Trinity); All Hallows, Bow; St Paul's, Old Ford and St Barnabas Bethnal Green.

== See also ==
- St Matthew's Church, Perry Beeches, Birmingham (1964), by the same architects
