= Burdett Road railway station =

Disused railway station in England

Burdett Road
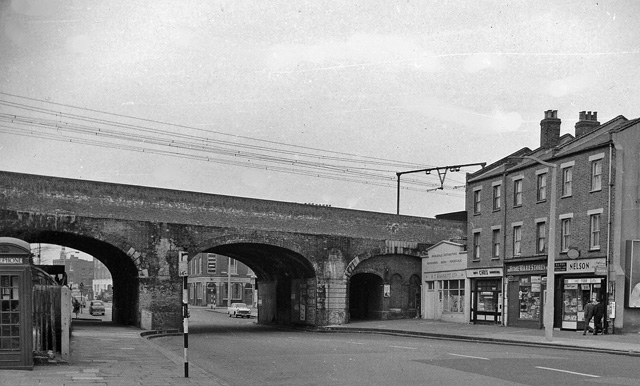
- Site of the closed Burdett Road station in 1962

General information
- Location: Bow Common, Tower Hamlets
- Coordinates: 51.51823°N 0.03126°W
- Platforms: 2

Other information
- Status: Disused

History
- Opened: 11 September 1871
- Closed: 21 April 1941
- Pre-grouping: Great Eastern Railway
- Post-grouping: London and North Eastern Railway
Location
- Location in Tower Hamlets

Burdett Road is a disused railway station located in Bow Common, east London. It was opened in 1871 by the Great Eastern Railway and closed in 1941.

== History ==
=== The line through the station ===
Burdett Road was located on the London and Blackwall Extension Railway (LBER) which was opened on 2 April 1849 and was an extension of the original London and Blackwall Railway from Stepney to Bow & Bromley. It was 2 miles 21 chains (3.6 km) down line from Fenchurch Street. The LBER had wished to extend its trains towards Stratford, but relations with the Eastern Counties Railway were poor and they would not allow a physical junction to be constructed. An exchange platform was provided at a station called Victoria Park and Bow but few ECR trains called there. The service was withdrawn on 2 May 1850 although a few months later on 26 September the initial section of the East and West India Docks and Birmingham Junction Railway (which changed its name to the North London Railway on 1 January 1853) connected to the LBER at Gas Factory Junction.

The relationship between the ECR and LBER finally improved and in 1854 the junction between the two lines was built and the two companies operated services over the Bow line.

In 1858 the London Tilbury and Southend Railway opened its Barking extension joining the LBER at Gas Factory Junction.

By the 1860s the railways in East Anglia were in financial trouble, and most were leased to the ECR; they wished to amalgamate formally, but could not obtain government agreement for this until 1862, when the Great Eastern Railway (GER) was formed by amalgamation. The LTSR and NLR remained outside the Great Eastern as independent rail companies.

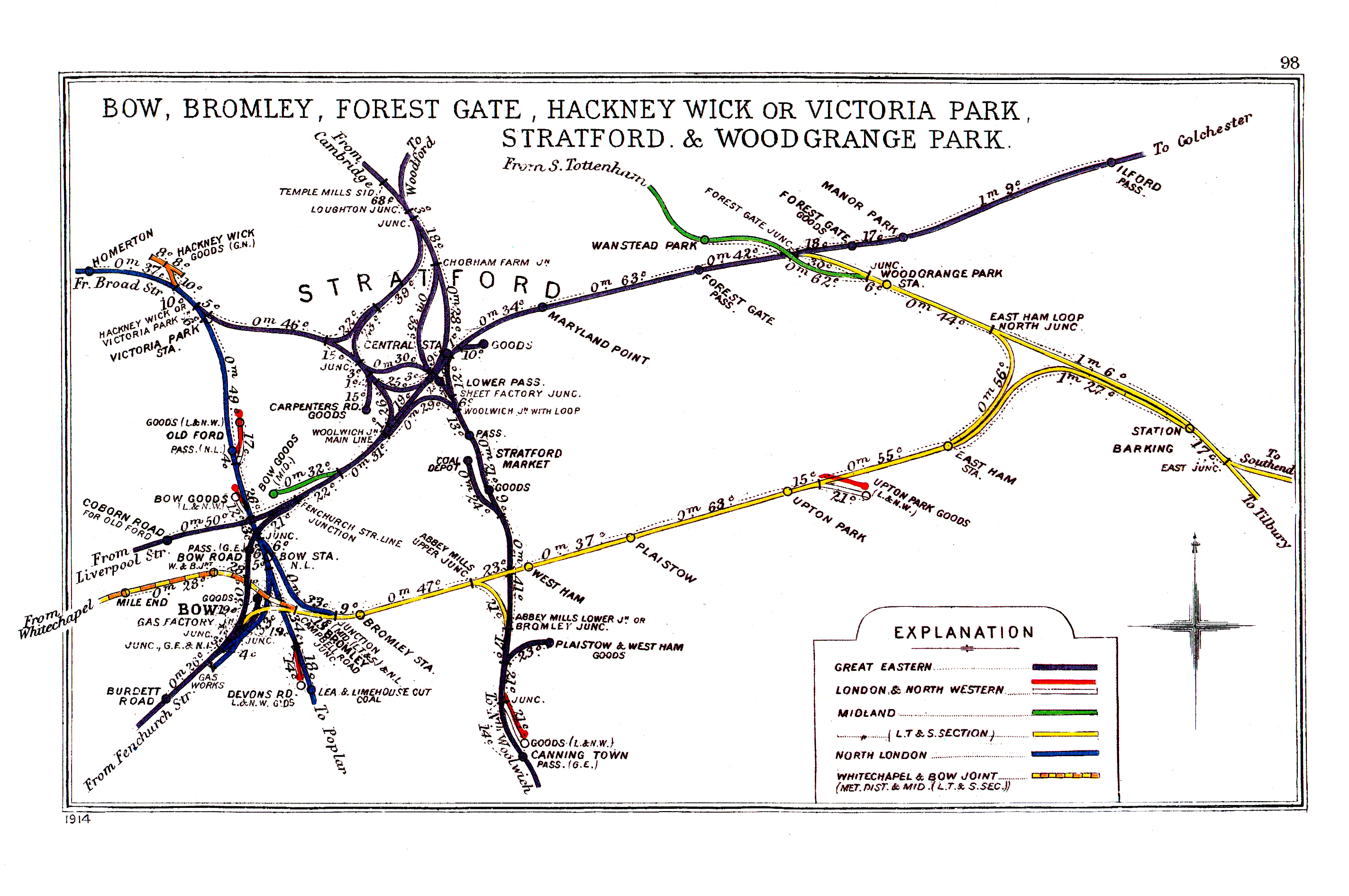
A 1914 Railway Clearing House Junction Diagram showing railways in the vicinity of Burdett Road (bottom left)

=== Opening ===
The station was opened on 11 September 1871 by the Great Eastern Railway who had leased the London and Blackwall Extension Railway (LBER) from 1866. The line at this point was on a viaduct and with little available space at street-level the entrance to the station was incorporated within the structure of the viaduct.

The buildings on the two platforms were largely of wood construction and the platforms both had lengthy awnings affording shelter from the elements.

=== Services ===
Trains serving Burdett Road ran every 15 minutes to, what was advertised on the GER handbills, as Bow New station which was in reality the NLR Bow station. This service was originally run by the NLR but had been taken over by the GER in 1869. In 1876 the GER re-built and opened the first station at Bow Road and started operating trains on that route. Both services continued operation until 1892 when Bromley and Bow station was closed and replaced by the second Bow Road station a short distance to the north which offered a footway link to the NLR station. The GER service from the NLR station to Fenchurch Street was then withdrawn.

From 1 November 1891 LTSR trains started calling at Burdett Road.

The July 1922 Bradshaw's Railway Guide showed services from the Great Eastern Railway to Ilford via Stratford, and to North Woolwich and Custom House via Bow Road and Stratford Market, on Tables 318 and 320. LTSR services to various destinations including Tilbury, Southend and Shoeburyness could be found on Table 650.

=== Commercial arrangements ===
The actual relationships between the various companies with regard to Burdett Road were quite complex. Between 1866 and 1922, Burdett Road was simultaneously owned by the London and Blackwall, leased to the Great Eastern, and had services operated by both the GER and LTSR. It was not a joint line or station, nor were they joint services, because east of Gas Factory Junction the routes and destinations were different. The GER's lease of the line meant that they managed the line and station, and were responsible for all expenses, but still had to hand over a proportion of the receipts to the LTSR (for journeys to its destinations) and to the London and Blackwall, which paid a dividend to its shareholders.

=== Closure ===
The London and North Eastern Railway took over operation of the station in 1923 following the grouping which was also when the LBER ceased to legally exist. The nearby Mile End station on the London Underground, which opened in 1902, proved more popular than Burdett Road. With the demands placed on the railway system by the Second World War and bomb damage in December 1940 saw the station closed for a week for emergency repairs. Further damage saw the station closed on 21 April 1941. The surrounding area was heavily redeveloped after the war to make way for Mile End Park, and today little trace remains of Burdett Road station; the westbound platform space survives but is derelict. The LBER line is still open (as of 2014), forming part of the London, Tilbury and Southend line from Fenchurch Street to Shoeburyness.

After closure the entrance to the station was used as a woodworking factory with wood stored on the old stairwells. The station entrance disappeared in 1984 as part of a road widening scheme.

== Location ==
The station was located on Burdett Road in the Bow Common area of the Metropolitan Borough of Stepney in the East End of London.

== Locomotive named after station ==
The LTSR introduced a class of 4-4-2T locomotive in 1880 known as the Tilbury Tanks and number 18 (built 1881) of this class was named Burdett Road.

== Notes ==
Preceding station	Disused railways	Following station
Stepney East towards Fenchurch Street	London and Blackwall Extension Railway	Bow Road towards Stratford
Stepney East towards Fenchurch Street	North London Railway	Bow towards Bow
Stepney East towards Fenchurch Street	London, Tilbury and Southend Railway	Bromley towards Barking
