= All Hallows, Bow =

Church in Bow, London, England

- Church of All Hallows, Bromley by Bow
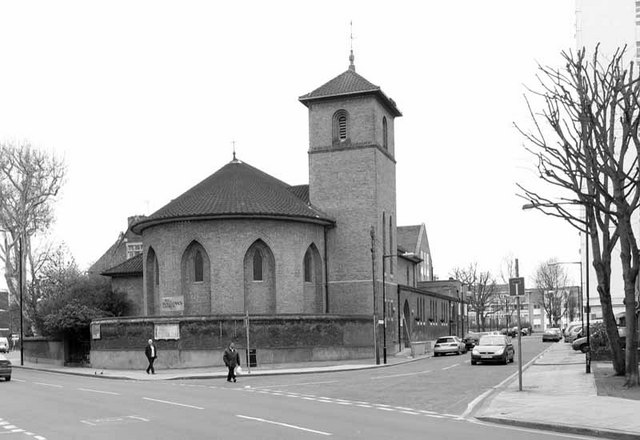
- All Hallows, Bow
- All Hallows, Bow
- 51°31′14″N 0°01′12″W
- OS grid reference: TQ 37461 82033
- Location: 1 Blackthorn Street, London, E3 3PN
- Country: England
- Denomination: Church of England
- Website: allhallowsbow.org

Administration
- Diocese: London

Clergy
- Rector: Cris Rogers

All Hallows, Bow (also known as All Hallows, Devons Road), is an Anglican church in Bow, London, England. It is within the Diocese of London.

== History ==
The church was built in 1873–1874 to the design of Ewan Christian, an eminent Victorian church architect. The construction of the church was funded by the Clothworkers' Company, who used the proceeds from the demolition in 1873 of All Hallows Staining in the City of London for the project. The church was damaged by bombing in the Second World War and was rebuilt in 1954–1955 by A P Robinson who retained only the core of the original building and created a new church in the "Early Christian" style. In 2001, the nave was divided by a screen to create a church hall. The church is in the London Borough of Tower Hamlets and the Diocese of London.

The church's Rector is Cris Rogers. In 2010, he led a planting team from St Paul's, Shadwell, to All Hallows, Bow. He served as a curate at the church from 2010 to 2014, while Ric Thorpe was Priest-in-Charge. An official re-licensing ceremony took place in 2015. Adrian Newman, Bishop of Stepney, presided over the ceremony. A growing number of people had been gathering in the church to worship before this date.

All Hallows is part of the Bow Group of Anglican churches, together with Bow Church (St Mary and Holy Trinity); St Paul's, Bow Common; St Paul's, Old Ford and St Barnabas Bethnal Green.
