= St Paul's, Old Ford =

St Paul Old Ford
- Church of St Paul Old Ford
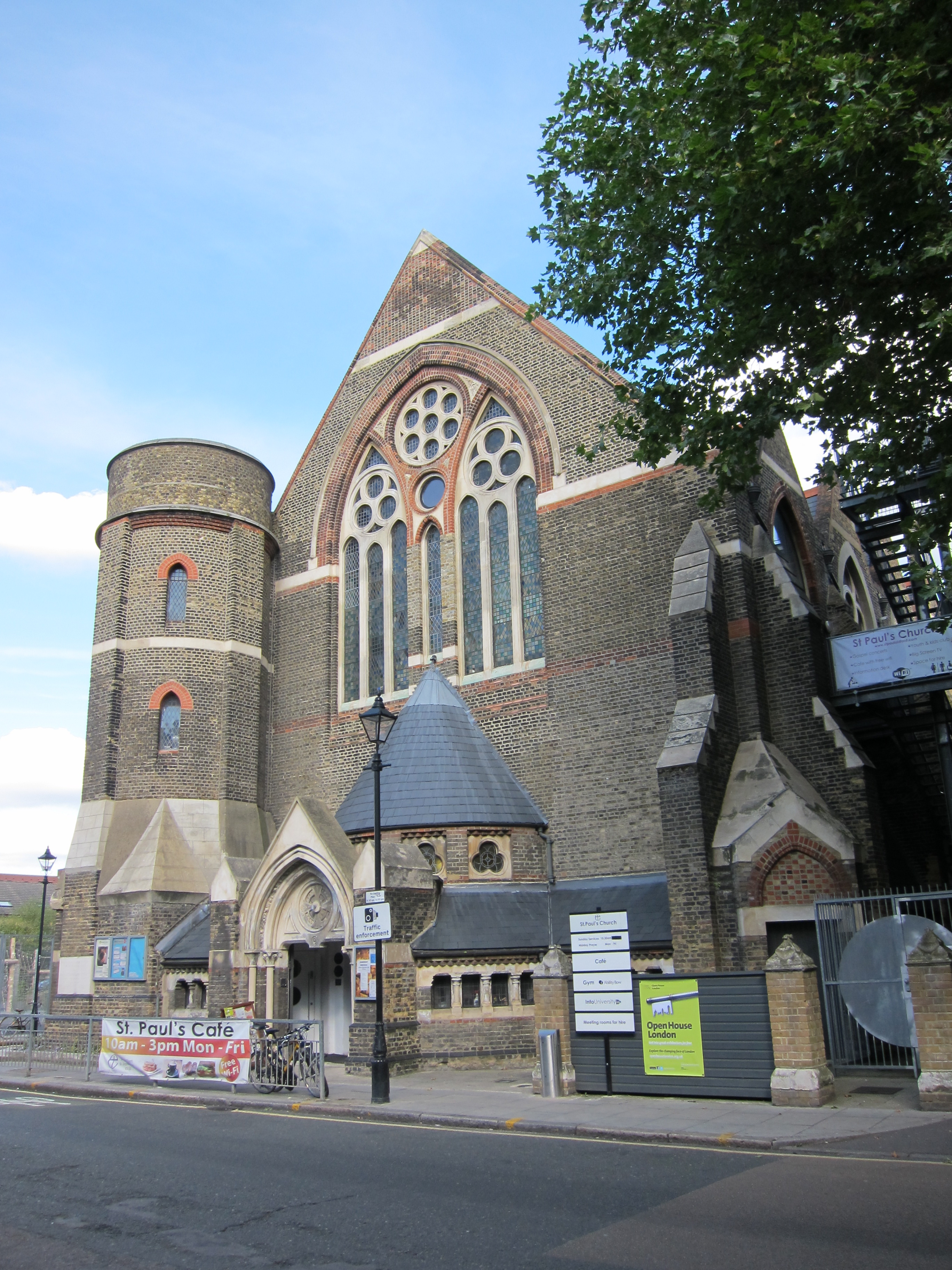
- St Paul Old Ford
- 51°31′59″N 0°1′57″W
- Location: St Stephens Road; Old Ford; London E3 5JL
- Country: England
- Denomination: Church of England
- Website: www.stpauloldford.com

History
- Founded: 1878

Architecture
- Heritage designation: Grade II listed

Administration
- Metropolis: London
- Archdiocese: Canterbury
- Diocese: London
- Deanery: Stepney

Clergy
- Vicar: Darius Weithers

St Paul's, Old Ford, is a late 19th-century church in Old Ford, London, England. It is an Anglican church in the Diocese of London.

== History ==
St Paul's church was built in 1878 in Old Ford and adjacent to a primary school with over 650 children on the official school roll. In 1991, the building was closed due to maintenance and safety concerns. The Parochial Church Council (PCC) and the locals were determined to see that the church remained open and, in fact, was improved. The "A New Heart for Bow" project was born. More than £3,000,000 was raised from more than a dozen sources and philanthropies. Matthew Lloyd Architects was appointed to refurbish the building and enable it to serve the wider community as well as the church. Originally designed to seat 600 worshippers, the worship space was reordered, retaining original features and furnishings, to seat approximately 150. A 'building within a building' was inserted in the nave: a four-storey steel frame clad in tulipwood is supported on curving steel columns to sit above the worship space. Dubbed the Ark, this insertion in effect adds two new floors to accommodate flexible community spaces. In the attic, above the Ark, a ‘universal access’ gymnasium has been inserted along with an office and changing rooms. Balfour Beatty served as the main contractor, and work began in March 2003 and ended over a year later, in May 2004.

St Paul's is part of the Bow Group of Anglican churches, together with Bow Church (St Mary and Holy Trinity); St Paul's, Bow Common; All Hallows, Bow and St Barnabas Bethnal Green.
