= Cris Rogers =

The Reverend Cris Rogers
- Rector of All Hallows, Bow
- Church: Church of England
- Diocese: Diocese of London
- In office: 2015 to present

Orders
- Ordination: June 2007 (deacon); June 2008 (priest)

Personal details
- Born: Christopher Rogers; 4 February 1979 (age 47) Pontefract, West Yorkshire, England
- Website: wearemakingdisciples.com

Christopher "Cris" Rogers (born 4 February 1979) is a Church of England priest. He was among the first to be ordained to the ordained pioneer ministry in the Church of England. He is currently the rector of All Hallows' Church, Bow, London.

== Early life ==
Rogers was born in Pontefract, West Yorkshire and attended Freeston High School, Normanton, where he gained 10 GCSEs. In 1996, he went on to study for a BTech in Art at Leeds College of Art and Design. In 2000, he received his bachelor's degree in Theology from Trinity College, Bristol.

== Christian Ministry ==
In 2004, Rogers went on to study for his Master's degree in Theology from King's College London, and became the lead pastor of Soul Survivor Church in Harrow, North West London.

Rogers was ordained deacon by the bishop of London, Richard Chartres, to the Anglican Church in June 2007. He was then ordained as a pioneer minister and a priest by the area bishop of Willesden, Pete Broadbent, in June 2008. Rogers was one of the first to be ordained to the role, which was seen as a breakthrough in creative leadership within the Church of England.

In September 2010, he moved to Devons Road, Bow in the East End of London, where he was associate vicar at All Hallows, Church before being licensed as rector to the same church in January 2015.

In 2020 Rogers became the chair of the Spring Harvest Planning Group. Rogers has been teaching at Spring Harvest since 2002 joining the Planning Group in 2012.

== Other projects ==
=== Spring Harvest ===
Rogers is planning group chair at Spring Harvest Christian Easter Conference, where he has been involved in theological teaching and writing since 2011.

=== Magazine and radio ===
Rogers is becoming known for his dynamic bible teaching, and was quoted in Christianity Magazine, speaking about the future of the art form:

"Preaching has come to a desperate state where we now are on borrowed time. Communicating the gospel isn't dead but the traditional forms may well be. We need to put to death the monologue and be re-inspired with two-way communication. I don't think we have the liberty not to be creative anymore."

The article describes Rogers as a dynamic preacher who is always coming up with new ways of teaching the Bible. Rogers is creative through appealing to the senses, physically giving people some salt or water if that is what he is talking about, or cooking a bacon sandwich while talking about the food laws of Leviticus. "Jesus had illustrations right there where they were touchable. Yet when we preach so often we simply show a photo or describe a situation. What if we did what Jesus did and actually had the thing that was the illustration there for them to touch smell or taste?"

Rogers has also been a monthly theology writer for YouthWork Magazine, writing for youth workers to understand the background to the books of the Bible.

=== Author ===
In January 2004, Kevin Mayhew Publishing published Rogers' first book, Naked Christianity: Helping young people grasp issues of faith. Rogers undertook a speaking tour across the UK also titled "Naked Christianity" in the same year.

In October 2022, Rogers' updated edition of The Bible Book by Book won the CRT Bible Reference Award.

=== Television appearances ===
In December 2004, Rogers was interviewed by Teachers TV about how to communicate effectively in the RE class room while using one of Teachers TV's discussion resources as an example.

=== Kingdom Rise ===
Rogers worked with Rob Peabody on a series called Kingdom Rise. A new way forward in Christian resources, this small group study combined Bible study with films and a worship album promoting issues of worship and justice.

=== The Pursuit ===
Rogers worked with Peabody on The Pursuit conference, a four-day, 24/7 worship, prayer gathering discussing community and justice issues. It is a weekend of retreat for people to engage with God and people in a real and authentic way. The first conference was in May 2015 followed up in 2016.

== Personal life ==
Rogers and his wife, Beki, have two children and live in Bow, London. She is also associate rector at the church.

== Books by Cris Rogers ==
- The Bible Book by Book Updated Edition (Monarch, 2022) ISBN 978-1-8003-0041-5
- What if We Knew What God Knows About Us (Monarch Books; (20 Mar. 2018)) ISBN 978-0857219039
- Making Disciples(Monarch Books; 1st New edition (20 Mar. 2015)) ISBN 978-0857216373
- Immeasurably More: To a Dehydrated Church Jesus Has Immeasurably More to Offer. (Essential Christian (20 April 2018)) ISBN 978-1911237082
- Naked Christianity: Helping young people grasp issues of faith (Kevin Mayhew, 2004) ISBN 978-1-84417-341-9 (out of print)
- Am I A Freak (Kevin Mayhew, 2005) ISBN 978-1-84417-480-5
- A Monkey's Orientation, A Book About Holiness (Authentic, 2008) ISBN 978-1-85078-782-2
- Practising Resurrection: The church being the hands feet and heart of Jesus (Authentic, 2010) ISBN 978-1-85078-860-7
- The Bible Book by Book (Monarch, 2012) ISBN 978-0-85721-016-6
- The Rebel's Guide to the Good News (Elevation, 2013) ASIN B00CEU8IQM
