= Bow Common =

Coordinates: 51.518010°N 0.021093°W

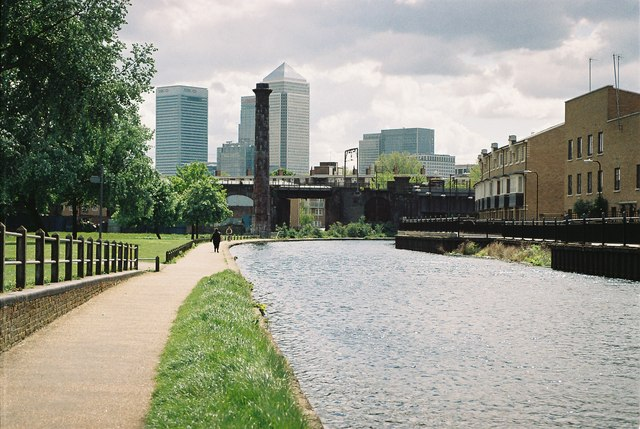
- Regent's Canal, Bow Common

- Location within Greater London
- London borough: Tower Hamlets
- Ceremonial county: Greater London
- Region: London
- Country: England
- Sovereign state: United Kingdom
- Post town: LONDON
- Postcode district: E3, E14
- Dialling code: 020
- Police: Metropolitan
- Fire: London
- Ambulance: London
- London Assembly: City and East

Bow Common was an area of common land, that lay on Bow Common Lane in what is now the London Borough of Tower Hamlets. Despite the name, the common lay just inside Mile End's parish boundary with Bromley by Bow, and not in the parish of Bow which was further to the north.

The term is also used to refer to the locale around the former common, on both sides of the parish boundary.

== The Common ==
Bow Common was a small common which lay on either side of part of Bow Common Road. In the Middle Ages it was known as Furseyheath, presumably due to Furze (also known as Gorse) growing there. In 1720 it was recorded as Pesthouse Common and in 1745 as Brumley (ie Bromley) Common. From the 1770s onward it was known as Bow Common. It was destroyed in the mid 1800s.

Ropery Street approximates to the northern edge of the Common with Tower Hamlets Cemetery Park laid out on adjoining land to the north.

== The district ==
The term Bow Common has been applied to areas around the Common from soon after urbanisation; the earliest reference to Bow Common as a neighbourhood rather than as an area of common land is from 1847. The area includes the housing estates of Burdett and Lincoln Estates.

== History ==
Bow Common was an industrial district producing and supplying London's town gas demands – the former Victorian Gas works site at Bow Common is one of a few remaining following the surrounding area's ongoing transformation. In 1883 anti-poverty campaigner Andrew Mearns commented on the lack of church attendance amongst locals, and Charles Booth described it as 'worse than almost any district in London.' Slums were cleared during the course of the 20th century, most hastened by bomb damage in the Second World War when Bow was targeted for it being an important artery to feed the demands of the city at that time.

St Paul's Church was rebuilt in the fashionable 'new brutalism' style of 1960 (replacing one damaged in the war) and is now a Grade II* listed building.

=== Contemporary ===
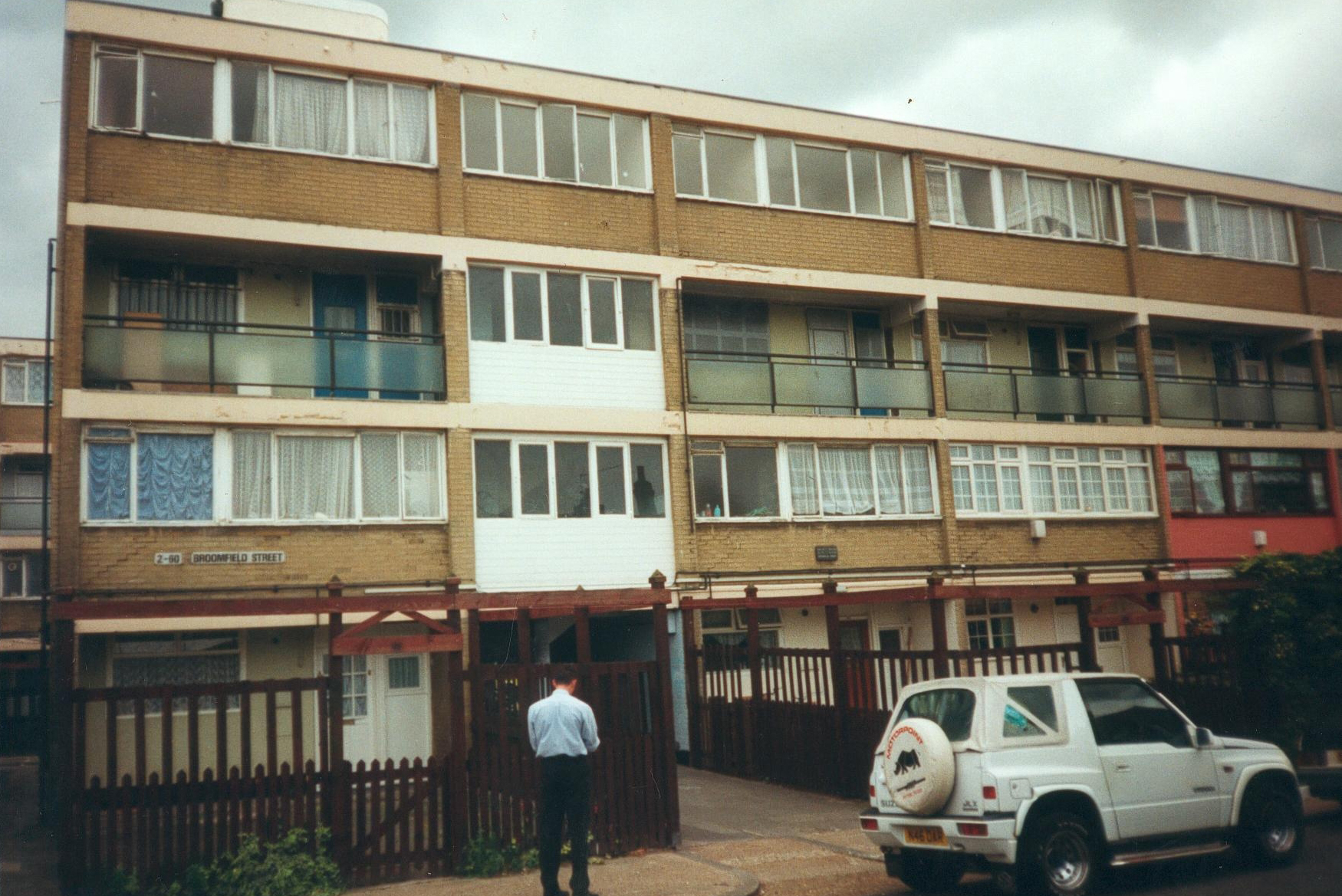
Broomfield Street in 1998, before regeneration.

The Spratt's Complex was redeveloped and split into studio workshops (live/work units) and sold by JJAK (Construction) Ltd for leaseholders to fit out. The first building to be converted was Limehouse Cut, varying in size between 580 to 1,610 sq ft (54 to 150 m^{2}). The building was featured in the Sunday Times in June 1986 and again in 1989.

A new site for the local Irish Travellers community was built in 2008 within the Bow Triangle Business Park, after the old site was required for Crossrail construction.

Professor Brian Cox and Baron Mawson opened the new £500,000 Lincoln Pharmacy in 2019, featuring a robot that fulfills customer prescriptions, freeing up staff for health advice. This was part of a project to modernise Bow Common.

== Transport ==
Bow Common has no connection to the London Underground, and is connected to the Docklands Light Railway at Devons Road DLR station. Historically it had a stop on London, Tilbury and Southend Railway called Burdett Road that opened on 11 September 1871 by the Great Eastern Railway who had leased it to the London and Blackwall Extension Railway (LBER) from 1866, with the demands placed on the railway system by World War II and bomb damage in December 1940 saw the station closed for a week for emergency repairs but further damage saw the station closed on 21 April 1941.

Bow Common is served by several London Buses; 108, 277, 309, 323, D6 and D7 all call in the area. It is also linked to the London Night Bus network by the N277 while the 108 is a 24-hour service. The 108 uses the Blackwall Tunnel, a source of severe delays which leads to the route often being cited as amongst the least reliable in London.
