= St Barnabas Bethnal Green =

Coordinates: 51.5311°N 0.0400°W

- Church of St Barnabas Bethnal Green
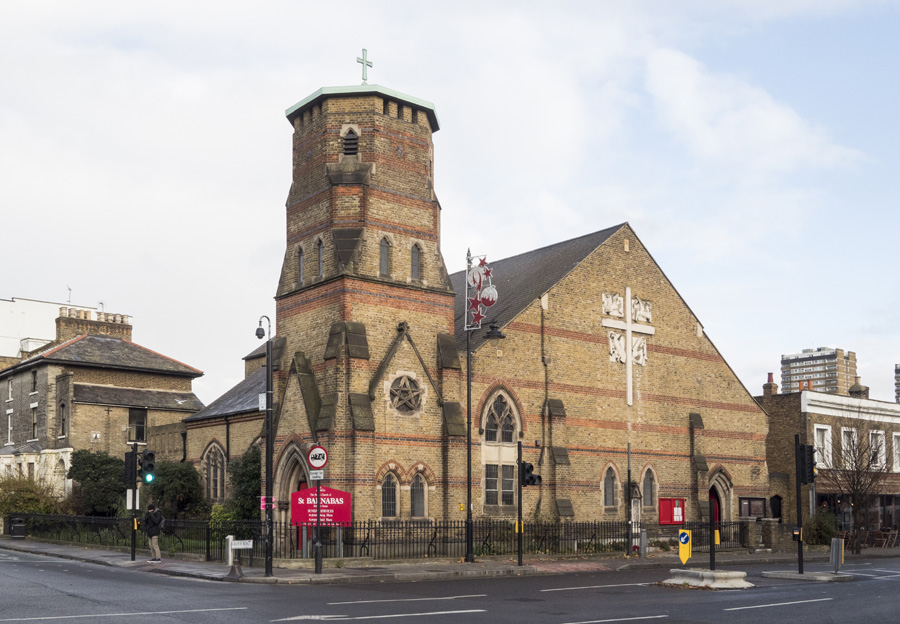
- St Barnabas Bethnal Green
- OS grid reference: TQ 36049 83174
- Location: Grove Road, Bow, Tower Hamlets, London E3 5TG
- Country: England
- Denomination: Church of England
- Website: www.stbarnabasbethnalgreen.org

Administration
- Diocese: London
- Archdeaconry: Hackney
- Deanery: Tower Hamlets

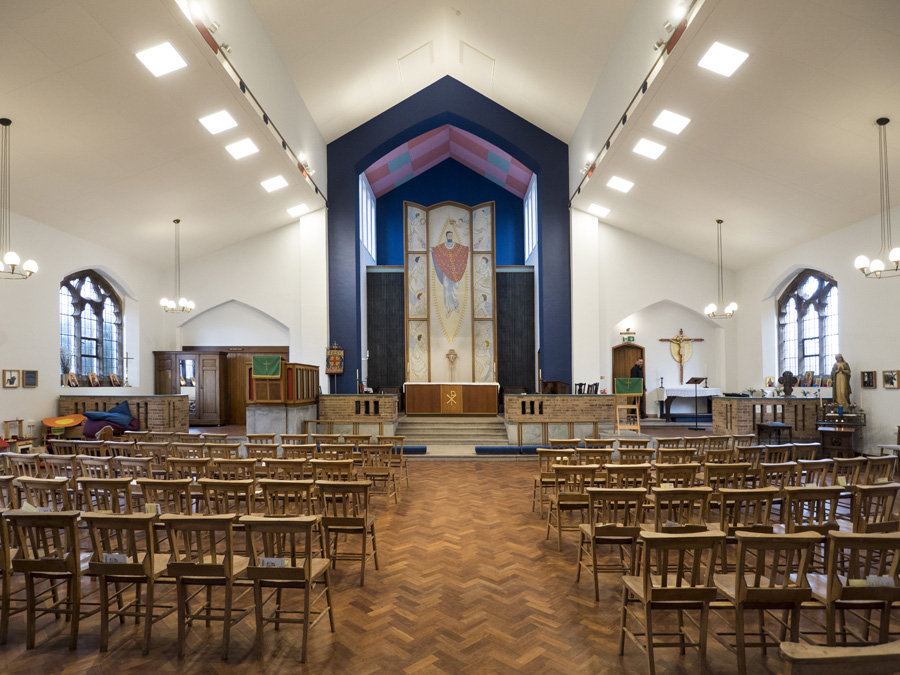
Interior of the church

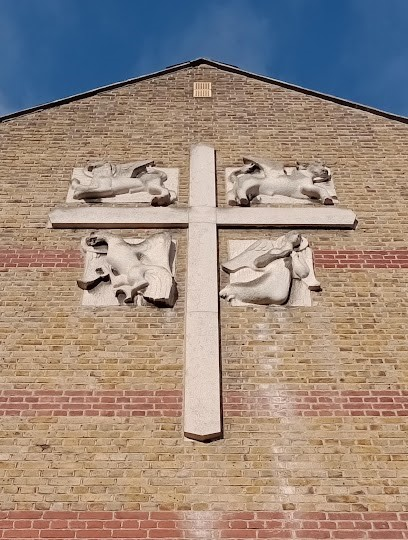
The Four Evangelists by Don Potter on St Barnabas Bethnal Green

St Barnabas Bethnal Green is a late 19th-century church in Bow in London, England. It is an Anglican church in the Diocese of London. The church is at the junction of Roman Road and Grove Road in the Bow West ward of London Borough of Tower Hamlets.

== History of the building ==
In 1865 there was an Anglican mission called St Luke's run by the nearby church of St Simon Zelotes, but the current St Barnabas building began life as the Baptist Union Church.

It was built in 1865, to a design by William Wigginton, in a Gothic Revival style, in yellow brick, banded with red and black. The church building, which is not oriented, was built with a broad chancel, nave, west gallery and an octagonal south west tower with a spire.

The church was sold to the Church of England in 1868, and in 1870 consecrated for the Church of England by John Jackson the Bishop of London, with a district assigned from the parishes of St James the Less and St Simon Zelotes.

In 1876 a large brick vicarage was built south of the Roman Road. It was first inhabited by George Barnes, vicar from 1870-1902, President of Sion College in 1887 and rural dean of Spitalfields 1898-1901.

The church was badly damaged by bombing during the Second World War. Following the end of the war the steeple was removed and the church rebuilt, retaining the tower and north and south walls. This remodelling was carried out by J Anthony Lewis of architects Michael Tapper & Lewis, who commissioned the sculptor Don Potter to create "The Four Evangelists" on the outside of the building (c.1957). Potter also created a font in Clipsham stone. In 1957 a two-manual electric Jennings organ was installed in the restored church. A plaque in the church states that the restored church was rededicated on 18 June 1957 by the Bishop of London.

Before 1965 St Barnabas was in the Metropolitan Borough of Bethnal Green.

St Barnabas is part of the Bow Group of Anglican churches, together with Bow Church (St Mary and Holy Trinity); St Paul's, Bow Common; St Paul's, Old Ford and All Hallows, Bow.

=== School ===
St Barnabas National School (formally St Luke's) was based in a Gothic building at the junction of Roman Road and Lanfranc Road. It was founded in 1866 and was also used as a mission church. It closed in 1905 and was converted into a church institute.

== Priests of the church ==
A notice within the church gives the following names and dates of priests of St Barnabas.

- 1870-1902 George Barnes. Barnes was also president of Sion College (1887) and rural dean of Spitalfields (1898-1901)
- 1902-1920 Alexander Bassell Winter. Later Winter was chaplain of St Ursula's Church, Bern, Switzerland
- 1920-1941 Thomas Felix
- 1942-1945 William Charles Smith
- 1945-1949 William George Hossack Redmond Parr
- 1950-1960 George William Saunders
- 1961-1967 Christopher Dudley Johnson
- 1967-1972 John Whitmore Griffiths
- 1973-1975 Arthur Robert Royall. Royall was also rural dean of Poplar (1965-1966), rural dean of Tower Hamlets (1968-76) and prebendary of St Paul's Cathedral London (1973-86)
- 1975-1976 Michael Harold Champneys
- 1976-1992 Fredrick Mark Rollinson
- 1992-1996 John David Marshall Peton
- 1997-2000 John Arthur Webber
- 2001–present Brian Charles Ralph

== Activities ==
The PCC of St Barnabas Bethnal Green has been affiliated to the Lesbian and Gay Christian Movement since 2006 and is only the second congregation to have affiliated as a body.

From 2003 to 2012, the church played a key role in St Barnabas Community Fete (also known as Bowstock), whose director was the church's vicar, Father Brian Ralph.
