= Bow Curve =

Railway line in Bow, East London

Overview
- Status: Operational
- Owner: Network Rail
- Locale: Greater London
- Coordinates: 51.5270°N 0.0227°W
- Termini: Gas Factory Junction; Bow Junction
- Stations: 0 (1 disused)

Service
- Type: Commuter rail
- System: National Rail
- Services: No services timetabled

History
- Opened: 2 April 1849

Technical
- Track length: 47 chains (0.95 km)
- Number of tracks: 1
- Track gauge: 4 ft 8 1/2 in (1,435 mm) standard gauge

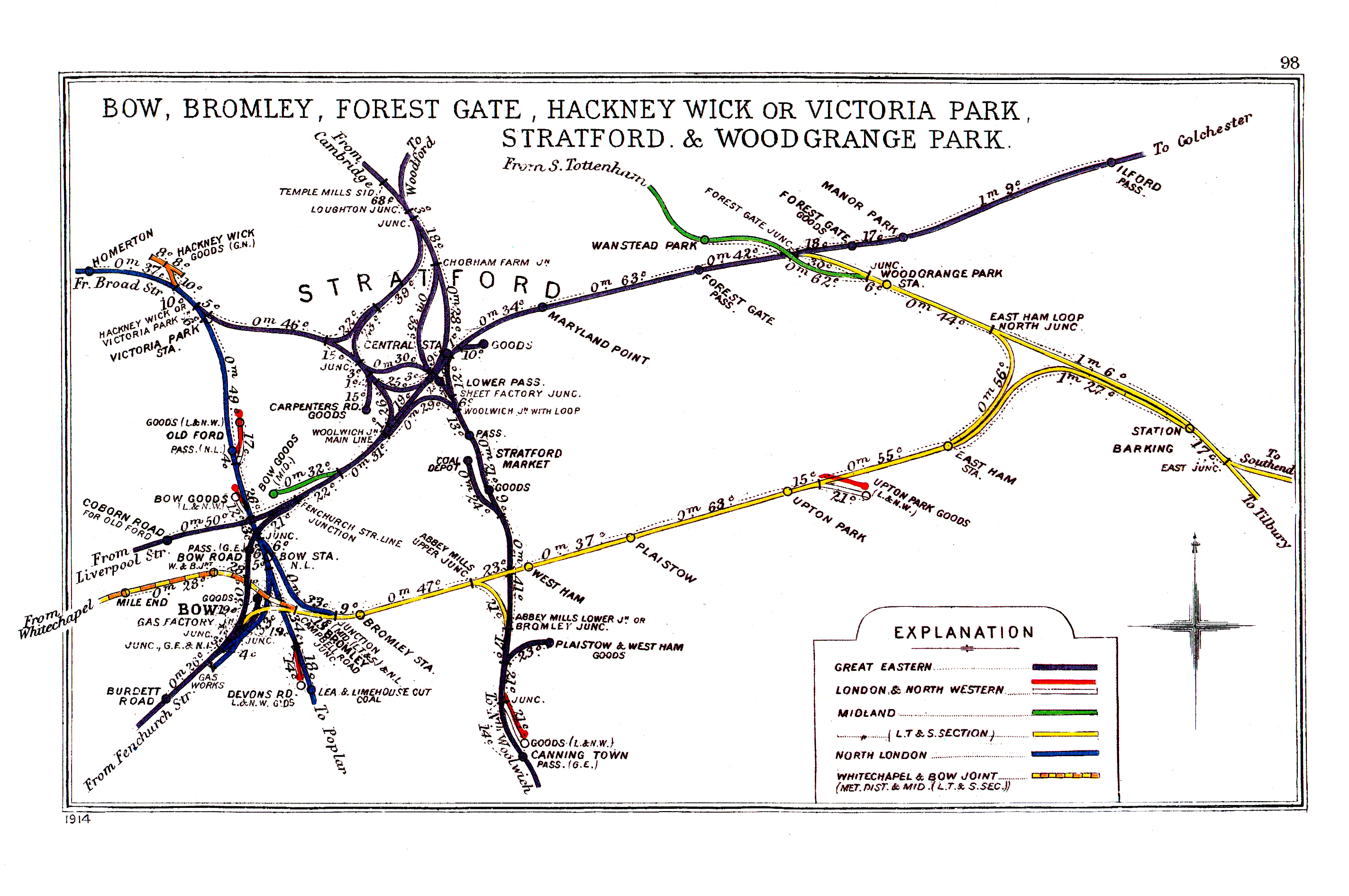
The Bow Curve on a 1914 Railway Clearing House map (lower left, the purple line between "Gas Factory Junc." and "Fenchurch Str. Line Junc.")

The Bow Curve is a railway branch line in Bow, east London, that connects the Great Eastern Main Line (from Liverpool Street) and the London, Tilbury and Southend line (from Fenchurch Street). The line, 47 chains (0.95 km) in length, connects Bow Junciton on the GEML with Gas Factory Junction on the LTSR.

It was originally part of the London and Blackwall Extension Railway and had one intermediate station called Bow Road, but today, no regular timetabled services run on this line. It can, however, be used for diversions during engineering work or emergency timetable changes.

== History ==
The line was opened by the London and Blackwall Extension Railway (LBER) on 2 April 1849 and is built on a viaduct between Gas Factory Junction on the LTSR and Bow Junction on the GEML.

When the line first opened, the only intermediate station was at Bow and Bromley, however this closed the following year. It was later rebuilt and reopened as Bow Road on 1 October 1876. The station was re-sited on 4 April 1892, and was located 3 miles 7 chains (5.0 km) down-line from Fenchurch Street. On 21 April 1941 Bow Road was closed due to bomb damage sustained during the Blitz but re-opened on 9 December 1946. It closed between 6 January and 6 October 1947 so that a number of alterations could be made. The line was electrified at this point and the original intention was to run shuttle services between Stratford and Fenchurch Street via Limehouse.

Following nationalisation of the railways in 1948, the line became part of the Eastern Region of British Rail. It was later decided to withdraw passenger services from the line and Bow Road station was permanently closed on 7 November 1949. The line remains open for diversions.

The route was reduced to a single track in c. 1986 to allow the Docklands Light Railway's Poplar-Stratford branch to share the alignment north of the station.
