= Hatford =

Village in Oxfordshire, England

Coordinates: 51.651°N 01.512°W

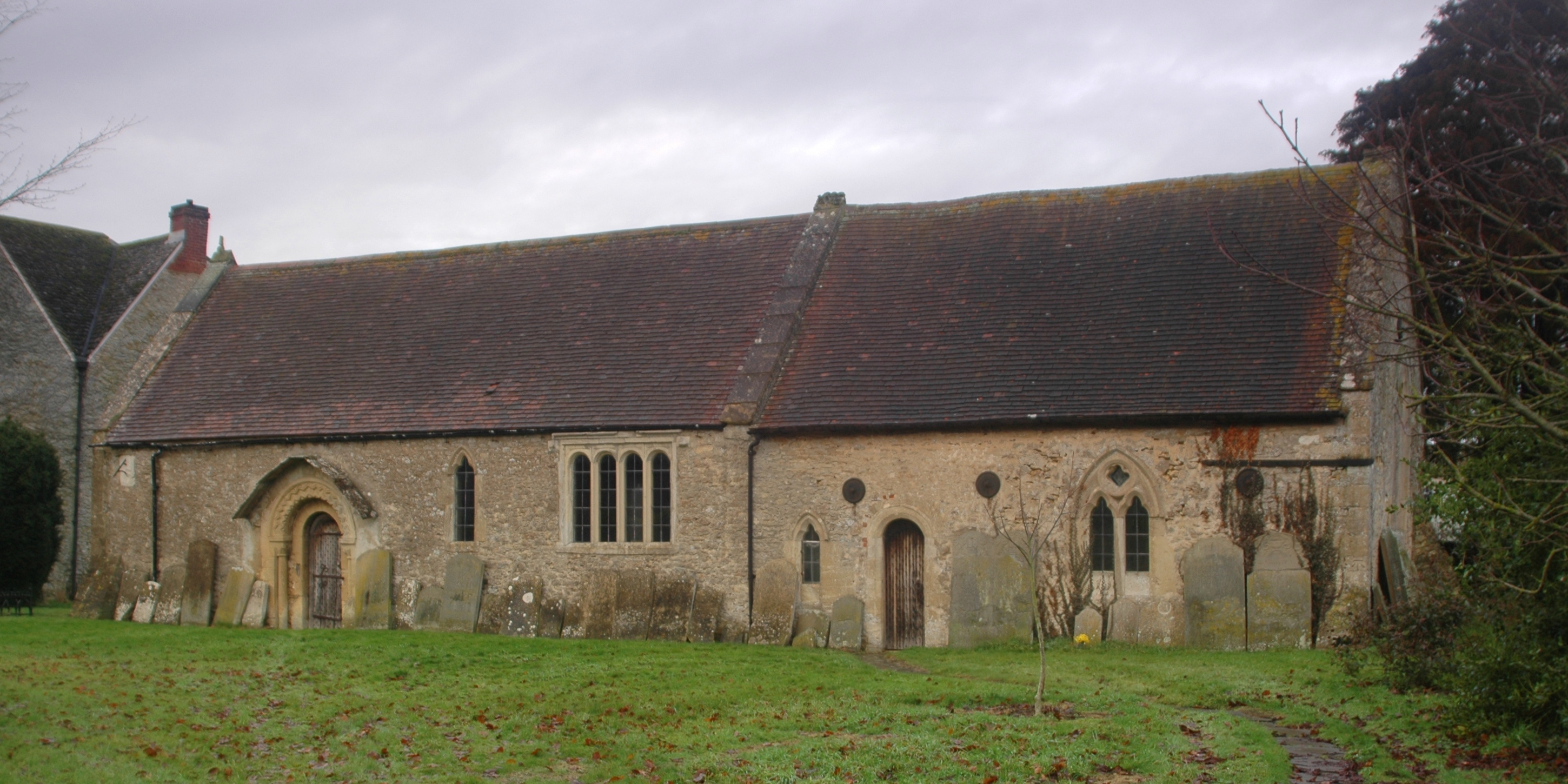
- St George's parish church

- Location within Oxfordshire
- Population: 98 (2001 census)
- OS grid reference: SU3394
- Civil parish: Hatford
- District: Vale of White Horse
- Shire county: Oxfordshire
- Region: South East
- Country: England
- Sovereign state: United Kingdom
- Post town: Faringdon
- Postcode district: SN7
- Police: Thames Valley
- Fire: Oxfordshire
- Ambulance: South Central
- UK Parliament: Didcot and Wantage

Hatford is a village and civil parish of some 1,000 acres (400 ha) in the Vale of White Horse. It was part of Berkshire until the 1974 boundary changes transferred it to Oxfordshire.

== Amenities ==
As Hatford is so small it has almost no amenities. Hatford has no village shop and no public house. There was an off-licence until the Second World War, until this received a direct hit from a German bomb (see below).

== Geography ==
The sandstone soil is a rich source of sand and gravel. Sand has been extracted here for many years and it was during quarrying, between 1937 and 1958, that an early Iron Age settlement was discovered. The lane leading north out of the village is called Sandy Lane.

== History ==
The earliest evidence of human habitation is a Bronze Age spearhead, found near the river Hat. Signs of an early Iron Age settlement have also been found and there is thought to have been at least one Roman villa, in fields next to the present village. Despite its long history, the population of Hatford has not changed much in size since the time of the Domesday Book, when it had some 120 residents.

Hatford has had two Anglican parish churches. The later of these, the church of the Holy Trinity (built in 1873–4 to a design by William Wigginton) became finally deconsecrated and sold in 1972, for use as a private dwelling. The older Saint George's was reopened & reinstated as a place of worship in the same year; reroofed in 1973 and reglazed in 1974. St George's stands on the site of the Saxon church mentioned in the Domesday Book of 1086. It is mostly Early English Gothic, with a Norman south doorway to the nave and chancel arch and a Norman font. One Saxon window is still visible and there is a sundial carved into the stone near the doorway.

The manor house, next to St George's parish church, has an 18th-century front but parts of the house date from the 15th century. It stands at the western approach to the village and has an uninterrupted view of the Berkshire Downs and the Uffington White Horse. On the other side of St George's is the rectory. Next to the rectory, facing the B4508 road through the village, is Hatford Cottage, which was converted into a single house from a row of very early cottages. It was an antique shop in the 1960s.

On 29 April 1555 Anne Dudley, the widowed Countess of Warwick, and Sir Edward Unton of Wadley House were married at St George's. Anne was the daughter of Edward Seymour, the Duke of Somerset and niece to Jane Seymour, who married King Henry VIII. In 1643, during the English Civil War, the parish register records the burials of two soldiers killed in action. The old village off-licence received a direct hit from a German bomb in September 1940. One village girl was killed, as well as two young London boys, who had been evacuated to stay with their grandparents, in order to escape the Blitz.

== Literary connection ==
The Wiltshire thresher turned poet, Stephen Duck, worked here in the early 19th century and commemorated life on a Hatford Farm in one of his last poems.

== Gallery ==
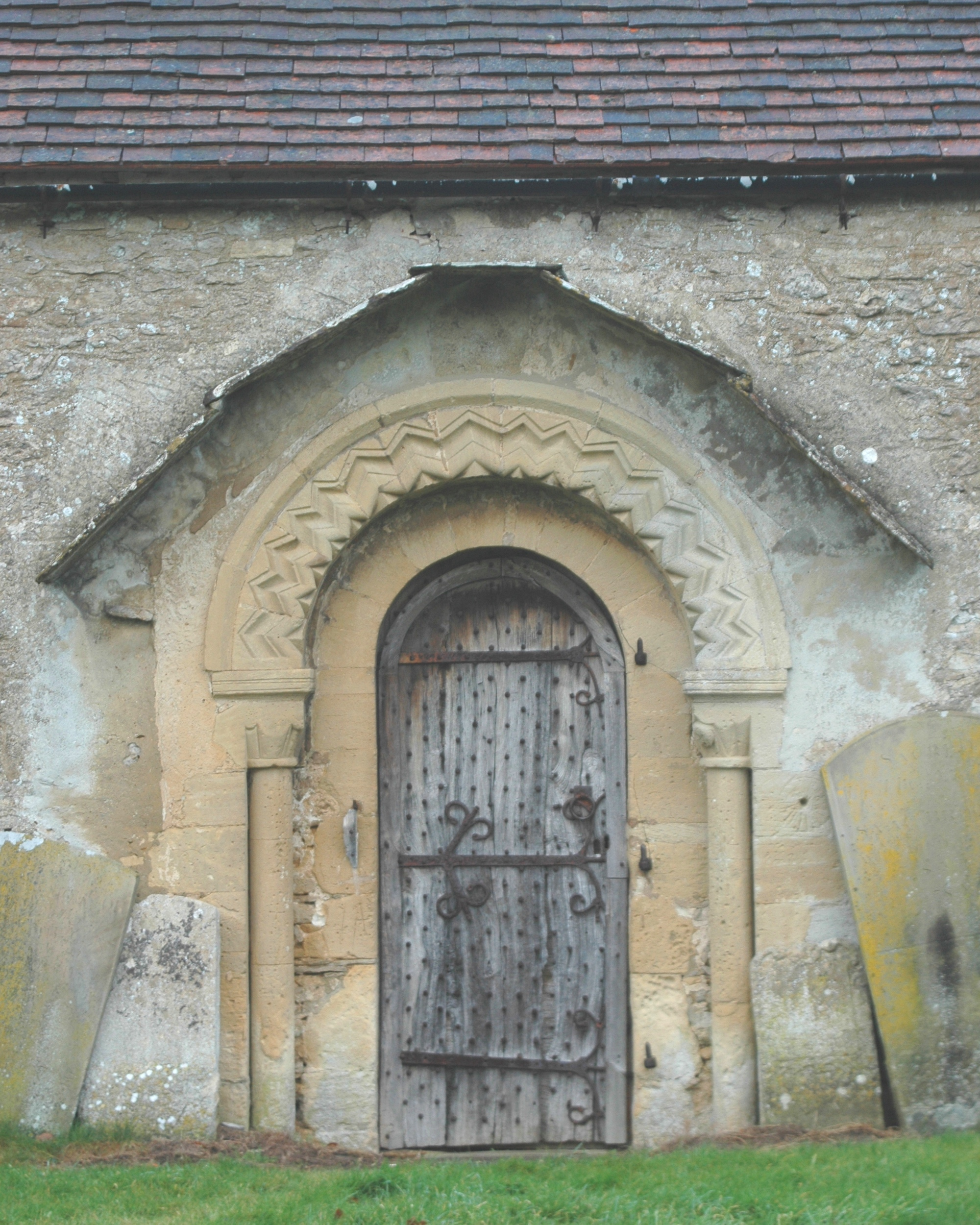
Norman south doorway of St George's parish church

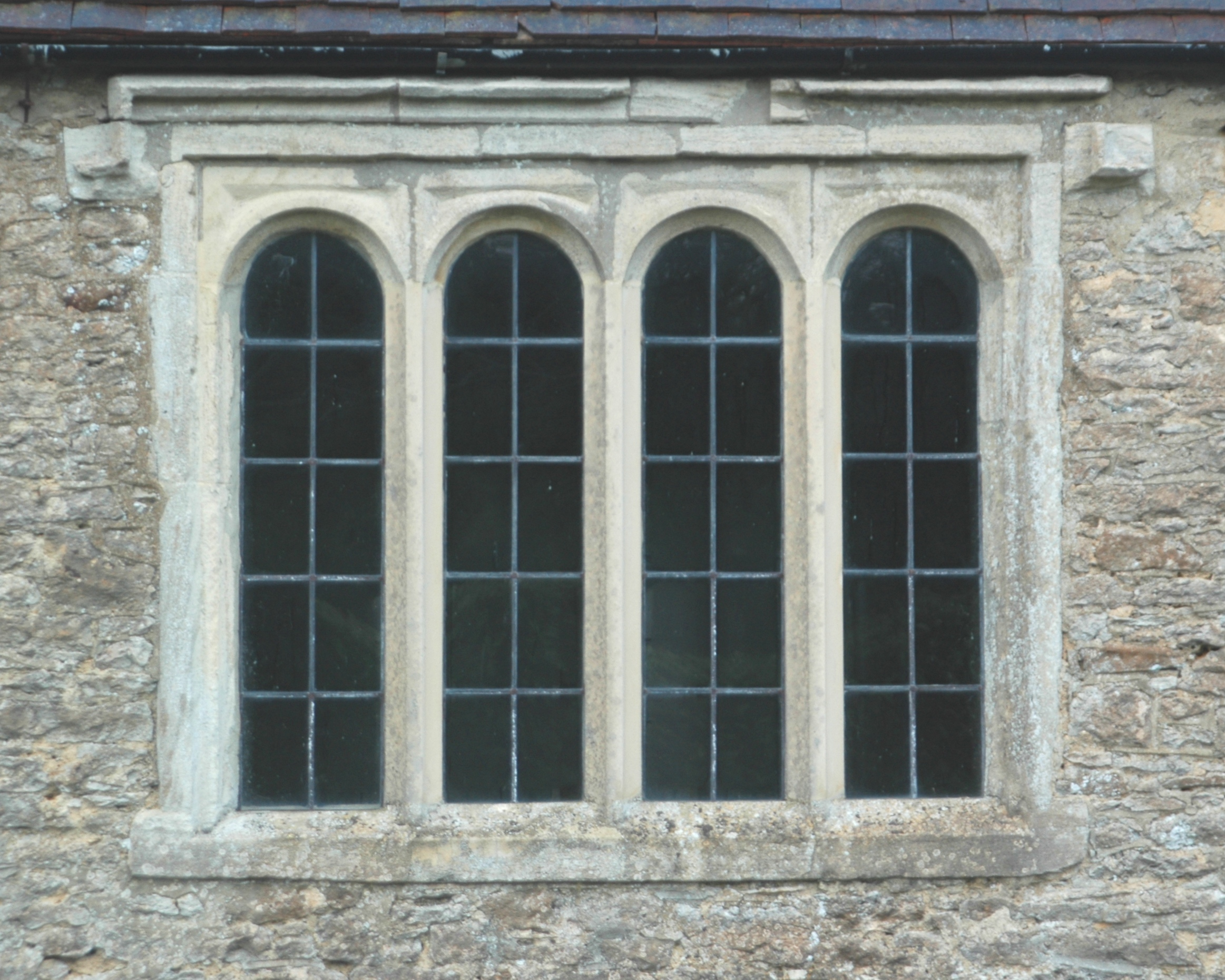
Four-light window in St George's parish church

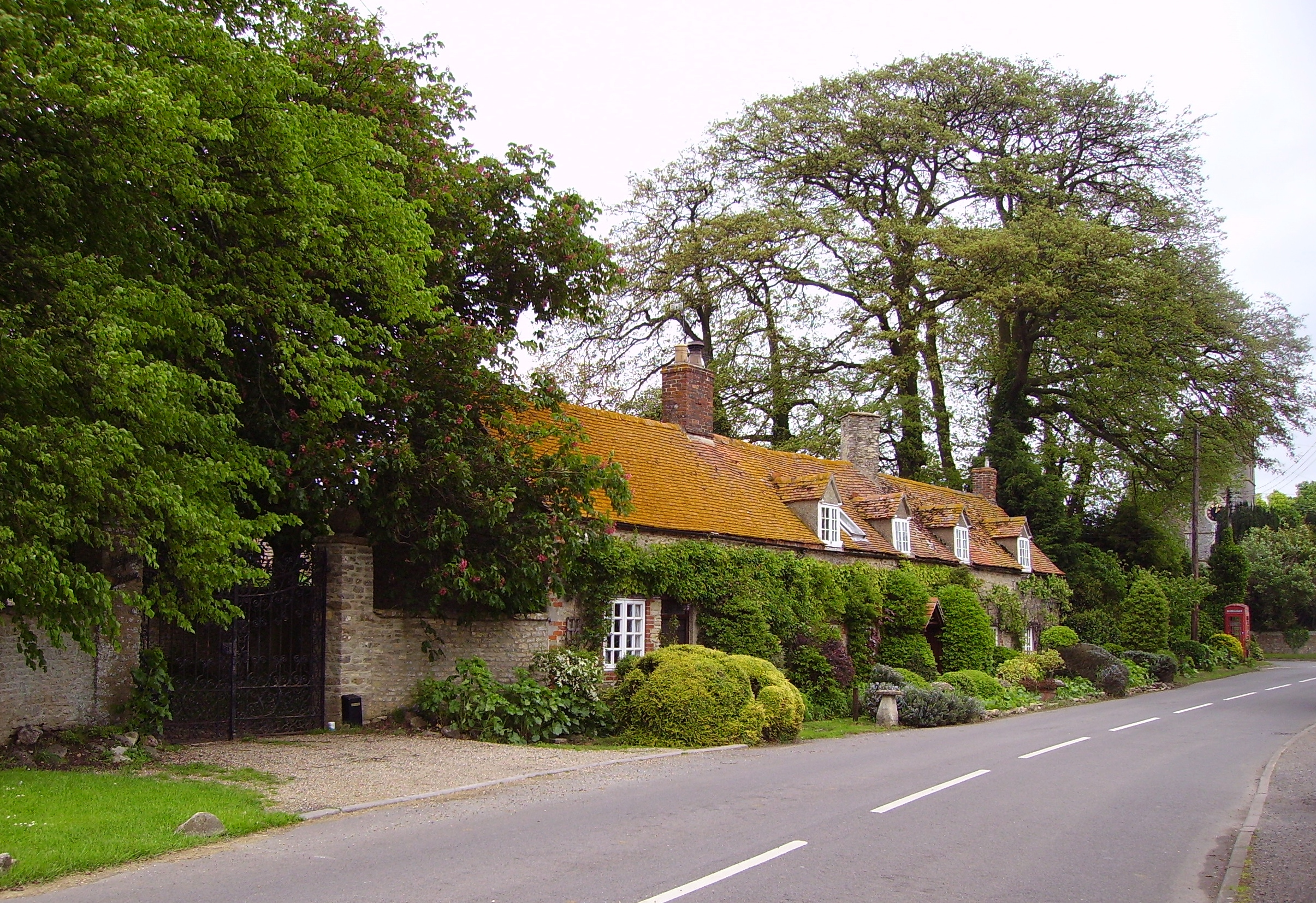
Hatford Cottage, with the former Holy Trinity parish church to the right
