= Charles Lutyens =

English artist and art therapist (1933–2021)

- Photograph of Charles Lutyens
- Born: 1933; London, England
- Died: April 2021 (age 87)
- Education: Bryanston School
- Alma mater: Chelsea School of Art; Slade School of Fine Art; Saint Martin's School of Art
- Known for: Mosaic; oil painting; sculpture
- Notable work: Angels of the Heavenly Host (1963–68); The Outraged Christ (2011)
- Style: Figurative art
- Spouses: Ariane Laparra (m. 1958; div. 1961) Marianna Lutyens (m. 1970)
- Children: 4 children
- Parents: Ernest Lutyens (father); Naomi (nee Harben) Lutyens (mother)
- Relatives: Edwin Lutyens (great uncle)
- Patrons: St Paul's, Bow Common; Liverpool Cathedral
- Website: charleslutyens.co.uk

Charles Lutyens (1933–2021) was an English artist and art therapist.

Lutyens was born in London, England. His father was Ernest Lutyens, an officer in the Coldstream Guards, and his mother was Naomi Lutyens, who was a publicity officer at the Old Vic Theatre in south London. Lutyens was educated at Bryanston School in Dorset, where he decided to become an artist. He then studied art at the Chelsea School of Art, Slade School of Fine Art, and Saint Martin's School of Art in London, where he studied oil painting and sculpture. Subsequently, at the age of 24, he studied in Paris under the cubist painter André Lhote. He worked mainly using oil paint, but also mosaic and sculpture using clay, stone, and wood. After his studies, in 1958, Lutyens joined the "Fabyc" ("Families by Choice") community, a kibbutz-style group of people living in London, with his studio in Fulham.

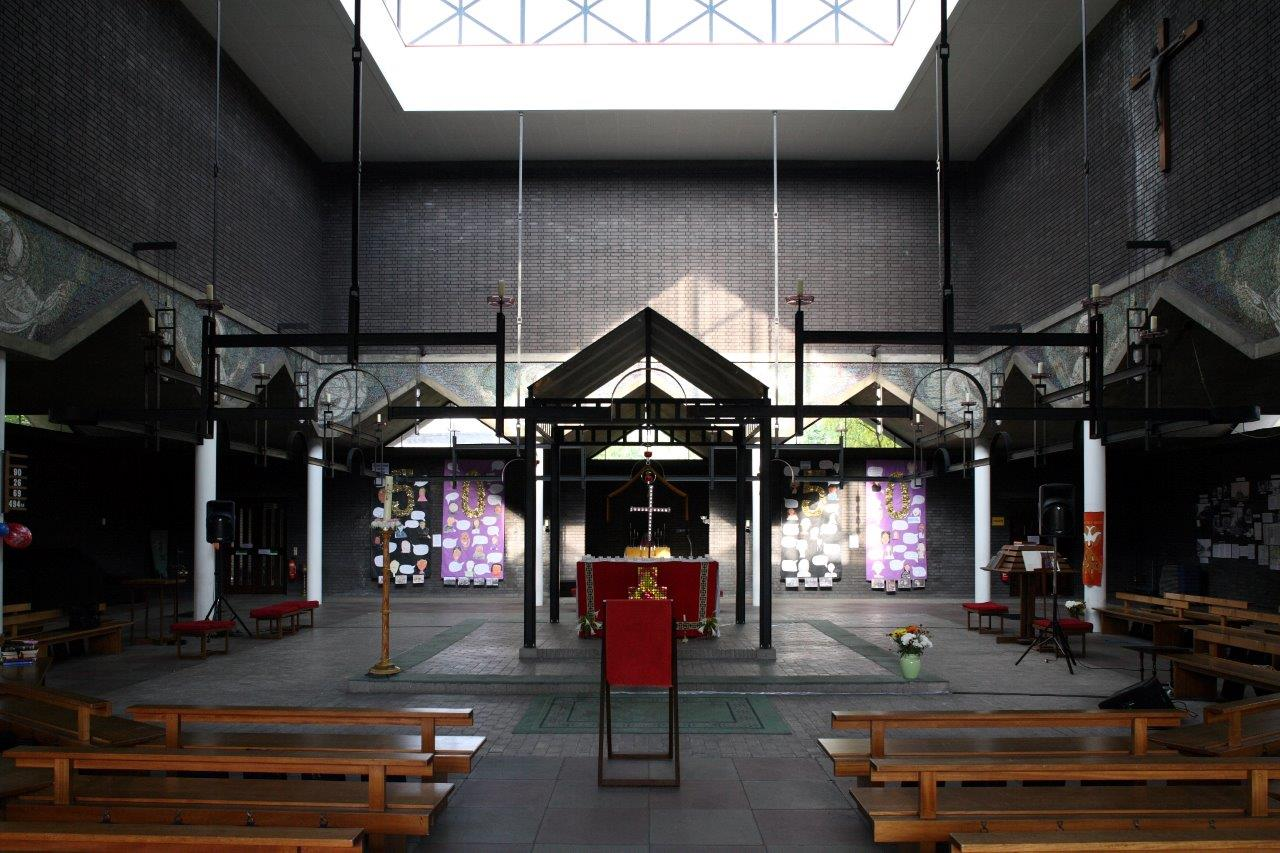
Interior view of St Paul's, Bow Common, including Lutyens' Angels of the Heavenly Host mosaic mural around the walls above the pillars

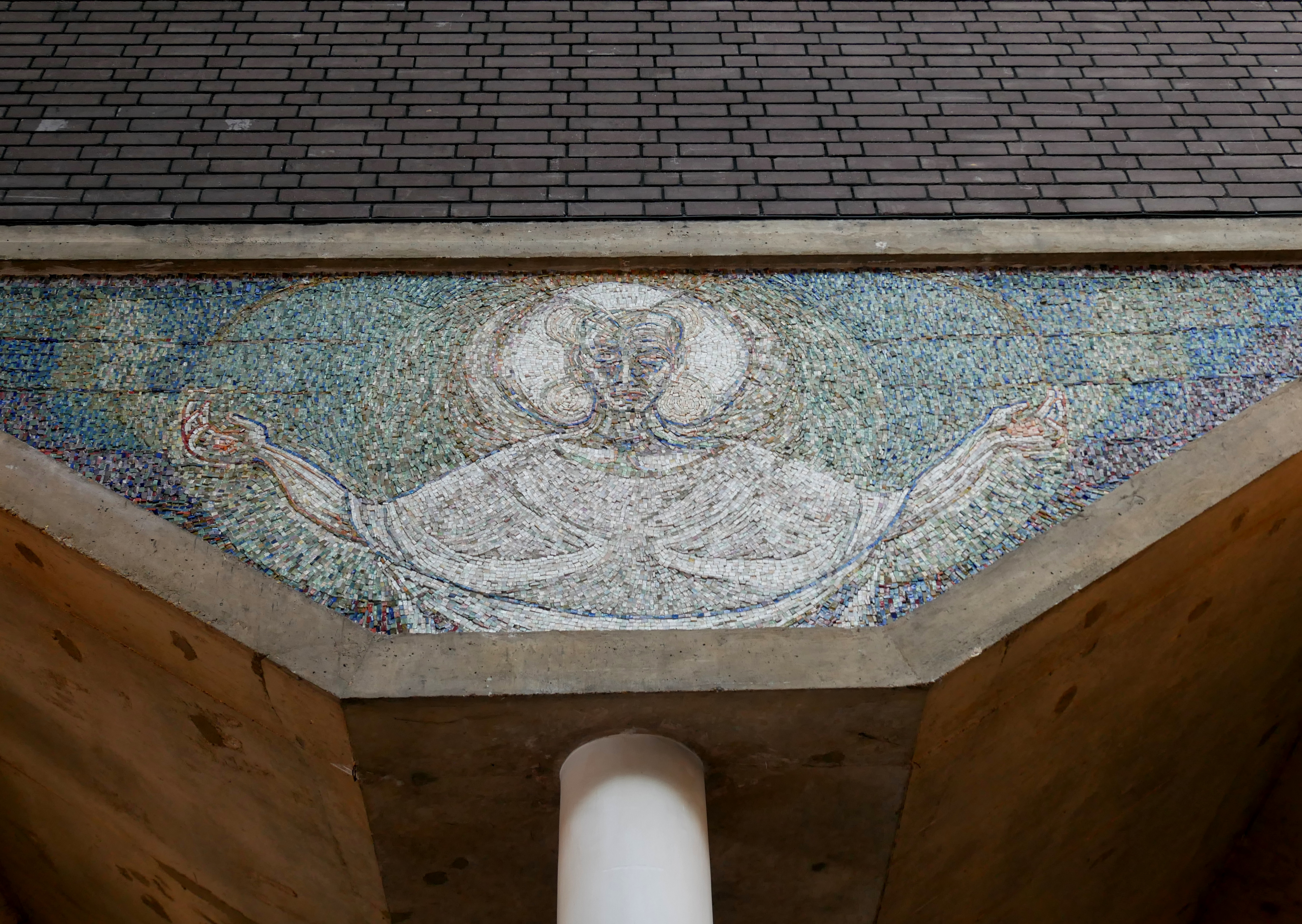
Detail of an angel in the Angels of the Heavenly Host mosaic

He worked on a large 800 square-foot mosaic mural, Angels of the Heavenly Host, during 1963–68, at the newly consecrated St Paul's Church, Bow. This was undertaken in collaboration with the church's architect Robert Maguire and Keith Murray, designer and partner in Maguire and Murray. Gerry Adler says that Murray designed the mosaics which were executed by Lutyens. The mosaic used tesserae consisting of 700 different colours sourced by Lutyens from the island of Murano, near Venice and known for its glass-making. It is probably the largest contemporary mosaic in Britain and the largest created by one person.

Lutyens moved away from the Fabyc community in London to Oxford in 1978. Having trained for a diploma in art therapy at the Hertfordshire College of Art and Design in St Alban's, he worked as an art therapist at Oxford's Radcliffe Hospital, the Littlemore Hospital, and Harlow House in High Wycombe.

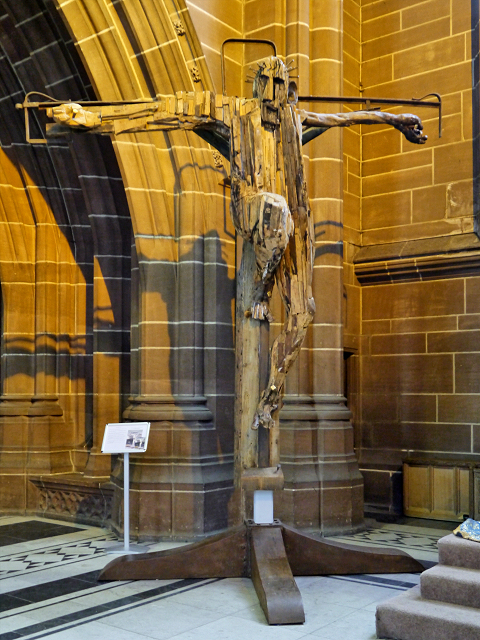
The Outraged Christ sculpture in Liverpool Cathedral

His 15-foot wooden, iron, and steel crucifixion sculpture The Outraged Christ of 2011 was exhibited at St Paul's in Bow, then at Gloucester Cathedral, and finally more permanently at Liverpool Cathedral in the Derby Transept.

He had a studio in Charlton-on-Otmoor, a village in Oxfordshire. He exhibited in joint and individual exhibitions, for example at the Hollerhaus Gallery in Munich (Germany), St Martin's Gallery in London, and the Wildenstein Gallery in New York. His work is held in private collections in France, Germany, Republic of Ireland, Spain, United Kingdom, United States, and Zimbabwe. In 2024, a retrospective exhibition of Lutyens' oil paintings in the context of his work as an art therapist, A World Apart: The Work of Charles Lutyens, was held at the Bethlem Museum of the Mind in Beckenham, southeast London.

Lutyens was married twice, first to Ariane Laparra (1958–61) and later to Marianna Rothauer-Ennser (1970–2021). He had two children from each marriage.
