= Rose Finn-Kelcey =

British artist

- Born: 4 March 1945; Northampton, England
- Died: 13 February 2014 (aged 68); London, England
- Website: rosefinn-kelcey.com

Rose Finn-Kelcey (4 March 1945 – 13 February 2014) was a British artist, born in Northampton. Finn-Kelcey grew up in Buckinghamshire as part of a large farming family, and went on to study at Ravensbourne College of Art and Design, and later Chelsea College of Art in London. She died on 13 February 2014 of motor neurone disease. She lived and worked in London from 1968.

Finn-Kelcey worked in a variety of media including performance, video, sound, installation, sculpture, photography, papercut and posters.

== Early work ==
Finn-Kelcey's work in the late 1960s and 1970s emerged alongside that of increasing numbers of artists concerned with formal experimentation and conceptual practices. Several of the early works consisted of making and flying flags in publicly visible spaces, as in Power for the People (1972). In this piece, Finn-Kelcey made large flags from silver tissue and black bunting bearing the slogan 'POWER FOR THE PEOPLE', which were hung from Battersea Power Station in London. Commissioned by the Central Electricity Generating Board, the flags were removed due to complaints from Chelsea residents across the river.

Finn-Kelcey's work, like that of many artists she shared gallery space with, was also engaged in dialogues surrounding social liberation movements during this time. For instance, The Restless Image: a discrepancy between the seen position and the felt position (1975), now owned by Tate, in which Finn-Kelcey is posed in a hand-stand on a beach, interconnects with feminist critiques of the woman as 'seen' whilst the title simultaneously draws attention to the shallowness of the viewer's gaze in the invisibility of the 'felt'. Finn-Kelcey's work also appeared in exhibitions and spaces with explicitly feminist agendas, for instance she performed Mind The Gap as part of About Time: video, performance and installation by 21 women artists within the 'women's season' at the Institute of Contemporary Arts in the winter of 1980.

Examples of artists Finn-Kelcey exhibited alongside during the 1970s include Carlyle Reedy, Paul Burwell, Tina Keane and David Medalla, all of whom featured in the London Calling presents Performance Plus exhibition in which Finn-Kelcey performed The Boilermaker's Assistant. Finn-Kelcey also had some involvement in the Artists For Democracy project, which was chaired by Medalla and based in Fitzrovia, London.

== Work since the 1980s ==
In 1987 Finn-Kelcey exhibited what Guy Brett describes as one of her 'best-known works', Bureau de Change at Matt's Gallery in East London. The piece consisted of £1000 in coins arranged to resemble Vincent Van Gogh's Still Life: Vase with Fifteen Sunflowers (1888), viewable from a platform and watched over by a security guard and surveillance cameras. Created in response to the £22.5m sale of the Van Gogh original, Brett described Finn-Kelcey's work as 'an argument in the form of an object. No words are necessary.'

Her installation 'Angel' covered the facade of St Paul's Bow Common from February to July 2004. Commissioned by Art and Sacred Places, it was the joint winner of the 2007/2008 ACE Award for ‘Art in a Religious Context’.

Whilst she has been described as 'one of the most imaginative and inventive artists of her generation', and 'central' to the emerging artistic communities to which her work contributed, Finn-Kelcey never had a solo exhibition in any of the major public galleries in London (with the possible exception of a performance work at the Serpentine in 1983). A comprehensive monograph of her work was published by Ridinghouse in 2013 shortly prior to her falling ill.

A major retrospective exhibition of her work titled Power of the People was staged posthumous at Firstsite in Colchester in 2018.
