= William Wigginton =

English architect

William Wigginton (1826–1890) was an English architect. Born in Eton, Berkshire, he worked in Derby and Dudley before moving to London in 1860. He published proposals for working-class housing, and designed several Gothic Revival churches in London, often featuring polychrome brickwork.

== Life ==
Wigginton was born at Eton on 22 August 1826, the son of W.L. Wigginton. He worked an architect in Derby and Dudley before moving to London in 1860, where he ran his practice from in Cornhill in the City. He was the Derby agent of the British Fire and Life Assurance Company. He became an Associate of the Royal Institute of British Architects in 1854 and a Fellow in 1857.

He was the author of Sanitary Reform: Model Town Dwellings for the Industrious Classes (1850) and a 36-page pamphlet entitled The Late Archidiaconal Visitation of Bromsgrove and the Injustice and Illegality of Visitation Fees. A two volume work called England's Operative Homes was announced in 1851. His plans for working class housing, as exhibited at a bookseller's in Derby in 1850, envisaged a block built around three sides of a quadrangle, with three storeys, each accommodating fifteen families. The dwellings were designed to be entirely fireproof, and ventilated by a system of Wigginton's own invention. Access to the upper floors was to be via two stone staircases, leading to open balconies which were carried around the quadrangle at each level.

He was one of six candidates shortlisted for the post of architect and surveyor to the London School Board in 1871. The post went to E.R. Robson.

Wigginton was a freemason, and a member of the Volunteer Corps, receiving a commission as Lieutenant-Colonel of the 1st Tower Hamlets Artillery, which he resigned on 29 October 1873. He died at his home, Buckhurst, Forest Hill, on 8 January 1890 and was buried in the family vault at Dudley.

== Works ==
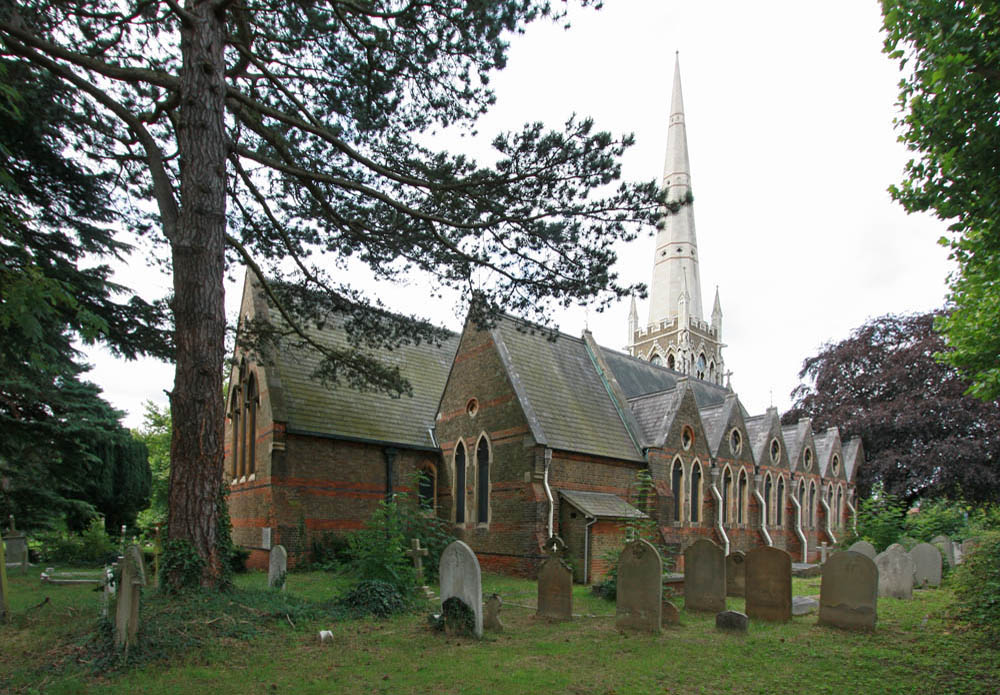
St James, Hampton Hill. The tower is not by Wigginton.

- Chapels at Smethwick Cemetery (1857).
- New Model Dwellings, Block Lane, Dudley (1854).
- Rose Hill Schools, Dudley, for the New Connection Methodist Church (1859).
- Drinking fountain, Oswestry (1862).
- Design for the Wedgwood Institute, Burslem (unbuilt), shown at the International Exhibition in South Kensington, 1862.
- St. Paul, Virginia Row, Bethnal Green (1863–64). Stock brick building, with bands of red and black, seating 900. Chancel, aisled nave, north-east tower. Damaged by bombing during the Second World War and demolished in 1951.
- St James' Church, Hampton Hill (1863–64). Yellow stock brick Gothic Revival building with red brick and stone dressing. Enlarged by Wigginton himself in 1878–9. The tower was added by Romaine Walker and Tanner in 1888.
- All Saints, Leyton Consecrated January 1865. A cruciform brick building in the Decorated Gothic style with a long narrow chancel, low walls and steeply pitched roofs. Demolished and replaced c.1971.
- Plans for a church school at Cressing, Essex (1865).
- St. Paul, Old Charlton (1865–67)) Damaged during the Second World War and later demolished.
- St Barnabas, Grove Road, Bow (1865). Built as a Baptist chapel but consecrated for the Church of England in 1870. Gothic, built in yellow brick, banded with red and black. Damaged during the Second World War; the steeple was later removed and the church rebuilt, retaining the tower and north and south walls.
- St Mary's National Schools, Walthamstow (1866).
- Dutch Church Almshouses, Charlton (1868). Demolished 1970s.
- St. John the Baptist, Cleveland Road and Downham Road, Islington (1871–72). A brick and stone church, in an early Decorated Gothic style. Aisled nave and chancel, with a semi-octagonal apse; designed to accommodate more than 700. Damaged during the Second World War, declared redundant in 1971 and demolished by 1981.
- Christ Church, Rendlesham Road, Clapton (1871). A brick building with stone dressings in the Decorated Gothic style, seating around 700; chancel, north and south chapels, aisled nave with clerestories, bellcote; interior of variegated brickwork. Demolished following bomb damage during the Second World War. Wigginton won the commission following a limited competition.
- Christ Church, Gore Road, South Hackney (1871). A brick building with stone dressings in the Decorated Gothic style, seating 850; apsidal chancel, aisled nave with clerestories. Demolished following bomb damage during the Second World War.
- Warehouse for Cohen, Jacobs & Co, Ely Place, Holborn, London (1872)
- St. Mary's vicarage, Hinckley, Leicestershire (1872–73). Demolished 1967.
- Holy Trinity, Hatford, Berkshire (1873–74). Now a private house.
