= Spring Harvest =

Annual evangelical conference

- Founded: 1979; 47 years ago
- Founders: Clive Calver; Peter Meadows
- Type: Charitable organisation, company limited by guarantee, nonprofit
- Headquarters: Uckfield, East Sussex
- Location: Uckfield, England
- Region served: United Kingdom
- CEO: Phil Loose
- Key people: Martin Young (chair); Cris Rogers (chair of the event planning group)
- Revenue: ▲£4,819,854 (2016)
- Employees: 28 (2022)
- Website: springharvest.org

Spring Harvest is an inter-denominational evangelical conference and gathering in the United Kingdom that started in 1979.

The festival arose in the late 1970s at a time when evangelicalism was growing in the UK and there was uncertainty as to how that movement would relate with Church of England and evangelicals within it; the event, among few others at the time, welcomed all evangelical Christians, including people within and outside the charismatic movement. Hylson-Smith comments that non-denominational activities such as Spring Harvest did much to encourage pan-evangelicalism which tended to minimise historical differences between denominations

Its stated aims are to "equip the Church for action" through a range of events, conferences, books and resources. The tone is evangelical with modern worship music, workshops and seminars.

== History ==
The event was first held in 1979 for one week at Prestatyn, North Wales. In 1986, the event moved to Butlins Minehead, and in 1987, it moved to Skegness. Total cumulative attendance passed the 50,000 mark in 1988. The following year, it was also held at Butlin's Ayr, Scotland. By 2010 the event had been reduced by a week from the previous year, and the 2011 attendance was approximately 28,000 people. From 2012, there were three Minehead weeks and one Skegness week. From 2014 to 2017, the events continued to reduce in length. In 2018 Harrogate Convention Centre was first used as a venue.

== Worship music production and media coverage ==
Recordings of parts of the event sometimes appears on British TV such as the BBC programme Songs of Praise. In most years up to 2020, CDs of the associated songs are published. In 2022, this moved to Spotify.
