= Michael Peet =

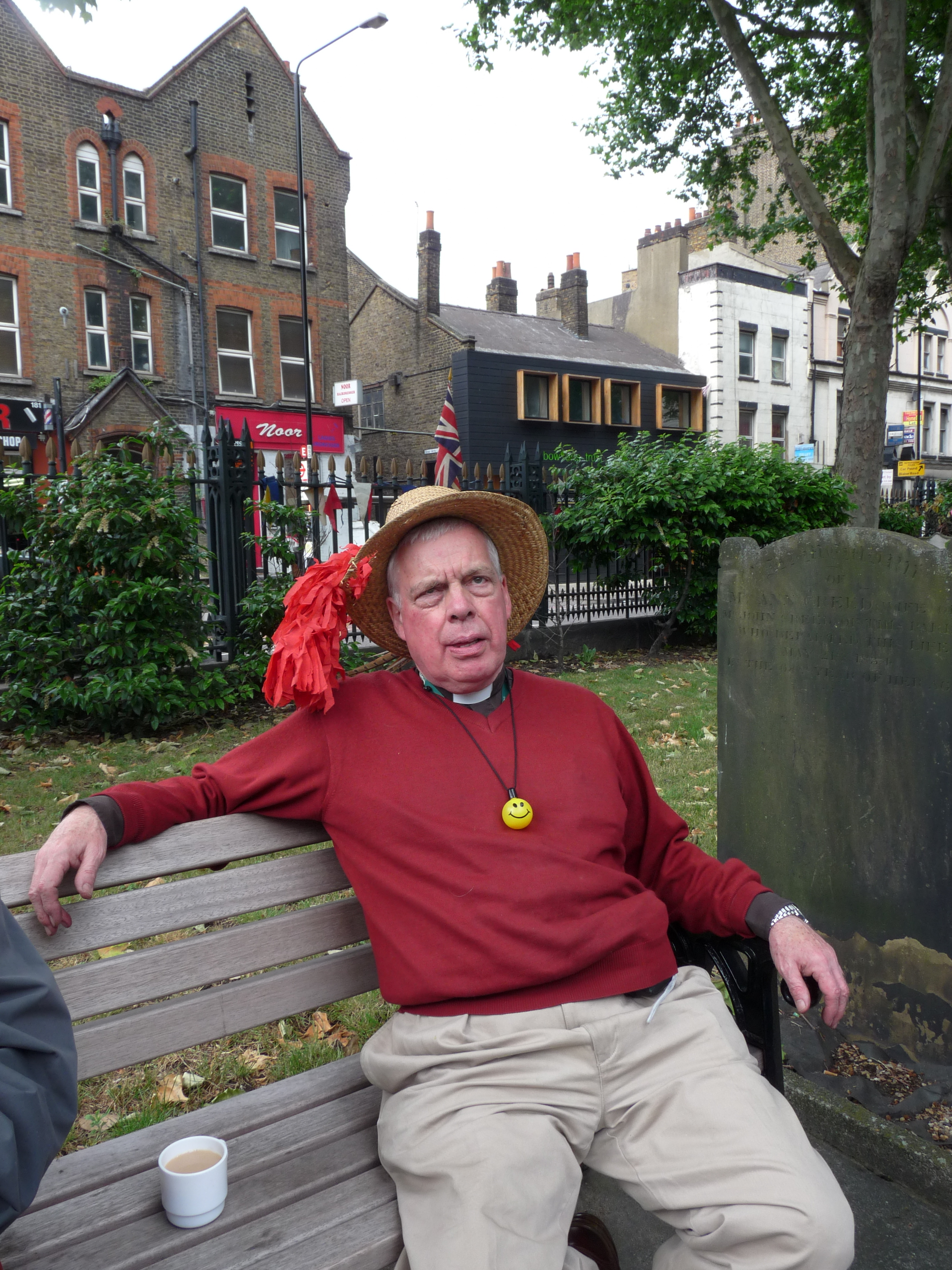
Michael Peet

Michael Peet (died April 9, 2011) was a founder member of the Lesbian and Gay Christian Movement and was the rector at Bow Church for 22 years.

He wrote Seven Parishioners of Stratford Bow and was involved in the plans for the 700th anniversary of Bow Church.
