= Gresham Kirkby =

English Anglican priest and anarchist communist (1916–2006)

The Reverend Gresham Kirkby
- Born: Reginald Gresham Kirkby; 11 August 1916; Cornwall, England
- Died: 10 August 2006 (aged 89)
- Education: University of Leeds; College of the Resurrection
- Religion: Christianity (Anglican)
- Church: Church of England
- Ordained: 1942 (deacon); 1943 (priest)
- Congregations served: St Paul's, Bow Common

Reginald Gresham Kirkby (11 August 1916 – 10 August 2006) was an English Anglican priest and anarchist socialist.

== Biography ==
Reginald Gresham Kirkby was born in Cornwall on 11 August 1916. His mother and aunt were Methodist, but he was inclined towards Anglo-Catholicism from an early age. Kirby graduated from the University of Leeds and studied at the College of the Resurrection, Mirfield, West Yorkshire, where he became friends with Trevor Huddleston, in the 1940s. He was ordained in Manchester as a deacon in 1942 and as a priest in 1943 and served as vicar of St Paul's, Bow Common, London, from July 1951 to July 1994.

Kirby was an anarchist socialist (or anarcho-communist), an early supporter of the Campaign for Nuclear Disarmament, and a member of the Committee of 100. He was influenced by Peter Kropotkin and Dorothy Day, co-founder of the Catholic Worker Movement.

Kirkby died on 10 August 2006.

== Works ==
- "Kingdom Come: The Catholic Faith and Millennial Hopes". In Leech, Kenneth; Williams, Rowan. Essays Catholic and Radical. London: Bowerdean Press. 1983. Accessed 10 January 2019.

== See also ==
- Christian communism
- Christian socialism
