= Devons Road DLR station =

Docklands Light Railway station

Devons Road
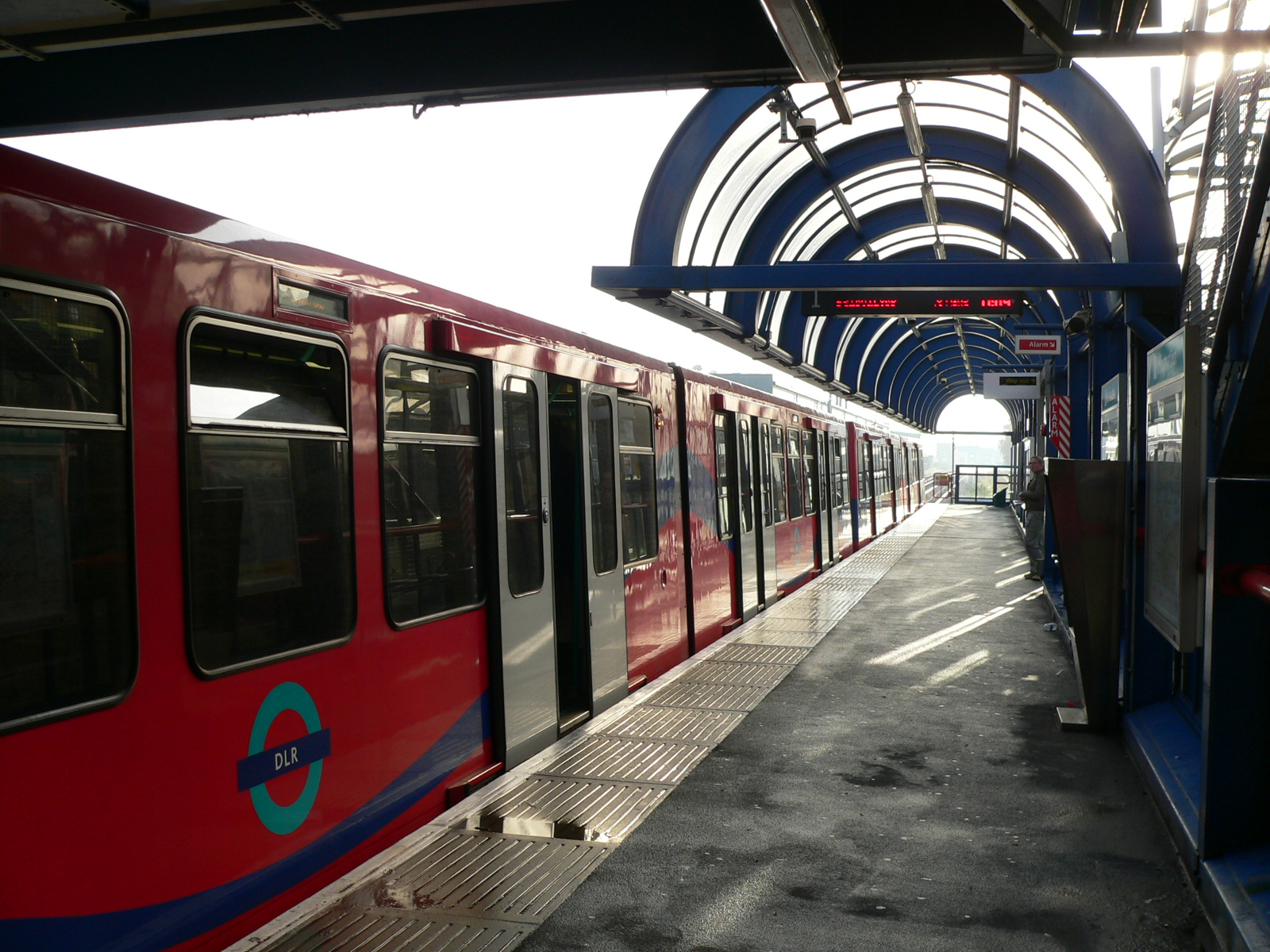
- The blue half barrel platform canopies are contemporary with the station opening

General information
- Location: Bromley-by-Bow, Tower Hamlets
- Coordinates: 51.5223°N 0.0174°W
- Owned by: Transport for London
- Managed by: Docklands Light Railway
- Platforms: 2

Construction
- Structure type: At-grade
- Accessible: Yes

Other information
- Status: Unstaffed
- Fare zone: 2
- Website: Edit this at Wikidata

History
- Opened: 31 August 1987

Passengers

DLR annual entry and exit
- 2020: ▼1.419 million
- 2021: ▲1.447 million
- 2022: ▲2.170 million
- 2023: ▲2.410 million
- 2024: ▼2.34 million
Location
- Location in Tower Hamlets

Devons Road is a Docklands Light Railway (DLR) station located in Bromley-by-Bow. The station takes its name from Devons Road and is between Langdon Park and Bow Church stations. It is on the Stratford–Poplar branch of the DLR, with services continuing on to Canary Wharf and Lewisham. The station opened with the DLR system on 31 August 1987 and is a rare example of the preserved distinctive architectural design of the first stations. It is in London fare zone 2.

== History ==
=== North London Railway ===
The first railway through the site of the station was the Bow–Poplar branch of the North London Railway (NLR), built in 1851 and opened on 1 January 1852. The line was opened initially for freight only. To the east were the Devons Road engine sheds and to the south was the Devons Road Goods Depot of the London and North Western Railway.

Passenger service through the site commenced on 1 August 1866. The nearest stations on the line were Bow (Note: Bow was first served 26 September 1850 and last served 15 May 1944.) to the north and Poplar (East India Road) (Note: Poplar (East India Road) was first served 1 August 1866 and last served 15 May 1944.) to the south. An infill station at South Bromley opened to the south on 1 September 1884. The line to Poplar was closed to passengers on 15 May 1944, during the Second World War. The line continued to be used for declining freight traffic until 5 October 1981 and the track lifted by 13 May 1985.

=== Docklands Light Railway ===
In the 1980s, consideration was being given to improving transport in the London Docklands. Various schemes were proposed, with the final Docklands Light Railway plans mostly reusing old railway routes, including the former NLR branch to Poplar. The Stratford–Poplar service was the second line to receive legislative consent in April 1985, one year after the first Tower Gateway–Island Gardens route. In the Bow area stations were planned on the old NLR alignment at Bow Church and Devons Road.

The DLR station opened on 31 August 1987 as one of the original stations of the service. A further station was planned to the south at Langdon Park, but was not built due to lack of funding. The infill station was eventually built and opened on 9 December 2007.

== Design ==
The station consists of two side platforms on a north–south alignment. It has retained much of the architectural design from its construction. It was built by Balfour Beatty with distinctive half-cylindrical glazed blue canopies. It is one of the few DLR stations to have its original features preserved. Two lifts provide step-free access from the platforms to the street. Platforms were lengthened to take two car trains soon after opening. As part of the 2000s DLR Capacity Enhancement Project the platforms were extended to the south to enable three car trains, the original staircases were replaced and the canopies extended.

== Location ==
The station is located on Devons Road in the London Borough of Tower Hamlets. The area 0.5 kilometres (0.31 mi) around the station is primarily residential, with approximately 18,700 residents within 6,400 households. London Buses routes 108 and 323 serve the station.

== Services ==
The typical off-peak service in trains per hour from Devons Road is:

- 12 tph to Stratford
- 12 tph to Canary Wharf

Additional services call at the station during the peak hours, increasing the service to up to 16 tph in each direction, with up to 8 tph during the peak hours extended beyond Canary Wharf to and from Lewisham.

== Notes ==
Preceding station	DLR	Following station
Langdon Park towards Lewisham	Docklands Light Railway	Bow Church towards Stratford
