= Art and Sacred Places =

Charity in London, United Kingdom, commissioning art for religious spaces

Art and Sacred Places is a UK-based national charity in London working in the field of commissioning visual art for sacred places. Its work includes both temporary and permanent commissions and projects which bring together communities of people from both faith and non-faith backgrounds.

== Mission statement ==
Art and Sacred Places – Creative Conversations

– Commissions exciting and innovative work from contemporary artists for sacred places. – Stimulates creative dialogue through encounters with art and the sacred. – Widens vision through education and participation.

== History ==
Art and Sacred Places was founded under the auspices of the Rt Revd John Gladwin at that time the Anglican Bishop of Guildford. The organisation, then known as Art 2000, formed in 1998 and became a Charitable Unincorporated Association in May 2001 under the name Art and Sacred Places. In June 2014 it became a Charitable Incorporated Organisation.

The Very Revd Stephen Waine, Dean of Chichester, became President in 2015. The organisation's patrons include the broadcaster Andrew Graham-Dixon.

== Development and projects ==
Since its formation Art and Sacred Places has had several notable programmes of work.

The first programme was the 1999 'Seeing the Light' exhibition organised, using existing work, in Portsmouth Cathedral, Guildford Cathedral and Chichester Cathedral. The Chichester exhibition included Jerwood Sculpture Prize 2004 short-listed artist Simon Hitchens.

In 2000 'Projects in Sacred Places' was organised with specially commissioned work. For this initiative, which took place across four Cathedrals and a Brighton Church, of particular note was the Richard Wentworth work 'Recall' for Winchester Cathedral. A catalogue was produced with essays by Sacha Craddock and Father Friedhelm Mennekes.

For the 2003/4 series Turner Prize 2007 nominee Nathan Coley exhibited 'Black Tent' in Portsmouth Cathedral; Lithuanian Venice Biennale 2001 artist Deimantas Narkevicius exhibited 'The Role of a Lifetime' in St Peter's Church, Brighton and Rose Finn-Kelcey created 'Angel' for St Paul's Church in Bow Common in the East End of London. Sarah Wedderburn, writing in the Church Times reported the incumbent of St Paul's saying 'the work succeeds because it captures so many different aspects of the culture of this community.'

'The Role of a Lifetime' provoked international publicity in magazines such as 'Flash Art Italia' and 'Untitled' and a copy of the film was subsequently purchased by Tate Galleries. 'The Role of a Lifetime' has since been exhibited internationally and featured at the 2009 Istanbul Biennial.

Rose Finn-Kelcey's 'Angel' was a 2008 recipient of the ACE Award for 'Art in a Religious Context' It also featured as a best practice project in the Arts Council England Central London Partnership publication 'Open space'.

Catalogues were produced for 'Black Tent' and 'The Role of a Lifetime' but 'Angel' has a website publication.

In 2005 Art and Sacred Places embarked on 'Six Sacred Sites', its first interfaith project. This was a collaborative initiative working with 'aspex' gallery in Portsmouth and 'The Winchester Gallery' on the production and exhibition of site related artists' books. The project, which was designed to explore the range of ways in which a location may be regarded as sacred included communities and sites associated with Portsmouth Anglican Cathedral, Wessex Jamaat Mosque, Basingstoke Hindu Society, Newport Quaker Meeting, roadside shrines with RoadPeace and South Wonston's ancient long barrow.

'Six Sacred Sites' artists included Sam Winston, Jimmy Symonds and Ansuman Biswas. A copy of Census, the book produced by Glenn Boulter and Chris Maxted for the ancient long barrow, was purchased by Tate Galleries for their library. During one of the many exhibitions of the 'Six Sacred Sites' work the University of the West of England Bookarts co-organised with Winchester School of Art library an artist's book conference held at The Winchester Gallery.

In 2009 Art and Sacred Places was retained by Bristol City Council Art and the Public Realm as the consultant curator for two permanent commissions for Roman Catholic Secondary Schools. The artists selected for the commissions were Elpida Hadzi-Vasileva and Michael Pinsky.

Heather and Ivan Morison were commissioned by Art and Sacred Places to work in Manchester as a result of a 'Faiths in Action' award, also in 2009. Their interfaith work with Manchester Cathedral and Manchester Islamic Centre and Didsbury Mosque was continued by Nicola Dale. Dale's delicate entrance-exit ways, entitled 'Between' and exploring the notion of passage, became a physical link between the two places of worship. A catalogue was produced with articles by members of the communities and Dr Jacques Rangasamy MBE, a conversation between the artist and curator and poetry. Dale reminisces about this commission in.

Art and Sacred Places has also curated and supported the work of 10 days in Winchester during three of its iterations. 'Companion of Space' was performed by emerging artists forma in response to the rhythm and symbolism of the ceremonies of Winchester Cathedral in 2011. 47 artists from all disciplines working on 30 projects carried out work for 'Creative Collisions' again in Winchester Cathedral in 2013. Included among the artists were Professor Alice Kettle and Stephen Cooper with their work 'The Offering'. In 2015 CHALK was the foundation, material and inspiration for work which ranged from the openly exquisite to the deeply reflective with 20 projects across both Winchester Cathedral and Winchester City Museum.
