= Bow Road railway station =

Disused railway station in England

Bow Road
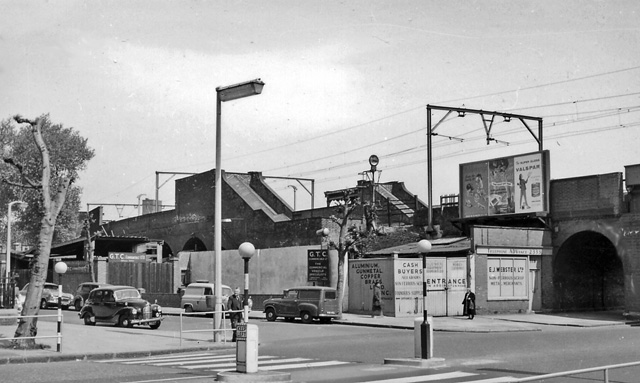
- Station building remains in 1961

General information
- Location: Bow, Tower Hamlets
- Coordinates: 51.52833°N 0.02211°W
- Platforms: 2

Other information
- Status: Disused

History
- Opened: 1 October 1876
- Closed: 7 November 1949
- Pre-grouping: Great Eastern Railway
- Post-grouping: London and North Eastern Railway

Key dates
- 4 April 1892: Re-sited
- 21 April 1941: Closed
- 9 December 1946: Re-opened
Location
- Location in Tower Hamlets

Bow Road is a closed railway station in Bow, East London, that was opened in 1876 on the Bow Curve branch line by the Great Eastern Railway (GER).

The station building was situated slightly west of a former North London Railway (NLR) station called Bow and near the current Bow Road Underground station and Bow Church DLR station. Bow Road station was re-sited in 1892 to a site 3 miles 7 chains (5 km) down-line from Fenchurch Street. It was closed in 1949.

== History ==
=== Bow and Bromley station ===
The line that the station was located on, called the Bow Curve, was opened by the London and Blackwall Extension Railway (LBER) on 2 April 1849. This line served the first station on the site, named Bow and Bromley and located south of Bow Road itself, on a viaduct. Trains would, if there was a connecting service, run on to an interchange station called Victoria Park and Bow, otherwise services terminated at Bow and Bromley. The Eastern Counties Railway (ECR) was not particularly co-operative in stopping many of their services at Victoria Park and Bow, and in the March 1850 Bradshaw's Guide the only ECR services to call at Victoria Park and Bow were the 6:07 a.m. to Norwich on weekdays and the 1:37 p.m. to Norwich on Sundays. In the London-bound direction there were no weekday services at all, and just two services called on Sundays at 1:05 and 9:28 p.m.

The original intention had been to build a junction with the ECR main line between Bishopsgate and Stratford stations and run through-trains from Fenchurch Street. (Note: At this date the only other intermediate station between Bishopsgate and Stratford was Mile End.)

The relationship between the two railway companies was poor at this time so the junction was not built and services on the newly opened branch lasted until 26 September 1850 when the original station was closed. The relationship gradually improved and in 1854 the junction between the two lines was built and the LBER became part of the initial London Tilbury and Southend Railway (LTSR) route to Fenchurch Street (with the more direct route from Barking opening in 1858). (Note: The LBER and ECR were partners in the LTSR)

By the 1860s the railways in East Anglia were in financial trouble, and most were leased to the ECR; they wished to amalgamate formally, but could not obtain government agreement for this until 1862, when the Great Eastern Railway (GER) was formed by amalgamation.

=== First Bow Road station ===
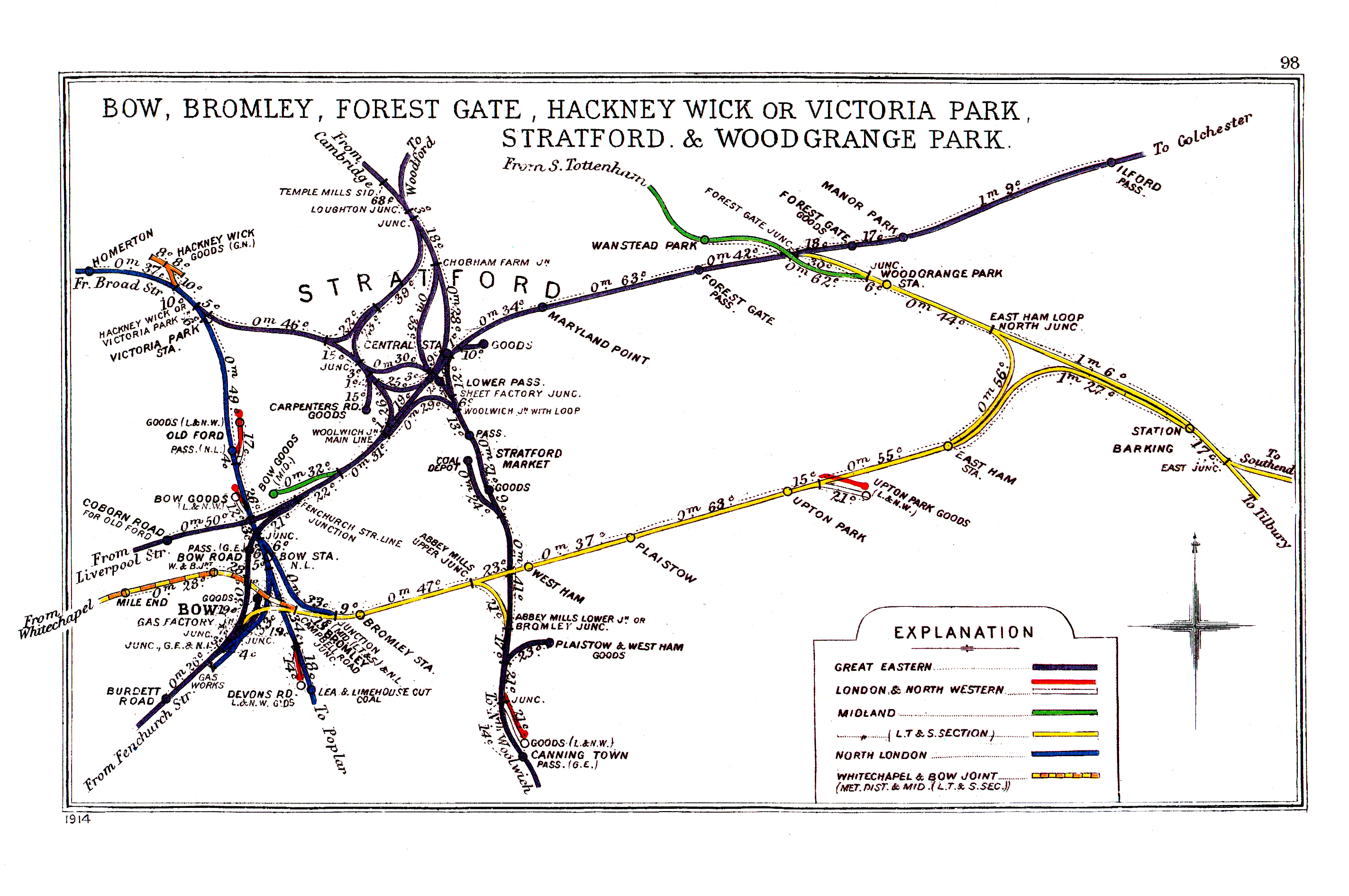
A 1914 Railway Clearing House junction diagram showing railways in the vicinity of Bow Road (lower left, labelled pass. (g.e.))

The London and Blackwall Railway (LBR) was leased four years later in 1866 and some 10 years later on 1 October 1876 the GER built a new station south of Bow Road, which was named Bow Road and stood on the original site of Bromley and Bow station, but the new station had wooden platforms that had to be cantilevered off the viaduct. There was a small booking office at street-level with stairs leading up to the platform each side of the viaduct.

On 3 September 1881 there was a collision at Bow Road when a train ran into the back of a stationary train which had failed at the station. The driver and fireman of the moving train were killed and 11 passengers were injured. In the inquiry that followed the cause was deemed to be the failure of the signalman to protect the rear of the train by setting signals to "danger". The train crew were criticised in that while they had noticed the signals were not at "danger", they had failed to inform the signalman. The guard of the first train was also criticised for not having properly protected the rear of the failed train.

In the late 1880s a small goods yard was opened south of Bow Road passenger station. (Note: The Eyre & Spottiswoode map of Poplar in 1885 does not show the yard.) It handled domestic coal, bricks, building materials and general merchandise and was equipped (in GER days) with a five-ton capacity crane, seven-ton cart weighbridge and a small goods lock-up. The yard was closed in 1964 and the Bow Triangle Business Centre now occupies the site.

In 1892 Bow Road passenger station was re-sited to the north and an interchange walkway provided with the neighbouring NLR's Bow station. After closure, the first station building was used as a coal office, later an auctioneer, then in 1912 was converted to a cinema.

=== Second Bow Road station ===
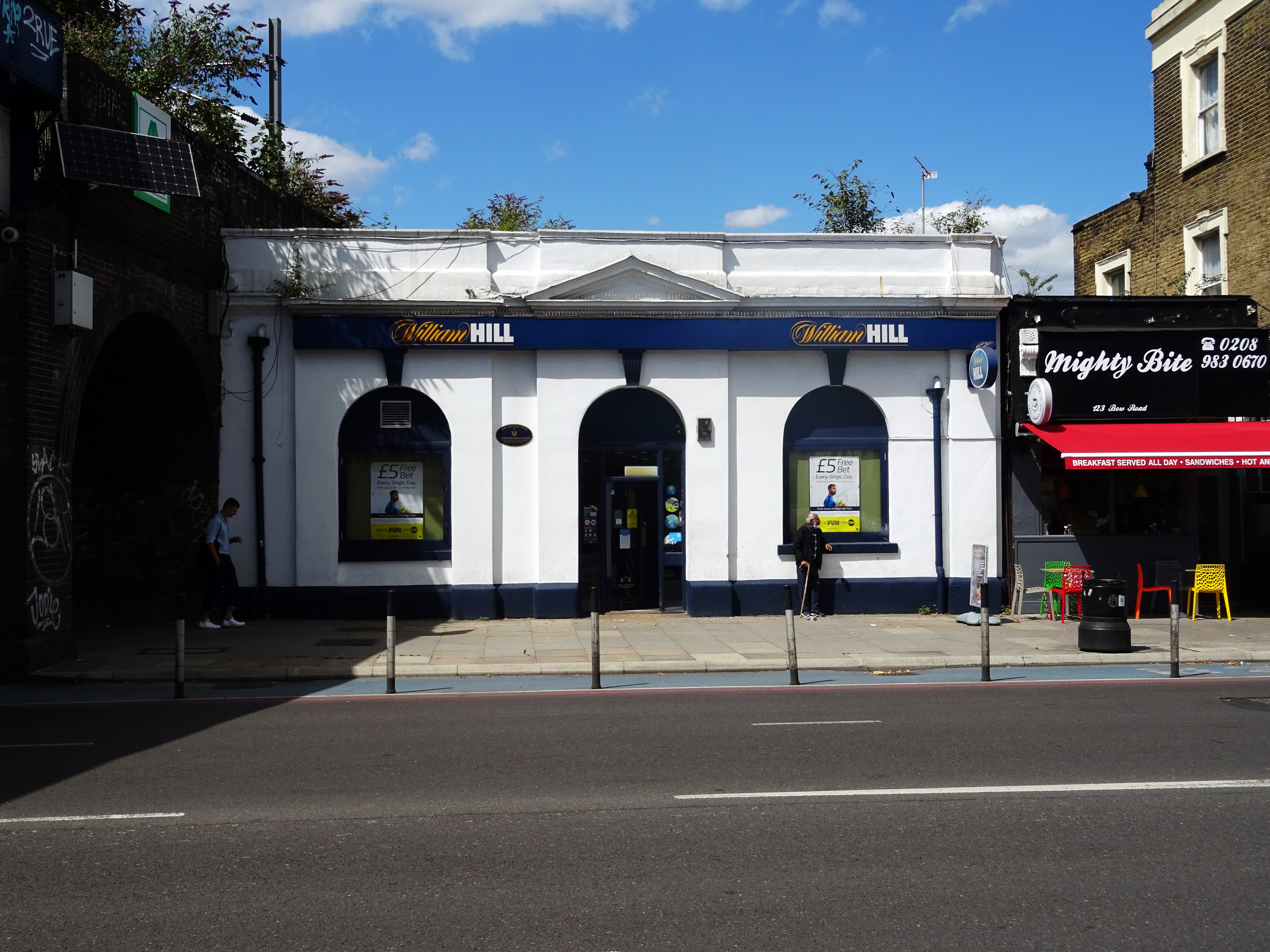
The disused station building, now a bookmakers, in 2020.

The re-sited Bow Road station commenced operations on 4 April 1892. The re-locating of this station then allowed the GER to withdraw a Bow to Fenchurch Street service it was running from the adjoining NLR's Bow station (which they had taken over from the NLR in 1869). (Note: The NLR commenced operations into its own terminus at Broad Street in 1865 so no longer needed access to Fenchurch Street as well.) Essentially the GER had been operating two services from Bow to Fenchurch Street since 1876 which given the increasingly busy nature of the London, Tilbury and Southend Railway (as well as freight) was almost certainly a move to relieve congestion as well as save costs.

The walkway between Bow Road and Bow stations was closed in 1917 as a wartime economy measure, a mere 25 years after Bow Road had been re-sited.

In the July 1922 edition of Bradshaw's Guide, trains serving Bow Road could be found on page 318. On weekdays the first country-bound train from Fenchurch Street ran at 6:20 a.m. with the last at 9:53 p.m. The journey time was around 12 minutes (assuming trains stopped at all intermediate stations, although some did not). Journey time to Stratford was then a further six minutes. Most trains went as far as Ilford. In the opposite direction the first train to Fenchurch Street departed Bow Road at 5:49 a.m. and the last at 9:30 p.m.

The new station was taken over by the London and North Eastern Railway (LNER) after the 1923 grouping. On 21 April 1941 the station was closed due to bomb damage as a result of German bombing raids during the Blitz.

Bow Road re-opened on 9 December 1946 but then closed between 6 January 1947 and 6 October 1947 so a number of alterations could be made. The line was electrified at this point and the original intention was to run shuttle services between Stratford and Fenchurch Street.

Following nationalisation of the railways in 1948, Bow Road became part of the Eastern Region of British Railways. It was then decided to withdraw passenger services from the line and Bow Road station was permanently closed on 7 November 1949. The line was retained for diversions.

== Notes ==
Preceding station	Disused railways	Following station
Burdett Road	Great Eastern Railway; Bow Curve	Stratford
Burdett Road	Great Eastern Railway; London and Blackwall Extension Railway	Victoria Park and Bow
