= Devons Road =

Road in east London

Coordinates: 51°31′12″N 0°1′13″W

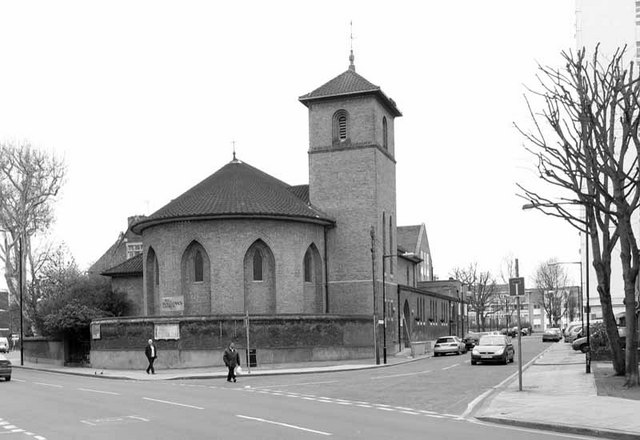
- Church of All Hallows, Bow at the junction of Devons Road and Blackthorn Street
- Length: 0.7 mi (1.1 km)
- Location: Tower Hamlets, London
- Postal code: E3
- Nearest train station: Devons Road

Devons Road is a road in Bromley-by-Bow in east London. Part of the B140 road, it gives its name to the Devons Road DLR station.

== Motive power depots ==
The North London Railway established a large motive power depot at Bow around 1850, which was demolished in 1882 and incorporated into Bow railway works. Two larger locomotive depots were then built at Devons Road nearby.

Devons Road No.1 shed

The No.1 shed was badly damaged by bombing during the Second World War. It was rebuilt in 1946 by the London Midland and Scottish Railway, and then converted into the first UK diesel maintenance depot by British Railways in 1958. It was closed in 1964 and demolished.

Devons Road No.2 shed

The No.2 shed was closed by the London Midland and Scottish Railway in 1935 and demolished.

== Stroudley Walk ==
The closure of Devons Road Number 1 shed by British Railways in the 1960s freed up the land for development as social housing. This led to a new street layout with streets and buildings named in honour of Britain's railway heritage. As a result, the north end of Devons Road, adjoining Bow Road, was changed into a pedestrian area and renamed Stroudley Walk in honour of the great locomotive engineer William Stroudley. In 2006 the Council transferred ownership of the housing, shops and pedestrian area to Poplar HARCA.

== St Andrew's Hospital ==
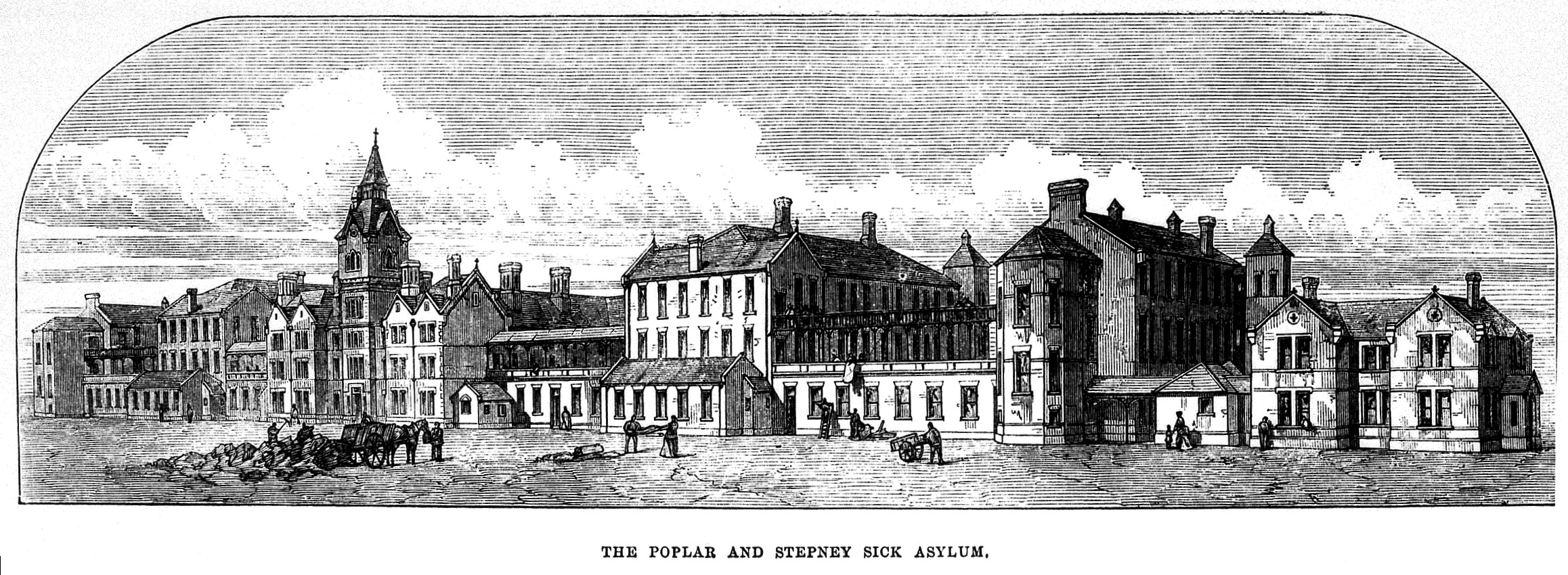
The Poplar and Stepney Sick Asylum in 1871

The Poplar and Stepney Sick Asylum was established in Devons Road in 1868. This institution was renamed St Andrew's Hospital in 1921, after a nearby church that was destroyed in the First World War. It housed a School of Nursing from 1875 to 1991. All its functions were eventually transferred to NHS facilities in Newham, and it was demolished in 2008. In 2010 the site was redeveloped as housing including a smaller health centre.

== The Widow's Son ==
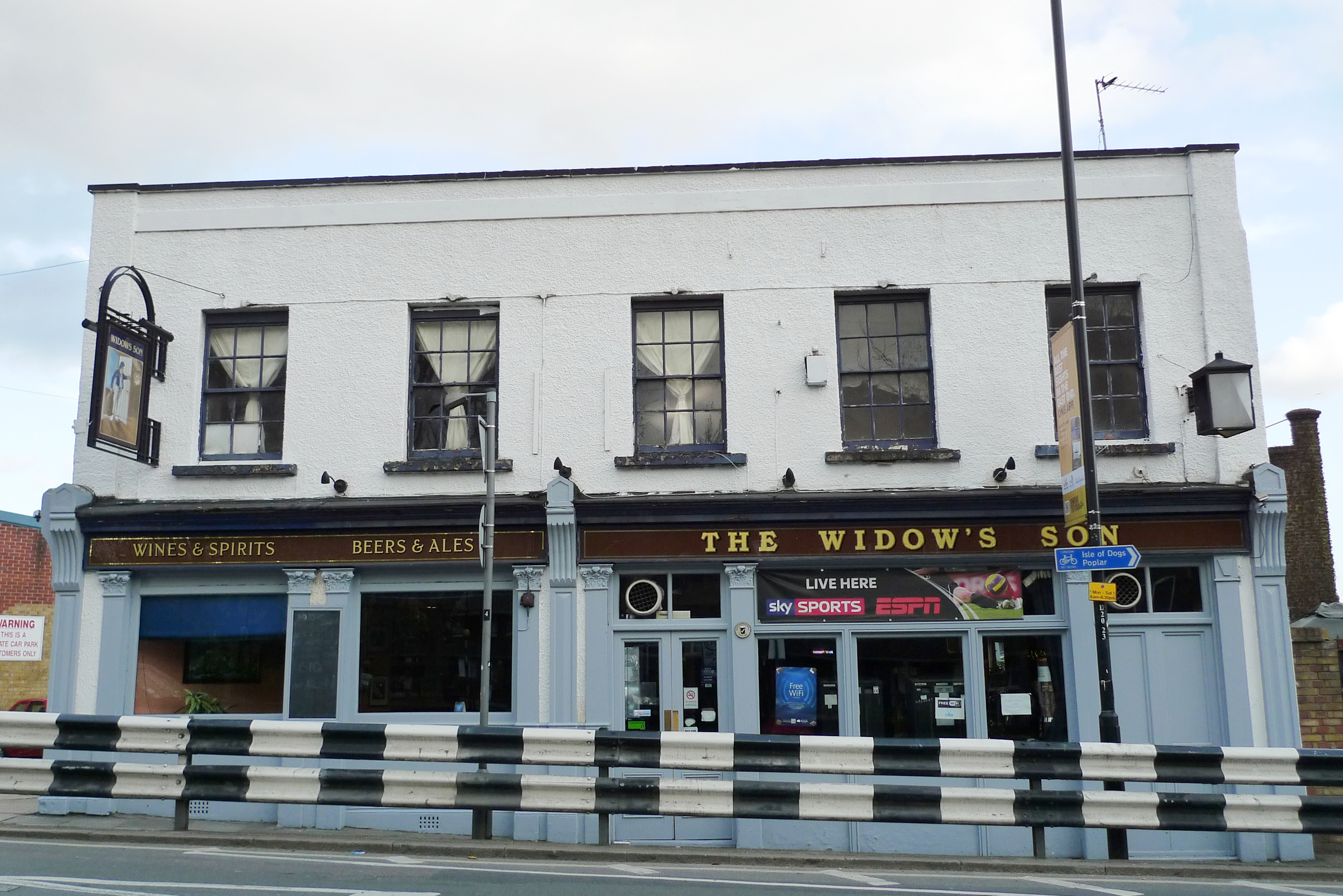
The Widow's Son, London

The Widow's Son is a Grade II* listed public house at 75 Devons Road. It was built in 1848 and is famous for its annual Good Friday hotcross bun ritual.
