= Victoria Park and Bow railway station =

Former railway station in England

Victoria Park and Bow
- Interactive map of Victoria Park and Bow

General information
- Location: Bow
- Grid reference: TQ373831
- Owner: Eastern Counties Railway
- Number of platforms: 2

Key dates
- 1849: Opened
- 1851: Closed

Other information
- Coordinates: 51.53016°N 0.02204°W

Victoria Park and Bow was a short-lived railway station in Bow, east London.

== History ==
Built by the Eastern Counties Railway (ECR), it opened on 2 April 1849, seemingly for the main purpose of providing an interchange between the London and Blackwall Extension Railway's (LBER) Fenchurch Street branch and the ECR's main line between Bishopsgate and Stratford.

The LBER had hoped to run through to Stratford but its relationship with the ECR was poor and a junction allowing connection from the LBER's line to the ECR's was not constructed.

It appears Victoria Park and Bow station was little-used, as the ECR stopped few trains there. Study of Bradshaw's Railway Guide for March 1850 reveals the only ECR services out of the Bishopsgate terminus which called at the station were the 6:07 a.m. to Norwich on weekdays and the 1:37 p.m. to Norwich on Sundays. In the London-bound direction there were no weekday services whilst just two services called on Sunday at 1:05 p.m. and 9:28 p.m. As a result, LBER services mostly terminated at Bow and Bromley. The Fenchurch Street services on the LBER branch lasted until 26 September 1850. Limited services on the ECR's main line continued to call until 6 January 1851.

By 1854 relations between the two companies had improved and the junction connecting the two lines was built and the LBER became part of the initial London, Tilbury and Southend Railway (LTSR) route to Fenchurch Street (with the more direct route from Barking opening in 1858). (Note: The LBER and ECR were partners in the LTSR)

== Location ==
It was located close to the present-day Bow Junction on what is now the Great Eastern Main Line between Stratford and Bethnal Green.

The nearest station to the site of the former Victoria Park and Bow station today is Bow Church, on the Docklands Light railway, a train from there towards Stratford passes the site of the former station as the DLR line joins the Great Eastern Main Line.

== Notes ==
Preceding station	Disused railways	Following station
Mile End	Eastern Counties Railway	Stratford
