= Bow Church =

Coordinates: 51.5287°N 0.0169°W

- St Mary's Church, Bow
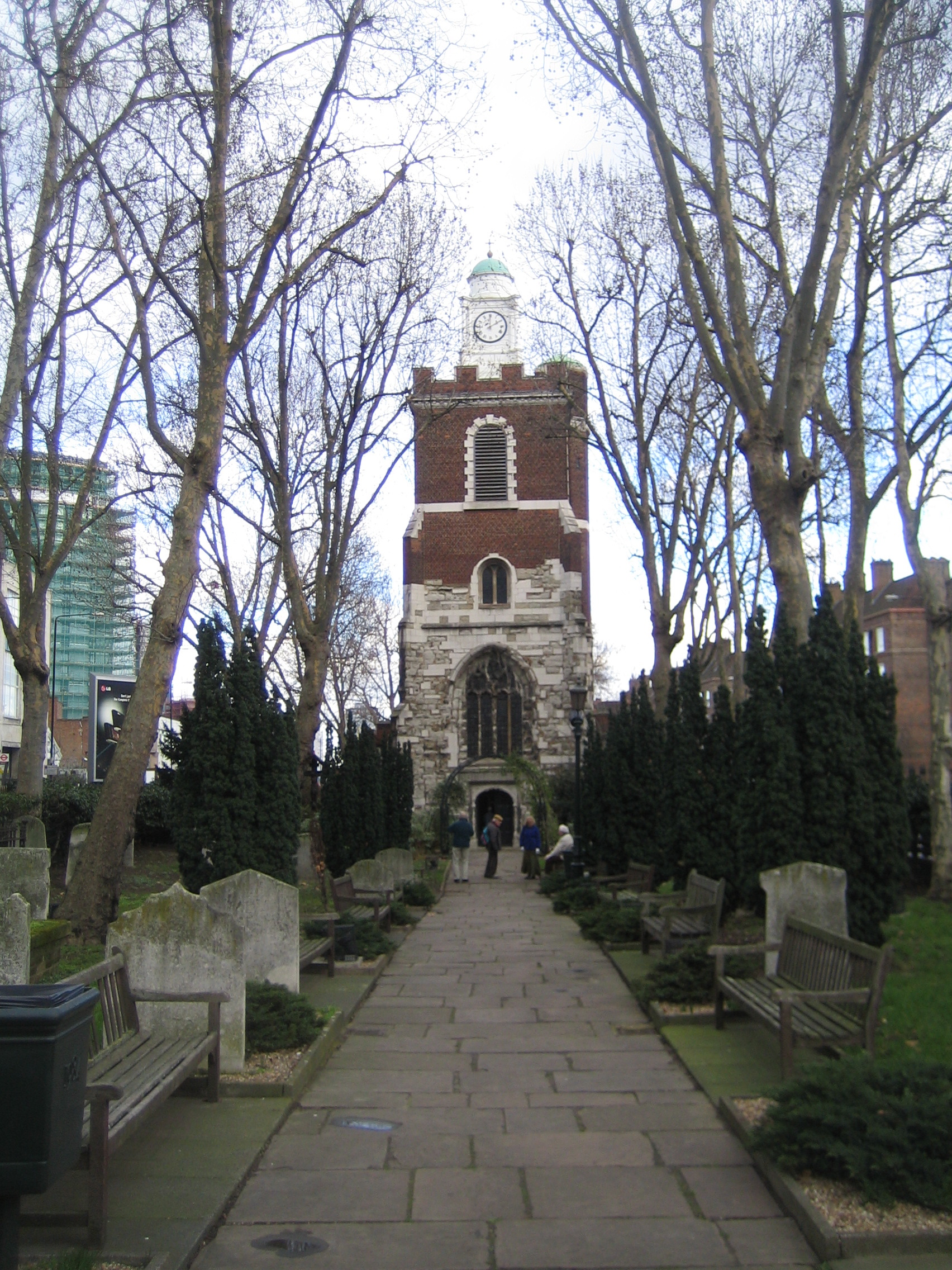
- Bow Church in 2008
- Bow Church
- Country: England
- Denomination: Church of England
- Website: www.bow.church

History
- Founded: 17 November 1311

Administration
- Division: Tower Hamlets
- Diocese: London
- Parish: Parish of St Mary and Holy Trinity, Stratford, Bow

Clergy
- Rector: Andy Clasper

Bow Church is the parish church of St Mary and Holy Trinity, Stratford, Bow. It is located on a central reservation site in Bow Road (part of the A11), in Bow, in the London Borough of Tower Hamlets. There has been a church on the same site for approximately 700 years. The church was bombed in the Second World War, and the bell tower was reconstructed just after the war.

== History ==
The church (as a chapel of ease) was licensed by bishop Ralph Baldock of London on 17 November 1311 for the people of Stratford-at-Bow within the parish of Stepney. Before this, local people were obliged to travel to St Dunstan's, Stepney, to attend church. This was a difficult journey - especially in winter - when the road was cut off by flooding. In the 14th century, they felt confident and wealthy enough to petition for their own place of worship. The chapel of ease allowed them to practise their religion locally, but they were still obliged to attend St Dunstan's at Stepney on religious holidays and to pay for its upkeep. In 1497, following a dispute about the terms of this arrangement, an agreement was then reached, whereby the people of Bow promised to acknowledge themselves as parishioners of Stepney and agreed to pay 24 shillings annually for repairs of the mother church, and to dispense with their attendance there, except on the feast of Saint Dunstan, and on the Wednesday in Whitsunweek, when they were to accompany the rest of the parishioners in procession to Saint Paul's Cathedral.

In 1556 at Bow, during the reign of Mary I of England, and under the authority of Edmund Bonner, Bishop of London, many people were brought by cart from Newgate and burned at the stake in front of Bow Church in one of the many swings of the English Reformation. These included the thirteen Stratford Martyrs.

In 1719, the parish became independent and St Mary, Stratford, Bow, was consecrated. The parish also included the Old Ford area which has also been known as North Bow.

In 1767, the church became the resting place of colonel Philip Ludwell III, the earliest known convert to Eastern Orthodoxy in America. Although the church was Anglican, he was buried according to the funeral rites of the Orthodox Church. The last burial in the churchyard was in 1854, and it was re-ordered as a public garden by the Metropolitan Public Gardens Association in 1894, laid out by the MPGA's landscape gardener Fanny Wilkinson, who took advice from CR Ashbee of the Society for the Protection of Ancient Buildings as to which tombstones should be preserved. The eastern section of the churchyard was laid out as a garden by Wilkinson's successor Madeline Agar in 1911. More recent input by the MPGA has been the provision of 1,500 spring bulbs.

The present building is thought to have a 14th-century structure, the tower was added in the 15th century. It is constructed of Kentish Ragstone with brick additions. Many of the windows are in the late perpendicular style. Inside the church, there are monuments including those to Grace Amcottes, died 1551; Alice Coborn, died 1689; and Prisca Coborn, died 1701. The south aisle was replaced in 1794. In 1896, the chancel roof collapsed, prompting a major restoration by the architect Osborn C Hills. The church suffered considerable bomb damage during the London Blitz. The site was visited by Queen Elizabeth in 1951 to mark the start of a campaign to restore the church, the work was overseen by the architect H S Goodhart-Rendel. The Gothic-style iron railings around the churchyard were reinstated in 1984. The church was given Grade B listed building designation on 19 July 1950. and is now Grade II*.

It gives its name to the nearby Bow Church DLR station. Just outside the churchyard is a statue by Albert Bruce Joy of the Liberal Prime Minister, William Ewart Gladstone, which was paid for by the wealthy match manufacturer, Theodore H Bryant of Bryant and May in 1882.

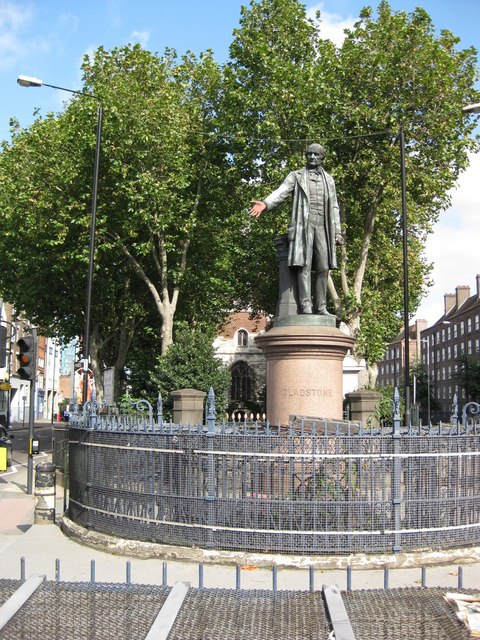
The Gladstone statue at Bow Church

The church is also used as the central image in the crest for the Bow masonic lodge, founded by the Rev Francis Mettrick, the then Rector of the church, in 1961.

The church is active today.

During 2011, the church celebrated 700 years of Christian life on the site.

== Rectors ==
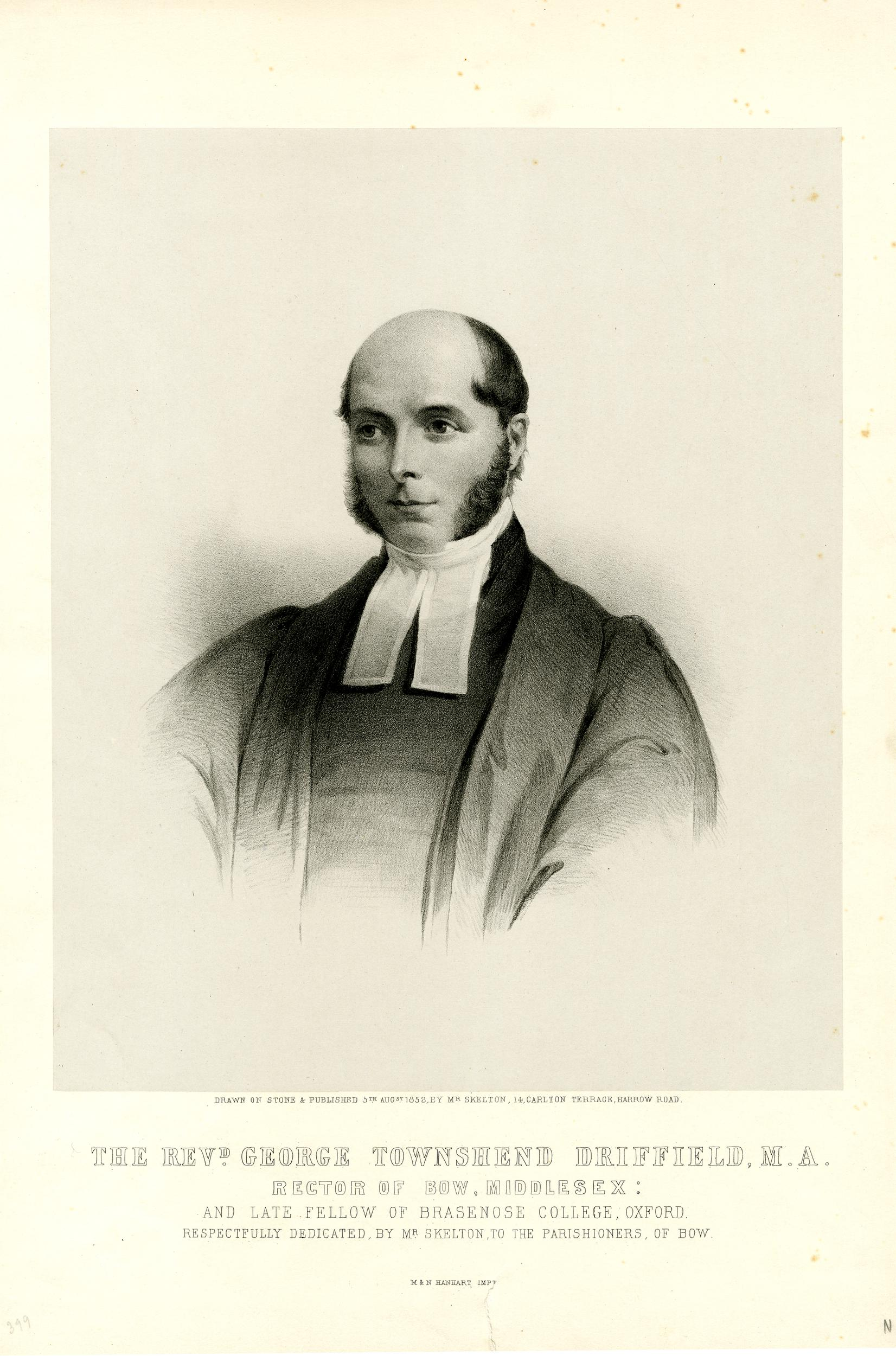
George Townshend Driffield, Rector 1844–1880

Bow became an independent parish in 1719. From the mid-18th to the mid-19th century, the parish was a college living of Brasenose College, Oxford, with all rectors from Parker to Driffield being from Brasenose College.

- 1719–1740† Robert Warren
- 1740 James Parker
- 1740–1770† Thomas Foxley
- 1771–1801† Allan Harrison Eccles
- 1802–1807† Samuel Henshall
- 1808–1809 Frodsham Hodson (later Principal of Brasenose College, Oxford)
- 1809–1843† Hamlett Harrison
- 1844–1880 George Townshend Driffield
- 1880–1892 William Pimblett Insley
- 1892–1898 Marmaduke Hare (later Dean of Trinity Cathedral, Davenport, Iowa, USA)
- 1899 Manley Power
- 1932–1951† George Ansell
- fl. 1961 Francis Mettrick
- 1989–2011† Michael Peet
- 2012–2018 Debbie Frazer
- 2019–2024 Timothy G. May
- 2025– Andy Clasper

† Rector died in post
