= Spratt's =

UK business

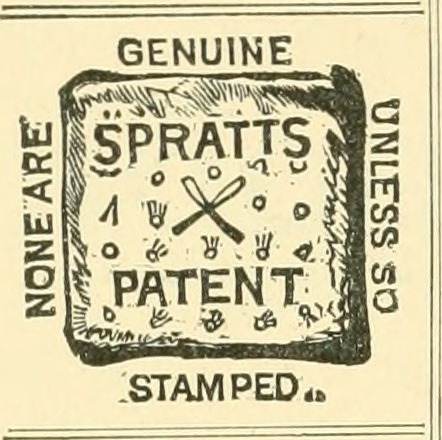
- Type: Private
- Industry: Pet food
- Founded: c.1860; 166 years ago in London, England
- Founder: James Spratt
- Headquarters: London, England

Spratt's was the world's first large-scale manufacturer of dog biscuits. The company successfully promoted their array of products for dogs and other domestic animals through the astute use of snob appeal. The company was the first to erect a billboard in London. Varieties of biscuits included 'Dog Cakes' (meat fibre and fish and meat), puppy biscuits in regular and with cod liver oil, 'Malt-milk' for puppies, 'Weetmeet' (which came in two versions one for large dogs and one for small dogs and puppies), 'Bonio', 'Spix', 'Ovals' in regular and mixed varieties (flavours being yeast & meat, fish, spice & cod liver oil, fibrine, and charcoal), 'Fibo' granulated kibble food, 'Rodnim' hound meal, Alsax, Speedall, as well as a tinned food variety.

== History ==
Spratt's Patent built their first oven in 1870 at the old London Armoury Company factory in Henry Street. Shortly afterwards, Stephen Wingrove (1854–1923) joined the business, Wingrove was acknowledged to be the driving force of the firm. He worked in it for over 50 years. When he joined there were 20 workers, three travelling salesmen (including Wingrove) and three clerks. Also in 1870, Spratt introduced his dog cakes to the United States. It was in 1881 that he obtained a U.S. patent. For 20 years he represented the firm both on the road and in the market, becoming the General Manager c. 1890. By 1896, Spratt's had between 500 and 600 workmen, and scores of travellers and clerks. At the time of Wingrove's death at home in Banstead, Surrey, he was chairman and managing director of the company. He was also chairman of Messrs. Braschkaner and Co Ltd., the London Corn Exchange and several other companies. He was 67 years old, and was survived by a widow, two sons, and a daughter.

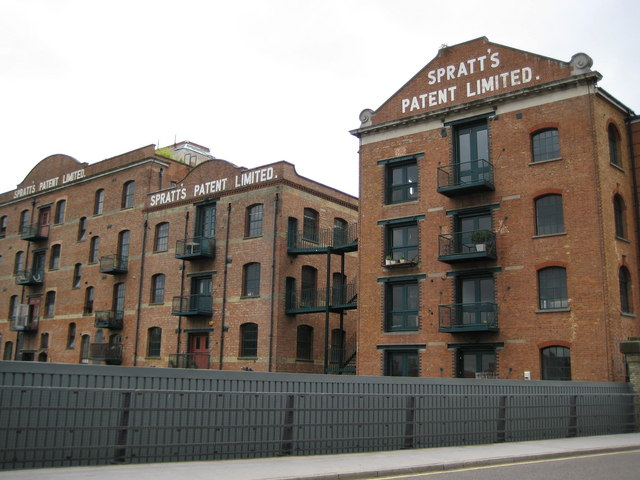
Limehouse Cut and Colmans Wharf, part of former Spratt's pet food factory

Wingrove oversaw the development of Spratt's Poplar factory. By 1896, it was an impressive affair: "Moreover, by ingenuity and mechanical skill they have built a plant at Poplar which combines all the elements of economies. That is to say, they have conceived a scheme of things which enables them to produce a variety of articles with precisely the same machinery, and, therefore, at a minimum of cost. The total indicated horsepower of the 11 steam engines, employed is 650. In addition to this, there are eight huge engines, having a total indicated horsepower of 100. In one way the factories at Poplar are a paradox."

In 1960, the company was acquired by Spillers, which in turn sold its pet food divisions to Nestlé in 1998.

The former factory in Poplar is a well-preserved site with about 150 live-work units called the Spratt's Complex. Much of the original markings are visible on the buildings, with names painted on the DLR track-side walls, and on the small chimney visible from Morris Road. Many well known artists and creatives have lived in the building over the years, including John Copnall, Michael Green, Newton Faulkner, Debbie Bragg, Ian Berry, and Roger Law of Spitting Image fame.
