= Chrisp Street Market Clock Tower =

Clock tower in London

Coordinates: 51°30′45″N 0°00′50″W

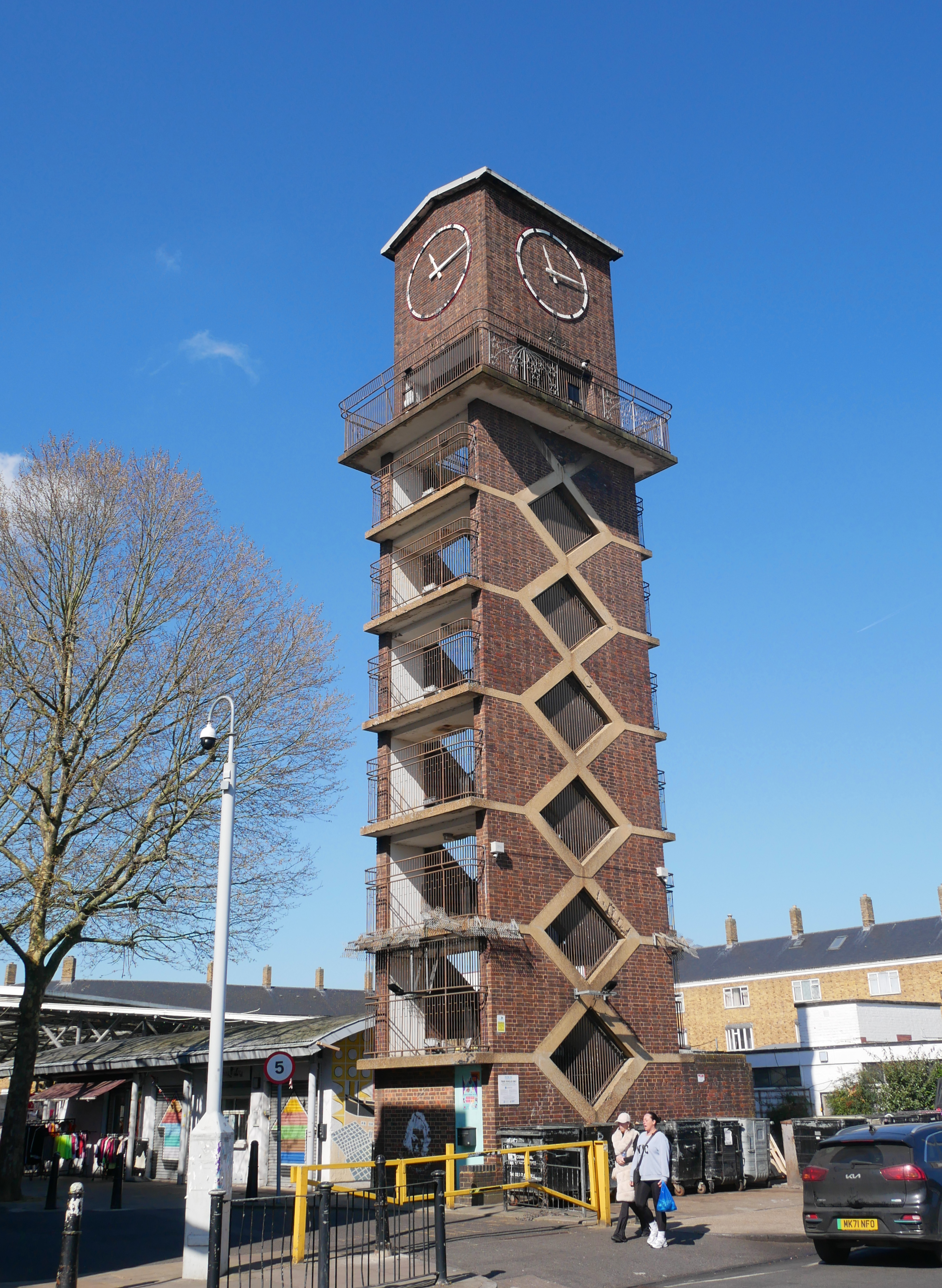
- Interactive map of the Chrisp Street Market Clock Tower area

General information
- Location: Poplar, London
- Completed: 1952

Chrisp Street Market Clock Tower is a Grade II listed landmark located in Market Square, Chrisp Street, Poplar. It was designed by the architect Frederick Gibberd as part of the Lansbury Estate for the Festival of Britain, 1951. The clock tower is an example of early post-war architecture, and an aesthetic that became known as the "Festival Style".

== History ==
The clock tower was designed in 1949 by Frederick Gibberd as part of his plans for Chrisp Street Market, a pedestrianised shopping area that would form the commercial centre of the new Lansbury Estate. The estate was a landmark project in post-war urban renewal, and formed part of the Live Architecture Exhibition at the Festival of Britain, 1951.

However budgetary cuts and time constraints in the run-up to the festival meant that construction on the Lansbury Estate was behind schedule, and the clock tower was built in 1952.
