= John Gilbertson =

John Francis Gilbertson (1882–1947) was an English politician who served as mayor of Poplar, 1938–9. He represented Cubitt Town as a Labour Councillor from 1933.

Gilbertson was born in 1882 in the Elizabeth Cottages, off Westferry Road. In 1901 the family moved to nearby Crew Street. After his marriage to Margarte Stamp they lived at 46 Havannah Street, still in the same neighbourhood.

He was Treasurer of the local Labour Party.

Gilbertson House, built in 1950 in Mellish Street is named after him.
