= Spratt's Complex =

Coordinates: 51°31′06″N 0°00′58″W

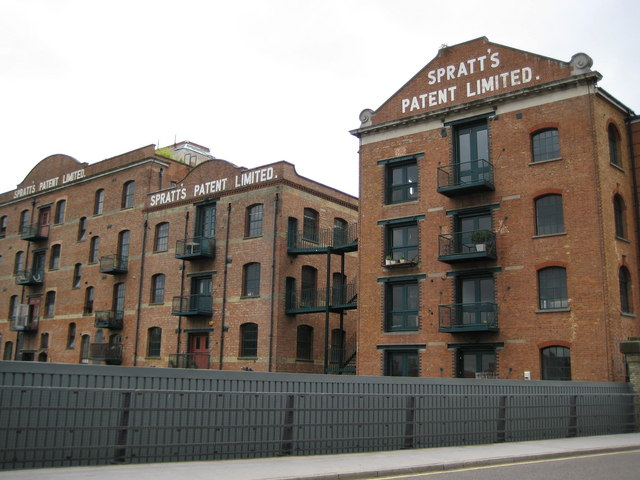
Limehouse Cut and Colmans Wharf, part of former Spratt's pet food factory

Spratt's Complex is a housing development in Poplar, London. The former pet food factory was converted into approximately 150 live-work units beginning in 1985. This was one of the first such warehouse conversions in London. The complex is on Morris Road, lining Limehouse Cut canal, and is situated between the DLR stations of Langdon Park and Devons Road.

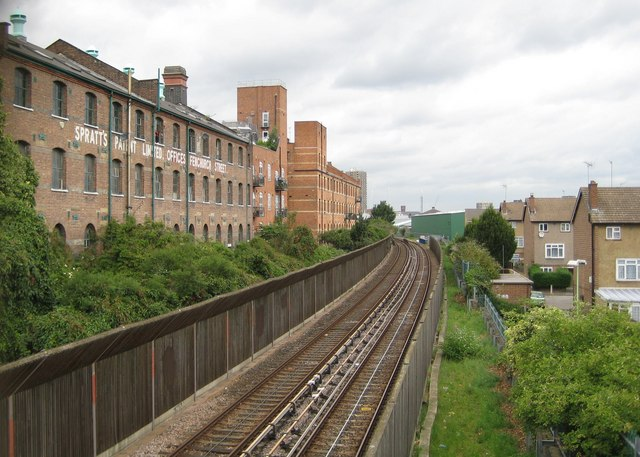
Original markings are visible from the DLR

The complex, originally Spratt's dog biscuit factory, consists of six multi-storey warehouses made of reinforced concrete grouped around courtyards. Much of the original factory markings and lettering are visible on the buildings and on the small chimney visible from Morris Road. The complex is also locally known as "Spratt's Works" or "Spratt's Factory".

== History ==
=== The Spratt's Works (1899-1969) ===
The factory was built prior to 1899, possibly as early as 1860 according to the deeds of some residents, though the architecture suggests construction took place some decades later.

The building now known as Colman's Wharf was originally a seed, packing, grain warehouse. Limehouse Cut was once a series of grain warehouses, along with buildings for baking, veterinary medicine and laboratory stores. Foundry House was once a power house, as well as a bakery. Patent House was originally a delivery and grain warehouse with space for biscuit packing, a blacksmiths, box makers and an advertising department. One Fawe Street was historically a grain warehouse, flour warehouse and bakery.

The location along Limehouse Cut allowed barges to easily deliver fish heads and other supplies to the factory for processing. The company was not restricted to dog biscuits: in the Second Boer War (1899–1902), four million ship's biscuits a week were made for the British Army. Before 1914, the factory made other food for human consumption under the "Poplar" brand.

After the imposition of purchase tax on pet food in 1969, the factory closed down.

=== The derelict years (1970-1985) ===
The warehouses were derelict for some years until they were redeveloped between 1985 and 1989. As local lore has it, dog fighting took place years ago in the basement. The Foundry House was derelict, with tape left on the windows from The Blitz and great globs of toffee on the floors left by Appleton's (wholesale confectioners who had occupied the building after Spratt's). Originally, the courtyard was cobbled throughout.

Colman's Wharf was occupied by Gina Plastics until sold for development in 1988, at which time there was a huge industrial bay outside Studio5, on what is now part of the car park. The space at the canal end of the floors of Colman's Wharf was much larger than now, as there was no interior staircase, nor was the present lift shaft part of the building, as large hoists were in use before its development. The ceilings had huge grid works of iron sprinkler pipes complete with large taps and fixings, and the doors that now open onto balconies and those overlooking the canal were of the stable door type, glazed in the upper part and solid in the lower part. The windows are original except for some of those in studios on the third floor facing the City.

=== The conversion project (1985-1989) ===
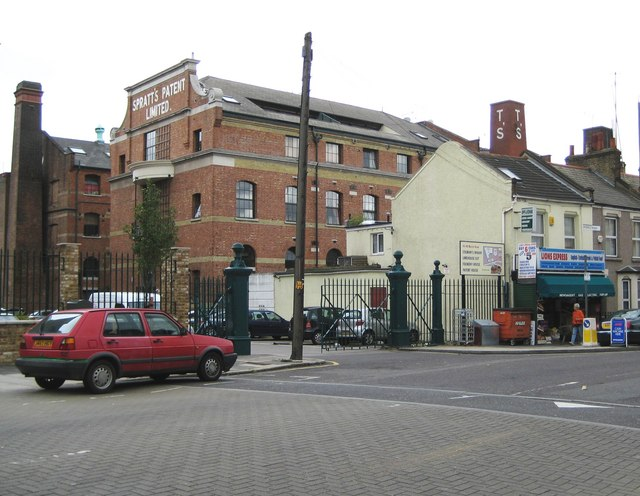
Patent House, from Morris Road

The complex was split into studio workshops (live/work units) and sold by JJAK (Construction) Ltd as empty shells for leaseholders to fit out. The first building to be converted was Limehouse Cut. The studio sizes vary between 580 to 1,610 sq ft (54 to 150 m^{2}). The building was featured in the Sunday Times in June 1986 and again in 1989. Back in 1986, the studio - "part workplace, part home" - had no status in planning law. At that time, residents of the building included the Queen's tapestry restorer Ksynia Marko, a packaging firm, Roger Law of Spitting Image, sculptor Michael Green and ceramicist Elizabeth Fritsch.

=== Today ===
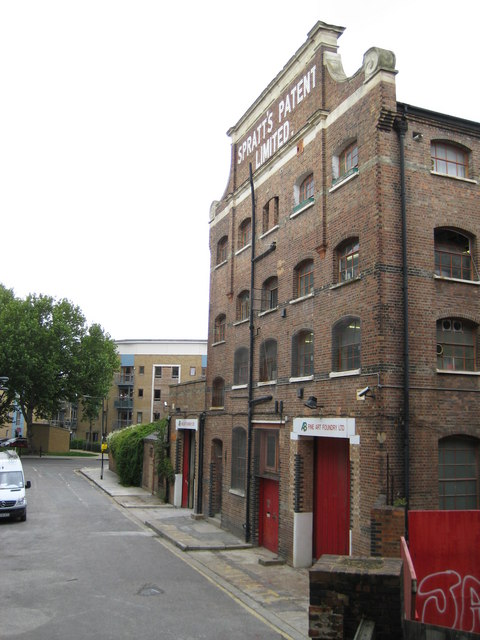
Patent House, from Fawe Street

The building is now a series of "live/work units" used by artists, designers, architects, and other creative professions.

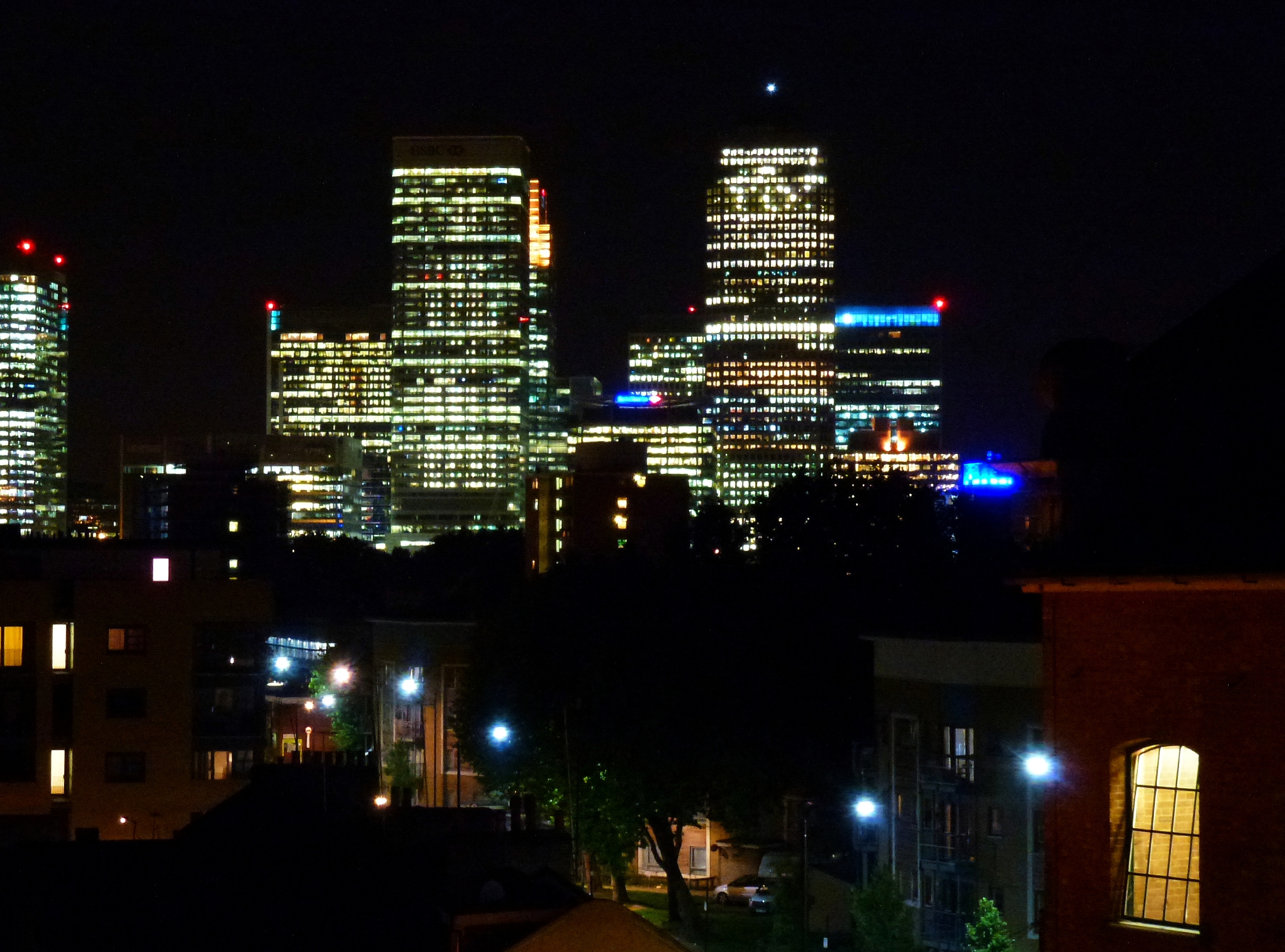
View from the roof garden

At the top of Limehouse Cut building is a large 1,500 sq ft (140 m^{2}) communal roof garden with views over Canary Wharf. (Note: See File:LimehouseCutRoofGarden.jpg) It is private and maintained by volunteering residents.

On 8 October 2008, the Langdon Park conservation area was extended to include the Spratt's Complex.
