= Meridian House, Poplar =

House in Poplar, London

Coordinates: 51°30′33″N 0°00′57″W

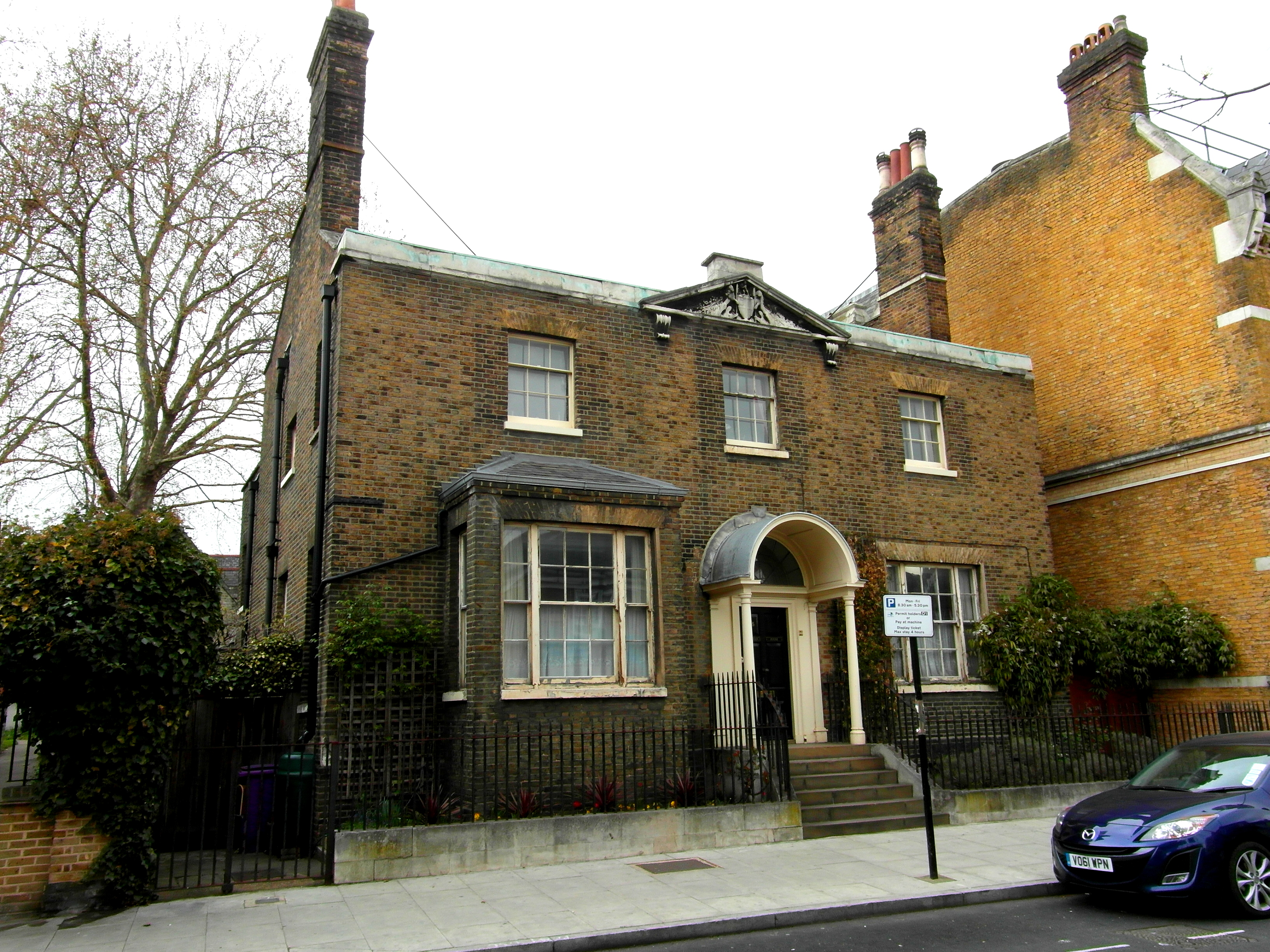
- Meridian House in 2012
- Interactive map of Meridian House, Poplar
- Full name: Meridian House
- Address: 115 Poplar High Street
- Location: London
- Owner: Private residence

Meridian House is located on No. 115 Poplar High Street, London. It was built in 1801–2 by the East India Company to house the chaplain serving the company's almshouses and chapel. The chapel later became the Church of St Matthias, and Meridian House its vicarage, in 1867. When the church closed in 1976, Meridian House was sold as a private residence. It is a Grade II listed building.

== History ==
Hugh Greete, a diamond trader for the East India Company, was sent home from India a prisoner in 1618 after allegedly buying diamonds for the company's use but keeping the finest ones for himself. After his death in 1619, the company seized Greete's diamonds and other goods to make up for the fraud. Since Greete's will specified that his estate should be used to make a school or a hospital, the company earmarked the money to build an almshouse for disabled seamen, their widows and orphans.

The almshouse opened in 1628, and it was maintained by a levy on the wages of East India Company employees, known as the Poplar Fund. This fund financed the building of Meridian House.

== Architecture ==
Meridian House was presumably designed by the East India Company's surveyor Henry Holland. It is made of stock brick and carries a pediment with the East India Company's arms. A long brick entrance porch was added in 1826, which was removed in 1964 for road widening and replaced by a hood and columns designed by Cecil Brown.
