= Old Town Hall, Poplar =

Municipal building in London, England

Old Town Hall
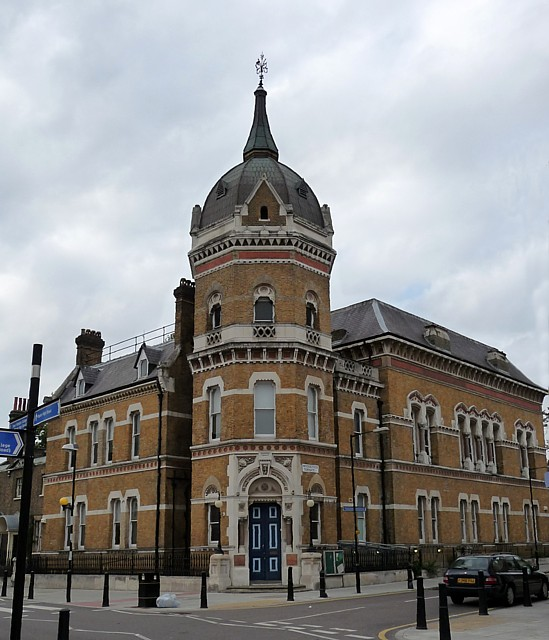
- The building in 2009

- Shown in Tower Hamlets
- 51.5091°N 0.0157°W
- Location: Poplar High Street, Poplar

History
- Built: 1870

Site notes
- Architect(s): Walter Augustus Hills and Thomas Wayland Fletcher with Arthur and Christopher Harston
- Architectural style: Gothic Revival style

Listed Building – Grade II
- Official name: Old Poplar Town Hall and Council Offices
- Designated: 1 July 1983
- Reference no.: 1260135

The Old Town Hall is a former municipal building at the corner of Poplar High Street and Woodstock Terrace in Poplar, London. The building, which currently accommodates the Lansbury Heritage Hotel, is a Grade II listed building.

== History ==
The building was commissioned by the Poplar District Board of Works to serve as its hall and offices. The site the board selected, on the north side of Poplar High Street, had been occupied by a row of alms houses erected by the East India Company in 1628.

Construction of the new building started in 1869. It was designed by Walter Augustus Hills and Thomas Wayland Fletcher with Arthur and Christopher Harston in the Gothic Revival style, built in yellow brick at a cost of £7,500 and was completed in October 1870. The design involved a distinctive three-stage octagonal tower at the southeast corner. The first stage involved a round headed opening flanked by Corinthian order colonettes supporting an archivolt and a keystone with elaborate carvings in the spandrels. There were sash windows on the first floor and sash windows with tracery on the second floor, all surmounted by a dome, a spire and a weather vane. The rest of the building was fenestrated by sash windows. The floors were separated by bands with mosaic detail. At roof level, there was a modillioned cornice and a series of dormer windows.

The building became the headquarters of the Metropolitan Borough of Poplar in 1900. It was the scene of the Poplar Rates Rebellion, led by George Lansbury, which advocated the use of rates for social reform, and ultimately resulted in 19 councillors being put in prison in 1921. The building ceased to be the local seat of government when the council moved to the new town hall in Bow Street in 1938.

The old town hall remained in council ownership, being used as a district housing centre from 1986, until Tower Hamlets London Borough Council sold it to a developer, Dreamstar Limited, in 2011. It was subsequently converted into a boutique hotel, opening as the Lansbury Heritage Hotel in 2015.
