= Ian Berry (artist) =

British artist (born 1984)

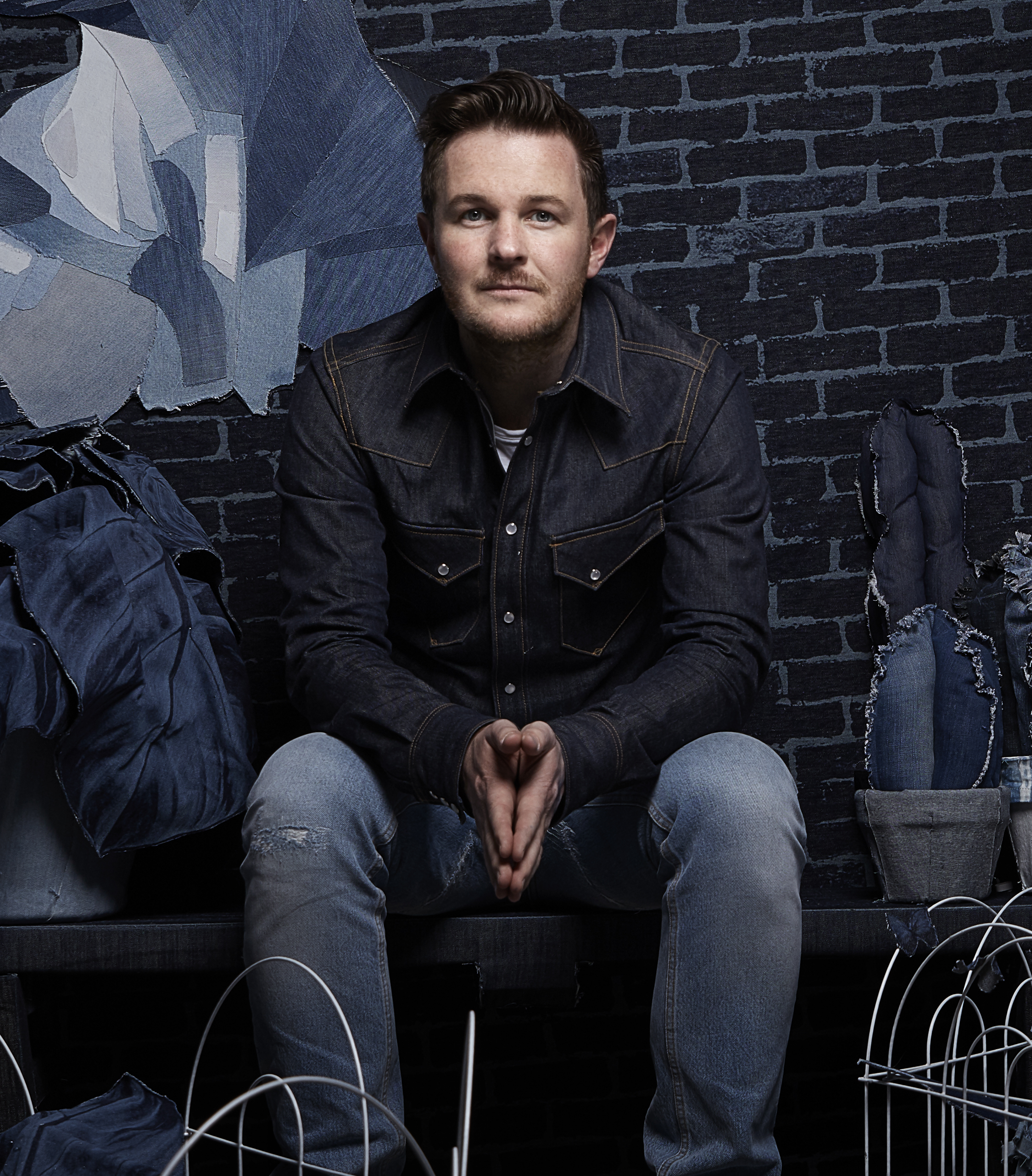
- Berry in 2018
- Born: Ian Berry; 1984 (age 41–42); Huddersfield, Yorkshire
- Movement: Arte Povera, Collage, Denim Art, Textile Art, Fiber Art
- Website: www.ianberry.org

Ian Berry, previously known as Denimu, is a British born artist based in Poplar, East London, who creates artwork solely from denim. Berry re-uses jeans, jackets, and other denim clothing to create portraits, landscapes and other unique works. In 2013, Berry was named as one of Art Business News's "30 under 30" influential artists in the world".

== Early life and career ==
Berry was born in Huddersfield, Kirklees, England in 1984, and has lived in Landskrona, Sweden and Sydney, Australia. Berry began experimenting with art while at university and then while working at TMW as an art director. In advertising he worked on brands like the RAF, Nissan, Guinness, British Airways and Talisker whisky. After first experimenting with denim at the end of university, he carried on while working as an art director in London, and then left to work in Australia. Berry started to work full-time on his artwork when he moved to Sweden from Australia. Apart from London, his artwork has been featured in galleries and Art Fairs across Sweden, Portugal (Calheta Madeira), United States (New Orleans, Miami, Fairmount, Asbury Park, Hamptons, Portland, San Francisco, Paducah).

== Medium ==
Berry works with textile, denim, stating in a Selvedge Magazine interview how 'you can't mix denim like you can paint'.

The idea for his denim artwork came from a simple observation while at his family home in Huddersfield. His mother knew he was never moving home so had cleared and sorted some of his room. There was a pile of denim where he noticed the different shades of indigo. Berry started to think of his relationship with denim and remembered a time when he was 14 and had to wear cords at a family party, and when he got there everyone was wearing jeans and even now, he says it is the only material he feels comfortable wearing and so it became the only medium he felt comfortable using.

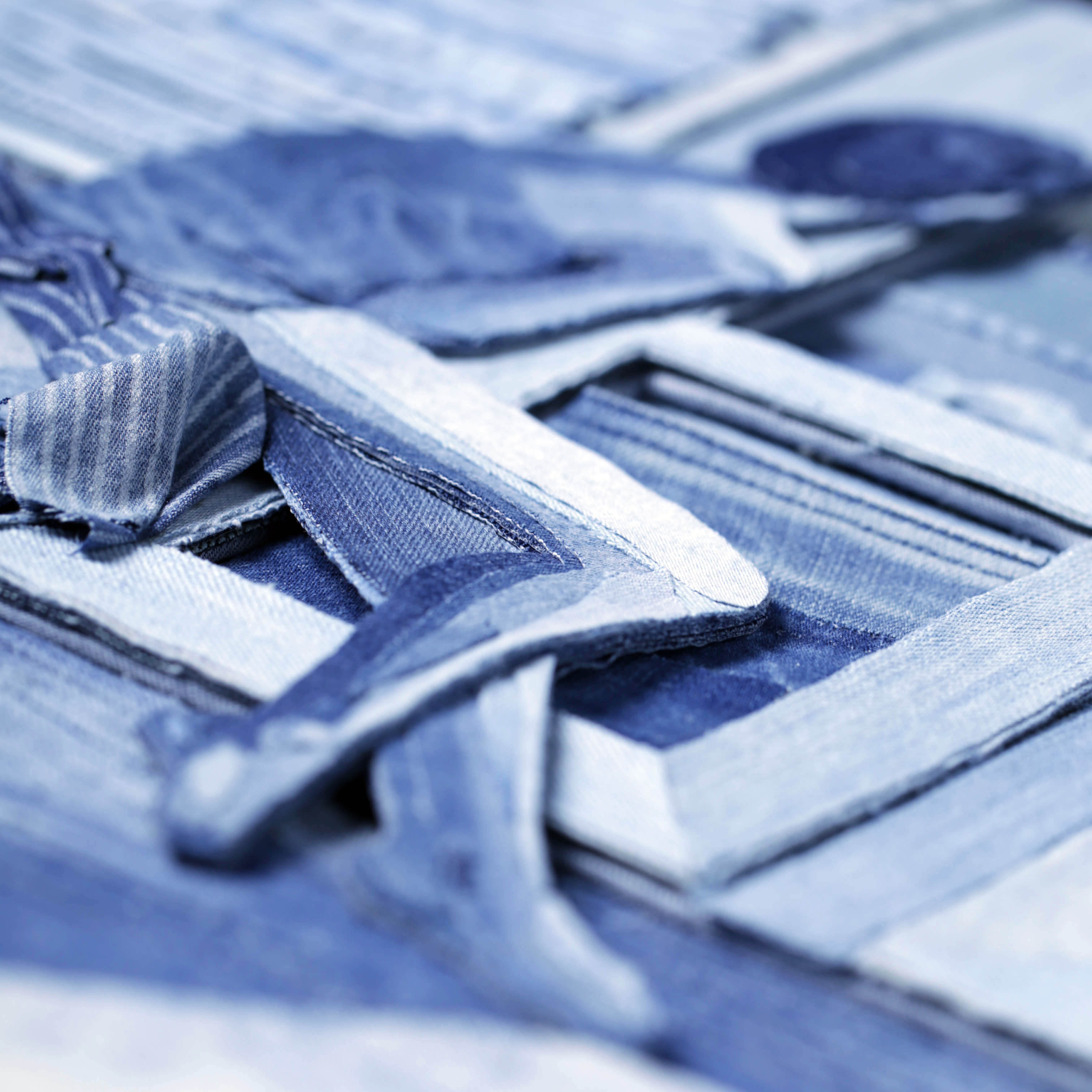
Detail of cut and layered denim on a Berry artwork

His process involves cutting, stitching, and gluing various shades of denim to provide contrast and shadow. Even at touching distance, many viewers don't realise that they are looking at many layers, and shades, of denim jeans. Many people compare it to Photorealism, but just with denim, not paint, 'your first impression is that of an indigo coloured oil painting, or a photograph in blue.'

In reality, Berry's pieces are very layered and three dimensional, something that gets lost once viewed online or in print. Many people can't believe they are made of denim.

Fellow artist Colin Fraser has said that Berry "uses denim as a painter uses paint, but with a difference: he makes what I call 'denImages'. The entire surface of these works is made from denim. The scissors are Ian's paint brush and he handles them with virtuosity."

In each work, the artist carefully selects denim samples that he cuts, trims, tears and then glues to create works of depth and space. This depth pushes the boundaries of conventional central perspective by building up layers that reach out from the picture plane and draw us in to look again.

The Vice Creators Project wrote he 'develops his work by selecting individual pieces of denim and certifying each is a unique wash. Afterward, all the many denim parts are layered to produce a three-dimensional collage effect. All together, the pieces collate into an established image from afar, bringing together light, color, and many of the elements of classic painting style.'

Berry has a studio in Poplar, East London where he has thousands of pairs of jeans organised in a palette from light to dark. The source is donations from brands, and denim mills. He has also sourced them from charity shops, vintage stores, and friends, receiving packages from around the world

It is often said that denim is the most democratic of fabrics, and he really feel like that he can tap into this, and he can communicate with people as there is something about the denim that draws them in, even if they find the work unusual, it is still something familiar. You don't need to be a connoisseur to enjoy denim, anyone can wear it he says. While it started as a very rural material, 'I feel now it is a very urban one, and the layers of urban life is what interests me and what I portray, so what better material is there to depict our contemporary life, than with the material of our time.'

As he portrays the changes in our cities, often depicting places that are closing down or at risk of with using denim he is adding a comment on the fading fabric of the urban environment".^{[37] [1]}

While many reports talk about it being made of only denim, Berry said "It is not about it being about denim. It's just my medium. Yes, it helps, but it's not about the material foremost. I see it as very much an urban material now. I love urban society and all the layers and depth within it and for me, what better way to portray contemporary life and issues than with the material of our time."

Berry's pieces are so detailed many talk of his work in terms of photorealism. Levis unzipped said 'from a distance, indigo's high contrast and gradient fades create a stunning illusion of depth, light, and ultimately, photorealism.' Berry does base his work of photography, photographs that he took and set up the scene.

Berry said "Admittedly at the beginning I often used parts like the pockets and seams to kind of say, 'Hey look, it's denim,' but now I use all those parts in a way to not show it's denim. Sometimes, this has been too successful though. [It's] maybe a compliment when people mistake it for a photo-realistic painting, but often people don't get to the 'aha!' factor when the penny drops—it's denim!"

Fiona McCarthy of the Sunday Times said 'one of a number of artists fusing the slightly loftier world of art with the often (unjustifiably) denigrated world of craft. Like Tracey Emin, Grayson Perry and Chuck Close before him, Berry is pushing the boundaries of Textiles as a medium, producing photorealistic denim collages depicting everyday scenes.

== Work ==
Berry lives in London and portrays the city he is surrounded by depicting the changing urban life He also had done a body of work on USA urban living with the American Jean^{[67]} which was based mainly on New York. Berry had seen that in many cities, the places that were meeting places for the community were changing, closing down for bigger development or left empty. Pubs were closing down, launderettes left empty, diners being replaced. He often depicted the places with scenes of loneliness.

Berry's work has also often been talked about in the context of Eco-Art, Upcycling and Recycling

Berry is a Contemporary Artist but his work has also been talked about in the context of Arte Povera, Collage, and also with his medium being denim Textile Art, Fiber Art, and while not using quilting techniques many quilters follow Berry and he is often mentioned in that context.

=== Behind Closed Doors ===
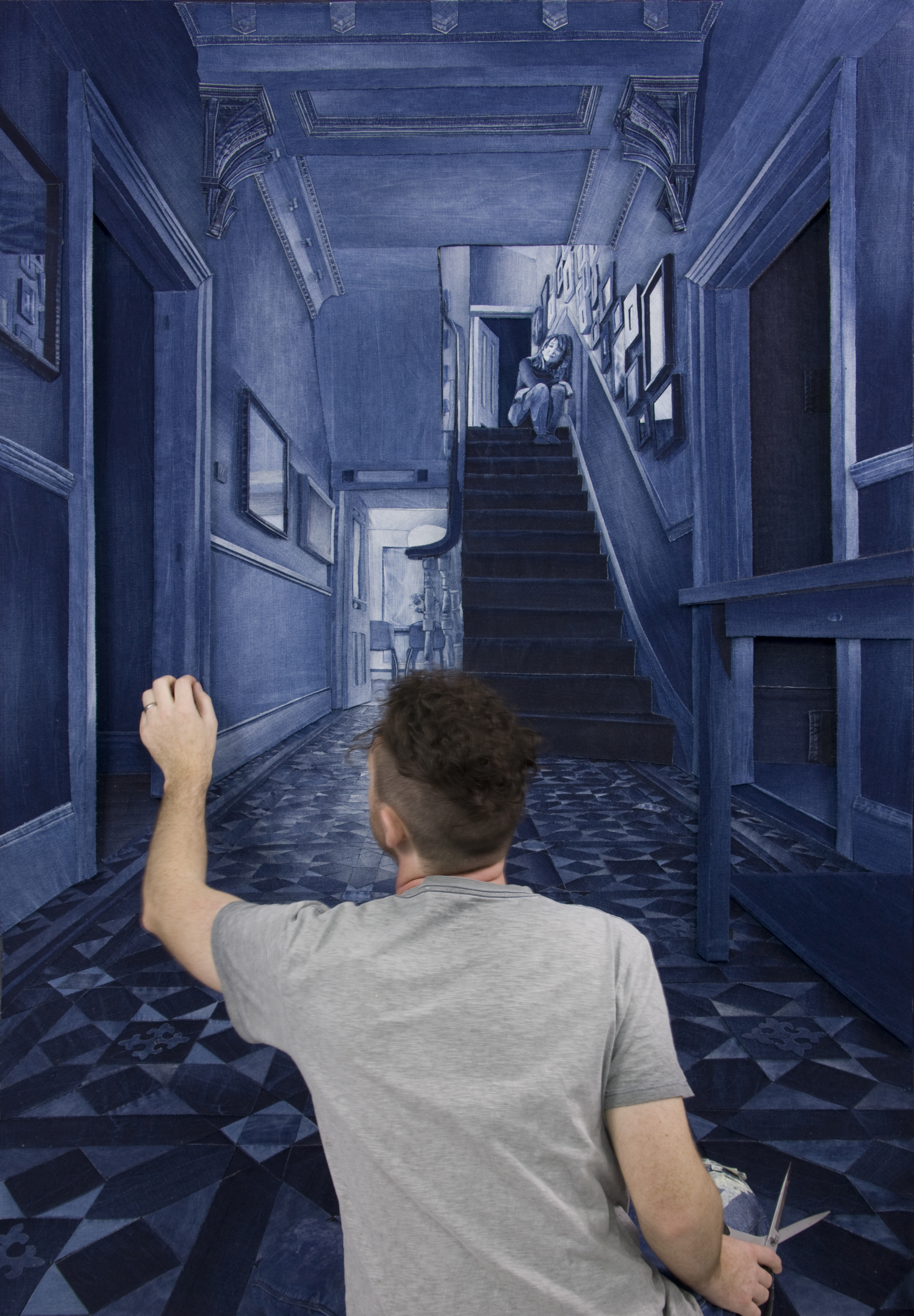
Berry working on Behind Closed Doors

Berry's 2016 London solo show was a success. The gallery had said "it's easy to get carried away with the novelty of the medium and forget that, first and foremost, Ian Berry is an artist with something to say. Well, in this two-part show he is speaking loud and clear". Art Critic Tabish Khan wrote it was a top 5 London Exhibition for Fad magazine 'What Berry can do with denim is astonishing. He creates multi-layered paintings, his attention to detail is superb and this exhibition is an impressive feat'.

Using art made from azure and bright navy swatches of denim, the show featured scenes reflecting the lives of London residents, and with a fixation on isolated interiors in keeping with the show title, Behind Closed Doors. There were collages of day-to-day life filled out in the medium of denim.

=== My Beautiful Laundrette ===
By the end of the 1970s, there were around 12,500 launderettes in the country. That number has now slumped to 3,000, with 450 in London. During one photoshoot, Berry went back to a launderette he had only visited on a recce the week before only to discover it boarded up. Berry portrayed the interior of launderettes in Crisp Street Market, Poplar, Bow, Ladbroke Grove and Holloway Road in London.

The body of work was a comment on the declining launderettes and what they meant to the community they served.

The title of the show was borrowed from a film based on the screenplay of Hanif Kureishi, and shot in the mid 80s. My Beautiful Laundrette, directed by Stephen Frears, captured a mood London at the time, the cultural tensions and the economic change but central to the film was the laundrette, one scene depicts a crowd of customers gathering outside, impatient to be let in. Laundrettes are now no longer like this.

The 'showstopper' was the installation however. Where people could interact and take photos and selfies and sit down and pretend they were waiting for their laundry. Berry made with set builder Luke Aan de Wiel a life-sized denim launderette with washing machines, dryers, tiled floors and walls, posters and instructions all made in denim.

=== Secret Garden ===
This interactive installation, titled the Secret Garden, was a piece that the viewer could walk through, on top of a denim path that was filled with various flowers and plants, from roses to cacti, wisteria to chrysanthemum that hung down like a trellis. It was shown at the Children's Museum of the Arts New York in 2017.

The installation for the Bridge Project was inspired by thinking of childhood. Immediately Berry thought of playing outside at his Yorkshire hometown. He believed children play less outside and interact and look less at the nature around. Children have new technology with iPads. He had stated that while he was making the Behind Closed Doors piece, he was thinking of a woman with a perfect home but the children had grown up, leaving the nest empty. The home depicted in the picture, there was a garden at the back. It made him think of the garden being full of the laughter of kids playing once upon a time and now the empty nest. As children would come to the garden in denim with their parents he wanted them to look at being in a garden differently and as in New York seek out a Community Garden together.

He wanted to draw attention to the community gardens as a meeting place and a location to enjoy being outside.

Berry also used some of the last fabric that the USA had produced to make the installation. After 112 years of production, Cone Mills, a historic denim mill in America, announced it would close its White Oak plant in North Carolina. As the last major manufacturer of selvage denim in the United States, its final products served as relics for newer generations to learn about in this exhibition.

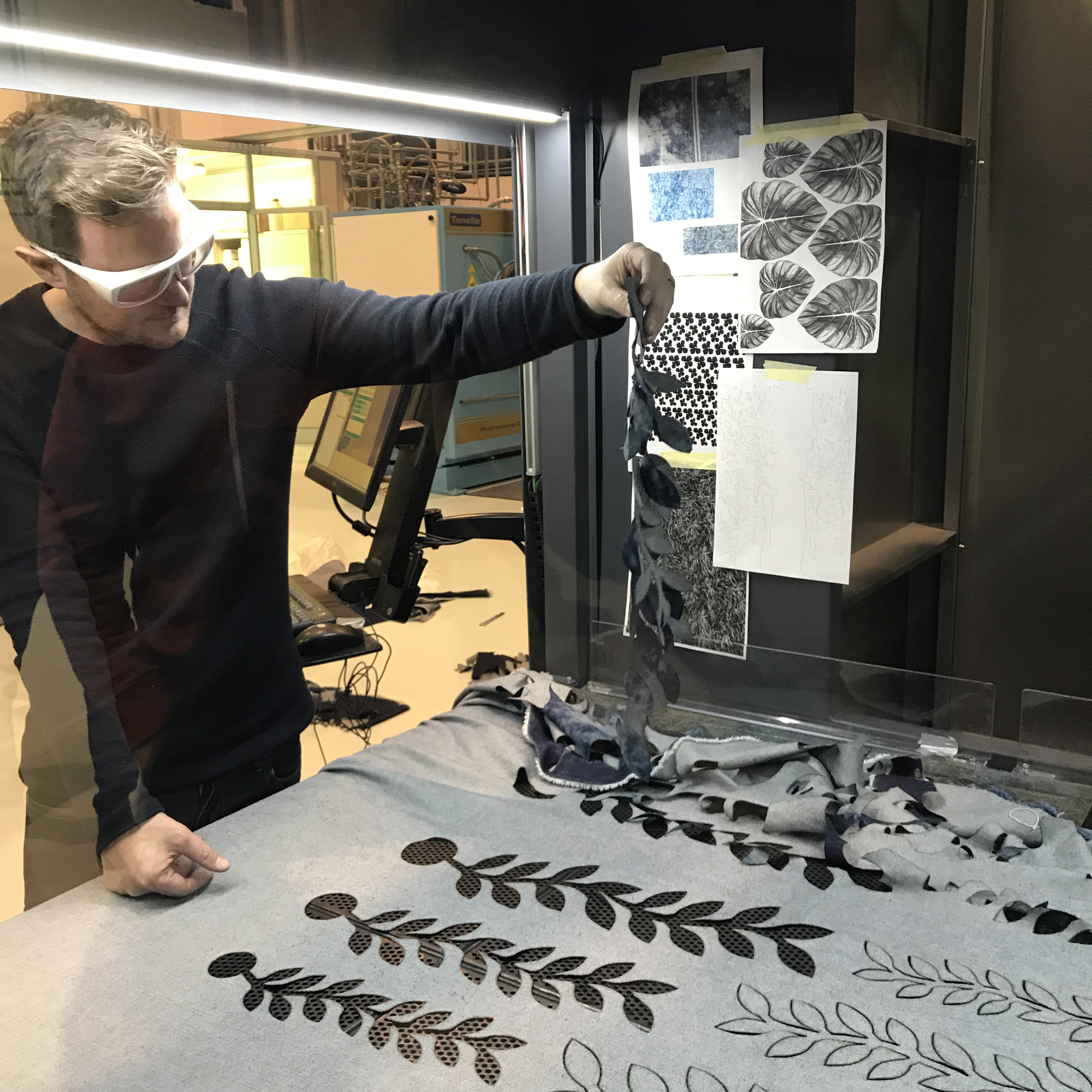
Berry at Tonello

It was also used as an example of sustainability. Berry worked with Tonello, the Italian laundry manufacturer and technology company. He used their laser machines in this work to cut many of the pieces made for the trellis, and used the ozone washing to colour the denim. These are now some of the new tools for the denim industry.

In the opening to the garden, Berry shows a cotton plant and explained that this is where the jeans we wear first comes from. The headline was from plants to pants, to plants again.

A version of the Secret Garden installation was shown at London’s Garden Museum in 2024, it was chosen as a top exhibition to see by Tabish Khan writing for Londonist.

=== Record Store ===
In 2013 Berry turned the gallery into a vintage record store. It was in response to the changing High Street and the loss of a lot of independent Record Stores in the UK, where many in the music community and like minded people would meet. The whole of the gallery window was turned into a vinyl store. It was filled with records, tee shirts, records and framed albums. It wasn't just any albums however, they were all chosen for their connection to the denim story.

Rock and Roll music and denim have gone together through time. With Elvis to heavy metal, Bob Dylan, hippies and punk, the pioneers of youth music have worn jeans. Many of the most famous album covers of all time feature this artisan fabric: the Rolling Stones' Sticky Fingers, and Bruce Springsteen's Born in the USA for example. In 1975, the musicians who hung around a New York bar called CBGB started to crop their hair and rip their jeans. The look was spotted by musician and designer Malcolm McLaren, who adapted it into punk back in London with the Sex Pistols. Berry was portraying much of this history. He spoke with Robert Elms about the albums, who he had met most of the people and bands depicted in the albums.

Warhol said of the denim: "I wish I could invent something like blue jeans. Something to be remembered for". Of course, he went on to design the jeans close-up cover for the Stones' Sticky Fingers album.

In 2018, Berry brought the Record Store back together in the US to make a whole high street, including the launderette (changed to Laundromat) and the Secret Garden (changed to a community garden) together with a gallery showing some of Berry's pieces.

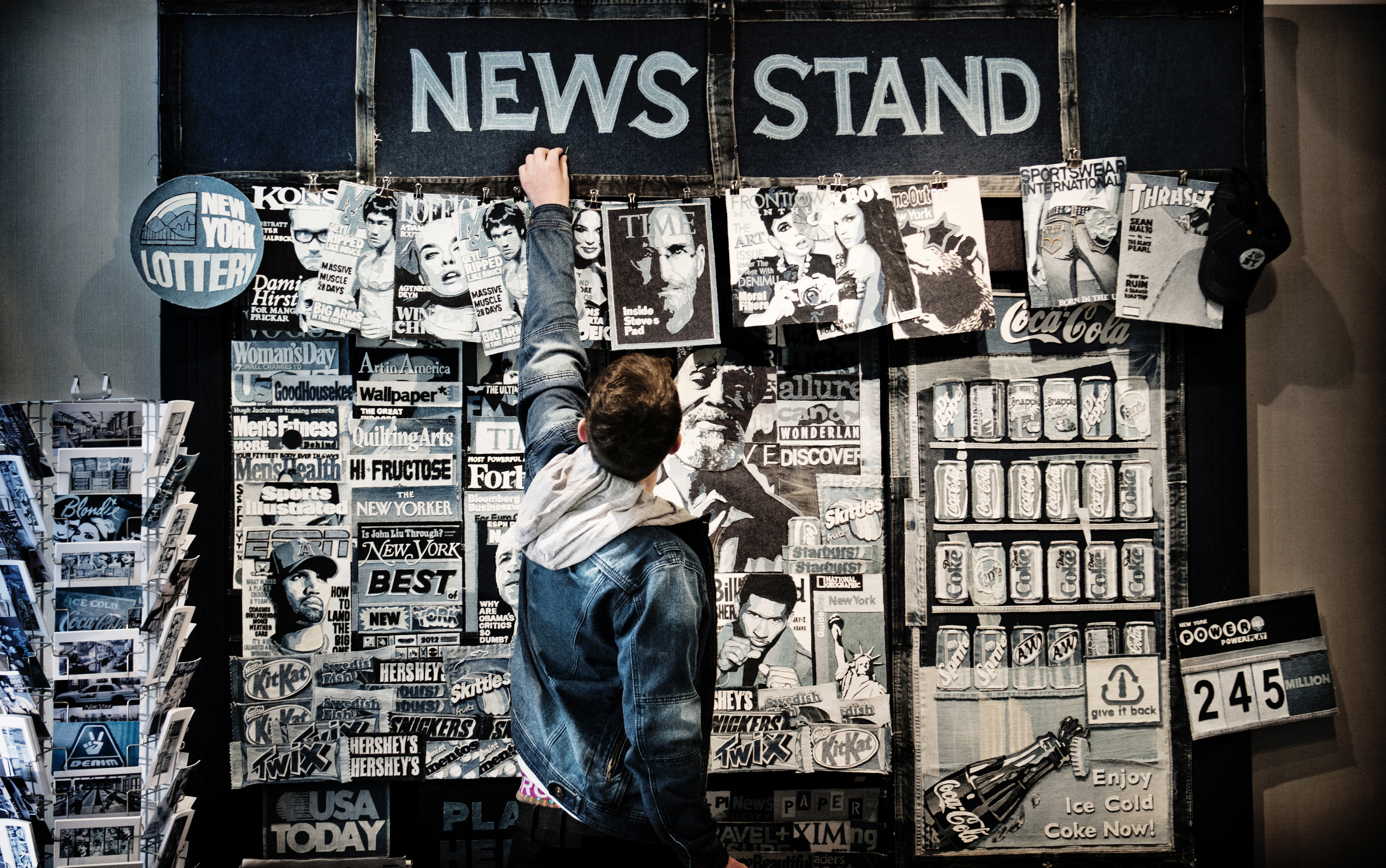
Newsstand

Other well known works include the Newsstand installation and the CCTV Surveillance piece.

== Portraits ==
Berry has made many portraits but has turned down most. He does portraits where the person has to have a connection to denim, and be respected and not just celebrity.

=== Ayrton Senna ===
Berry was commissioned to make a portrait of the late Formula One racing driver, Ayrton Senna, in 2015 to commemorate the 20th year of his passing. He immortalized Ayrton in denim, including jeans from the family of Ayrton who look after his legacy with the Instituto Ayrton Senna. The piece was unveiled in São Paulo, Brazil before the Grand Prix to the press and family and was met with positive reviews. The piece subsequently traveled around the world including to Amsterdam, Birmingham, Silverstone, Singapore, Rio, Barcelona Grand Prix, Turin at Adplog, at Williams, Hungary and Monaco

Respected Motorsport journalist Maurice Hamilton said 'I'm not in the least surprised that Ayrton's sister, Viviane, found it difficult to contain her emotions when she saw the work for the first time during an official unveiling last year. And the nice thing is that the entire project has been associated with the Ayrton Senna Foundation, for which Viviane and the family continue to do such good work in the name of underprivileged children in Brazil. There's a short but moody video on YouTube showing the unassuming and hugely talented Berry at work.'

At one Event in Birmingham there was an emotional showing and presentation of the people by many who knew Ayrton closely like David Coulthard, who replaced Ayrton in the team after he died in 1994, Allan McNish who had been his test driver as well as a former F1 driver and David Brabham who was in the same Imola race when Ayrton died.

Paul Weaver at the Guardian called it 'Berry's finest creation' and called the piece 'Stunning'. He also spoke how Berry didn't sign the piece 'as it wasn't about me, its about Ayrton' but Ayrton's mother insisted he signed it.

Berry liked the idea that it was the families jeans that made up his image, as they are the ones that are carrying on his legacy with the charity and also licensing and protecting his image. He also spoke how he had worked with denim brands, and was often seen in denim but what he especially loved is that like denim, Ayrton transcended so many people and demographics, but was ultimately a man of the people and denim represented that well.

=== Debbie Harry ===
In 2013 Luxottica launched a new Ray Ban Wayfarer, all made in denim and worked with Berry. At a launch party in New York Blondie performed and as part of the show a portrait of its leading lady, Debbie Harry was unveiled. Berry wanted to do the commission as Debbie Harry was a big part of the CBGB bands down the Bowery in the 70's. It was this group of bands that changed the history of music, but also denim. Debbie harry was also one of the first to be seen to wear double denim The portrait got rave reviews and reactions from the media on the opening night.

Berry became friends with Blondie's Guitarist Tommy Kessler and made his jacket that he has worn on stage since 2013 including at glastonbury, UK.

=== Giorgio Armani ===
Berry was commissioned to do a portrait of Giorgio Armani for a birthday gift from the Creative Director.

=== Lapo Elkann ===
Berry made a portrait of Lapo Elkann that now hangs above his desk. Elkann, is an Italian entrepreneur and grandson of Gianni Agnelli, the former controlling CEO and controlling shareholder of Fiat Automobiles. He is a big denim fan and had made a denim upholstery for a Diesel-edition Fiat 500 as well as a Smeg fridge all in denim. Vanity Fair magazine listed Elkann in its International Best Dressed List in 2008, and added him to its Best Dressed Hall of Fame in 2009. In an article with DuJour in 2013 Elkann said it was one of his 'prized possessions'.

=== Eunice Olumbide MBE ===
Berry made a portrait of his friend Eunice Olumbide in the year she got her MBE. Olumbide MBE is a Scottish model, film extra and curator. Berry made the piece for her Switch exhibition. The Exhibition was linked with Fuel Poverty Action a grassroots campaign taking action against mammoth fuel bills and working towards an affordable, sustainable and democratic energy system.

=== Other ===
Berry's early works have featured Icons of Denim such as James Dean and Marilyn Monroe, in fact one of the first pieces he did was of Debbie Harry, and he stated it was nice in later years to get the actually commission to do her portrait. Berry also went on to work with The Estate of James Dean and the James Dean Gallery to create a mural for Dean's hometown of Fairmount, Indiana. In the early years Berry did the portraits of the people because of their connection in the denim story.

== Education ==
Berry believes in art and creativity in education and has given a lot of time to schools, colleges and universities. He has given lectures all around the world and as well as in the UK; he has spoken in the US, Sweden, Brazil, Holland and gave workshops Many schools do projects on Ian Berry and children are inspired to make works in denim like him. Many education magazines have featured Berry's work including Scholastic, arts&activities, Science & Vie as well as National Geographic in Brazil and BBC Newsround in the UK.

Berry was so committed to this cause that he exhibited at the Children's Museum of Art New York where he showed the Secret Garden in 2017. In 2018 he travelled the United States and gave lectures in many schools and when he found that many students were inspired to do his work, but didn't have the correct equipment, Berry arranged for many companies to step in and donate tools like scissors, denim and rotary cutters. Many children, parents and teachers send him examples of their work inspired from him.

Most of Berry's family are or were teachers.

== Denimu ==
Berry dropped the Denimu name he had used at the beginning of his career.
