= Lansbury Estate =

Housing estate in East London

Coordinates: 51.516°N 0.018°W

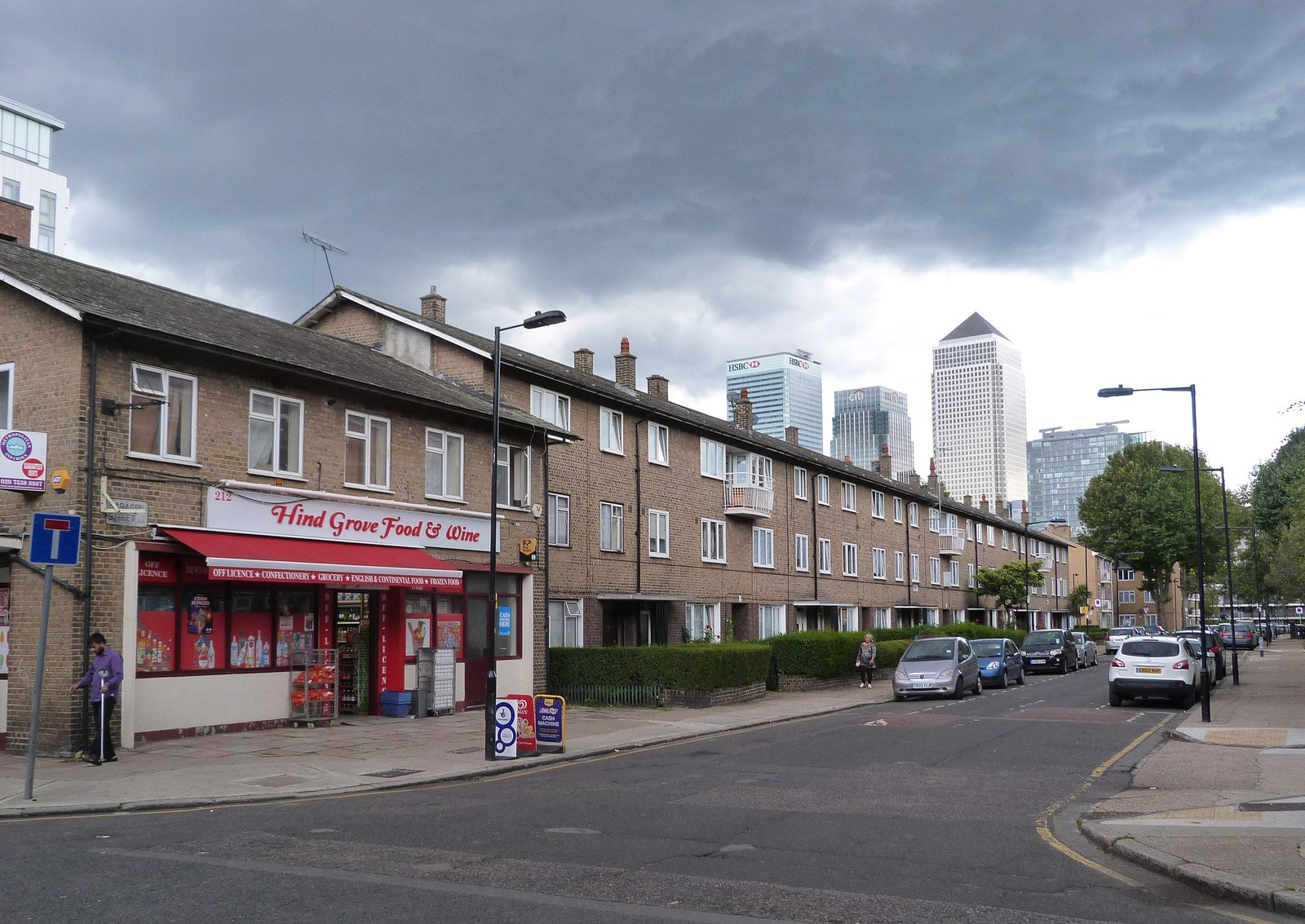
Houses on Saracen Street, built in 1951–52, form the north site of the Lansbury Estate

The Lansbury Estate is a large, historic council housing estate in Poplar and Bromley-by-Bow in the London Borough of Tower Hamlets. It is named after George Lansbury, a Poplar councillor and Labour Party MP.

== History ==
Lansbury Estate is one of the largest such estates in London. It occupies an area bounded by the East India Dock Road to the south, the Docklands Light Railway to the east and the Limehouse Cut canal to the north-west.

Layout of the estate, built on a site badly damaged by bombing during the Second World War, began in 1949 to a design by London County Council planners led by Arthur Ling and Percy Johnson-Marshall. Construction of the estate started shortly before 1951 as the Live Architecture Exhibition for the Festival of Britain, with Frederick Gibberd's Chrisp Street Market area and the Trinity Independent Chapel. The construction of the housing and other land-uses extended westwards, with the final phase, at Pigott Street, finished in 1982, near Bartlett Park.

The philosophy of the design was that new development should comprise neighbourhoods, and that within the neighbourhood should be all that a community required – flats, houses, churches, schools, an old people's home, a pedestrianised shopping area and covered market. There should be pubs and open spaces, linked by footways. Traditional materials were used in the construction, such as London stock bricks and Welsh slate to counter the modern architecture.

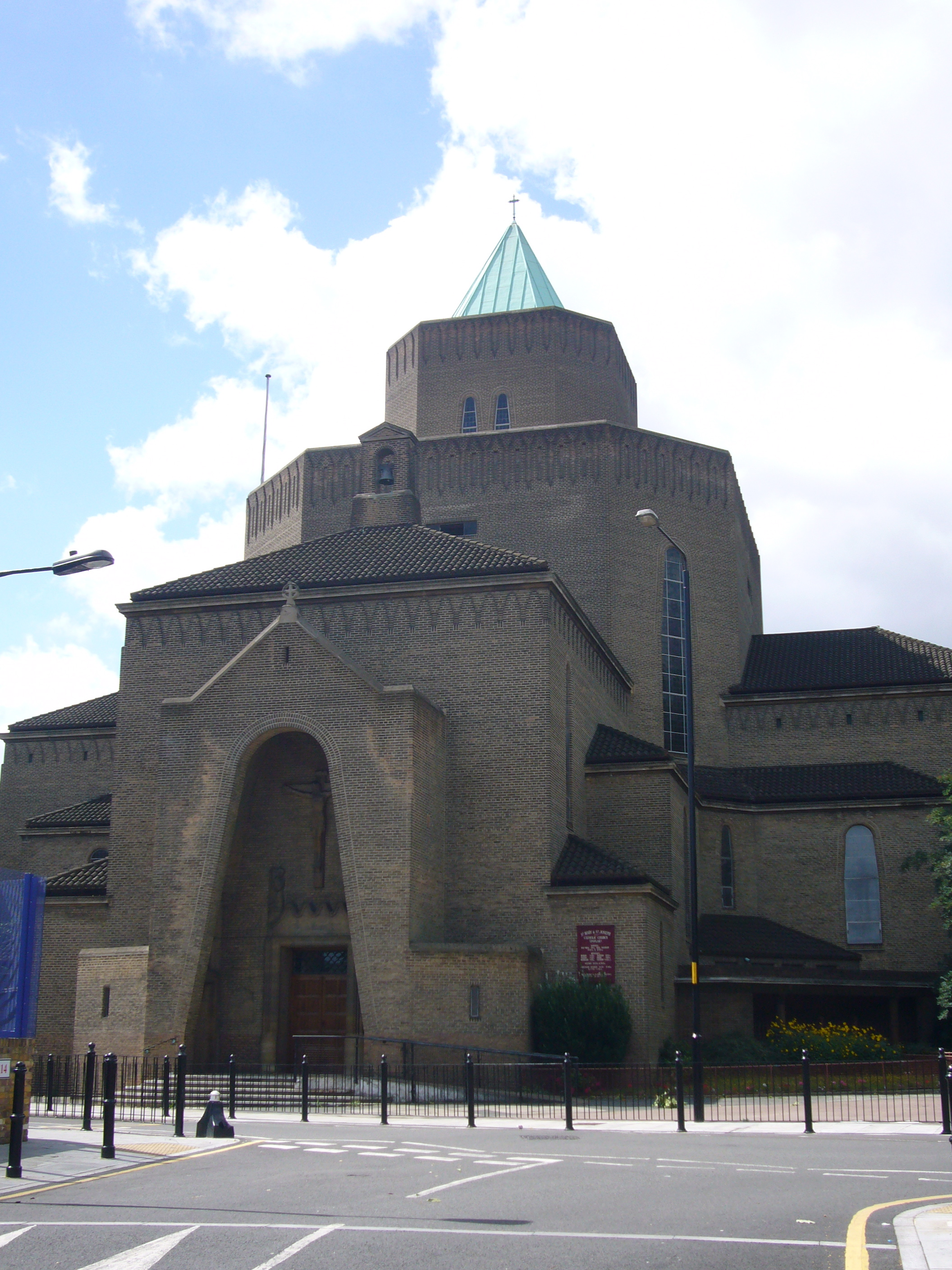
SS Mary and Joseph Roman Catholic Church

The architecture critic Lewis Mumford wrote of the Lansbury Estate (1953) "Its design has been based not solely on abstract aesthetic principles, or on the economics of commercial construction, or on the techniques of mass production, but on the social constitution of the community itself, with its diversity of human interests and human needs. Thus the architects and planners have avoided not only the clichés of ´high rise´ building but the dreary prisonlike order that results from forgetting the very purpose of housing and the necessities of neighbourhood living."

English Heritage has recognised the significance of the estate by listing some of the buildings including the SS Mary and Joseph Roman Catholic Church designed by Adrian Gilbert Scott; however, it noted that the estate has suffered considerable neglect, and also some well-meaning but ill-advised modernisation of the facilities within the associated market.

John Betjeman thought highly of the estate, along with the nearby St John's Estate on the Isle of Dogs.

The Lansbury Estate was owned by the GLC and later by Tower Hamlets Council. After a stock transfer in 1998, the property was transferred to Poplar HARCA.

== Transport ==
=== Trains ===
Langdon Park DLR station and All Saints DLR station serve the estate. Bromley-by-Bow tube station and Bow Road tube station are the nearest London Underground stations to the area. Limehouse station is the nearest National Rail station.

=== Buses ===
London Buses Routes 309 serve the centre of the area. With 15, 115, D6, D7, D8, 277, 135, D3 all serving the edge of the estate.
