= Metropolitan Borough of Poplar =

Former metropolitan borough of the County of London, in the United Kingdom

Coordinates: 51.519°N 0.018°W

Poplar
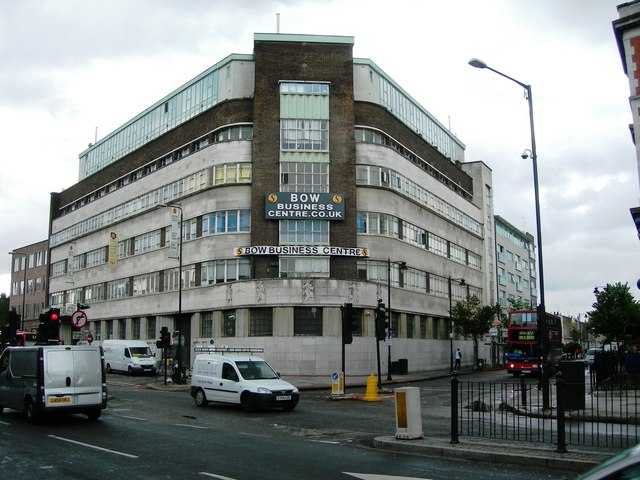
- Former Poplar Town Hall, Bow Road

- Poplar within the County of London
- Area
  - 1911: 2,328 acres (9.42 km^{2})
  - 1931: 2,331 acres (9.43 km^{2})
  - 1961: 2,348 acres (9.50 km^{2})
- Population
  - 1911: 162,442
  - 1931: 155,089
  - 1961: 66,604
- Density
  - 1911: 70/acre
  - 1931: 66/acre
  - 1961: 28/acre
- History
  - Origin: Metropolis Management Act 1855
  - Created: 1855
  - Abolished: 1965
  - Succeeded by: London Borough of Tower Hamlets
- Status: District (1855—1900); Metropolitan borough (1900—1965); Civil parish (1907—1965)
- Government: Poplar District Board of Works (1855—1900); Poplar Metropolitan Borough Council (1900—1965)
  - HQ: East India Dock Road (1856—1870); Poplar High Street (1870—1938); Bow Road (1938—1965)
- Borough seal
- Subdivisions
  - Type: Civil parishes
  - Units: Bow (1855—1907); Bromley (1855—1907); Poplar (1855—1907); Poplar Borough (1907—1965)
- Map of borough boundary

Poplar was a local government district in the metropolitan area of London, England. It was formed as a district of the Metropolis in 1855 and became a metropolitan borough in the County of London in 1900. It comprised Poplar, Millwall, Bromley-by-Bow and Bow as well as Old Ford, Fish Island and Cubitt Town.

== Formation and boundaries ==
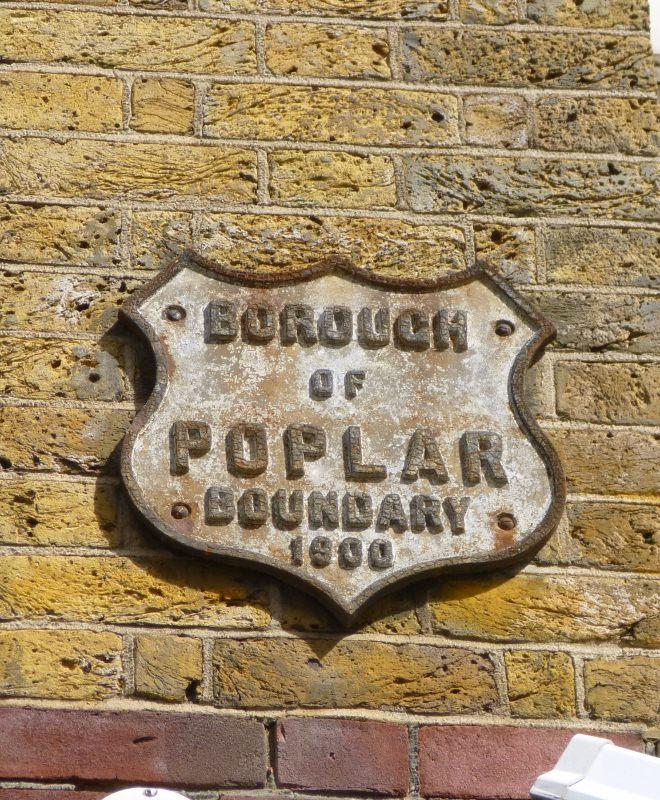
Old Boundary Marker on Three Colt Street.

The borough formed part of the then London suburbs and was bordered by the metropolitan boroughs of Hackney to the north, Stepney and Bethnal Green to the west, and the county borough of West Ham, then in Essex, to the east. To the south, the River Thames formed borders with the metropolitan boroughs of Bermondsey, Deptford and Greenwich.

It was formed from three civil parishes: St Mary Stratford-le-Bow, St Leonard Bromley and All Saints Poplar. In 1907, these three were combined into a single civil parish called Poplar Borough, which was conterminous with the metropolitan borough. In 1965, the parish and borough were abolished, with their former areas becoming part of the newly formed London Borough of Tower Hamlets.

It included the districts of (from north to south):

- Bow
- Bromley St Leonard
- Poplar
- Blackwall
- Isle of Dogs

== History ==
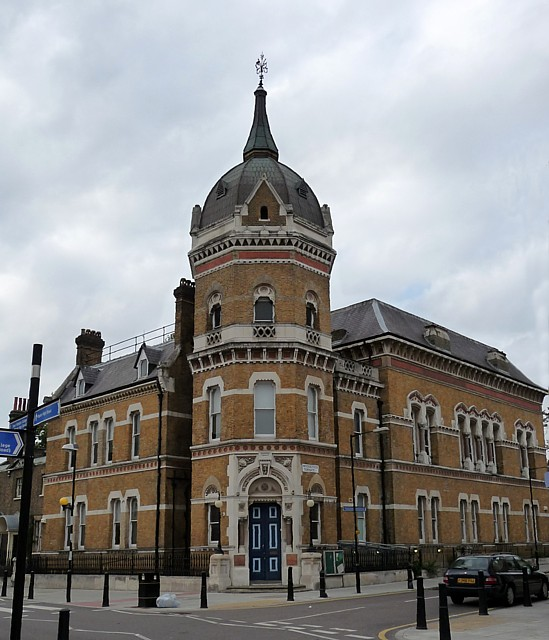
Old Town Hall, Poplar High Street

In 1921, the borough council, under George Lansbury and the Poor Law Union, were engaged in a dispute with the London County Council and central government over poor law rates – it wished to pay out of work people more than usually permitted, and to get wealthier boroughs to contribute to its expenses. Several councillors were imprisoned briefly in 1921 concerning this. See Poplar Rates Rebellion.

In 1951, Poplar was chosen as the site of the Festival of Britain's 'Exhibition of Live Architecture'. The East End of London had been heavily bombed during the war, and its reconstruction was showcased at the new Lansbury Estate. New building materials and planning concepts were demonstrated. The first example of 'live architecture' on the exhibition trail was the Trinity Congregational Church and Hall, located just across from the main reception area, with its Town Planning and Building Research Pavilions on East India Dock Road. The trail continued with the Lansbury Estate and Chrisp Street Market.

The former Poplar Town Hall, located on Bow Road and designed by Culpin & Son (1937–38), is now a listed building, as is its predecessor, the Old Town Hall (1870) in Poplar High Street.

== Population and area ==
Poplar covered an area of 2,328 acres (9.4 km^{2}). The population as given in the census from 1801 to 1961 was:

Constituent parishes 1801–1899

Year	1801	1811	1821	1831	1841	1851	1861	1871	1881	1891
Population	8,278	13,548	18,932	25,066	31,122	47,162	79,196	116,376	156,510	166,748

Metropolitan Borough 1900–1961

Year	1901	1911	1921	1931	1941	1951	1961
Population	168,822	162,442	162,578	155,089		73,579	66,604

== Borough seal ==
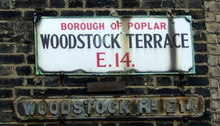
Borough of Poplar street sign

The borough had no coat of arms, using instead a seal originally designed for the Poplar District Board of Works, its predecessor, created by the Metropolis Management Act 1855. The seal depicted the emblems of the three parish vestries merged into the board.

The top shield was the seal of Poplar Vestry, and showed the 'Hibbert Gate' of the old West India Docks, with a sailing ship on top of the shield. A similar representation of the gate and ship formed the head of the vestry's civic mace, which was used by the board of works and borough council until 1965. The model ship from atop the gate, which was demolished in 1932, was placed by the borough council in Poplar Recreation Ground and Poplar Library before it collapsed.

The shield on the left was the seal of Bow Vestry and showed a bridge between two bows. This represented the bow-shaped bridge over the River Lea.

The shield on the right was the seal of Bromley St Leonard Vestry, and depicts the saint dressed as a bishop.

There remain several street signs which have been preserved with the name of the former borough.

== Politics ==
A map showing the wards of Poplar Metropolitan Borough as they appeared in 1916

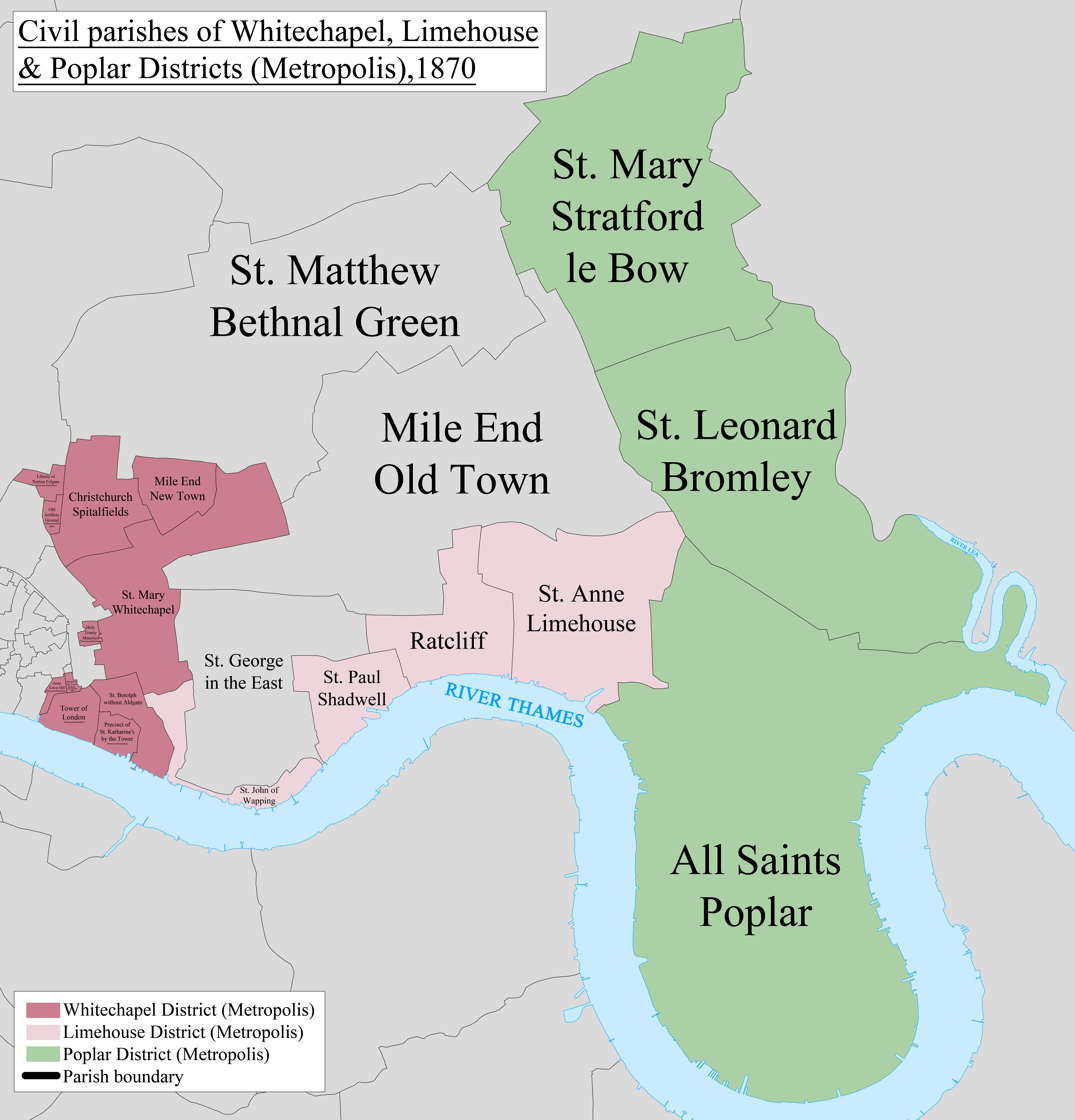
Civil parishes in Poplar as of 1870

Under the Metropolis Management Act 1855, any parish that exceeded 2,000 ratepayers was to be divided into wards; however, the parishes of the Poplar District Board of Works did not exceed this number, so they were not divided into wards.

In 1880, the population had increased enough for the parish of All Saints Poplar to be divided into three wards (electing vestrymen): South (27), East (27) and West (30).

In 1885, the population had increased sufficiently for the parish of Bromley St Leonard to be divided into three wards (electing vestrymen): West (39), East (36), and South (33).

In 1894, the population had increased enough for the parish of St Mary Stratford Bow to be divided into four wards (electing vestrymen): No. 1 (15), No. 2 (15), No. 3 (36), and No. 4 (18), while the parish of All Saints Poplar was similarly re-divided into four wards (electing vestrymen): Cubitt Town (15), Millwall (15), Blackwall (24), and West India Dock (30).

The metropolitan borough was divided into fourteen wards for elections: Bow Central, Bow North, Bow South, Bow West, Bromley Central, Bromley Northeast, Bromley Northwest, Bromley Southeast, Bromley Southwest, Cubitt Town, Millwall, Poplar East, Poplar Northwest and Poplar West.

=== Parliament constituency ===
For elections to Parliament, the borough was divided into two constituencies:

- Tower Hamlets, Bow and Bromley division
- Tower Hamlets, Poplar division

In 1918, the boundaries of the borough's two seats were adjusted, and one was renamed:

- Bow and Bromley
- Poplar South

In 1950, the borough's representation was reduced to one seat:

- Poplar

== See also ==
- London Government Act 1899
- Metropolis Management Act 1855
