= Poplar Town Hall =

Municipal building in London, England

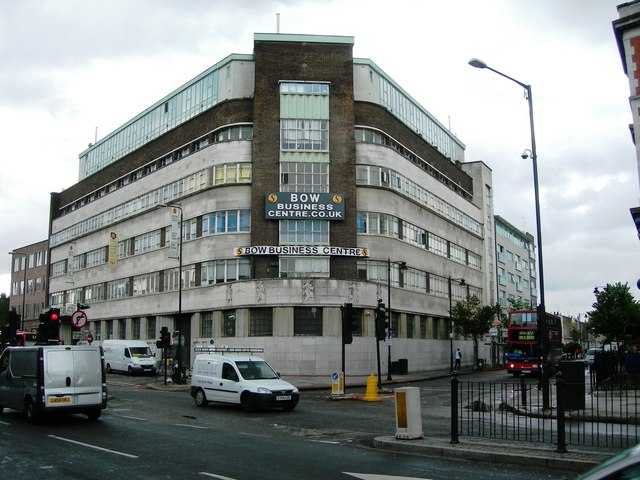
- The building in 2007

- Shown in Tower Hamlets
- 51.5284°N 0.0198°W
- Location: Bow Road, Poplar

History
- Built: 1938

Site notes
- Architect(s): Culpin and Son
- Architectural style: Modernist style

Listed Building – Grade II
- Designated: 24 February 2009
- Reference no.: 1393151

Poplar Town Hall is a municipal building at the corner of Bow Road and Fairfield Road in Poplar, London. It is a Grade II listed building.

== History ==
The building was commissioned to replace the Old Town Hall, located 1.7 miles (2.7 km) due south on Poplar High Street. The site chosen for the new building had been occupied by a 19th century vestry hall.

The foundation stone for the new building was laid by the former mayor, Alderman Charles Key, on 8 May 1937. It was designed by Culpin and Son in the Modernist style in a shape that took the form of a trapezoid. The design involved a rounded frontage at the junction of Bow Road and Fairfield Road; there were layers of continuous stone facing panels above and below a continuous band of glazing on the first, second and third floors. The Builders, a frieze by sculptor David Evans on the face of the building, was unveiled by George Lansbury at the official opening of the building on 10 December 1938. Made of Portland stone panels, it commemorated the trades constructing the town hall and symbolised the borough's relationship with the River Thames and the youth of Poplar. The principal rooms were the council chamber, the mayor's parlour and an assembly hall which benefited from a sprung Canadian maple dance floor. The architect, Edwin Culpin, claimed it was "the first town hall in this country to be erected in the modern style".

The building was proclaimed by the council to be the first town hall to be erected in the modernist style but ceased to function as the local seat of government when the enlarged London Borough of Tower Hamlets was formed in 1965.

After being used as workspace by the council until the mid-1980s, the town hall was sold in the 1990s to a developer who added a roof extension and converted it for commercial use. The complex had included a theatre, with a 35 feet (11 m) proscenium arch, which was demolished by the developer in 2000. The complex was subsequently used as a business centre.

The roof extension containing private homes was damaged by a fire on 23 August 2023.
