= Children's Museum of the Arts =

Museum in Manhattan, New York

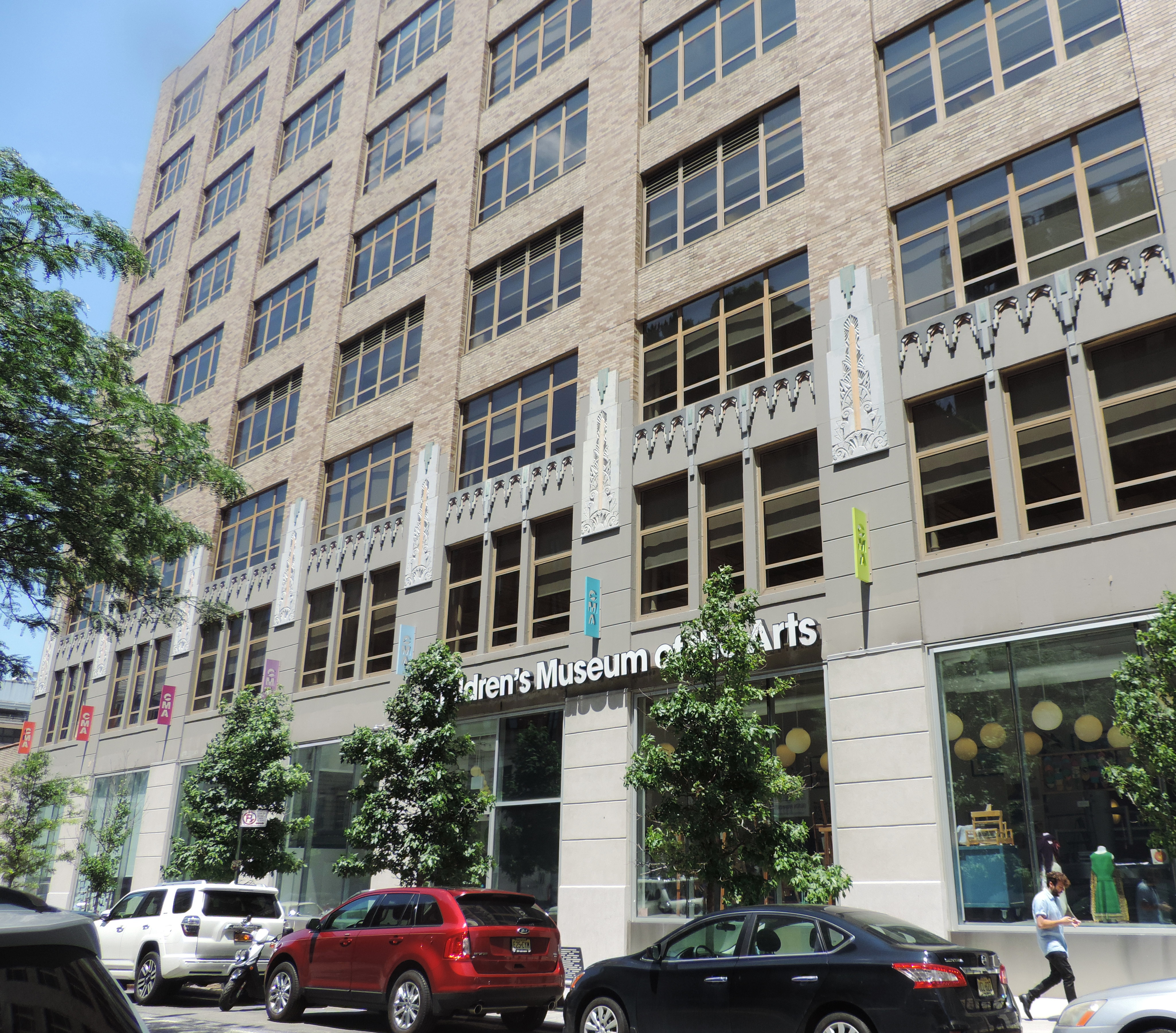
Charlton Street

The Children's Museum of the Arts (“CMA”) was a children's museum located at 103 Charlton Street, Manhattan, New York, United States in the South Village district from 2011-2022. The museum maintained a collection of over 2,000 pieces of international children's art dating back to the 1930s from over 50 countries.

== Exhibitions ==
CMA's inaugural exhibition in its new facility was “Make Art (in) Public,” a survey of art in the public realm by artists including Keith Haring, Christo and Jeanne-Claude, Friedensreich Hundertwasser, Tranqui Yanqui, and Swoon.

Ian Berry's 'Secret Garden' in 2017 was a garden out of denim. The denim used was some of the last made in the USA.

== Building ==
The museum was founded by Kathleen Schneider in 1988, and opened a new, 10,000-square-foot space in October 2011. The museum's physical building closed as a result of the COVID-19 pandemic, but they continued partnerships with schools. It declared bankruptcy and ceased operation in October 2024.
