= Poplar, London =

Area of East London, England

Coordinates: 51.5066°N 0.0178°W

Poplar
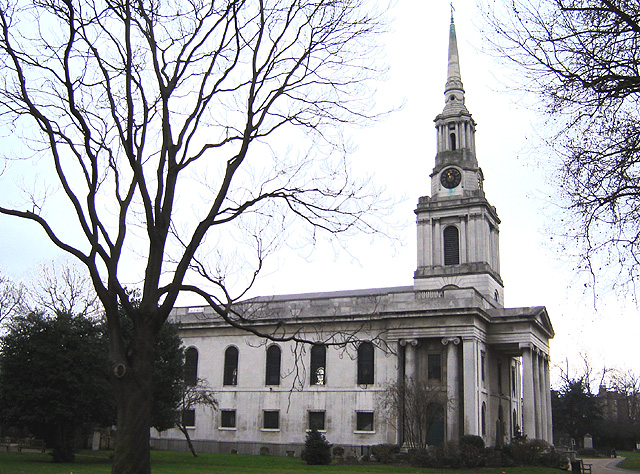
- All Saints Church, Poplar

- Location within Greater London
- OS grid reference: TQ375805
  - Charing Cross: 5.5 mi (8.9 km) W
- London borough: Tower Hamlets
- Ceremonial county: Greater London
- Region: London
- Country: England
- Sovereign state: United Kingdom
- Post town: LONDON
- Postcode district: E14
- Dialling code: 020
- Police: Metropolitan
- Fire: London
- Ambulance: London
- UK Parliament: Poplar and Limehouse
- London Assembly: City and East

Poplar is a district in the London Borough of Tower Hamlets. It is located five miles (8 km) east of Charing Cross and lies on the western bank of the River Lea.

Poplar is identified as a major district centre in the London Plan, with its centre being Chrisp Street Market, a significant commercial and retail centre surrounded by extensive residential development.

Originally part of the Manor and Ancient Parish of Stepney, the Hamlet of Poplar had become an autonomous area of Stepney by the 17th century, and an independent parish in 1817, the Parish and later Metropolitan Borough of Poplar. After a series of mergers, Poplar became part of the London Borough of Tower Hamlets in 1965.

== History ==
=== Origin and administrative history ===
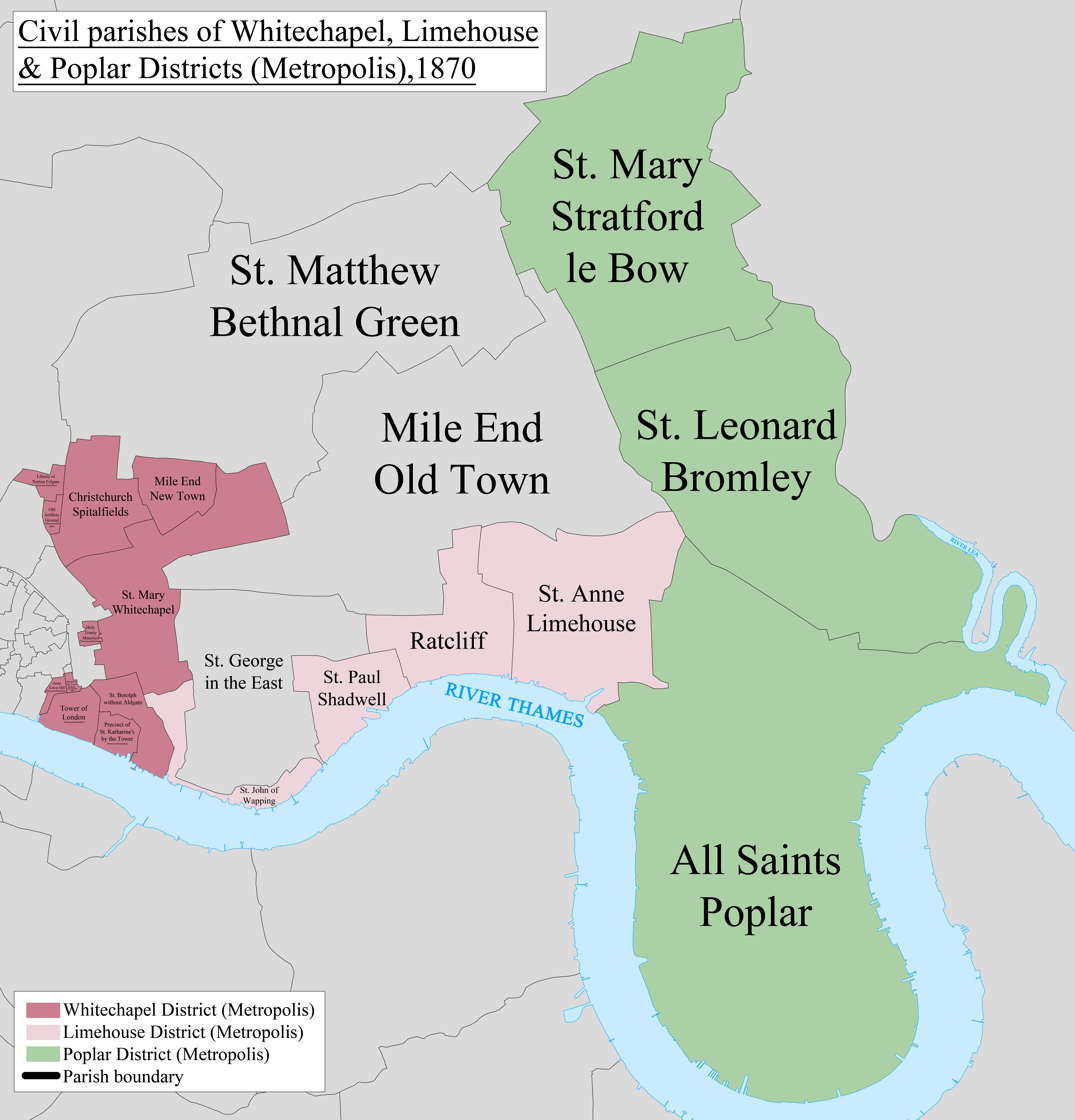
The parishes that would ultimately become the London Borough of Tower Hamlets.

The parish boundaries of Bow, Bromley and Poplar preserved in ward boundaries within the former Metropolitan Borough of Poplar.

Poplar was formerly part of the Manor and Ancient Parish of Stepney, and was first recorded in either 1327 or 1350. It took its name from the black poplar trees which once flourished in the area. Black poplar is a very rare and exceptionally large tree that grows well in the wet conditions which the rivers Thames and Lea historically brought to much of the neighbourhood. A specimen persisted in the area until at least 1986 when the naturalist Oliver Rackham noted "Nearby, in the midst of railway dereliction, a single Black Poplar even now struggles for life".

By the seventeenth century the area had become a hamlet, a territorial sub-division of Stepney, with a degree of independence. The hamlet of Poplar became an independent civil and ecclesiastical parish in 1817.

The area was part of the historic (or ancient) county of Middlesex, but military and most (or all) civil county functions were managed more locally, by the Tower Division (also known as the Tower Hamlets).

The role of the Tower Division ended when Poplar became part of the new County of London in 1889. The County of London was replaced by Greater London in 1965.

In 1855, Poplar joined with neighbouring Bromley and Bow to form the Poplar District of the Metropolis — though it remained an independent parish for some administrative purposes. The Poplar District (including Bromley and Bow) became the Metropolitan Borough of Poplar in 1900; population (1901), 168,822. In 1965 it merged with the Metropolitan Boroughs of Stepney and Bethnal Green to form the new London Borough of Tower Hamlets.

=== Social and economic history ===
In 1654, as the population of the district began to grow, the East India Company ceded a piece of land upon which to build a chapel and this became the nucleus of the settlement. St Matthias Old Church is located on Poplar High Street, opposite Tower Hamlets College.

There was a major ship fitting industry from at least the 15th century, and the maritime trades became more important after the East and West India Docks were opened in 1806. Thames Ironworks at Leamouth Wharf was a major employer till its closure in 1912, its works team becoming known as West Ham United F.C. The docks attracted very heavy bombing to the area during the Blitz.

In 1921, the Metropolitan Borough of Poplar was the location of the Poplar Rates Rebellion, led by then-Mayor George Lansbury, who was later elected as leader of the Labour Party. As part of the 1951 Festival of Britain, a new council housing estate was built to the north of the East India Dock Road and named the Lansbury Estate after him. This estate includes Chrisp Street Market, which was greatly commended by Lewis Mumford. The same era also saw the construction of the Robin Hood Gardens housing complex (overlooking the northern portal of the Blackwall Tunnel) – designed by architects Peter and Alison Smithson – and the similarly brutalist Balfron Tower, Carradale House and Glenkerry House (to the north) – designed by Ernő Goldfinger. Other notable buildings in Poplar include Poplar Baths which closed in 1989 and reopened in 2016 after the efforts of local campaigners.

The importance of the maritime industries attracted many overseas migrant to the area, including the Chinese community in the Pennyfields area of Poplar. This area, on the border with Limehouse was a part of the old East End Chinatown, most closely associated with Limehouse.

The West India Dock and other local docks had all closed by the end of 1980, so the British Government adopted policies to redevelop the docklands areas, including the creation of the London Docklands Development Corporation (LDDC) in 1981 and the granting of Urban Enterprise Zone status to the Isle of Dogs in 1982.

The Spratt's Complex was redeveloped and split into studio workshops (live/work units) and sold by JJAK (Construction) Ltd for leaseholders to fit out. The first building to be converted was Limehouse Cut, varying in size between 580 to 1,610 sq ft (54 to 150 m^{2}). The building was featured in the Sunday Times in June 1986 and again in 1989.

In 1998, following ballots of the residents, Tower Hamlets Council transferred parts of the Lansbury estate and six other Council housing estates within Poplar to Poplar HARCA, a new housing association set up for the purpose of regenerating the area. The following year, tenants on further estates voted to remain with the council. However, after a lengthy consultation of all Council estates in Tower Hamlets begun in 2002, most estates in Poplar did transfer to Poplar HARCA, East End Homes and other landlords between 2005 and 2007.

=== Wartime bombings ===
The first airborne terror campaign in Britain took place during the First World War, which caused significant damage and took many lives. German raids on Britain, for example, caused 1,413 deaths and 3,409 injuries. Air raids provided an unprecedented means of striking at resources vital to an enemy's war effort. Many of the novel features of the war in the air between 1914 and 1918—the lighting restrictions and blackouts, the air raid warnings and the improvised shelters—became central aspects of the World War II less than 30 years later.

The East End of London was one of the most heavily targeted places. Poplar, in particular, was struck badly by some of the air raids during the World War I. Initially these were at night by Zeppelins which bombed the area indiscriminately, leading to the death of innocent civilians.

The first daylight bombing attack on London by a fixed-wing aircraft took place on 13 June 1917. Fourteen German Gotha G.IV bombers led by Hauptmann Ernst Brandenberg flew over Essex and began dropping their bombs. It was a hot day and the sky was hazy; nevertheless, onlookers in London's East End were able to see 'a dozen or so big aeroplanes scintillating like so many huge silver dragonflies'. These three-seater bombers were carrying shrapnel bombs which were dropped just before noon. Numerous bombs fell in rapid succession in various districts. In the East End alone 104 people were killed, 154 seriously injured and 269 slightly injured.

The gravest incident that day was a direct hit on a primary school in Poplar. In the Upper North Street School at the time were a girls' class on the top floor, a boys' class on the middle floor and an infant class of about 50 pupils on the ground floor. The bomb fell through the roof into the girls' class; it then proceeded to fall through the boys' classroom before finally exploding in the infant class. Eighteen pupils were killed, of whom sixteen were aged from 4 to 6 years old. The tragedy shocked the British public at the time.

In World War II, Poplar suffered heavily in the Blitz of that war, the Metropolitan Borough losing 770 civilian dead as a result of enemy action. At the height of the bombing, ten Poplar schools were evacuated to Oxford.

== Built environment ==
Architecturally, the area is a mixture of 18th- and 19th-century terraced houses and 20th-century council estates. Notable examples include the Lansbury Estate and the Balfron Tower.

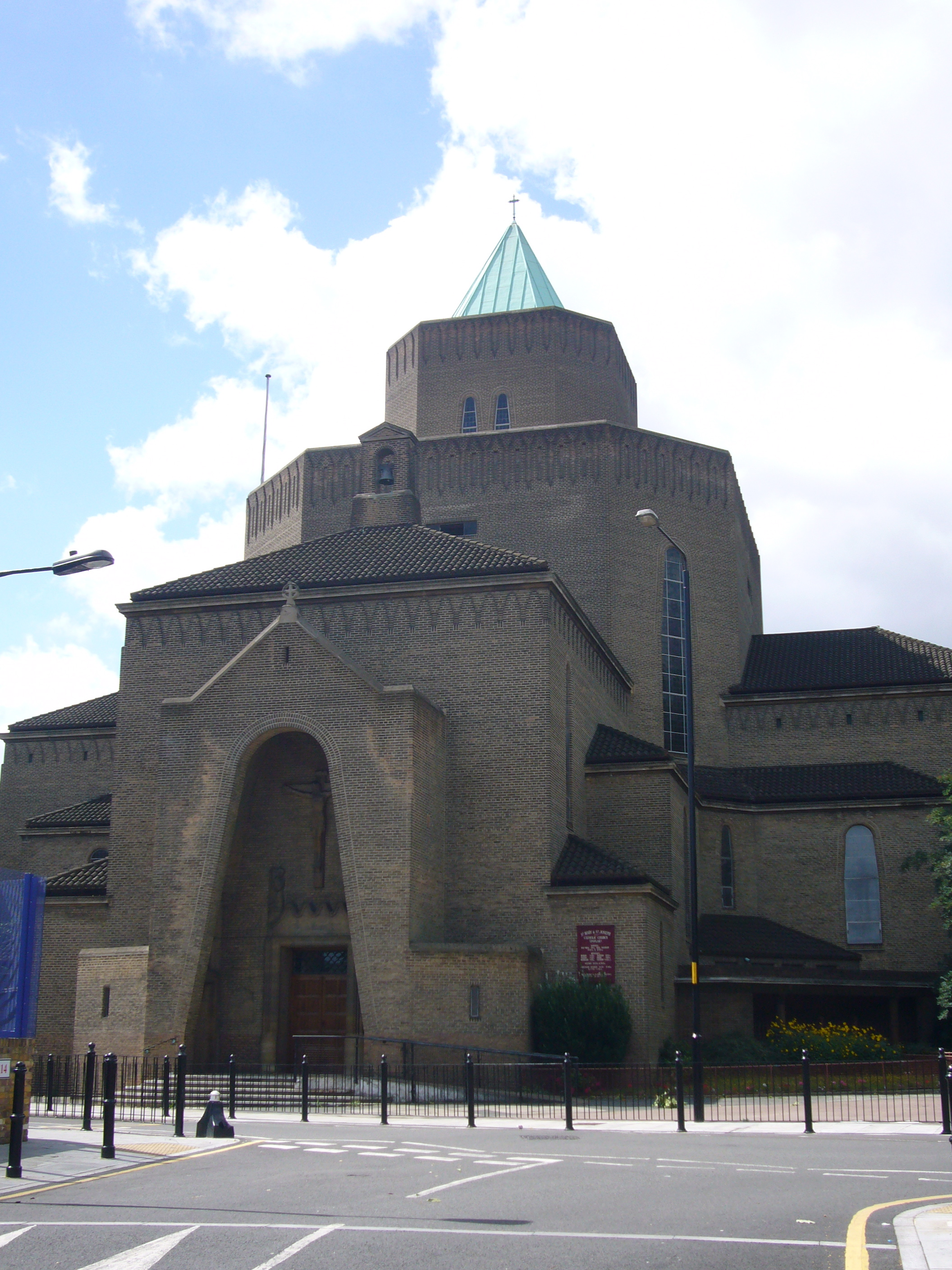
St. Mary and St. Joseph Church

A new Church Green next to St. Mary and St. Joseph Church was created in 2012 on the site of the former Blitz-bombed Catholic church, across the road from the current church designed by Adrian Gilbert Scott. It is open to the public during the day and public sculptures include, the former Catholic Boys' School entrance statue dedicated to dockers and seafarers, a 15-foot crucifix that stood on the site of the old high altar and a contemporary granite and light sculpture, A Doorway of Hope, by sculptor Nicolas Moreton.

Poplar High Street is host to a number of landmarks as it had previously been the principal street in Poplar. These include the Old Town Hall, which has mosaic detail and is now a hotel. Poplar Bowls Club, founded in 1910, is part of Poplar Recreation Ground A recently reopened sports centre called The Workhouse stands on the site of Poplar Workhouse, where local politician Will Crooks spent some of his earliest years (a nearby council housing estate is named after him). Another is the designated Grade II* listed St Matthias Old Church, now a community centre and formerly a chapel that was built by the East India Company in 1654.

The original Poplar Baths opened in 1852, costing £10,000. It was built to provide public wash facilities for the East End's poor as a result of the Baths and Washhouses Act 1846. The Baths were rebuilt in 1933 to a design by Harley Heckford and the larger pool was covered over to convert the building into a theatre and designated the East India Hall. Poplar Baths reopened in 1947 after the Second World War and continued to be used as a swimming facility, attracting on average 225,700 bathers every year between 1954 and 1959, the Baths closed again and was conversion to an industrial training centre in 1988. The Baths once again re-opened on 25 July 2016 and were removed from the Buildings at Risk register.

The Museum of London Docklands in West India Quay, opened in 2003 on the site of a grade I listed early-19th century Georgian "low" sugar warehouses built in 1802 on the side of West India Docks in the Port of London.

== Industry ==
Poplar still remains a part of the Port of London as Northumberland Wharf is still retained as a working wharf with special status from the Mayor of London and the Port of London Authority (PLA) as a safeguarded wharf. It is run by Cory Riverside Energy, which also managed the Reuse and Recycling Centre which is next to the wharf and for the transportation of waste by barge along the River Thames.

Poplar Borough Council had been authorised in 1893 to supply electricity to the borough. Electricity supplies began in October 1900 from a power station on the corner of Glaucus Street and Yeo Street. The equipment consisted of four Babcock-Wilcox boilers providing steam to four Belliss triple expansion engines driving four-pole 150kW Mather and Platt machines. The station was later known as Poplar Watts Grove (off Devons Road). The power station was upgraded in 1908 when 2 x 1MW turbo alternator set were installed. The buildings were further expanded to allow the installation of 2 x 3MW turbo alternator sets in 1913. In 1919 a 4,750 kVA set was added. By 1922 installed generation was 16,000 kW and plans were laid to extend the station. This was achieved in 1927 when it opened with a 10,000 kW turbo alternator and capacity to add a further set.

The generating capacity of the station and the electricity generated over the operational life is as follows:

Poplar (Watts Grove) power station, capacity and output
Year	Generating capacity, MW	Maximum Demand, MW	Electricity generated, GWh
1902	1.6		1.79
1903/4	1.6		2.47
1908/9		2.8	
1909/10		3.68	
1910/11		4.12	
1911/12	4.2	4.56	
1912/3	10.20	5.0	15.41
1918/9	13.25		24.38
1923/4	16.0		28.12
1936/7	40.0		14.76
1946			28
1960/1	24.0		1.31
1961/2	25.0		2.85
1962/3	25.0		7.92
1963/4	25.0		1.93
1965/6	25.0		18.07
1966/7	15.0		6.44

In 1903-04 there were estimated to be 320 arc lights, 1,649 incandescent lamps, and 130 electric motors connected to the public electricity supply in Poplar. The power station used water from the adjacent Limehouse Cut canal together with cooling towers to condense steam and for cooling.

Upon nationalisation of the electricity industry in 1948 ownership of the station passed to the British Electricity Authority and later to the Central Electricity Generating Board. The CEGB closed the station in 1967 when the thermal efficiency was only 8.39 per cent.

== Politics ==
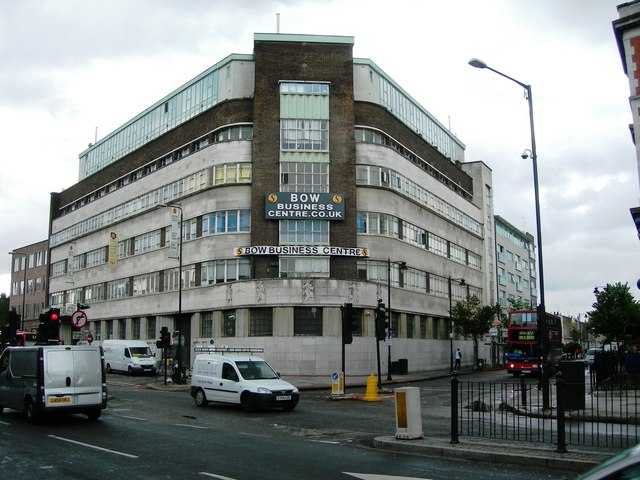
Poplar Town Hall, now a business centre

Until 1965, Poplar had its own council which was based at Poplar Town Hall. Since 1965, the area has formed part of the London Borough of Tower Hamlets, with its council based at Mulberry Place. The council moved to a new Tower Hamlets Town Hall in Whitechapel Road on 1 March 2023.

The Isle of Dogs and Poplar proper in general achieved notoriety in 1993 when Derek Beackon of the British National Party became a councillor for Millwall ward, in a by election. This was the culmination of years of resentment by local residents of perceived neglect by both Liberal Democrat and Labour Party politicians. Labour regained the ward in the full council election of May 1994, and held all three seats until a further by election in September 2004.

== Education ==
Langdon Park School is a mixed secondary school and sixth form, located northeast of Chrisp Street Market.

The George Green's School was founded in 1828 by George Green, a shipbuilder and shipwright. It was originally located on East India Dock Road. Today it is a voluntary controlled school supported by the Worshipful Company of Shipwrights located on the Isle of Dogs peninsula.

== Transport ==
=== Rail ===
Poplar is connected to other areas of East London by the Docklands Light Railway (DLR). Five stations serve the area, including All Saints, Langdon Park, Poplar, Blackwall and East India. DLR stations in Poplar are in London fare zone 2, and link the area to destinations such as Bank (in the City), Canary Wharf, City Airport, Greenwich, and Stratford.

Poplar DLR station is a focal point for the DLR network, where several different routes converge.

The nearest London Underground station is Canary Wharf, which is served by Elizabeth line and Jubilee line trains.

The nearest National Rail station is at Limehouse, which is served by c2c trains between London Fenchurch Street (in the city) and destinations in South Essex, including Southend Central.

=== Buses ===
Poplar is served by London Buses routes 15, 108, 115, 309, D6, D7, D8 and night bus routes N15 and N551.

=== Road ===
Poplar is well connected to destinations in East London and East Anglia by road:

- The A12 runs along the eastern edge of Poplar and carries traffic northbound towards Stratford and Hackney Wick. It continues towards the M11, Romford, and Chelmsford. Its southern terminus is in Poplar, at a junction with the A13 and A102.
- The A13 (East India Dock Road) runs through the centre of Poplar west-east. Westbound, the A13 links the area to Limehouse, Aldgate, and the city. Heading east, the road runs towards Canning Town, Barking, Tilbury, and Southend-on-Sea.
- The A102 (Blackwall Tunnel) begins on the eastern side of Poplar at a junction with the A12 and A13. The road runs underneath the River Thames towards the Greenwich Peninsula, the A2, and south-east London.
- The A1206 (Cotton Street) runs from the A13 through the eastern edge of Poplar. South of Aspen Way, the road runs around the outer rim of the Isle of Dogs, connecting Poplar to Canary Wharf and Millwall.
- The A1261 (Aspen Way) runs along the southern rim of Poplar, separating the area from Canary Wharf. Aspen Way runs eastbound towards the Limehouse Link and the A13, both of which continue towards Limehouse and the city. Westbound, the road runs to Blackwall, the A13, and the A1020 towards the ExCeL and City Airport.

Poplar High Street runs through the centre of Poplar.

=== Cycling ===
Cycle Superhighway 3 (CS3) passes east–west through Poplar, along Poplar High Street. The route runs unbroken and signposted westbound towards Lancaster Gate (Hyde Park) via Shadwell, the city, Victoria Embankment, and Parliament Square. Eastbound cyclists leave Poplar on Naval Row, following signposts towards Canning Town and the A13. The route runs alongside the A13 towards Canning Town, East Ham, and Barking.

National Cycle Route 13 follows the route of CS3 through Poplar. This long-distance route links Tower Hill to Fakenham, Norfolk. The route does not run continuously; however, east of Poplar, the route runs non-stop as far as Purfleet, via the ExCeL and Rainham.

== In art, entertainment, and media ==
Balfron Tower has been featured in various other music videos, films and television programmes, as have various other locations in Poplar. According to movie website IMDb, locations around Poplar have been used in the following feature films:

- 1984 (1956)
- To Sir, With Love (1967)
- A Fish Called Wanda (1988)
- The World Is Not Enough (1999)
- The Da Vinci Code (2003)
- 28 Days Later (2002; Woodstock Terrace and Balfron Tower)

=== Film ===
- The documentary film Fly a Flag for Poplar (1974) features Poplar and the people who live there, seen in their day-to-day lives and organising their own local festivals. Poplar today is looked at in the light of the past, the importance of the Labour movement in the beginning of the century, highlighted by the great strikes and events of 1921 when the Poplar Council went to prison.
- A documentary film about Chrisp Street Market, E14: A Dying Trade, was filmed in 2011.

=== Television ===
- The BBC One television series, Call the Midwife, is set in Poplar in the late 1950s through 1968 in season 12.

=== Art ===
- The AB Foundry is in Poplar and has worked with artists like Anthony Gormley, Henry Moore, Gavin Turk, Rachel Whiteread, and Barry Flanagan.
- The Poplar Union was built as an art centre within a Poplar HARCA's resident building. Poplar Union is now home to e5 Roasthouse. It supports the local community through art, culture and wellbeing, and offers a programme of events, including family activities, performances in comedy, spoken word, music, dance and theatre, health and wellbeing classes.
- While not as famous as a street art destination as its Hackney Wick neighbour, Poplar has a number of notable street art pieces, especially around the Chrisp Street Market area. American Artist Above, Malarky, Cawaiikawaii, Lilly Lou and Gary Stranger have all done work there, especially on the shop shutters. Irony and Boe painted a giant chihuahua on the side of the building opposite All Saints DLR station. There is also a small work by Banksy near to the chihuahua.
- Notable artists who have lived in the area are Michael Green, Ian Berry, Elizabeth Fritsch MA(RCA) CBE and Stuart Semple, who all lived and worked in the Spratts complex and in 2014 many artists took up spaces with Bow Arts Trust in Balfron Tower.

== Notable residents ==
- Teddy Baldock, "The Pride of Poplar", Commonwealth Boxing Bantamweight Champion 1928–30
- Neil Banfield, coach at Arsenal F.C.
- Will Crooks MP, social reformer and first Labour mayor in London; the Will Crooks estate on Poplar High Street is named after him
- Alfie Doughty, footballer for Luton Town
- Tommy Flowers, designer of the Colossus computer, the first programmable electronic computer used for code breaking at Bletchley Park, born at 160 Abbott Road
- Alfred Hitchcock, film director, lived in Salmon Lane as a child. His family had a fishmongers there and lived above the shop.
- Sir Nicholas de Loveyne held the manor of Poplar and made his will there in 1375, four days before he died.
- Charlie Magri, world champion flyweight boxer, grew up on the Burdett Estate.
- Arthur Morrison, author and journalist.
- John McDougall, politician, represented Poplar from 1889 to 1913. A small park near Millwall Dock is named after him.
- John Mucknell, "The King's Pirate" (born 1608, lived in Poplar after he married)
- Harry Redknapp, football manager, formerly of Bournemouth, West Ham United, Southampton, Portsmouth, Tottenham Hotspur and Queens Park Rangers football clubs. Father of Jamie Redknapp, the former Liverpool captain
- Richard Spratly, discoverer of the Spratly Islands in 1843
- H. M. Tomlinson, travel-writer, journalist, and author of The Sea and the Jungle (1912)
- Jennifer Worth, Call the Midwife author
- Rip, search and rescue dog, and Dicken Medal recipient.
- James Wimshurst, inventor, engineer and shipwright. Known as the creator of the electrostatic generator (Wimshurst machine).
