= Chrisp Street Market =

Market in Poplar, London

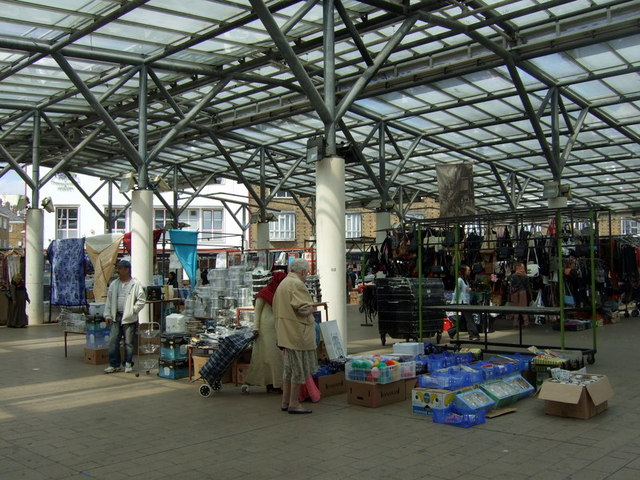
- The market stalls are located under a canopy
- Location: Chrisp Street; Poplar, Tower Hamlets, Greater London; 51.5125°N 0.0144°W
- Opening date: 1951 (relocated from street)
- Management: Tower Hamlets London Borough Council
- Owner: Poplar HARCA
- Architect: Frederick Gibberd
- Environment: Covered
- Goods sold: General goods
- Days normally open: Monday–Saturday
- Number of tenants: 80
- Website: www.chrispstreet.org.uk
- Interactive map of Chrisp Street Market

Chrisp Street Market is the central marketplace and town centre of Poplar and is located in the London Borough of Tower Hamlets. It was the first purpose-built pedestrian shopping area in the United Kingdom, rebuilt as part of the 1951 Festival of Britain and is directly connected onto the high street, East India Dock Road.

It features a prominent clock tower, shops, small retail outlets, pubs, cafes, flats, and 80 market stalls.

== History ==
Chrisp Street Market was designed by Frederick Gibberd, and built as part of the Festival of Britain in 1951. Since 1997 it has been in a conservation area.

In the 1990s, the London Docklands Development Corporation contributed £1.3 million to refurbishment of the market area.

In the early 2000s, Chrisp St Library was closed and replaced with a larger 'Idea Store' designed by David Adjaye, a place for lifelong learning with computers and rooms for community use.

The Tower Hamlets London Borough Council transferred ownership of the shopping arcades along with the rest of the Lansbury Estate to Poplar HARCA, a locally based housing association, in 2006. This association commissioned architects to draw up a master plan for the market.

As of 2015, the commercial properties are managed by Capital Properties (UK) Ltd, while the market stalls remain under the management of the London Borough of Tower Hamlets.

The market was the main focus point and filming location of E14: A Dying Trade, a short documentary filmed in 2011.

== Chrisp Street On Air ==
From November 2013 to April 2014, Chrisp Street Market was host to a project entitled 'Chrisp Street On Air' - a pilot exercise in rejuvenating London markets. The project, conceived by multidisciplinary design firm The Decorators, began with a radio station set up within the market and available online. The radio station invited locals to explore the market's history, character, and future. The radio component also informed a further programme of events in conjunction with local organisations, such as a boxing exhibition with the Lansbury Amateur Boxing Club. The project also incorporated new market furniture for eating, along with stalls to facilitate the events. Poplar HARCA, the owner of the market, used recommendations based on the project to apply to the Greater London Authority for a new round of funding.

== Dining ==
East End of London favourites such as pie and mash are available alongside Chinese and Indian food outlets. Chrisp St Market also hosts "Bite", a monthly street food market taking place on the last Friday of each month.

== Transport ==
=== Trains ===
The market is served by All Saints and Langdon Park DLR stations.

=== Buses ===
London Buses Routes 15, 108, 115, D6, 309, D8 and Night Route N15 serve the market.
