= Michael Green (artist) =

British painter and sculptor (1929–2022)

Michael John William Green (7 August 1929 – 1 October 2022) was a British painter and sculptor. He moved from an initial career in theatre to art in his mid-thirties, was an autodidactic as a painter but had from his very early years a natural talent in painting and drawing.

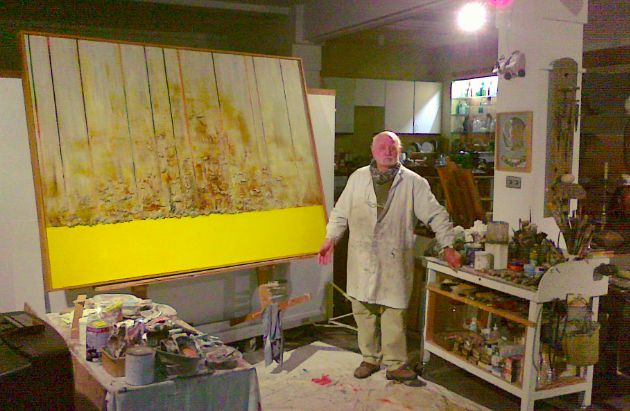
Michael Green with large textured oil on canvas from his Yellow Space Series.

== Life and career ==
=== Early life ===
Michael John William Green was born on 7 August 1929 in Nyasaland, East Africa (now Malawi), where he spent his first seven and a half years before coming to England for his Public School education. At the age of 15 he was awarded the Vicountess Northcliffe Scholarship at RADA (London) and initially worked in the theatre and moved to New York City when he was 23.

=== Career ===
After theatre work in Manhattan, he moved into product and decorative design work. Only at the age of 36 did he realize that he had made the wrong career choice at the age of 15. He then decided that he had to be a professional painter and quickly moved from representative painting to abstraction. He was Artist in Residence at the Indiana State University (1978), giving master classes on advanced painting and lectures on color theory. In 1986, he gave up his New York studio and moved back to London. He set up a studio in the old Spratt's Dog Biscuit factory, where he began his first sculptures.

=== Style ===
Green moved into abstraction soon after working figuratively, searching for a personal visual language and set up his first studio in SoHo while still only an avant-garde artist area. Established second studio in Northern Italy, thus preserving a 'European' ethos. His pre-occupation as an abstract painter for four decades has been with space. Not the astronaut's space but the space of the mind, an intellectual infinity. Lacking nature's spatial indicators (sky, perspective, horizon) idiomatic alternatives were needed. Thus his extensive earlier 'Bridge Series', oils and drawings - the metaphorical 'bridge' was his spatial ploy, creating the spatial tension that in reality is elemental to any actual bridge: space, structure and tension.

Green took up sculpture, concurrently with painting, on moving back to London in 1986, after a quarter century as a 'New York painter'. For him, space automatically is intrinsic to sculpture's dimensionality, so the ingredient of tension became prime: tensile linear balancing, contrasting textural disparities (shiny new, time-worn old), stressing the emotional stretch of a work.

The ongoing Painted Drawing Series comprises both large and small-scale works executed in oil on canvas and various media on paper. The series emphasizes expressive, gestural brushwork characterized as the "drawing of the brush" which is intended to foster a direct emotional connection between the viewer and the artist's creative process.

=== Personal life and death ===
Green lived in London and in Molini di Triora. He died on 1 October 2022, at the age of 93.

== Influences ==
His peers of influence ranged from John Sell Cotman to Richard Diebenkorn.

== Public collections ==
- British Museum Permanent Collection: Prints and Drawings (six works)
- Imperial War Museum Permanent Collection (conflict-related works)
- Indiana State University Permanent Collection

== Solo exhibitions ==
- 2007 Painted Drawing Series, The Great Hall, St Bartholomew's Hospital, Smithfield, London (more info)
- 2005 The Chain of Time, Rivington Gallery, London (more info)
- 2001 Michael Green - An Artists Career, Rivington Gallery, London (more info)
- 1995 The Bridge Series Drawings, a retrospective, Coombs Contemporary Gallery, London
- 1992 The Cyprus Works - large oils, collages, assemblage and sculpture, Morphi Gallery, Cyprus (Artist in Residence)
- 1985 Planned Space Paintings, Viafora Gallery, New York City
- 1982 Paintings from the Bridge Series, Hunnings Gallery, New York City
- 1980 The Bridge Series, Turman Gallery, Indiana State University

== Group exhibitions ==
- 2001 Summer and Autumn, gallery artists, Rivington Gallery, London
- 1998 Box Constructions (20 year survey), Megalomedia, London
- 1998 Bridge Series Drawings, Megalomedia, London
- 1998 Vital Art '98, Large sculptures and three-dimensional oils, Atlantis Gallery, London
- 1998 Built, Planned space oils, Cowcross Gallery, Artnet, London
- 1998 La Via dell'Oro Nero, Sculptures, Liguria, Italy
- 1997 Painted Drawings, Oil on paper, Coombs Contemporary, London
- 1996 Painted Drawings, Coombs Contemporary, London
- 1996 14 large three-dimensional oils, assemblages and sculpture, Cilntec, London
- 1996 Bridge Series Drawings, Austin Knight, London
- 1995 Endangered Wildlife, Lamont Gallery, London
- 1995 Festival Art Show, Henley, England and Co Gallery
- 1995 Large Sculptures, Raw Gallery, London
- 1994 Box (Box sculptures), Walsall Museum
- 1994 Summer Group Show, Raw Gallery, London
- 1994 Whitechapel Gallery Biennial, Open Studio Show
- 1993 Art in Boxes, 4th Annual Show, England and Co. Gallery, London
- 1993 The Collage Show, England and Co. Gallery, London
- 1993 Art in Boxes, Castle Museum, Nottingham
- 1992 Art in Boxes, 3rd Annual Show, England and Co., London
- 1990 Homage to the Square, Flaxman Gallery, London
