= All Saints DLR station =

Docklands Light Railway station

All Saints
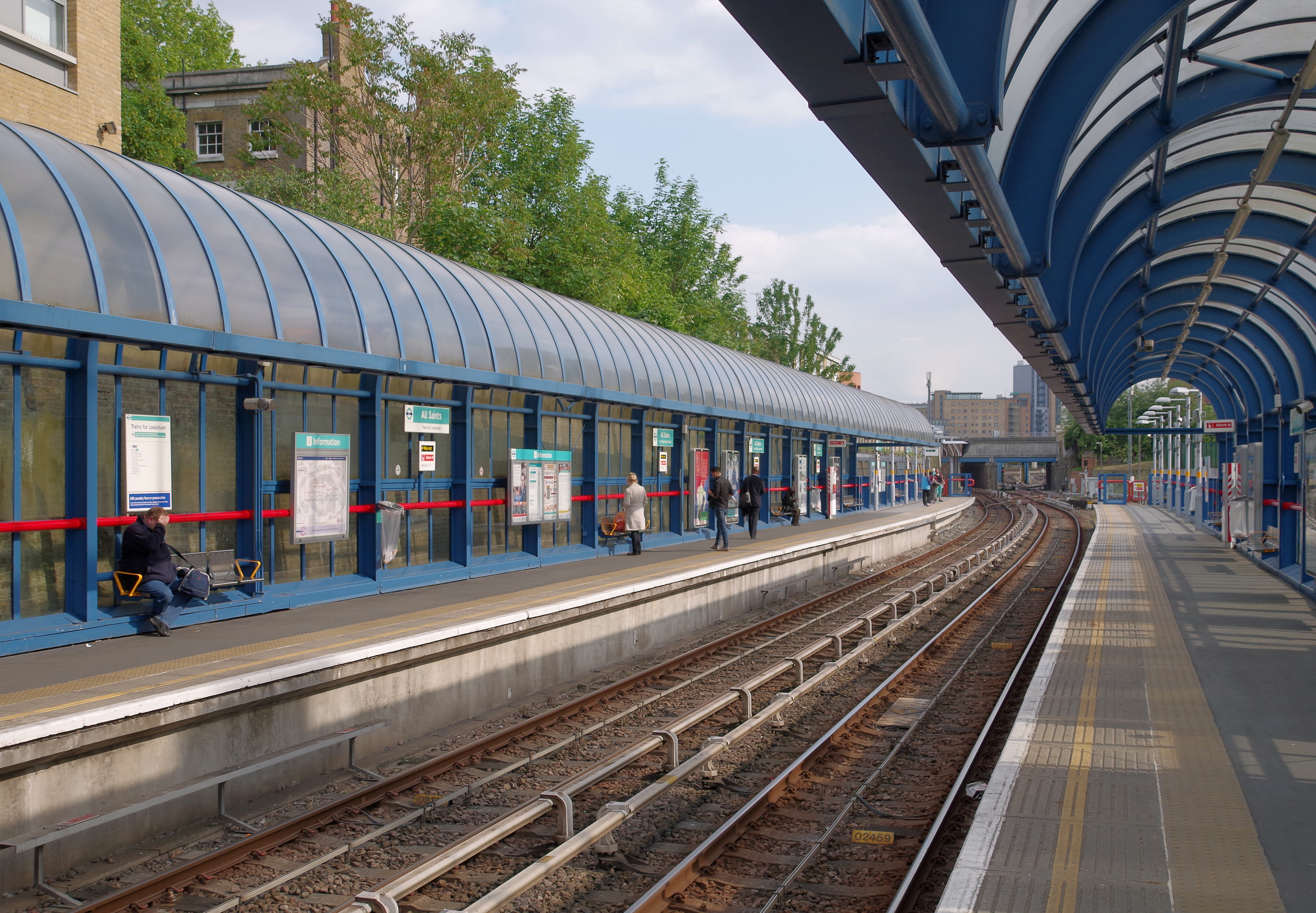
- Platforms looking south in 2014

General information
- Location: Poplar, Tower Hamlets
- Coordinates: 51.5108°N 0.0130°W
- Owner: Transport for London
- Manager: Docklands Light Railway
- Platforms: 2

Construction
- Structure type: At-grade
- Accessible: Yes

Other information
- Status: Unstaffed
- Fare zone: 2
- Website: Official website

History
- Opened: 31 August 1987

Passengers

DLR annual entry and exit
- 2021: ▼1.132 million
- 2022: ▲1.640 million
- 2023: ▲1.810 million
- 2024: ▼1.69 million
- 2025: ▼1.63 million
Location
- Location in Tower Hamlets

All Saints is a Docklands Light Railway (DLR) station in Poplar in East London. The station is named after nearby All Saints, a Church of England parish church dating from 1821 to 1823. The station entrance is on the East India Dock Road, the high street of Poplar and is opposite Chrisp Street Market while adjacent to the Poplar Baths, it also has two rail sidings directly west of the station forming part of Poplar DLR depot.

On-train announcements for trains approaching the station describe it as "All Saints for Chrisp Street Market".

== History ==
The first railway through the site of the station was the Bow–Poplar branch of the North London Railway (NLR), built in 1851 and opened on 1 January 1852. The line was opened initially for freight only. Poplar (East India Road) station was first served 1 August 1866. The line to Poplar was closed to passengers on 15 May 1944, during the Second World War. The line continued to be used for declining freight traffic until 5 October 1981 and the track lifted by 13 May 1985.

Serco announced that from 24 August 2009, the frequency on the Stratford to Lewisham branch would be reduced at peak times to one train every seven minutes, from the current five-minute frequency. This was to accommodate a flyover that increased frequencies by 30 seconds on the Bank to Lewisham line.

== Service ==
The typical off-peak service in trains per hour from All Saints is:

- 12 tph to Stratford
- 12 tph to Canary Wharf

Additional services call at the station during the peak hours, increasing the service to up to 16 tph in each direction, with up to 8 tph during the peak hours extended beyond Canary Wharf to and from Lewisham.

Preceding station	DLR	Following station
Poplar towards Lewisham	Docklands Light Railway	Langdon Park towards Stratford

== Nearby places of interest ==
- All Saints Church
- Balfron Tower
- Chrisp Street Market
- Poplar Recreation Ground Memorial
- Robin Hood Gardens

== Connections ==
London bus routes 15, 108, 115, D6, N15, N551 serve All Saints DLR station.
