= Poplar High Street =

Street in Poplar, London

Coordinates: 51°30′32.17″N 0°0′57.47″W

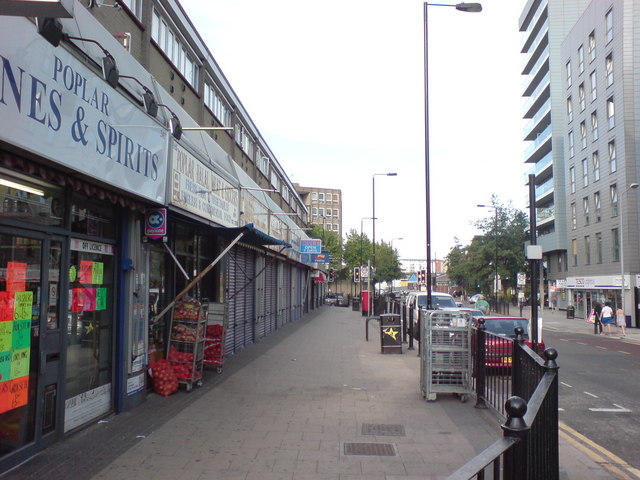
Poplar High Street, approaching Blackwall.

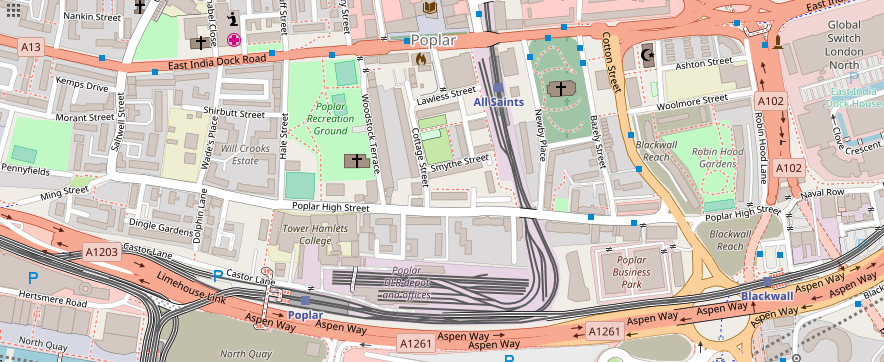
Poplar High Street as depicted on OpenStreetMap, 16 February 2018

Poplar High Street is a street in Poplar, located in the London Borough of Tower Hamlets. Although the street became less used after 1860, it had previously been the principal street in the Metropolitan Borough of Poplar.

== Notable buildings on Poplar High Street ==
- New City College - Tower Hamlets
- Poplar Hospital
- St Matthias Old Church
