= Langdon Park DLR station =

Docklands Light Railway station

Langdon Park
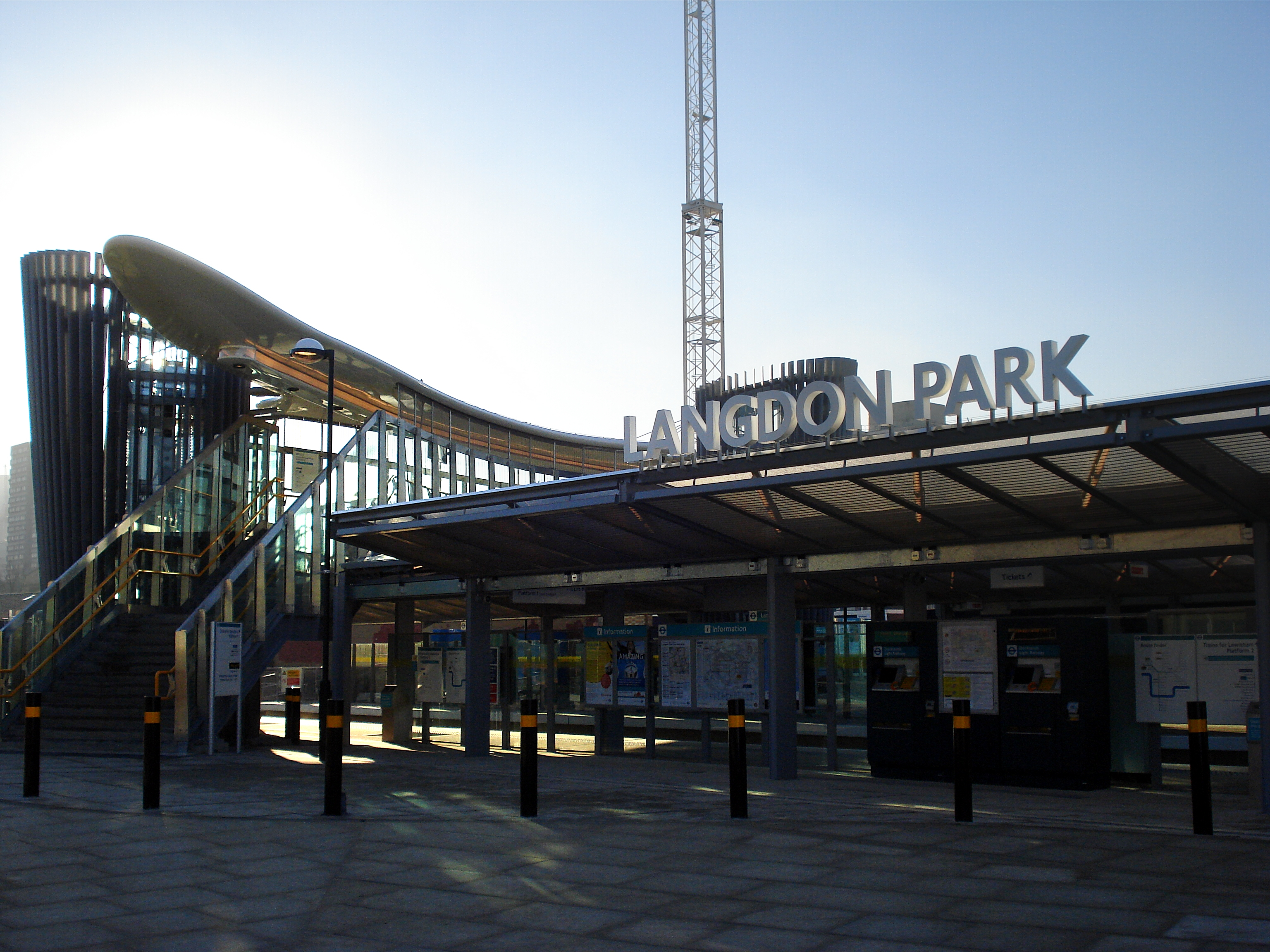
- Station entrance

General information
- Location: Poplar, Tower Hamlets
- Coordinates: 51.515173°N 0.014119°W
- Owned by: Transport for London
- Managed by: Docklands Light Railway
- Platforms: 2

Construction
- Structure type: At-grade
- Accessible: Yes

Other information
- Status: Unstaffed
- Fare zone: 2
- Website: Official website

History
- Opened: 9 December 2007

Passengers

DLR annual entry and exit
- 2021: ▲2.769 million
- 2022: ▲3.860 million
- 2023: ▲4.120 million
- 2024: ▼3.93 million
- 2025: ▼3.37 million
Location
- Location in Tower Hamlets

Langdon Park is a Docklands Light Railway (DLR) station in Poplar in London, England. The station is between All Saints and Devons Road stations on the Stratford-Lewisham Line. Construction of the infill station began on 17 November 2006, and the first day of operation was 9 December 2007.

== History ==
=== North London Railway ===
The first railway through the site of the station was the Hackney–Poplar branch of the North London Railway (NLR), built in 1851 and opened on 1 January 1852. The line was opened initially for freight only. Passenger service through the site commenced on 1 August 1866. The nearest stations on the line were Bow (Note: Bow was first served 26 September 1850 and last served 15 May 1944.) to the north and Poplar (East India Road) (Note: Poplar (East India Road) was first served 1 August 1866 and last served 15 May 1944.) to the south. An infill station at South Bromley opened on 1 September 1884. The line to Poplar was closed to passengers on 15 May 1944, during the Second World War. The line continued to be used for declining freight traffic until 5 October 1981 and the track lifted by 13 May 1985.

=== Docklands Light Railway ===
When planning the Stratford branch of the Docklands Light Railway, two station sites were safeguarded to be used much later when the system was developed. One of these stations was Pudding Mill Lane, which opened in 1996. The other station, to the south of the former South Bromley station site, was provisionally called Carmen Street. This was changed to Langdon Park, following the name of the adjacent park and Langdon Park School.

Proposals for design of Langdon Park were first drawn up in 2000 but due to lack of funding, amongst other things, the scheme was dropped. In May 2000, Leaside Regeneration Limited and Docklands Light Railway Limited (DLRL) jointly funded preliminary feasibility work looking at locations, outline costs and Docklands Light Railway implications of a new station between the existing All Saints and Devons Road DLR stations, which had one of the longest gaps in the DLR network. The research indicated that the best and most practical location would be at the pedestrian bridge linking Carmen Street on Lansbury Estate and Bright Street adjacent to Langdon Park itself.

In June 2005, DLRL re-engaged consultants to reassess the scheme costs and design with a view to developing the project for a planning application submission. Following the successful outcome of a bid for funding from the Office of the Deputy Prime Minister (ODPM), the predecessor department of Communities and Local Government, planning permission was applied for and subsequently granted. Construction took just over a year and cost £10.5 million. Then-Mayor of London Ken Livingstone presided over the station opening ceremony on 10 December 2007, although the station actually came into public use the day before.

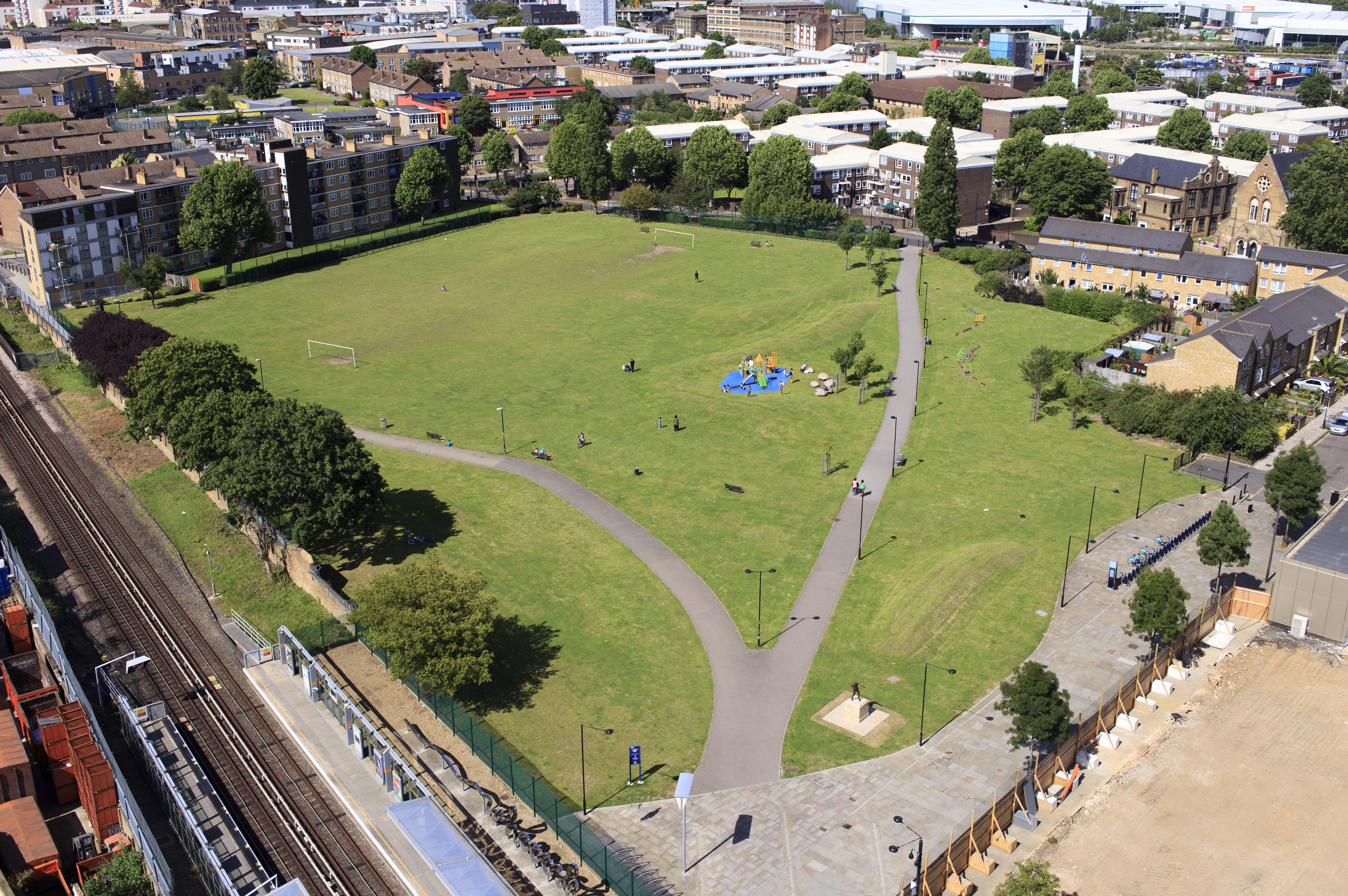
Langdon Park, from which the station gets its name

== Design ==
The station has 90 m (300 ft) platforms connected by a lightweight transparent replacement bridge link from Carmen Street and Hay Currie Street that were all pre-fabricated off-site and lifted into position over two weekends to reduce service disruption.

The station is fully accessible from street level and the bridge has two lift shafts at either end to provide access to the station.

The station was designed by Consarc Architects.

The station features three art installations by British artist Kate Davis. These include Whoosh, a large word sculpture clearly visible from either platform.

== Services ==
The typical off-peak service in trains per hour from Langdon Park is:

- 12 tph to Stratford
- 12 tph to Canary Wharf

Additional services call at the station during the peak hours, increasing the service to up to 16 tph in each direction, with up to 8 tph during the peak hours extended beyond Canary Wharf to and from Lewisham.

== Connections ==
The station is directly served by London Buses routes 108 and indirectly by the 309. Additionally the 108 has a 24-hour service.

== Notes ==
Preceding station	DLR	Following station
All Saints towards Lewisham	Docklands Light Railway	Devons Road towards Stratford
