= Bow Church DLR station =

Docklands Light Railway station

Bow Church
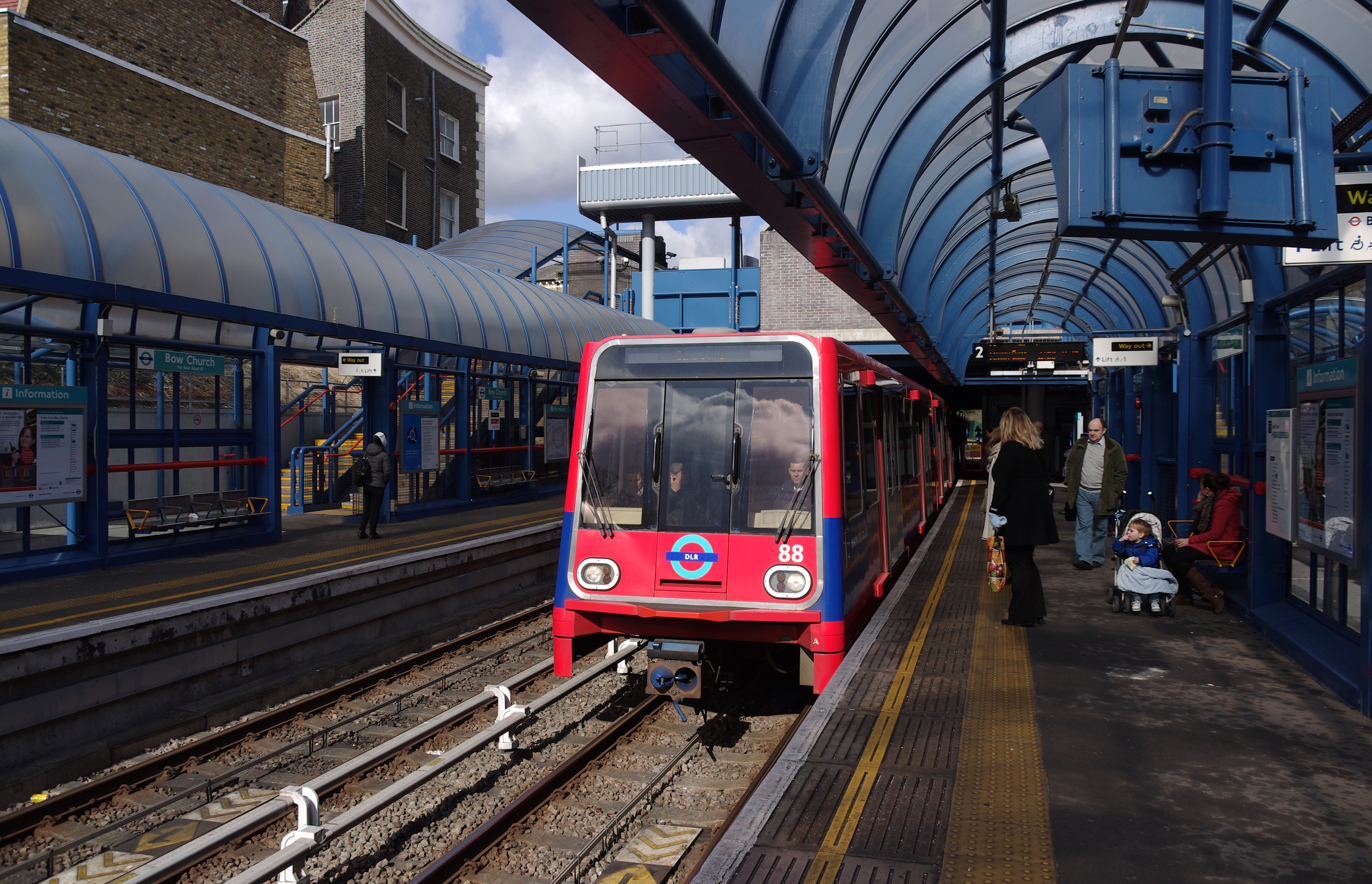
- Train for Canary Wharf at the platform in 2013

General information
- Location: Bow, Tower Hamlets
- Coordinates: 51.5275°N 0.0208°W
- Owner: Transport for London
- Manager: Docklands Light Railway
- Platforms: 2
- Connections: Out-of-station interchanges: Bow Road

Construction
- Structure type: At-grade
- Accessible: Yes

Other information
- Status: Unstaffed
- Fare zone: 2
- Website: Official website

History
- Opened: 31 August 1987

Passengers

DLR annual entry and exit
- 2021: ▼1.656 million
- 2022: ▲2.640 million
- 2023: ▲3.050 million
- 2024: ▼3.05 million
- 2025: ▼2.79 million
Location
- Location in Tower Hamlets

Bow Church is a Docklands Light Railway (DLR) station in Bow, London, England. It is between Devons Road and Pudding Mill Lane stations.

== History ==
=== North London Railway ===
The first railway through the site of the station was the Bow–Poplar branch of the North London Railway (NLR), built in 1851 and opened on 1 January 1852. The line was opened initially for freight only. Passenger service through the site commenced on 1 August 1866. The nearest stations on the line were Bow (Note: Bow was first served 26 September 1850 and last served 15 May 1944.) to the north and Poplar (East India Road) (Note: Poplar (East India Road) was first served 1 August 1866 and last served 15 May 1944.) to the south. An infill station at South Bromley opened to the south on 1 September 1884. The line to Poplar was closed to passengers on 15 May 1944, during the Second World War. The line continued to be used for declining freight traffic until 5 October 1981 and the track lifted by 13 May 1985.

=== Docklands Light Railway ===
In the 1980s, consideration was being given to improving transport in the London Docklands. Various schemes were proposed, with the final Docklands Light Railway plans mostly reusing old railway routes, including the former NLR branch to Poplar. The Stratford–Poplar service was the second line to receive legislative consent in April 1985, one year after the first Tower Gateway–Island Gardens route. In the Bow area stations were planned on the old NLR alignment at Bow Church and Devons Road. The DLR station opened on 31 August 1987 as one of the original stations of the service.

== Design ==
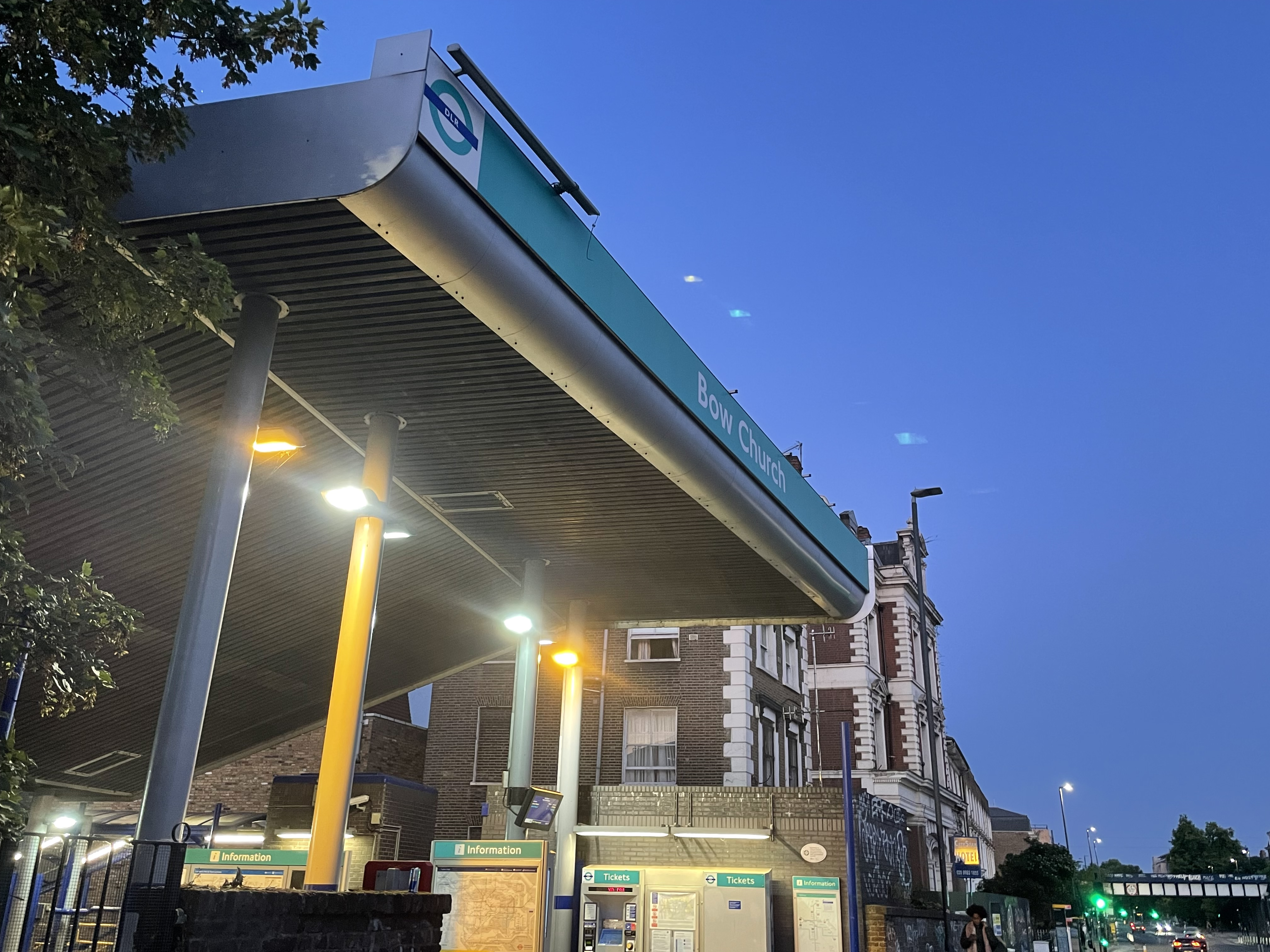
Bow Church DLR station entrance

There is a crossover south of the station which allows trains from Stratford and Poplar to reverse here. One example of this is when the new platforms at Stratford were being constructed – trains were suspended between Bow Church and Stratford and trains from Poplar terminated here. The station is accessible via lifts to both platforms and it has ticket machines and Oyster pads.

== Location ==
The station takes its name from the nearby 14th century Bow Church, which is a Church of England church.

It is interlinked by an out of station interchange (OSI) within 300 m (980 ft) walking distance via Bow Road with Bow Road station on London Underground's District and Hammersmith and City lines. The two stations are classed as a single station for ticketing purposes as well as on tube maps but both managed separately.

London Buses routes 25, 108, 205, 425, N25 and N205 serve the station.

== Services ==
The typical off-peak service in trains per hour from Bow Church is:

- 12 tph to Stratford
- 12 tph to Canary Wharf

Additional services call at the station during the peak hours, increasing the service to up to 16 tph in each direction, with up to 8 tph during the peak hours extended beyond Canary Wharf to and from Lewisham.

== Notes ==
Preceding station	DLR	Following station
Devons Road towards Lewisham	Docklands Light Railway	Pudding Mill Lane towards Stratford
