= Bow railway station =

Disused railway station in England

Bow
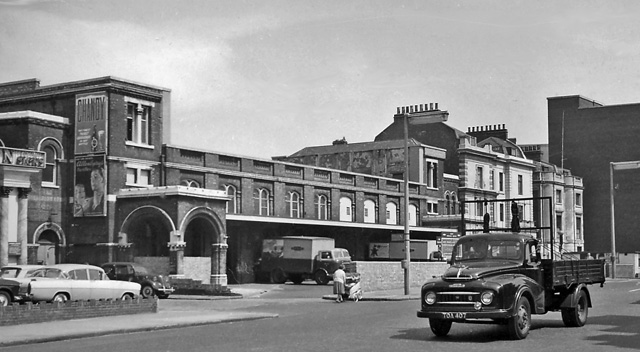
- Remains of the entrance in 1961
- Interactive map of Bow

General information
- Location: Bow
- Grid reference: TQ372830
- Number of platforms: 4

Railway companies
- Original company: East and West India Docks and Birmingham Junction Railway

Key dates
- 1850: Opened
- 1944: Closed

Other information
- Coordinates: 51.52833°N 0.02211°W

Bow was a railway station in Bow, east London, that was opened in 1850 by the East and West India Docks and Birmingham Junction Railway, which was later renamed the North London Railway (NLR). The station was situated between Old Ford and South Bromley, and was located on the north side of Bow Road, close to the second Bow Road station which was open from 1892 to 1949. A covered footway connected the two stations between 1892 and 1917.

The original Bow station was replaced by a much grander station in 1870, designed by Edwin Henry Horne, which incorporated a concert hall that was 100 feet (30 m) long and 40 feet (12 m) wide. Bow was served not only by the NLR but also by Great Eastern Railway (GER) trains to Fenchurch Street and a shuttle service to Plaistow.

The NLR line was severely damaged in the Blitz of World War II and the line east of Dalston Junction was closed in 1944 and never re-opened to passengers. The station buildings remained in use as a parcel office until it was closed in 1965. After being left derelict, Bow station was ultimately demolished during the construction of the Docklands Light Railway (DLR) which reused the old NLR line. Today, the station site is occupied by a car hire firm, and directly opposite lies Bow Church DLR station.

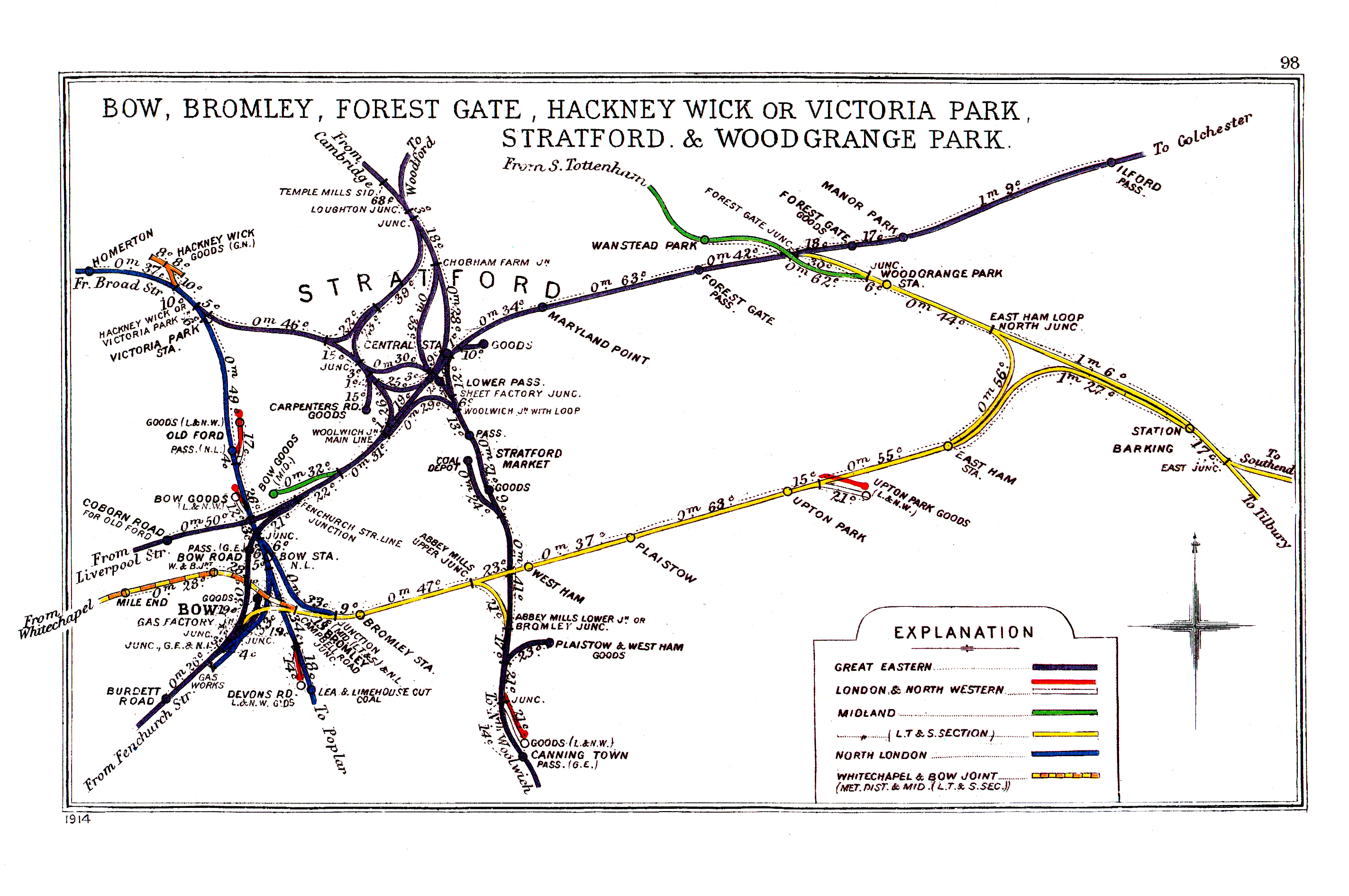
Railway Clearing House diagram – the station is shown as "Bow Sta. N.L." (lower left). Note the connecting lines south of the station and the nearby GER Bow Road station.

== Description (as at 1892) ==
By 1892 Bow station had four platforms and a direct walkway link to Bow Road GER station at the north end.

To the north of the station was a junction where the Bromley curve diverged from the main line and just north of that the GER line that linked Stratford and Fenchurch Street (known as the Blackwall London Extension Railway) crossed over the line. A short distance further north, the Great Eastern Main Line crossed over the NLR line and north of that was a goods yard. A signal box known as Tilbury Junction was located between the two railway overbridges controlling this junction.

The four platforms were linked by a footbridge connected to the walkway link at the north end of the station. The station building was located on the north side of Bow Road and straddled all four platforms. In 1892 the station which had been rebuilt in 1867 was an imposing building. The ground floor, which, was designed by architect Edwin Henry Horne and it was not until 26 March 1870 that the building was completed.

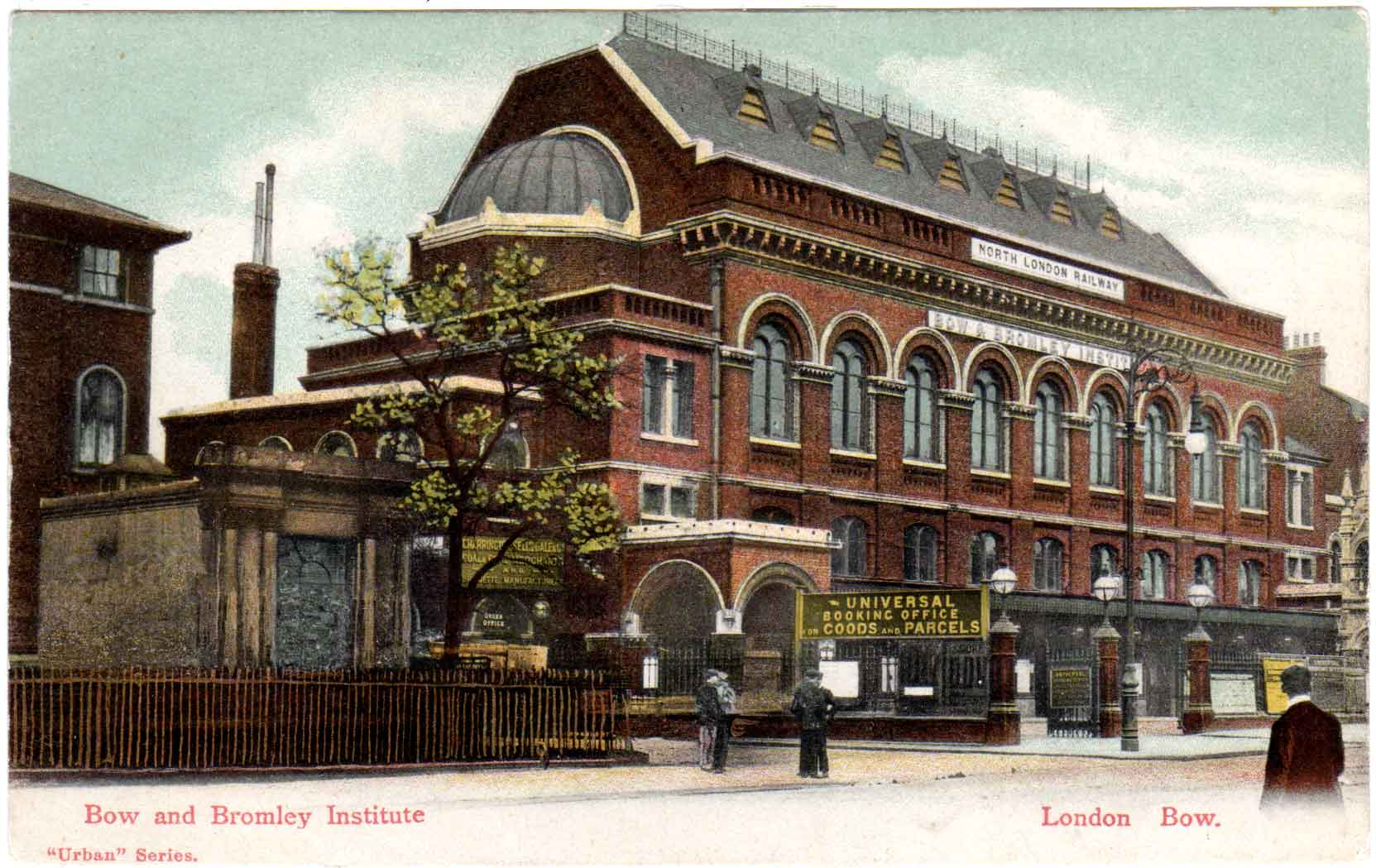
Bow and Bromley Institute c. 1907

The elegant facade featured simple round arches. At road level was a booking hall, waiting and refreshment rooms and on the upper floor was a spacious concert hall designed to seat 1,000 people.

On 2 September 1870 The Engineer published detailed illustrations of Bow station, naming Horne and including sectional drawings of the building as well as the frontage, concluding that "the building, is, in our opinion, as good an example of what a railway station should be as any we have ever seen".

The picture shows the structure photographed from the western side. The large windows above the house the Bromley Institute and the protruding dome like structure beneath the roof line housed the organ which was installed in 1874. Entrance to the institute was from the porch and an identical one existed at the other end of the building. An ornate fountain was installed in 1872 to commemorate the local firm Bryant and May who had led a campaign to defeat the match tax proposed by then Chancellor of the Exchequer, Robert Lowe. The fountain was designed by Rowland Plumbe.

To the immediate south of the station there was a junction east towards Fenchurch Street which joined the Blackwall London Extension Railway at Gas Factory Junction. This was a steeply graded line and heavy trains required banking assistance (a second locomotive at the rear) from Bow to get up the gradient in the early days of operation. Bow Junction signal box was located here.

To the west and south of the station Bow railway works was located and the pedestrian access for this was directly opposite the station on the opposite side of Bow Road.

== History ==
=== Pre grouping (1850-1922) ===
The East and West India Docks and Birmingham Junction Railway (later North London Railway (NLR)) was incorporated by the East and West India Docks and Birmingham Junction Railway Act 1846 (9 & 10 Vict. c. cccxcvi) on 26 August 1846. It was empowered to construct a railway from the district of Poplar and the docks to Camden Town in north London. The railway's headquarters and locomotive works were initially in Bow.

When the station was built it was a two platformed affair and the entrance was on the road bridge straddling the two tracks. Stairs lead from this building down to the platforms. Directly south of the station a junction diverged to the west that enabled North London Railway services to reach Fenchurch Street station via the London & Blackwall Extension Railway at Gas Factory Junction. Services between Islington and Fenchurch Street started operating on 26 September 1850 but the line to Poplar docks was not opened (to goods traffic until 1 January 1852.

Fenchurch Street acted as the NLR London terminus up until 1865 when Broad Street station was opened. The line that went straight on was to initially goods only, although a railway station had been constructed just south of the later Poplar East India Road railway station, it never saw traffic.

The opening of Broad Street and Poplar East India Road resulted in a change to the services that served Bow. The four trains per hour Fenchurch Street service was diverted to Poplar East India Road and the NLR then ran a connecting shuttle (also four trains per hour) into Fenchurch Street although after four years the operation of this was taken over by the Great Eastern Railway (GER).

The station was comprehensively rebuilt when the curve to the London Tilbury & Southend Railway (LTSR) at Bromley was being built in the late 1860s. The railway works had expanded in a short time and there was not enough space south of the works site to fit in a spur that ran up to the LT&SR (it crossed the NLR a short distance south of the works) so the spur diverged north of Bow station and along the east side of the works site. Bow station was a busy station at that time so the decision was made to rebuild the station.

Two new platforms were provided on the new curve which opened on 17 May 1869. Initially a service from Chalk Farm railway station to Plaistow which ran eight times per day. This did not prove particularly popular and a shuttle service linking Bow to Plaistow was operated and a run round loop was provided north of Bow station so the locomotive could change ends. Through trains from the NLR calling at Bow ran to Thameshaven (for connecting Margate steamer), Chalk Farm to Southend (1869-1886) and an LT&SR operated Chalk Farm to Southend service ran between 1907 and 1914 using an LT&SR locomotive and NLR coaching stock. These were daily services and additional excursion trains used the platforms throughout this period.

In 1870 some services of the Poplar East India Road service were extended to Blackwall (GER) station to connect with the Thames steamers serving that location. That service was in decline at this point and on 1 July 1890 all NLR trains were cut back to (Poplar East India Road). The GER was losing money on the lightly used Fenchurch Street to Bow shuttle service and proposed building a new station north of their Bow Road with a walkway connection between the two stations thus maintaining the connection without the need to run the shuttle service.

This was agreed and the re-sited Bow Road station and walkway to the Broad Street platform opened on 4 April 1892 with a footbridge being provided at Bow station at the north end of the station to link this to the Poplar and Bromley Curve platforms. The withdrawal of the GER shuttle must have also simplified operations in the area which had four Broad Street services and frequent goods trains to and from the docks.

The London & North Western Railway (LNWR) took over the working of the North London Railway under a common management arrangement on 1 February 1909 although the North London Railway continued to exist until 1922.

During World War I the Plaistow shuttle was withdrawn from service as a wartime economy measure on 1 July 1916 and thereafter the platforms were only used for excursion travel until the 1920s. The walkway connection was closed in 1917 and the footbridge at the north end of the station demolished at an unknown date soon after.

=== London, Midland and Scottish Railway (1923-1944) ===
Following the Railways Act 1921, also known as the grouping act, operation of the station fell under the control of the London Midland & Scottish Railway.

Planned prior to grouping the LMS operating an up and down morning and down evening peak hour services from 1 January 1923 using the Bromley to Bow curve. The service's carriages were stabled at Devons Road between the peaks and the locomotive probably returned to Plaistow LT&S engine shed.

By 1927 there were three trains per day from the LTS line to Broad Street with one starting at Thorpe Bay, one at Southend and one at Tilbury. The Thorpe Bay service also stopped at Bow. Significant improvements to the peak hour LTS line timetable (following rebuilding and re-signalling) in February 1935 saw the service discontinued from April 1935.

During World War 2 the station was hit by bombs on 20 March 1941. Sunday services to Poplar were withdrawn on 29 January 1940. Frequent bomb damage to the line saw the passenger service withdrawn on 15 May 1944 although a replacement bus operated through to 23 April 1945.

The railway itself did not close completely and remained open to goods but this declined through the following decades.

=== Since closure ===
The original route was restored to goods use after the withdrawal of the passenger services and continued to serve the London Docks although that traffic started to decline whilst the spur to Bromley continued to be used by freight routed to the LTS line.

The fountain was removed in 1953.

The Bow Institute, by this time known as the Emerald Ballroom, suffered a fire on 15 October 1956 and the grandiose upper storeys were demolished soon after.

The Bow to Bromley curve closed on 13 May 1959 as a result of changes being made to the LTS Line. Just west of Bromley station the curve joined that line which consisted of two sets of lines at this point. Goods trains crossed the local lines which was almost exclusively used by District line services. The LTS modernisation plan included the separation of the District Line from the British Railways operation. Another part of the modernisation saw the closure of the goods exchange sidings at Plaistow and the opening of a new marshalling yard at Ripple Lane with freights routed via Stratford or the Tottenham and Forest Gate route. In short the traffic finished.

During May 1964 the platforms and platform buildings were removed although the street level structure survived as it was in use as a parcels office until 1967. Part of the structure was demolished in the late 1960s with final demolition coming in November 1975. The line was still carrying goods traffic to London Docks but this fell off and closure to all rail traffic occurred on 3 October 1983 with the track being lifted during May 1984.

The goods only line (since 1892) that linked Bow to Gas Factory Junction was closed on 29 December 1967 as all the remaining goods yards it served had closed at this point.

After closure, the remains of the platforms were demolished and work started on building the Docklands Light Railway. A new station called Bow Church DLR station was constructed opposite the old station site on the south side of Bow Road. North of the Bow Road bridge the DLR line rises up to parallel the former London and Blackwell extension line before paralleling the Great Eastern Min line to Stratford. It is in this area the former station was located and little remains of that station although the 1892 walkway exists in part (c2018) and for a time this was a biscuit factory.

== See also ==
- Disused Stations site record
- Bow Junction and Bow Station layout

Preceding station	Disused railways	Following station
Burdett Road towards Fenchurch Street	London, Tilbury and Southend Railway	Old Ford towards Dalston
South Bromley towards Poplar	North London Railway (Poplar branch)	Old Ford towards Dalston
Bromley towards Plaistow	London, Tilbury and Southend Railway	Old Ford towards Dalston
