= South Bromley railway station =

Former railway station in England

South Bromley
- Interactive map of South Bromley

General information
- Location: Bromley-by-Bow
- Owner: North London Railway
- Number of platforms: 2

Key dates
- 1884: Opened
- 1944: Closed
- Replaced by: Langdon Park DLR

Other information
- Coordinates: 51.5169°N 0.0147°W

South Bromley railway station was a former railway station in Bromley-by-Bow, London, on the North London Railway between Bow and Poplar (East India Dock Road). It opened in 1884 but was closed in 1944 after bomb damage in the Blitz cut off the railway east of Dalston Junction.

== Description ==
The station was built on a constrained site and access was via a footbridge and the station building straddled the northbound line platform. The platform was a single island consisting of two faces with the eastern face for Poplar and, between 1870 and 1890, Blackwall. The western face was for services towards Bow and Broad Street. The bridge was extended and a westerly entrance to the footbridge opened. This entrance was literally a "hole in the wall" and was flanked by the premises of the Far Famed Cake Company (which became part of Lyons group).

The brick built station building was typical of the other stations on the line, but smaller and the architecture not as grand. It had a flat roof and the entrance was off the footbridge. The south facing side of the building had three windows and the building contained the ticket office, station masters office and there was a single wooden staircase down to the platform. Ticket collection took place in a covered wooden building at the bottom of the stairs and two wooden buildings were sited on the platform with cast iron columns supported an awning covering this area. Beneath the stairs was a porters room.

A signal box opened the same time as the station and was located north of the station between the two running lines.

== History ==
=== Pre grouping (1850-1922) ===
The East and West India Docks and Birmingham Junction Railway (from 1853 known as the North London Railway (NLR)) was incorporated by the East and West India Docks and Birmingham Junction Railway Act 1846 (9 & 10 Vict. c. cccxcvi) on 26 August 1846. It was empowered to construct a railway from the district of Poplar and the docks to Camden Town in north London. The railway's headquarters and locomotive works were initially in Bow.

Services started running on 26 September 1850 but South Bromley station was not built and the trains (initially from Islington) ran to Bow and then via Gas Factory Junction to Fenchurch Street as the NLR did not have a central London terminus. The line through the South Bromley site opened to goods traffic only on 1 January 1852. That changed in 1865 when the NLR opened Broad Street and constructed a new station at Poplar East India Dock Road. However, it was not until 1 September 1884 that South Bromley opened. By this time some NLR trains had been extended from Poplar to the Great Eastern Railway (GER) station at Blackwall giving connections to the Thames steamers.

In 1906 the London County Council erected a footbridge over the south end of the station (although there was no access to the station).

The London and North Western Railway (LNWR) took over the working of the North London Railway under a common management arrangement on 1 February 1909 although the North London Railway continued to exist until 1922.

1913 saw a fire damage part of the station and although this was initially attributed to local suffragettes the case was never proven..

=== London, Midland and Scottish Railway (1923-1944) ===
Following the Railways Act 1921, also known as the grouping act, operation of the station fell under the control of the London Midland & Scottish Railway.

Sunday services to Poplar were withdrawn on 29 January 1940.

Although the fact that bomb damage was responsible for the closure of Poplar East India Road on the line, there is no firm evidence that this was the case at South Bromley. Whilst rail historian H V Borley did state it was damaged and passengers had to be "led across the track by a flagman" as a result of damage to the station building, author J E Connor states there is no pictorial evidence to confirm this. Just to the south Poplar East India Road was badly damaged as were Bow and Old Ford and this all contributed to the decision to withdraw an increasingly unremunerative service.

The railway itself did not close completely and remained open to freight but this declined through the following decades.

=== Since closure ===
No firm date for the demolition of the station buildings but Connor suggests it was between March 1947 and July 1948.

The signal box lasted longer being closed on 25 September 1954. Matching the decline of the London Docks, freight traffic continued to decline through the 1950s, 1960s and 1970s. Closure of the line through the site to all rail traffic occurred on 3 October 1983 with the track being lifted during May 1984.

After closure, the remains of the platform was demolished and work started on building the Docklands Light Railway. Although no station was provided in the area initially, Langdon Park DLR station opened in 2007 was built just south of the South Bromley site. Nothing remains of the old station although the 1906 LCC footbridge existed until 1972 when it was replaced.

Preceding station	Disused railways	Following station
Bow	North London Railway (Poplar branch)	Poplar
