= Poplar (East India Road) railway station =

Former railway station in England

Poplar (East India Road)
- Interactive map of Poplar (East India Road)

General information
- Location: Poplar
- Owner: North London Railway

Key dates
- 1 August 1866: Opened
- 1944: Closed
- Replaced by: All Saints DLR station

Other information
- Coordinates: 51.5110°N 0.0131°W

Poplar (East India Road) was a railway station located on the East India Dock Road in Poplar, London. It was opened in 1866 by the North London Railway. It was the southern passenger terminus of the NLR, although goods trains ran on to connect to the London and Blackwall Railway (LBR) for the East India Docks or to the LBR's Millwall Extension Railway for the West India Docks.

The station site is now (2021) occupied by All Saints DLR station whilst Poplar DLR station is to the south and west.

== Description ==
The station building was located in the Metropolitan Borough of Poplar on the south side of the East India Dock Road bridge over the railway and was a substantial brick building with some Portland Stone features designed by architect Thomas Matthews. There were four arched windows arranged either side of three arched doors. It had a flat roof.

Within the building was a parcels office and ticket office and after passing the ticket inspector the passenger had the choice of the going left for the terminating platform (although some services operated through to Blackwall between 1870 and 1890), or right for services via Bow to Broad Street. There were some goods sidings adjacent to the Broad Street (up direction) platform used for wagon storage. The stationmaster's office and lavatories were located on the up platform.

Two NLR carriage sidings were located south of the station and there was initially two signal boxes in the area although these were combined into a signal box named Poplar Central on 9 September 1888. This was located south of the station on the up side of the line.

South of the station the line and the Poplar High Street bridge the line split with the easterly line diverging and rising up and over by means of a bridge the London and Blackwall Railway (LBR) route to the North London basin and sidings in the docks area. The LBR had refused an at-grade crossing on their already busy line but there was a further junction off this line (known as Poplar Junction) that was used to allow through running to Blackwall in 1870. The other route from Poplar went to Harrow Lane sidings where traffic could be routed to other docks on the Isle of Dogs.

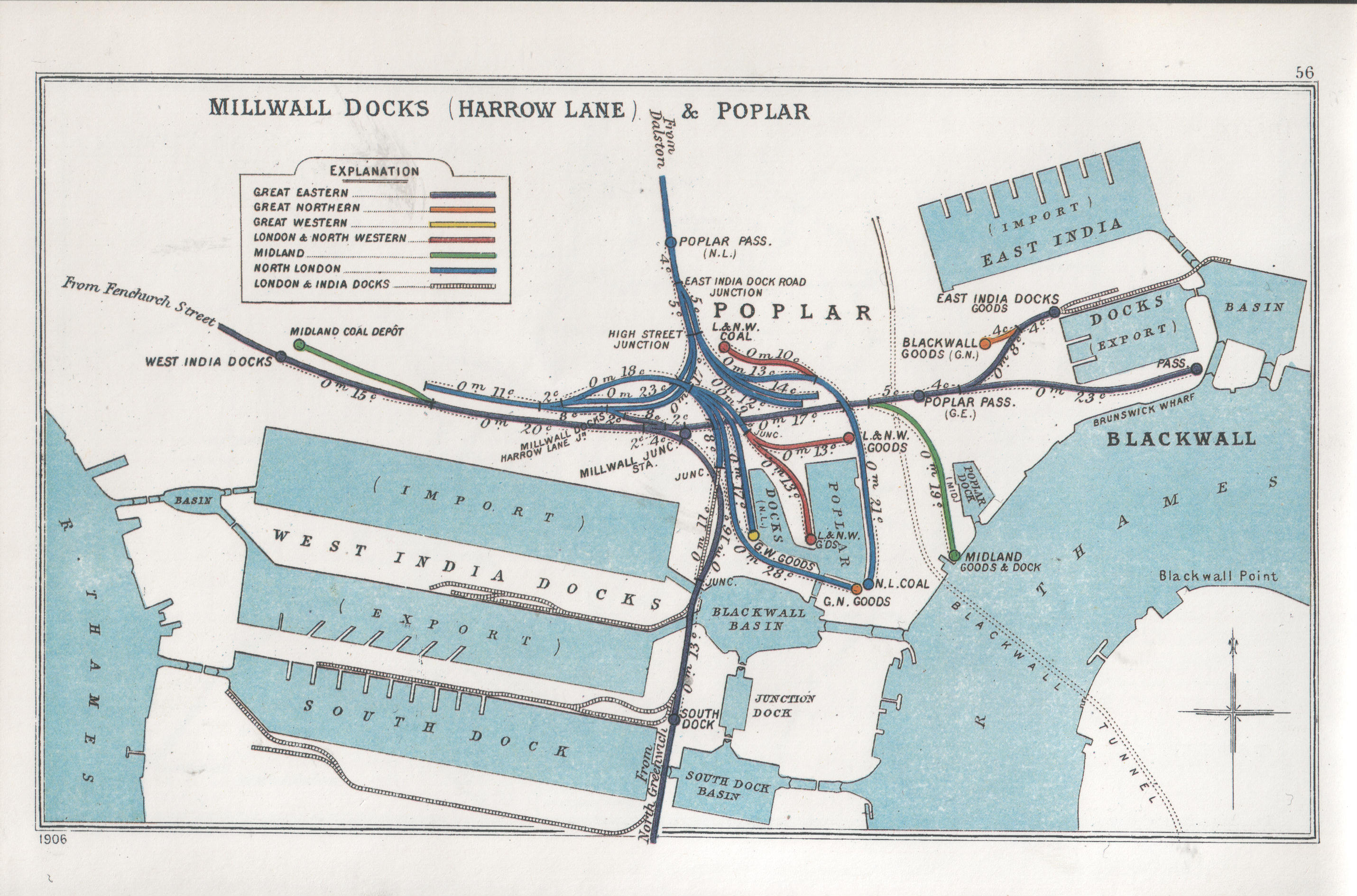
1906 Railway Clearing House diagram - the station is shown as Poplar NL. Note that Poplar Junction had been removed by the date of this map and the two carriage sidings are shown as the curved lines.

== History ==
=== Pre grouping (1850-1922) ===
The East and West India Docks and Birmingham Junction Railway (later North London Railway (NLR)) was incorporated by the East and West India Docks and Birmingham Junction Railway Act 1846 (9 & 10 Vict. c. cccxcvi) on 26 August 1846. It was empowered to construct a railway from the district of Poplar and the docks to Camden Town in north London. The railway's headquarters and locomotive works were initially in Bow.

Services started running on 26 September 1850 but Poplar (East India Road) station was not built and the trains (initially from Islington) ran to Bow and then via Gas Factory Junction to Fenchurch Street as the line did not have a central London terminus. The line through Poplar opened on 1 January 1852 to goods traffic only.

Although a station had been built (known as Poplar High Street) at the time and located south of the East India Road site it never had a passenger train service. It was not until 1865 that East India Road station was built and the station was named Poplar, but the LBR also had a station of the same name nearby on Brunswick Street, close to the northern entrance of the Blackwall Tunnel, so the new station was referred to as 'Poplar (East India Road)' to distinguish it. Services started operating to Broad Street which opened in the same year and the former Fenchurch Street service operated as a connecting shuttle service from Bow.

In 1870 NLR passenger services were able to access the London & Blackwall Railway's Blackwall railway station and a service started operating in 1870. Blackwall was connected by various Thames steamers to downstream locations. This service lasted until 1 July 1890 and Poplar Junction was removed and the remaining track work converted into a carriage siding for NLR services. The line through to the North London docks continued in operation after 1890.

In 1904 the road bridge carrying East India Dock Road was rebuilt in connection with the forthcoming electrification of the tram service. The new tram service had a negative effect on passenger numbers using the North London's Broad Street service which saw a decline through the following decades.

The London and North Western Railway (LNWR) took over the working of the North London Railway under a common management arrangement on 1 February 1909 although the North London Railway continued to exist until 1922.

=== London, Midland and Scottish Railway (1923-1944) ===
Following the Railways Act 1921, also known as the grouping act, operation of the station fall under the control of the London, Midland and Scottish Railway.

When the former LBR Poplar station closed in 1926 (then operated by the London & North Eastern Railway), the LMS station became known simply as 'Poplar'.

Sunday services to Poplar were withdrawn on 29 January 1940.

The station was badly damaged in the first London Blitz with bomb damage recorded on 20 March, 10 and 11 May 1940. It was however an attack on 29 January 1944 that saw the station buildings severely damaged and out of use although access to the platforms was still possible. Damage to other stations on the line saw the LMS decide to withdraw the service on 15 May 1944. A further attack in June 1944 saw the station further damaged beyond reasonable repair. Although replacement bus services operated for a period the station was officially closed on 23 April 1945.

=== After closure ===
The ruined buildings were demolished in March 1947 although the platforms and some low level remains of the station buildings remained hidden by advertising hoardings.

Despite the closure of the station the lines through the platforms were re-opened as they were a major route for goods trains running through to the docks. The docks saw a gradual decline in traffic and Poplar Central Signal Box officially closed on 2 December 1970 with all points being set for train crew operation. The inevitable followed some 13 years later and closure to all rail traffic occurred on 3 October 1983 with the track being lifted during May 1984.

After closure, work started on building the Docklands Light Railway and All Saints DLR station was built on the site. The few remains of the station were demolished around this time. The new station had services between Stratford and Island Gardens commencing on 31 August 1987. In 2021 a more frequent service operates between Stratford and Canary Wharf with some peak hour trains extended to and from Lewisham.

| Preceding station | Disused railways | Following station |
|---|---|---|
| South Bromley | North London Railway (Poplar branch) | Terminus |

Note - between 1870 and 1890 some trains worked through to Blackwall railway station.
