= Victoria Park railway station (England) =

Former railway station in England

Victoria Park
- Interactive map of Victoria Park

General information
- Location: Hackney Wick
- Owner: North London Railway
- Number of platforms: 3

Key dates
- 14 June 1856: Opened
- 8 November 1943: Closed

Other information
- Coordinates: 51.5438°N 0.0296°W

Victoria Park (opened as Victoria Park & Hackney Wick) was a railway station near Victoria Park, east London, that was on the North London Railway (NLR) which opened in September 1850 to Bow (where the trains turned east into the London and Blackwall Railway's Fenchurch Street station) and to the London Docks in January 1852.

A line linking the NLR line to the Eastern Counties Railway (ECR) at Stratford was built with a junction east of the first station site in 1854, and two years after that the first station opened with a station building in Wick Road. At the time the station was between Hackney and Bow on the north London Railway with other stations opening later,

The original station was replaced in March 1866 by a larger station at the junction itself to cope with increased passenger numbers and this station lasted until closure in 1943. The Wick Road buildings became two residential properties and these survived until 1958.

The second station building survived until 1970 when it was demolished to make way for a new road scheme and there are no remains today.

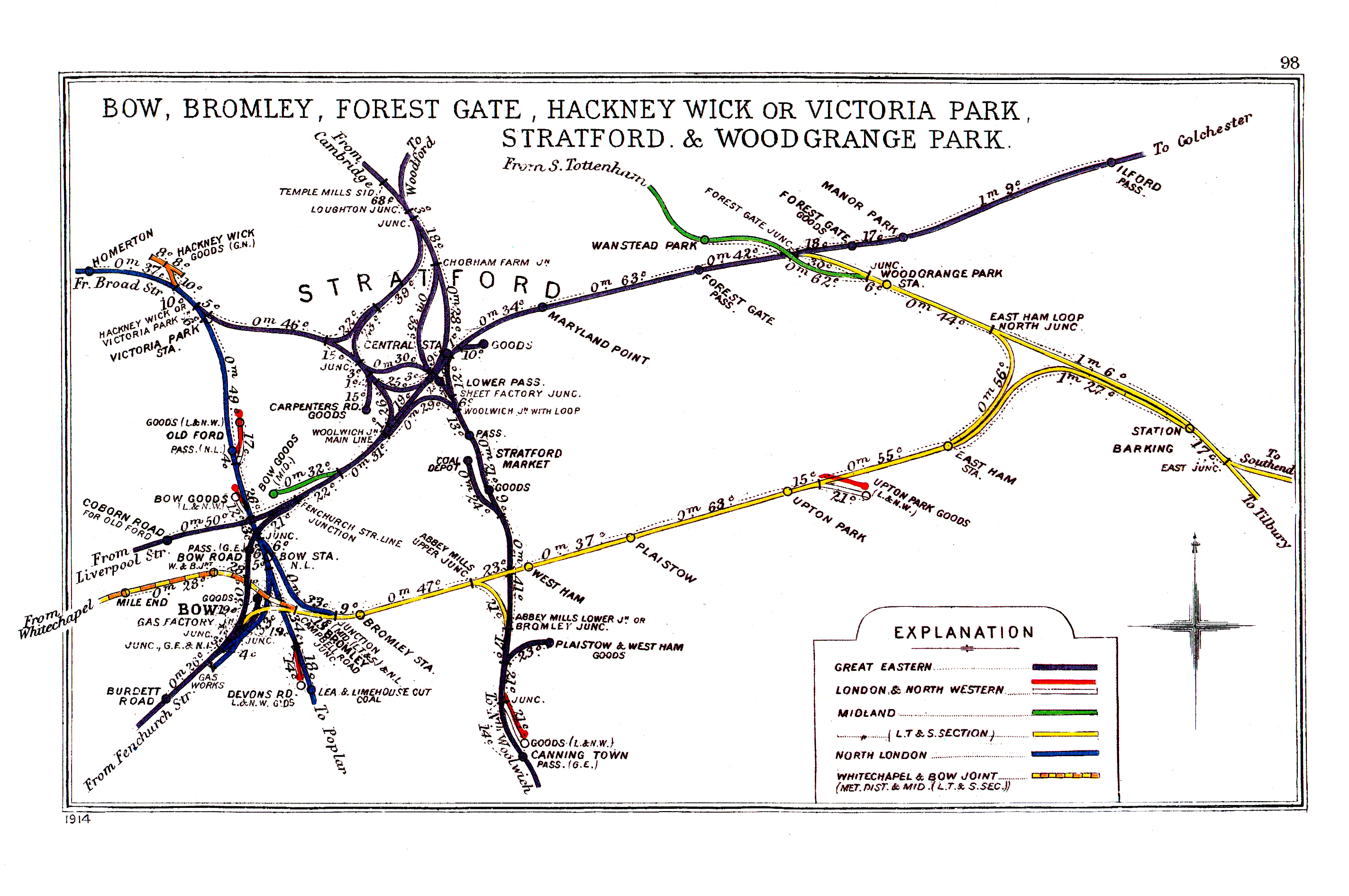
Railway Clearing House diagram showing the station top left

== Description ==
The first station was located west of the later junction with what is now the North London Line and consisted of a two-storey brick station building with two short platforms. It was of brick construction and was located in Wick Road.

The second station, which is shown on the attached map, was located at the new junction. Initially it had four platforms - two for the Poplar line and two for the Stratford line. The eastbound (towards Stratford) platform did not last for long once through trains had been withdrawn and the station spent most of its existence with three operational platforms.

The three storey station building was of brick construction. It was located on Cadogan Terrace between the two sets of lines and had a small forecourt behind railings. The railway was on an embankment at this location and the station building consisted of offices and stairs to track level. A subway linked the three platforms - the fourth being accessed by a board crossing across the tracks. A photograph from 1900 shows curtains in the top floor windows indicating this may have been a residence for the station master rather than offices.

A signal box was located north and adjacent to the junction. This was replaced by a signal box in 1961 on the site of the former platforms between the two sets of running lines.

== History ==
=== Pre-grouping (1850-1922) ===
The East and West India Docks and Birmingham Junction Railway (known as the North London Railway (NLR)) from 1853 was incorporated by the East and West India Docks and Birmingham Junction Railway Act 1846 (9 & 10 Vict. c. cccxcvi) on 26 August 1846. It was empowered to construct a railway from the district of Poplar and the docks to Camden Town in north London.

Passenger services started operating between Islington, Bow and Fenchurch Street station on 26 September 1850 with goods services to Poplar and the docks commencing on 1 January 1852.

The line between Victoria Park and Stratford was opened on 15 August 1854 by the Eastern Counties Railway (ECR) and the North London Railway began operating regular goods services early the following year. The passenger trains (towards Fenchurch Street/Stratford) had additional carriages which were detached at the junction and a second locomotive worked them through to Stratford. In the opposite direction the coaches were attached.

The first station was provided west of the junction with two platforms Although not quite complete the station opened temporarily to passengers on 29 May 1856 in conjunction with a special event celebrating the end of the Crimean War. Full opening was on 14 June 1856.

The North London Railway ran two return trains per day from Hampstead Road (later renamed Chalk Farm) via Victoria Park and Forest Gate Junctions to Tilbury which commenced on 1 July 1855 and finished 30 September. Congestion at Stratford made making these short lived services difficult and one was involved in an accident during this time at Stratford although a further attempt (as far as Barking) was made during September and October 1866

The practice of attaching and detaching carriages (now at the station) continued until a shuttle services was introduced from 1 January 1860.

This operational complexity as well as the growing popularity of Victoria Park, Hackney as a leisure destination saw a need to improve on the existing facilities and the second station situation south east of the original station (this is shown on the accompanying map) was opened 1 March 1866. Initially it had four platforms but the local used the westbound platform to terminate and originate and the east bound platform was used by the through trains to Barking. Once these ceased the platform, was rarely used and had been removed by 1895.

The ECR became part of the Great Eastern Railway (GER) in 1862.

A shuttle service operated from the eastbound platform to Stratford Bridge station from 1 September 1866 and was operated by the Great Eastern Railway (GER) and North London Railway in alternate years up until 31 October 1874.

After that operation was taken over by the GER and from 1 October 1895 services ran through to Canning Town and occasionally North Woolwich.

A footbridge linking the three platforms was opened on 24 February 1891 to support the existing subway. On 11 February 1899 a second entrance from Riseholme Street (to the Broad Street platform) was opened.

The London & North Western Railway (LNWR) took over the working of the North London Railway under a common management arrangement on 1 February 1909 although the North London Railway continued to exist until 1922.

During World War I the half hourly service was reduced to hourly and further cuts followed in 1921.

=== London Midland & Scottish Railway (1923-1943) ===
Following the Railways Act 1921, also known as the grouping act, operation of the station fell under the control of the London Midland & Scottish Railway. Trains formerly operated by the Great Eastern Railway were now operated by the London and North Eastern Railway (LNER).

LMS Sunday services to Poplar were withdrawn on 29 January 1940.

On 20 March 1941 the station suffered some minor bomb damage from a German air raid.

The LNER Sunday service to Canning Town was withdrawn on 31 March 1940 and withdrawal of the weekday service followed on 1 November 1942. With the interchange facility lost and declining passenger numbers the decision was taken to close Victoria Park station and closure took place on 8 November 1943.

=== After closure ===
The passenger service between Broad Street and Poplar (East India Road) was withdrawn due to bomb damage in May 1944 on the route during World War II and the fact that passenger numbers had been declining since the early part of the century. The line remained open to goods for the docks.

After closure the waiting room on the Broad Street platform became a base for the local Home Guard.

The footbridge was demolished in 1950.

The station building from the first station which had been used as a pair of residential properties was demolished in 1958.

The platforms were demolished at some point in the early 1960s but the former station building survived until 1970 when it was demolished as part of the construction of the East Cross Route (formerly the A102(M) but now the A12) with a new railway viaduct on the Poplar line crossing the new road constructed c.1972

The track to Stratford was put into revived passenger use from 14 May 1979 (marketed as the Crosstown Linkline) and Hackney Wick station opened a short distance to the east on 12 May 1980.

The Poplar line closed to all rail traffic on 3 October 1983 with the track being lifted during May 1984.

Services on the North London Line have gone from strength to strength since the re-opening of the "Cross London Link" with electrification and services running between Richmond and North Woolwich (1985-2006) and Clapham Junction or Richmond to Stratford (the 2021 service), The line sees heavy freight usage being the only electrified route between the major east coast Port of Felixstowe and the West Coast Main Line. Nothing remains of the station today except the bottom floor of the 1961 signal box which houses electrical equipment.

Preceding station	Disused railways	Following station
Homerton	North London Railway; Broad Street - Poplar (East India Road)	Old Ford
Terminus	Great Eastern Railway; Victoria Park to Canning Town/North Woolwich	Stratford
