= North London Railway =

Defunct English railway company

Overview
- Headquarters: Bow, London
- Locale: London, United Kingdom
- Dates of operation: 1850–1922
- Successor: London, Midland and Scottish Railway

Technical
- Track gauge: 4 ft 8 1/2 in (1,435 mm) standard gauge

The North London Railway (NLR) company had lines connecting the northern suburbs of London with the Port of London further east. The main east to west route is now part of London Overground's North London Line. Other NLR lines fell into disuse but were later revived as part of the Docklands Light Railway, and London Overground's East London Line. The company was originally called the East and West India Docks and Birmingham Junction Railway (E&WID&BJR) from its start in 1850, until 1853. In 1909, it entered into an agreement with the London and North Western Railway (LNWR) which introduced common management, and the NLR was taken over completely by the LNWR in 1922. The LNWR itself became part of the London, Midland and Scottish Railway (LMS) from the start of 1923. The railways were nationalised in 1948 and most LMS lines, including the North London route, then came under the control of the London Midland Region of British Railways.

== History ==
East and West India Docks and Birmingham Junction Railway Act 1846
- Act of Parliament
- Parliament of the United Kingdom
- Long title: An Act for making a Railway from the East and West India Docks to join the London and Birmingham Railway at the Camden Town Station, to be called "The East and West India Docks and Birmingham Junction Railway."
- Citation: 9 & 10 Vict. c. cccxcvi

Dates
- Royal assent: 26 August 1846

Text of statute as originally enacted

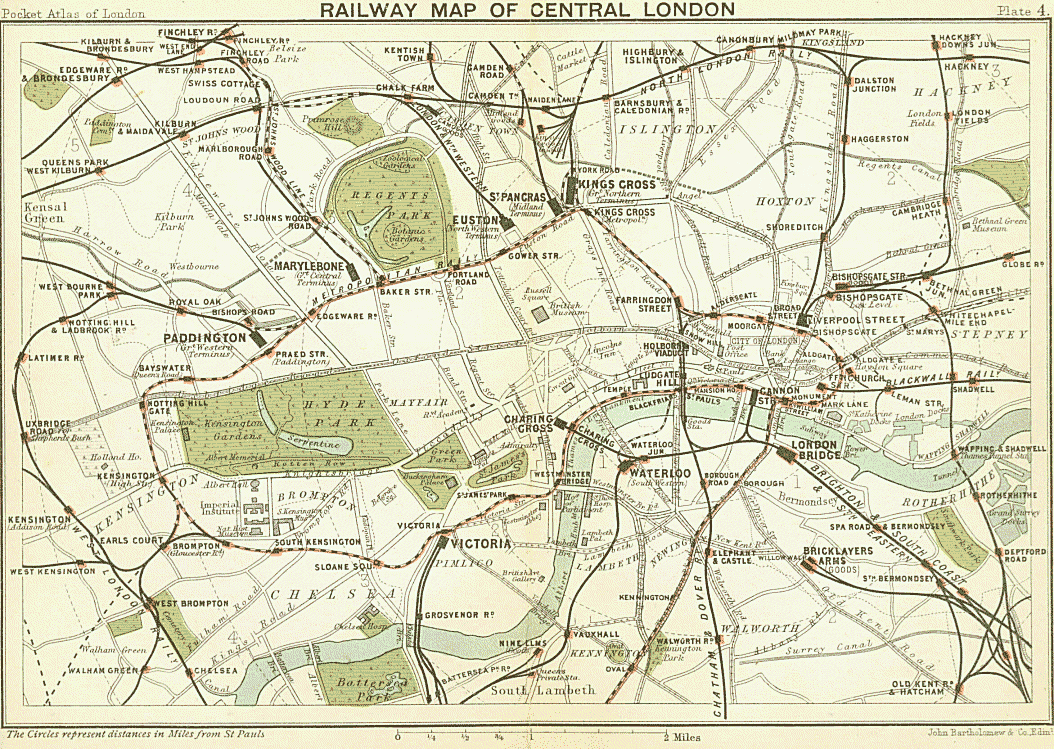
Railway map of London, 1899, from The Pocket Atlas and Guide to London

The East and West India Docks and Birmingham Junction Railway was incorporated by an act of Parliament, the East and West India Docks and Birmingham Junction Railway Act 1846 (9 & 10 Vict. c. cccxcvi), on 26 August 1846. It was empowered to construct a railway from the district of Poplar and the docks to Camden Town in north London. The railway's headquarters and locomotive works were initially in Bow.

North London Railway Act 1853
- Act of Parliament
- Parliament of the United Kingdom
- Long title: An Act to enable the East and West India Docks and Birmingham Junction Railway Company to raise additional Capital; and for other Purposes.
- Citation: 16 & 17 Vict. c. xcvii

Dates
- Royal assent: 8 July 1853

Text of statute as originally enacted

The North London Railway Act 1853 (16 & 17 Vict. c. xcvii) renamed the company to the North London Railway.

At first, it ran trains from Bow Junction on the London and Blackwall Railway (L&BR) to Islington, starting on 26 September 1850. The line was extended to Camden Town railway station from 7 December 1850 and to Hampstead Road station (later renamed Primrose Hill) from 9 June 1851. Another extension via the L&BR was opened on 1 January 1852, from Bow Junction to Poplar railway station, and from there to Blackwall and the East India Docks; a connection at Bow allowed trains to run to Fenchurch Street. This arrangement lasted until 1865, when an extension from Dalston Junction to Broad Street was opened; Broad Street became the main terminus, and the Poplar line became a branch. In the meantime, in 1864, a banker on a train from Fenchurch Street to Chalk Farm became the first victim of a murder on a British train.

In 1869, the line was extended along the North and South Western Junction Railway (a joint enterprise by the LNWR, Midland Railway and the NLR) from Willesden Junction to a London and South Western Railway branch to Richmond. A bypass line from Camden to Willesden Junction via Gospel Oak and West Hampstead opened in 1860. Meanwhile, at the eastern end, a spur line connecting the NLR to Stratford from Victoria Park opened in 1854 but was not used by passenger services. The line between Camden Town and Dalston Junction was quadrupled in 1871.

The LNWR took over the working of the railway under a common management arrangement on 1 February 1909. The company still existed until 1922, with its own board of directors and shareholders, when it was absorbed by the LNWR. The last board meeting and last shareholders meeting were both held on 23 November 1922, the latter giving the shareholders' approval of amalgamation. The board minutes were signed by A Holland-Hibbert, the chairman, who added "Goodbye!". Beneath this was typed, "This was the last Board Meeting of the North London Railway Company, the Undertaking being absorbed under “The London and North Western Railway (North London Railway and Dearne Valley Railway) Preliminary Absorption Scheme 1922” by the London and North Western Railway Company as from 1 January 1922."

The LNWR, which half-owned Broad Street station, was responsible for electrification of the Broad Street to Richmond and Kew Bridge lines in 1916.

== Legacy ==
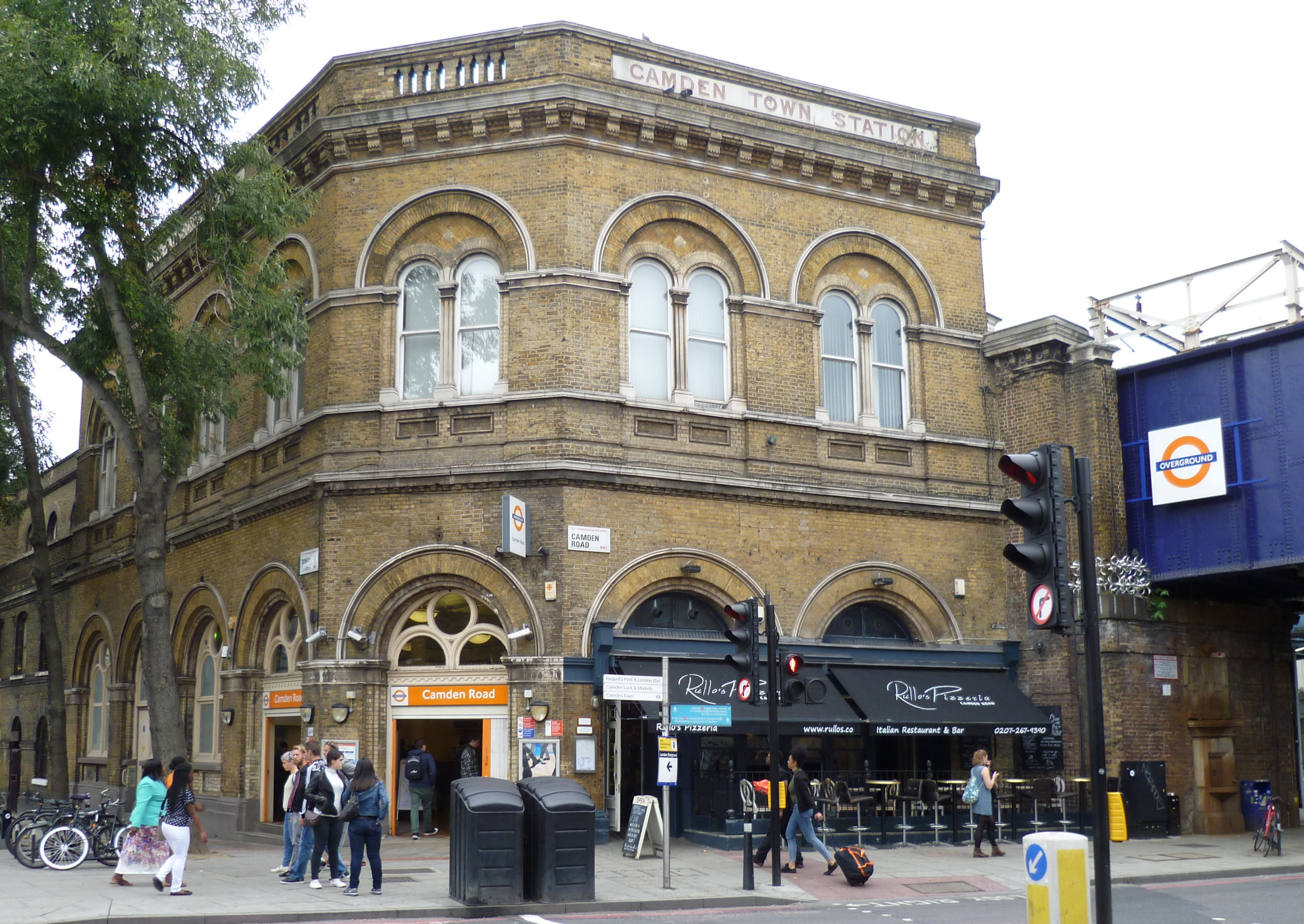
Camden Road station is one of the few remaining examples of the NLR's yellow-brick, "Venetian" architectural style. It was designed by Edwin Henry Horne.

The Kew Bridge service was withdrawn as a wartime economy measure in 1940, which proved to be permanent.

The line from Dalston Junction to Poplar was heavily damaged during the Blitz of World War II. Passenger services from Broad Street to Poplar via Victoria Park and Bow were suspended on 15 April 1944 and officially closed on 14 May 1944. A substitute bus service was provided until 23 April 1945 but the service was finally withdrawn at the end of the war. The northern section of the East Cross Route (A12) built in the late 1960s ran parallel to the rail line between Old Ford and Victoria Park stations, both of which were demolished for the road's construction.

The Crosstown Linkline service reinstated passenger service over the Dalston Junction to Victoria Park Junction section of the Poplar branch from 14 May 1979, running from Camden Town to Stratford and then over the former Eastern Counties and Thames Junction Railway to North Woolwich. The remaining freight line from Victoria Park Junction to Poplar Docks via Bow Junction closed on 3 October 1983. From 13 May 1985, the Camden to North Woolwich Crosstown Linkline was combined with the Richmond to Broad Street service and ceased to serve Dalston Junction and Broad Street, which finally closed on 30 June 1986.

The line between Willesden Junction and Camden via Primrose Hill is now primarily used (in 2014) for empty coaching stock movements between the North London Line and Willesden Depot, freight trains and, during engineering work, diverted passenger services to and from the Watford DC Line. Primrose Hill station has been closed.

Since 31 August 1987, Docklands Light Railway has followed the path of the North London Railway from Bow Church to Poplar.

The East London Line Extension took over the abandoned stretch between Dalston Junction and Shoreditch from April 2010, incorporating it into the London Overground network.

== Stock ==
Among the first locomotives bought by the railway from outside contractors were five 0-4-2ST engines. After that, all were constructed at Bow, London.

- List of locomotives
- LNWR electric units

== Workshop ==
Bow railway works was built in 1853 and had a sizeable wagon repair shop. When the railway was merged into the LMS it was the smallest of 15 workshops. It repaired NLR locomotives and from 1927 those from the former London, Tilbury and Southend Railway (LTSR).

In the 1930s, the works developed and manufactured the Hudd automatic control system for the LTSR, which led to a British Rail (BR) team from the national headquarters setting up in Bow to develop BR's standard Automatic Warning System. The workshop was badly damaged during the Blitz and the wagon workshop destroyed.

In 1956, the workshop repaired diesel-electric locomotives for the motive power depot at Devons Road (the first to become all-diesel). After a while it was receiving locos in the morning and turning them round by the evening, which initially confused the statistical returns since locos were entering and leaving the works on the same day. The works closed in 1960.

== Stations ==
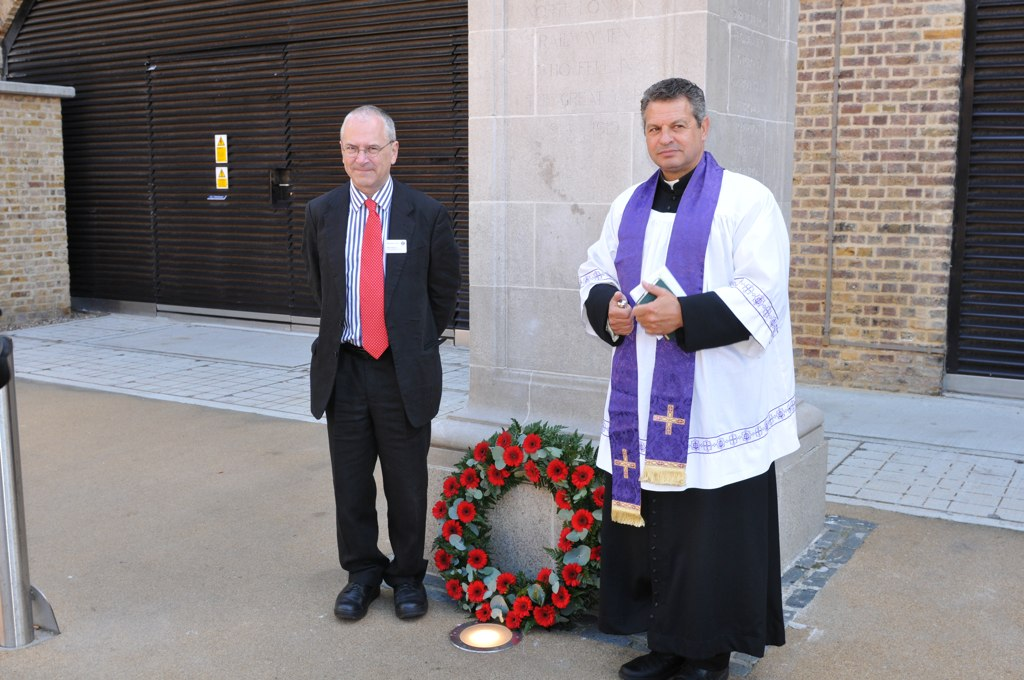
The NLR erected a First World War memorial to fallen staff at Broad Street. On that station's closure it was moved first to Richmond, then in 2011 to Hoxton.

Richmond to Willesden Junction (joined NLR 1856):

- Richmond (opened 1846)
- Kew Gardens (opened 1869)
- Gunnersbury (opened 1869)
- South Acton (opened 1880)
- Acton Central (opened 1853)
- Willesden Junction (opened 1866)

Willesden Junction to Camden via Primrose Hill (opened 1851–2, passenger services between South Hampstead and Camden withdrawn 1992):

- Kensal Green (opened 1916)
- Queen's Park (opened 1879)
- Kilburn High Road
- South Hampstead (Loudon Road until 1922)
- Primrose Hill (Hampstead Road until 1 December 1862, Chalk Farm until 25 September 1950; closed 1992)

Willesden Junction to Camden via West Hampstead & Gospel Oak (opened 1860):

- Kensal Rise
- Brondesbury Park
- Brondesbury
- West Hampstead
- Finchley Road & Frognal
- Hampstead Heath
- Gospel Oak
- Kentish Town West

Camden Road to Dalston (opened 1850):

- Camden Road (Camden Town until 25 September 1950)
- Maiden Lane (closed 1917)
- Caledonian Road & Barnsbury (formerly Barnsbury)
- Highbury & Islington
- Canonbury
- Mildmay Park (closed 1934)
- Dalston Kingsland (closed 1865, reopened 1983)

Dalston to Broad Street (opened 1865, closed 1986, mostly reopened 2010):

- Dalston Junction (closed 1986, reopened 2010)
- Haggerston (closed 1940 with the Poplar Branch, reopened 2010)
- Shoreditch (closed 1940 with the Poplar Branch)
- Broad Street

Dalston to Poplar (opened 1850, closed to passengers 1944, Dalston- Stratford reopened 1980):

- Hackney Central (formerly Hackney, reopened 1980)
- Homerton (reopened 1985)
- Victoria Park
- Old Ford
- Bow
  - Fenchurch Street (not served after opening of Broad Street link in 1865)
- South Bromley
- Poplar (East India Dock Road)

Bow to Plaistow (1869 to 1916):

- Bromley
- West Ham (served from 1901)
- Plaistow

At Poplar, the line connected to Millwall Junction, allowing goods trains to run to Blackwall and the East India Docks, or along the Millwall Extension Railway, which served the West India Docks.
