= Idea Store =

Chain of educational centres in Tower Hamlets, London

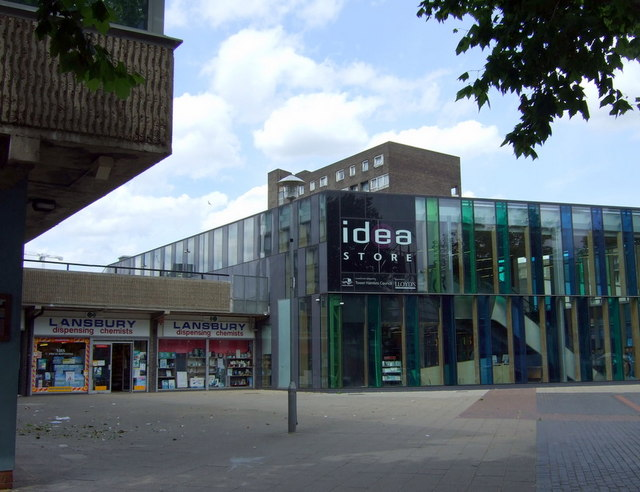
Exterior view of the Idea Store in Poplar, 2008

Idea Store is a chain of educational community centres in the London Borough of Tower Hamlets, England, that offer library services along with adult learning courses and extensive activities and events programmes. The project was initiated in 1999 by Tower Hamlets Council. The centres present public programmes such as dance classes, computer classes, libraries, and medical clinics. The spaces are usually located on blocks with high foot traffic.

Since the first branch opened in 2002 in Bow, several others have opened also in London: Chrisp Street (2004), Whitechapel (2005), Canary Wharf (2006), and Watney Market (2013). The group also publishes a local web directory.

== History ==
The original Idea Store Strategy was approved in 1999, with the aim of improving the performance of library and information services in the London Borough of Tower Hamlets, which CEO Judith St John described as having had the "worst library service in London". Idea Stores were designed to deliver "in a way that captured the best traditions of the library movement and education sector but present them in an exciting way – one that draws in new users and retains existing users".

Listening to consumer's needs in creating the Idea Store, St John reported that people had highlighted three key needs to be addressed:

1. “We want to go to places that are where we go in the normal course of our lives,”
2. “We want a place that makes us feel good about ourselves,”
3. “It needs to belong to us.”

St John has said that upon entering an Idea Store, a person should "feel that there are people in there who are interested in you, who have something to say, and that those people might be your neighbour."

Following a consultation exercise, significant service remodelling and capital investment led to the opening of the first Idea Store in May 2002 in Bow. A partnership approach was taken to service development and funding with the Learning & Skills Council and Tower Hamlets College making significant contributions to the strategy implementation.

== Services ==
As well as the traditional library service, Idea Stores offer a range of adult education classes, along with other career support, training, meeting areas, cafes and arts and leisure pursuits. These activities take place in accessible spaces modelled on retail environments, intended to allow informal social gathering. The venues also host community clubs.

== Locations ==
From 2002 with the store in Bow, there have been five Idea Stores open. The first one to open was Bow, then Chrisp Street in 2004, Whitechapel, Canary Wharf in 2006, and Watney Market in 2013.

Idea Store Whitechapel opened in September 2005 and is housed in a building designed by David Adjaye. It includes the former Whitechapel library which was once home to the largest collection of Yiddish books in Europe.
