= Bow, London =

Area of east London, England

Coordinates: 51.5298°N 0.0288°W

Bow
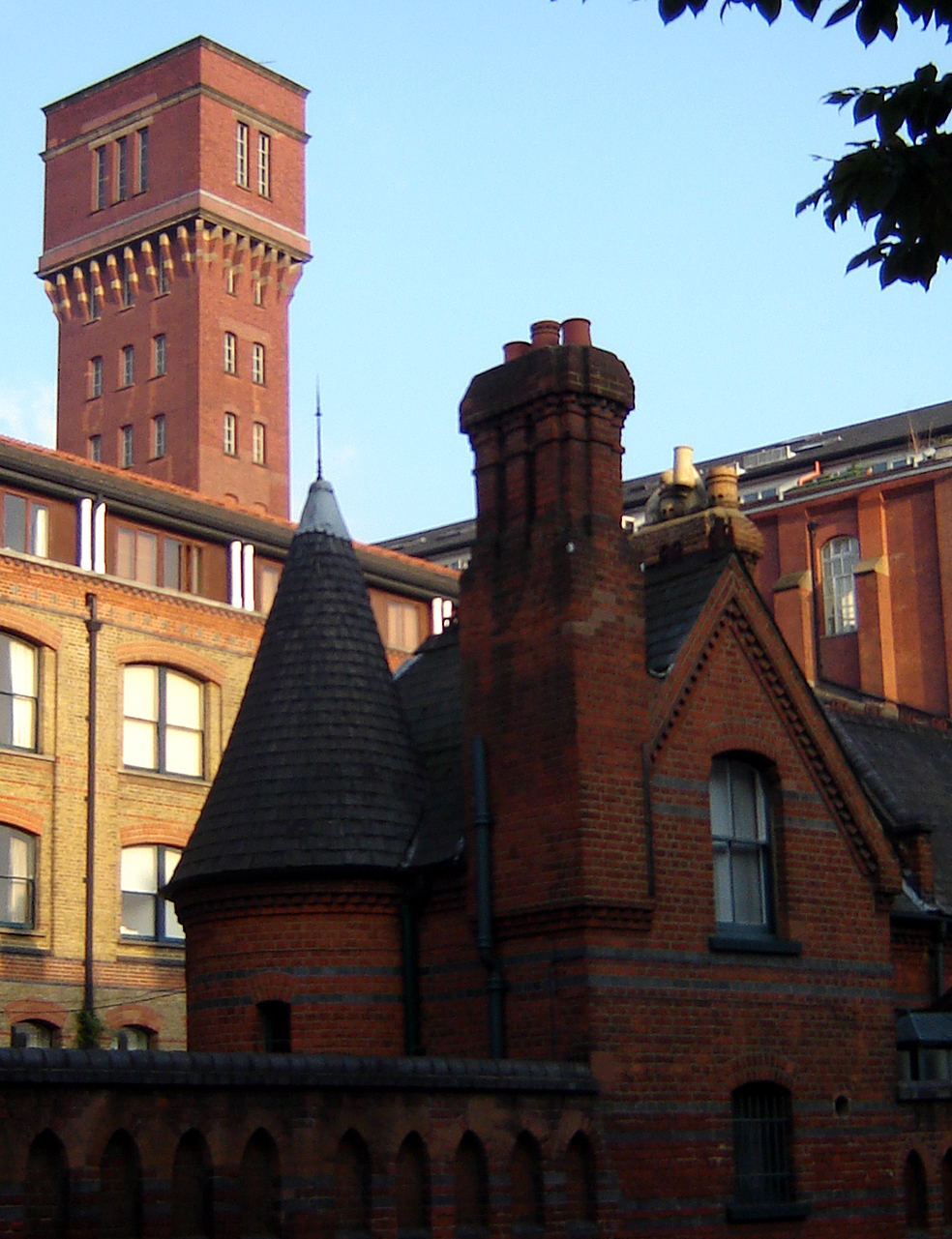
- Former Bryant and May match factory

- Location within Greater London
- Population: 27,720 (2011 census Bow East and Bow West wards)
- OS grid reference: TQ365825
  - Charing Cross: 4.6 mi (7.4 km) W
- London borough: Tower Hamlets
- Ceremonial county: Greater London
- Region: London
- Country: England
- Sovereign state: United Kingdom
- Post town: LONDON
- Postcode district: E3
- Dialling code: 020
- Police: Metropolitan
- Fire: London
- Ambulance: London
- UK Parliament: Stratford and Bow
- London Assembly: City and East

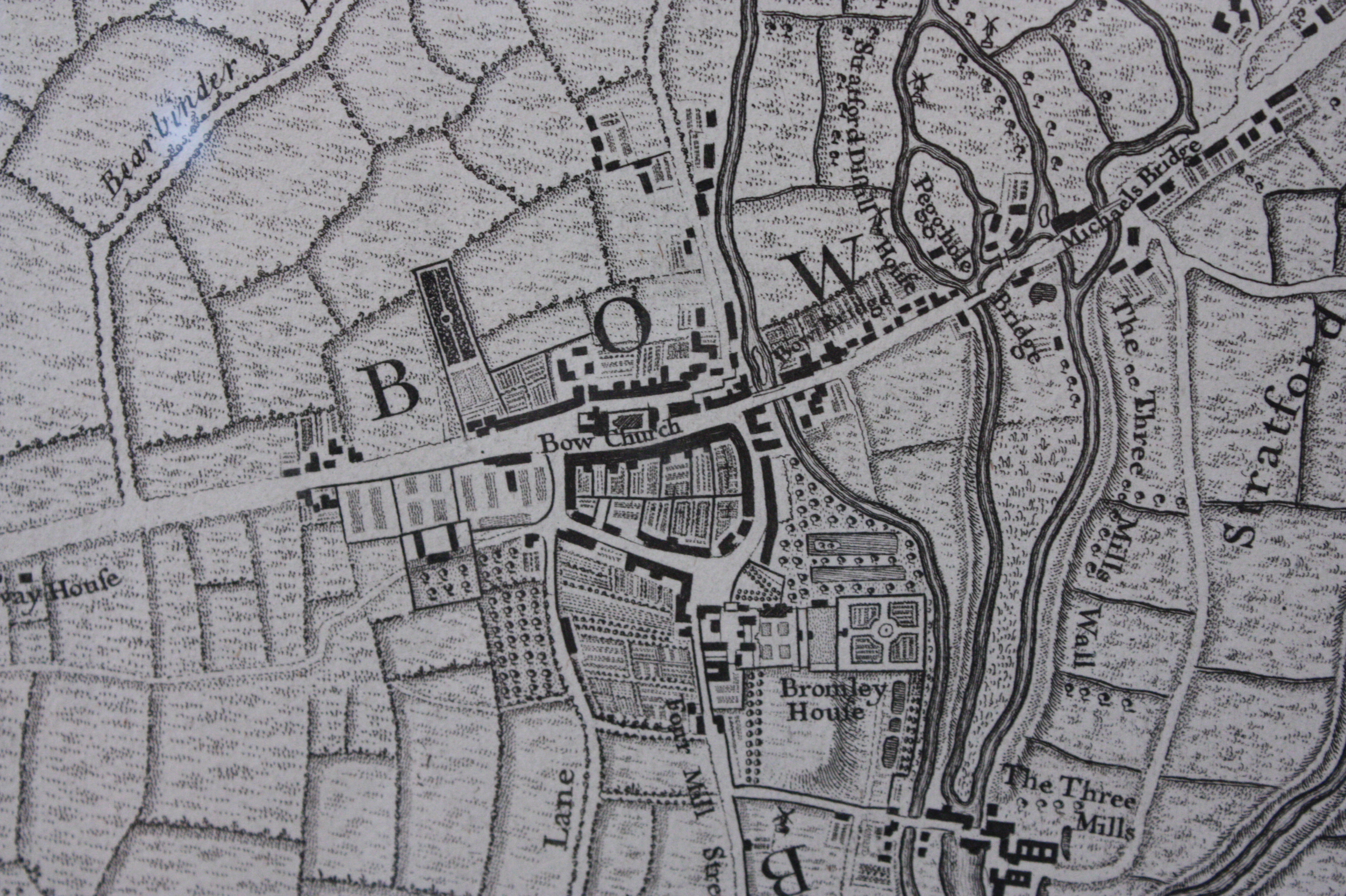
Bow as shown on John Rocque's map of London, 1747

Bow (/ˈboʊ/) is a district in East London, England and is in the London Borough of Tower Hamlets. It is an inner-city suburb located 4.6 miles (7.4 km) east of Charing Cross.

Historically in Middlesex, it became part of the County of London in 1888. "Bow" is an abbreviation of the medieval name Stratford-at-Bow, in which "Bow" refers to the bow-shaped bridge built here in the early 12th century. Bow contains parts of both Victoria Park and the Queen Elizabeth Olympic Park. Old Ford and Fish Island are localities within Bow, but Bromley-by-Bow immediately to the south is a separate district. These distinctions have their roots in historic parish boundaries.

Bow underwent extensive urban regeneration including the replacement or improvement of council homes, with the impetus given by the staging of the 2012 Olympic Games at nearby Stratford.

== History ==
Bow formed a part of the medieval parish of Stepney until becoming an independent parish in 1719. The parish vestry then undertook this responsibility until a rising population created the need for the Poplar Board of Works in 1855. This was superseded by the Metropolitan Borough of Poplar in 1900 until it was absorbed into the London Borough of Tower Hamlets in 1965. The council offices in Poplar High Street became Poplar Town Hall on the formation of the Metropolitan Borough of Poplar in 1900.

=== Bridges ===
Stratforde was first recorded as a settlement in 1177, the name derived from its Old English meaning of paved way to a ford. The ford originally lay on a pre-Roman trackway at Old Ford about 600 metres (0.4 mi) to the north, but when the Romans decided on Colchester as the initial capital for their occupation, the road was upgraded to run from the area of London Bridge, as one of the first paved Roman roads in Britain. The 'paved way' is likely to refer to the presence of a stone causeway across the marshes, which formed a part of the crossing.

In 1110, Queen Matilda reputedly fell into the water at the ford on her way to Barking Abbey, and consequently ordered a distinctively bow-shaped, three-arched bridge to be built over the River Lea, The like of which had not been seen before. The area became known variously as Stradford of the Bow, Stratford of the Bow, Stratford the Bow, Stratforde the Bowe, and Stratford-atte-Bow (at the Bow) which over time was shortened to Bow to distinguish it from Stratford Langthorne on the Essex bank of the Lea. Land and Abbey Mill were given to Barking Abbey for maintenance of the bridge, who also maintained a chapel on the bridge dedicated to St Katherine, occupied until the 15th century by a hermit. This endowment was later administered by Stratford Langthorne Abbey. By 1549, this route had become known as The Kings Way, and later became known as the Great Essex Road.

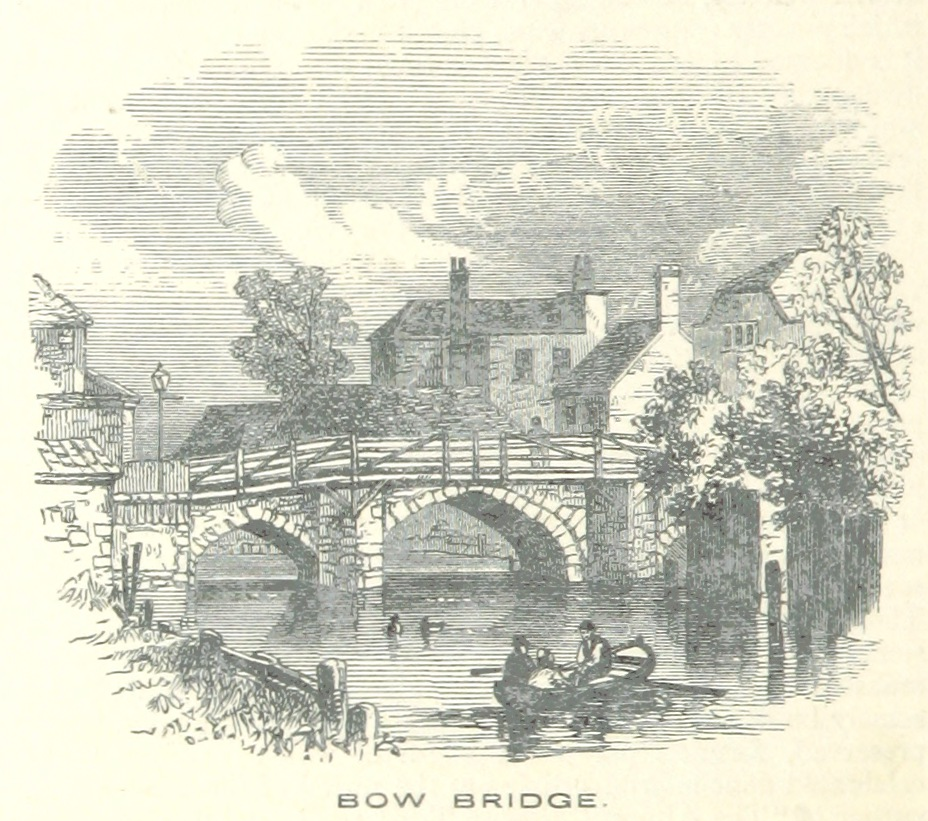
Bow Bridge depicted in 1851

Responsibility for maintenance of the bridge was always in dispute, no more so than with the Dissolution of the Monasteries, when local landowners who had taken over the Abbey lands were found responsible. The bridge was widened in 1741 and tolls were levied to defray the expense, but litigation over maintenance lasted until 1834, when the bridge needed to be rebuilt and landowners agreed to pay half of the cost, with Essex and Middlesex sharing the other. The bridge was again replaced in 1834, by the Middlesex and Essex Turnpike Trust, and in 1866 West Ham took responsibility for its upkeep and that of the causeway and smaller bridges that continued the route across the Lea.

In 1967 that bridge was replaced by a new modern bridge by the Greater London Council who also installed a two-lane flyover above it (designed by Andrei Tchernavin, son of Gulag escapee Vladimir V. Tchernavin) spanning the Blackwall Tunnel approach road, the traffic interchange, the River Lea and some of the Bow Back Rivers. This has since been expanded to a four-lane road.

=== Church and parish ===
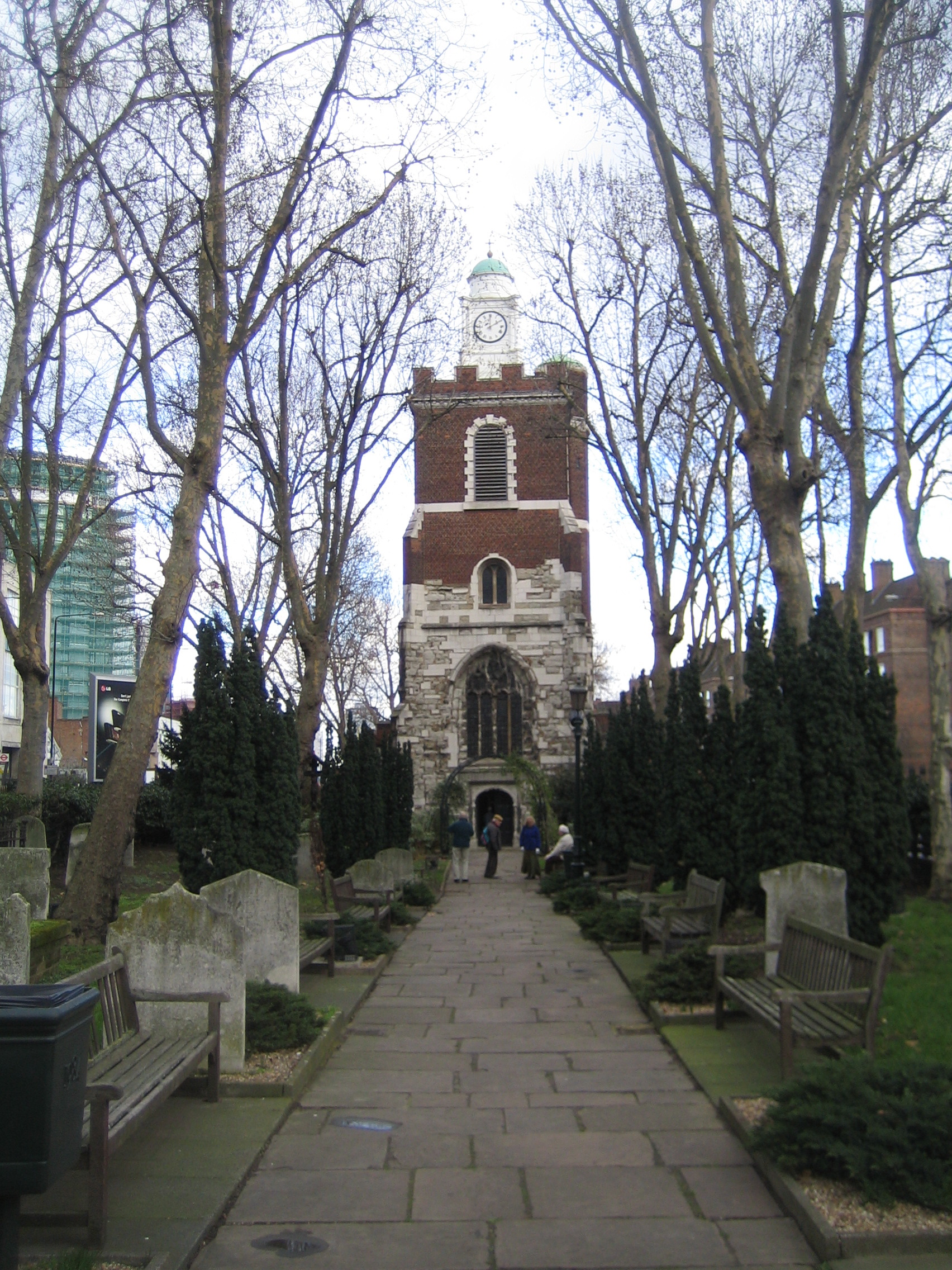
The Parish Church of St Mary and Holy Trinity, Stratford, Bow; known as Bow Church

Bow was an isolated hamlet by the early 14th century, some distance from its parish church of St Dunstan's, Stepney. In 1311 permission was granted to build St Mary's Church, Bow as a chapel of ease to allow the residents a more local and convenient place of worship. The land was granted by Edward III, on an 'island site' surrounded by the King's highway.

Bow was made an Anglican parish of its own in 1719, with St Mary's as its parish church. The new parish included the Old Ford area, which has also been known as North Bow.

=== Historic literature and song ===
There was a nearby Benedictine nunnery from the Norman era onwards, known as St Leonard's Priory and immortalized in Chaucer's description of the Nun Prioress in the General Prologue to his Canterbury Tales.

And Frenssh she spak ful faire and fetisly,

After the scole of Stratford atte Bowe,

For Frenssh of Parys was to hire unknowe.

The area was mentioned in the popular Tudor (or earlier) ballad, the Blind Beggar of Bethnal Green. In the ballad, the beautiful Bess, daughter of the blind beggar, leaves Bethnal Green to find a husband, follows the main road to Bow and then proceeds to Romford, where she finds many suitors.

=== Goose fair ===
Fairfield Road commemorates the Green Goose fair, held there on the Thursday after Pentecost. A Green Goose was a young or mid-summer goose, and a slang term for a cuckold or a 'low' woman. In 1630, John Taylor, a poet, wrote At Bow, the Thursday after Pentecost, There is a fair of green geese ready rost, Where, as a goose is ever dog-cheap there, The sauce is over somewhat sharp and deare, taking advantage of the double entendre and continuing with other verses describing the drunken rowdy behaviour of the crowds. By the mid-19th century, the authorities had had enough and the fair was suppressed.

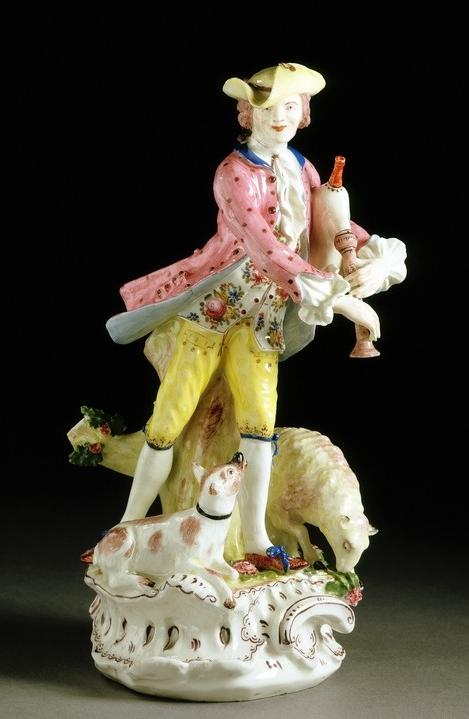
Figure following a Meissen model, about 1754, Bow Porcelain Factory (V&A Museum no. C.144-1931)

=== Bow porcelain ===
During the 17th century Bow and the Essex bank became a centre for the slaughter and butchery of cattle for the City market. Additionally the piggery which used the mash residue produced by the gin mills at Three Mills meant a ready supply of animal bones, and local entrepreneurs Thomas Frye and Edward Heylyn developed a means to mix this with clay and create a form of fine porcelain, said to rival the best from abroad, known as Bow Porcelain. In November 1753, in Aris's Birmingham Gazette, the following advertisement appeared:

This is to give notice to all painters in the blue and white potting way and enamellers on chinaware, that by applying at the counting-house at the china-house near Bow, they may meet with employment and proper encouragement according to their merit; likewise painters brought up in the snuff-box way, japanning, fan-painting, &c., may have an opportunity of trial, wherein if they succeed, they shall have due encouragement. N.B. At the same house, a person is wanted who can model small figures in clay neatly.

The Bow China Works prospered, employing some 300 artists and hands, until about 1770, when one of its founders died. By 1776 all of its moulds and implements were transferred to a manufacturer in Derby. In 1867, during drainage operations at the match factory of Bell & Black at Bell Road, St. Leonard's Street, the foundations of one of the kilns were discovered*, with a large quantity of 'wasters' and fragments of broken pottery. The houses close by were then called China Row, but now lie beneath modern housing. Chemical analysis of the firing remains showed them to contain high quantities of bone-ash, pre-dating the claim of Josiah Spode to have invented the bone china process. More recent investigations of documentary and archaeological evidence suggests the concern was to the north of the High Street and across the river.

=== 19th century (pre-1837) ===
Grove Hall Private Lunatic Asylum was established on the plot in 1820. This establishment primarily catered for ex-servicemen and was featured in Charles Dickens' novel Nicholas Nickleby (1839). It was replaced after it was shut and turned into Grove Hall Park was opened in 1909 following its purchase by the local authority in an auction in 1906. In 1878 it was the largest asylum in London with capacity for 443 inmates.

=== Victorian period (1837 to 1901) ===
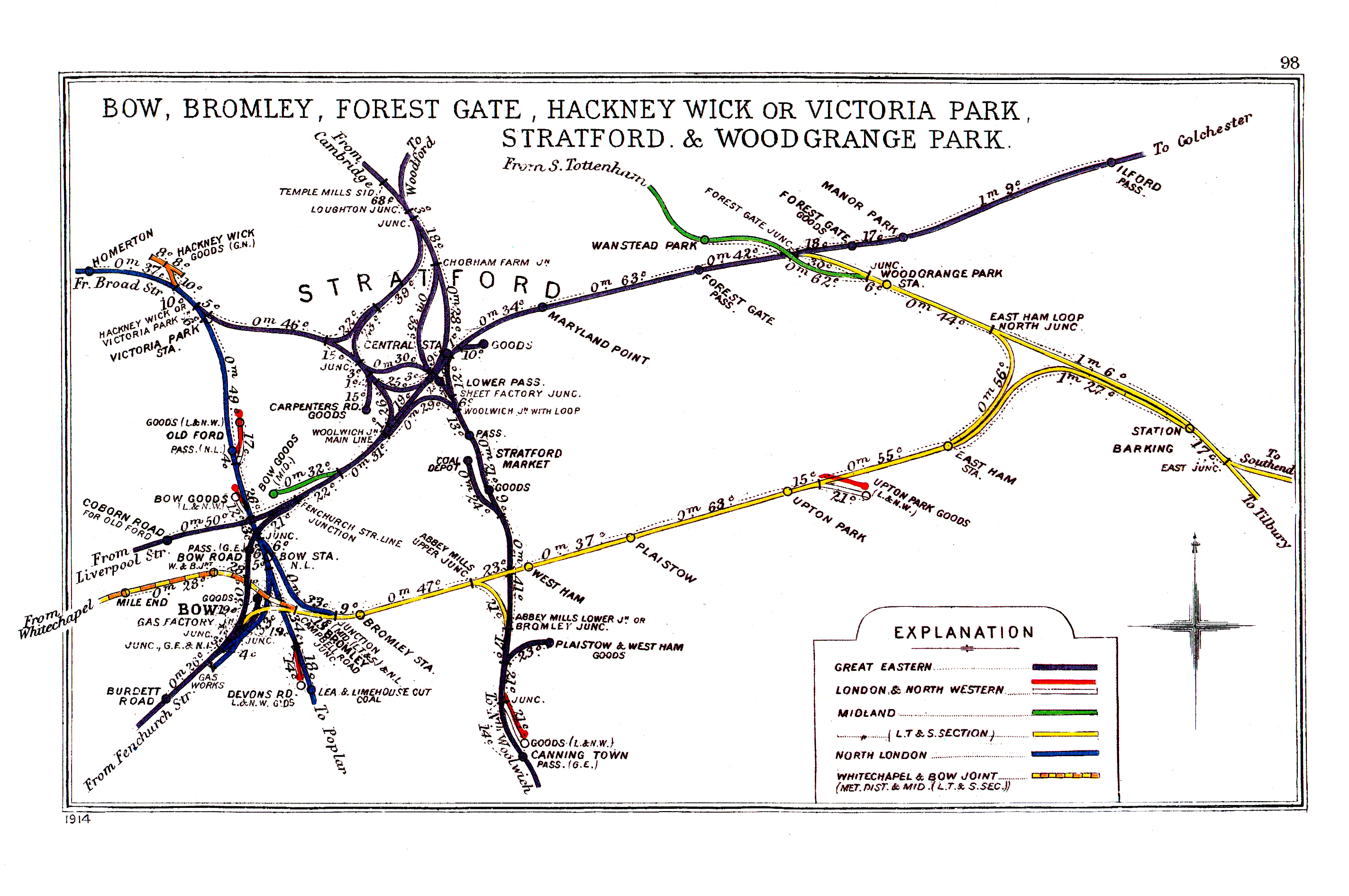
Railway lines around Bow (lower left) in 1914

In 1843 the engineer William Bridges Adams founded the Fairfield Locomotive Works, where he specialized in light engines, steam railcars (or railmotors) and inspection trolleys, including the Fairfield steam carriage for the Bristol and Exeter Railway and the Enfield for the Eastern Counties Railway. The business failed and the works closed c. 1872, later becoming the factory of Bryant and May.

Bow was the headquarters of the North London Railway, which opened its locomotive and carriage workshops in 1853. There were two stations, Old Ford and Bow. During World War II the North London Railway branch from Dalston to Poplar through Bow was so badly damaged that it was abandoned.

Bow station opened in 1850 and was rebuilt in 1870 in a grand style, designed by Edwin Henry Horne and featuring a concert hall that was 100 ft long (30 m) and 40 ft wide (12 m). This became The Bow and Bromley Institute, then in 1887 the East London Technical College and a Salvation Army hall in 1911. From the 1930s it was used as the Embassy Billiard Hall and after the war became the Bow Palais, but was demolished in 1956 after a fire.

The London E postcode area was formed in 1866, with the E3 sub-division in 1917.

A statue of William Ewart Gladstone stands outside Bow Church. It was donated in 1882 by Theodore H. Bryant, part-owner of the Bryant and May match factory.

Bow is also the setting of The Big Bow Mystery (1892), a detective novel by Israel Zangwill, which is often cited as an early example of a “locked-room” mystery in British crime fiction.

=== Women's rights, the matchgirls' strike, and Emmeline Pankhurst of the Suffragettes ===
In 1888, the matchgirls' strike occurred at the Bryant and May match factory in Fairfield Road. This was a forerunner of the suffragette movement fight for women's rights and also the trade union movement. The factory was rebuilt in 1911 and the brick entrance includes a depiction of Noah's Ark and the word 'Security' used as a trademark on the matchboxes. Match production ceased in 1979 and the building is now private apartments known as the Bow Quarter.

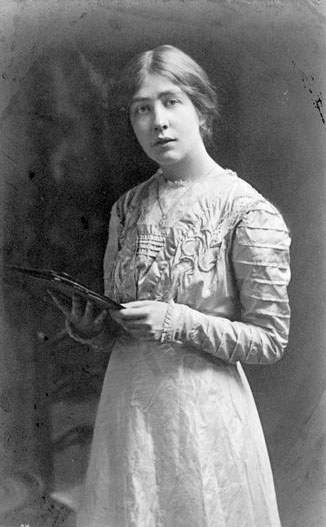
Sylvia Pankhurst 1882–1960

Emmeline Pankhurst began the Women's Social and Political Union (WSPU) in 1903 with her daughters Christabel and Sylvia. Sylvia became increasingly disillusioned with the Suffragette movement's inability to engage with the needs of working-class women like the match girls. Sylvia formed a breakaway movement, the East London Federation of Suffragettes, and based at 198 Bow Road, by the church, in a baker's shop. This was emblazoned with "Votes for Women" in large gold letters and opened in October 1912. The local Member of Parliament, George Lansbury, resigned his seat to stand on a platform of women's enfranchisement. Sylvia supported him and Bow Road became the campaign office, culminating in a huge rally in nearby Victoria Park, but Lansbury was narrowly defeated and support for the project in the East End was withdrawn.

Sylvia refocused her efforts from Bow, and with the outbreak of World War I began a nursery, clinic and cost price canteen for the poor at the bakery. A paper, the Women's Dreadnought, was published to bring her campaign to a wider audience. At the close of war, the Representation of the People (Amendment) Act 1918 gave limited voting rights to property-owning women over the age of 30, and equal rights were finally achieved ten years later.

Pankhurst spent 12 years in Bow fighting for women's rights. She risked constant arrest and spent a lot of time in Holloway Prison, often on hunger strike. She finally achieved her aim, and along the way had alleviated some of the poverty and misery and improved social conditions for all in the East End.

=== 20th century (1901 to 1999) ===
Poplar Town Hall was built for the Metropolitan Borough of Poplar (which was formed from Poplar, Bow and Bromley-by Bow) in the mid-1930s at the corner of Bow Road and Fairfield Road; it is now used as commercial offices. It contains the Poplar Assembly Rooms, now no longer used. The Builders, by sculptor David Evans is a frieze on the face of the building, unveiled by George Lansbury, MP for Bow and Bromley, on 10 December 1938: the Portland Stone panels commemorate the trades constructing the Town Hall and symbolise the borough's relationship with the River Thames and the youth of Poplar.

A memorial to Lansbury stands on the corner of Bow Road and Harley Grove, near 39 Bow Road which was his family home in the constituency until it was destroyed in the Blitz. It describes him as "A great servant of the people". Lansbury was twice Mayor of Poplar and MP for Bromley and Bow. In 1921, he led the Poplar Rates Rebellion. His daughter-in-law, Minnie Lansbury, was one of the 30 Poplar councillors sent to prison, and died six weeks after leaving prison. A memorial clock to her is over a row of shops on Bow Road, near the junction with Alfred Street.

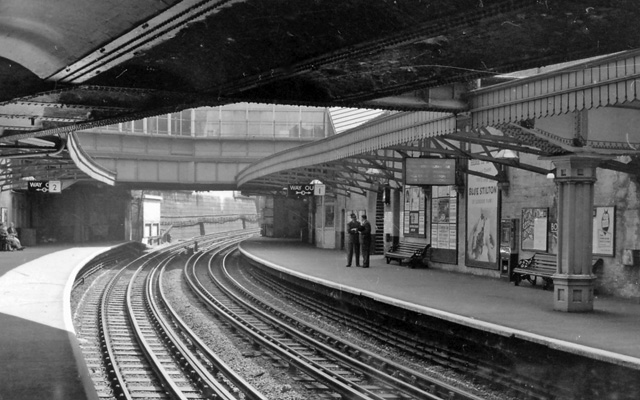
Bow Road railway station, platform level, looking eastward towards Essex (1961)

Ownership of Bow Road railway station passed from British Rail to the London Transport Executive in 1950. The station building was placed as a Grade II listed building on 27 September 1973.

The Metropolitan Borough of Poplar was absorbed along with the boroughs of Stepney and Poplar into the London Borough of Tower Hamlets in 1965 as part of the newly formed Greater London.

Victoria Park became known for its open air music festivals, often linked with a political cause in the 1970/80s. In 1978, Rock Against Racism organised a protest event against growth of far-right organisations such as the National Front. The concert was played by The Clash, Steel Pulse, X-Ray Spex, The Ruts, Sham 69, Generation X, and the Tom Robinson Band.

In 1975, the Baroness Burdett Coutts Drinking Fountain was given Grade II* listed status by Historic England.

Bromley Public Hall, the old vestry hall for neighbouring Bromley-by-Bow (St Leonard's Parish), can be seen on the south side of the Bow Road boundary, near the DLR station. It continues in use for registrations of births and marriages.

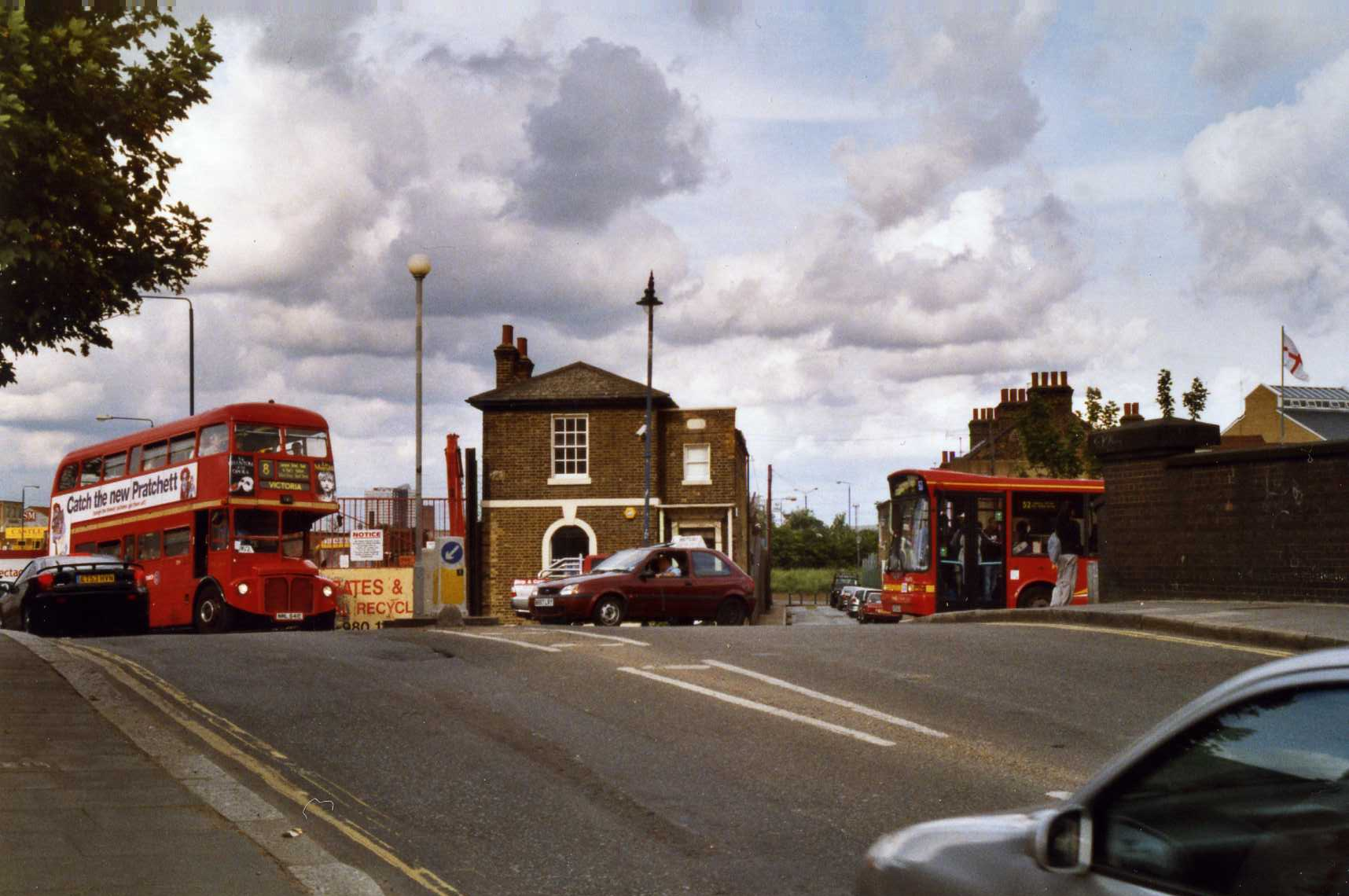
Last day of the AEC Routemaster, Tredegar Road, 4 June 2004

In 1986 the Greater London Council transferred responsibility for the park to the London borough of Tower Hamlets and the London Borough of Hackney, through a joint management board. Since 1994 Tower Hamlets has run the park alone.

Between 1986 and 1992 the name Bow applied to one of seven neighbourhoods to whom power was devolved from the council. This resulted in replacement of much of the street signage. Bow West and Bow East are two wards formed in 2002 that incorporate Old Ford and parts of Bethnal Green and Mile End.

In 1991, St Paul's, Old Ford was closed due to poor maintenance and safety concerns. This led to a successful campaign to raise more than £3,000,000 to renovate the church, so that it could continue to be used as a church, and also to better serve the local community.

Channel 4’s The Big Breakfast was broadcast live from a former lockkeeper's cottages located on Fish Island, in Old Ford, from 28 September 1992 until 29 March 2002.

Rachel Whiteread's temporary public sculpture "House" was created on Grove Road, being completed on 25 October 1993 and demolished eleven weeks later on 11 January 1994. The work won her the Turner Prize and K Foundation art award in November 1993.

Bow Arts was set up in 1994 by Marcel Baettig and Marc Schimmel, the owner of the then new premises. It became an artist studio supporting over 100 working artists. In 1995, the Trust became a registered arts and education charity. In 1996, after an Arts Council England grant, they were able to build the Nunnery Gallery on Bow Road.

=== 21st century (from 2000) ===
An annual fête and music festival held on Wennington Green in Mile End Park initiated by the vicar of St Barnabas Bethnal Green and called the St Barnabas Community Fete (or Bowstock) ran from 2003 to 2010, with the 2007 fete being part of a case study in the 'Community' section of the Living Britain report published by Zurich and The Future Laboratory.

In 2003, H. Forman and Son learned of London's bid to host the 2012 Summer Olympics. The company would have had to relocate from Stratford following a Compulsory Purchase Order. Then Mayor of London, Boris Johnson, officially opened the newly finished smokehouse in Old Ford in 2009. Following the compulsory purchase, the company rebuilt its premises near to the Olympic Park, on the banks of the River Lee.

In 2010 the National Lottery Big Lottery Fund awarded the London Borough of Tower Hamlets a £4.5 million grant towards a £12 million programme of major improvements to Victoria Park.

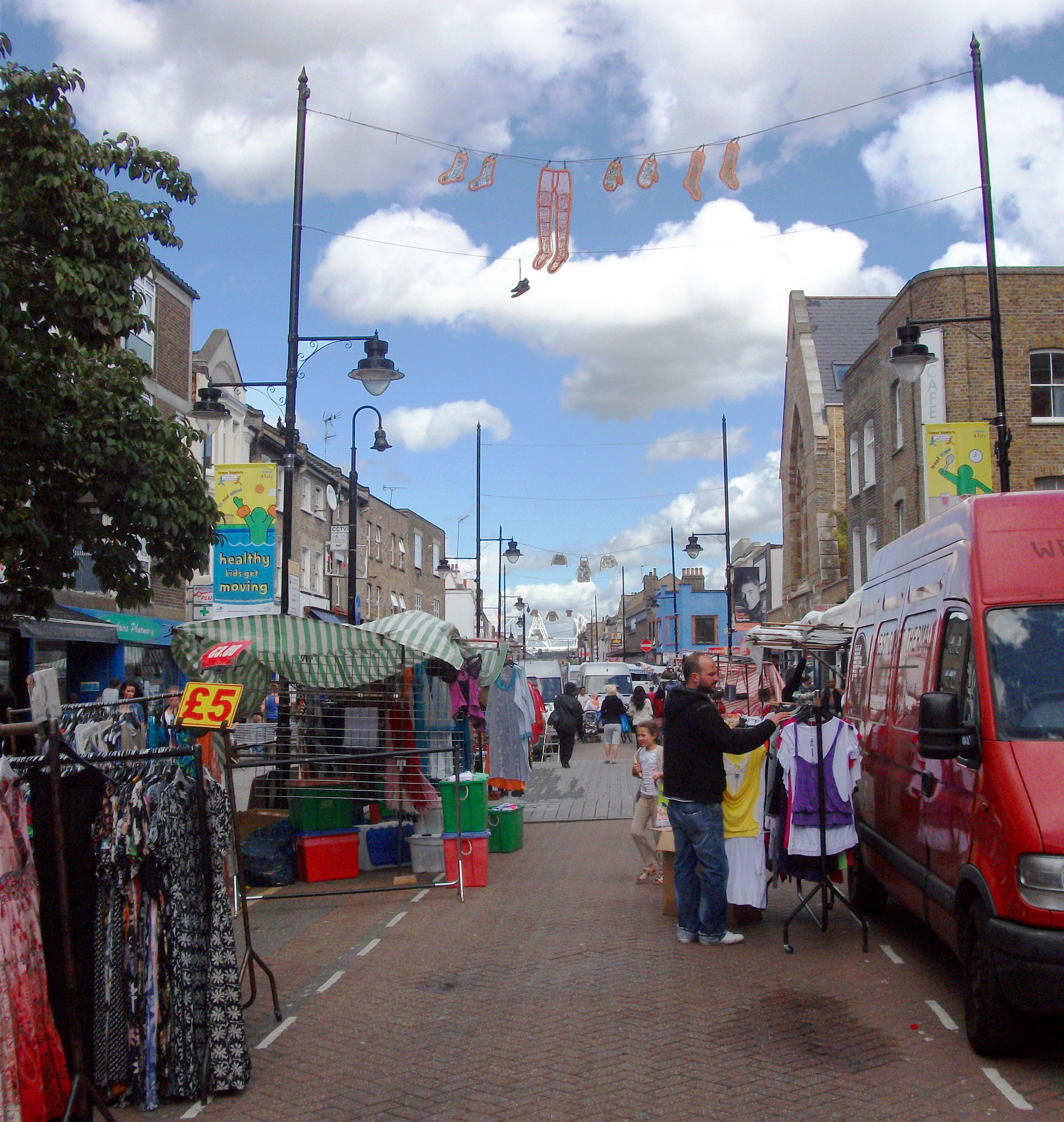
Roman Road Market, Bow town centre, (the London Stadium in Stratford is seen in the background).

Fish Island has a long history as a home to artists and art spaces, having one of the highest densities of fine artists, designers and artisans in Europe according to a 2009 study which found around 600 artists' studios. In September 2014 Bow School moved from the old site off Fairfield Road to a new site in Bromley-by-Bow 1 mile to the south-east by Bow Locks, in a new building designed by van Heyningen and Haward Architects.

In 2014 local residents organized the first Roman Road Festival, a celebration of local life, business, and art. This grew to encompass dozens of events and hundreds of volunteers and led to the creation of the Roman Road Trust. In 2015, Roman Road was a top three finalist within the London category of for that year's Great British High Street awards.

Cycle Superhighway 2 was upgraded between Bow and Aldgate and was completed in April 2016, with separated cycle tracks replacing cycle lanes along the majority of the route. A street party was held on Roman Road to mark the Queen Official Birthday on 11 June 2016, all profits from the stalls sales being shared with Bow Foodbank.

An orchard project was designed to celebrate the public green spaces in the Old Ford Estate in 2017, it was launched in response to feedback from local residents who wished to make better use of green space.

The Palm Tree pub building was Grade II listed in 2015 by Historic England.

As part of the Bow town centre scheme, it was announced in 2019 that money had been given to Tower Hamlets Council as part of GLA liveable neighbourhoods programme.

== Geography ==
Bow has not been an administrative unit for nearly 100 years, and this makes definitions of the extent of the area difficult. There are two principal influences on perceptions of the extent of Bow: the historic hamlet which became an ancient parish, and the E3 postal area. The former common known as Bow Common lay far to the south of either of these defined areas, just beyond the southern boundary of the Bromley-by-Bow area.

=== Ancient parish ===
Bow was originally a hamlet of the Ancient Parish of Stepney; in this context, hamlet refers to a district, a sub-division of a parish with delegated responsibilities, rather than a small village. It is not clear when the Hamlet of Bow was established.

Bow became an independent parish when the pre-existing hamlet separated from Stepney in 1719, to become a late formed ancient parish, the area being a basis for both civil and ecclesiastical administration. The boundaries of the hamlet, which later became the parish, are the only formally defined boundaries the area has had.

The new parish took the Hamlet's boundaries, in this way it inherited Stepney's boundaries with Hackney to the north and the Stratford area of the parish of West Ham over the Lea to the east. The boundary with Bromley by Bow to the south ran along Bow Road, though it arced a little to the south near Bow Church and Bow Bridge. The western boundary, with what remained of Stepney ran in the vicinity of Coborn, Lyal and Driffield Roads, with further fission of the parish meaning the areas to the west become the independent parishes of Bethnal Green and Mile End Old Town.

The area was part of the historic (or ancient) county of Middlesex, but military and most (or all) civil county functions were managed more locally, by the Tower Division (also known as the Tower Hamlets).

The role of the Tower Division ended when Bow became part of the new County of London in 1889. The County of London was replaced by Greater London in 1965.

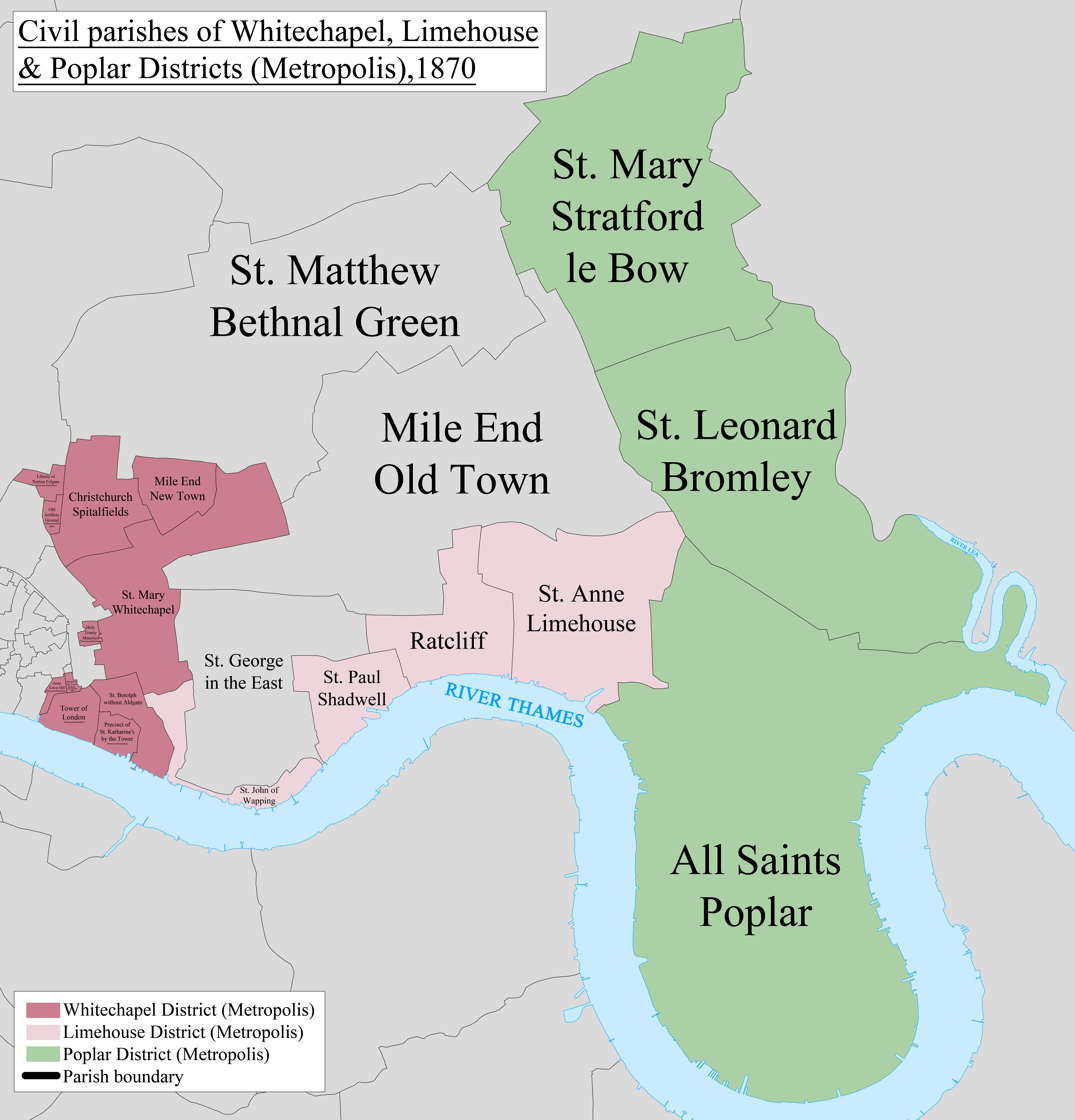
The parishes that would ultimately become the London Borough of Tower Hamlets.

In 1900 Bow merged into the Metropolitan Borough of Poplar, together with Poplar and Bromley-by-Bow. The new Borough preserved the identities of the constituent areas through the names and boundaries of its electoral wards. On 1 April 1907 the parish was abolished to form Poplar Borough. At the 1901 census (the last before the abolition of the parish), Bow had a population of 41,989.

The parish boundaries of Bow, Bromley and Poplar preserved in ward boundaries within the former Metropolitan Borough of Poplar.

The Metropolitan Boroughs of Poplar, Stepney and Bethnal Green united to form the London Borough of Tower Hamlets in 1965, meaning that Bow came to form the north-east part of the new borough.

=== E3 postal area ===
Bow is closely associated with the E3 postcode area, formed in 1917, but post code areas were never intended to define districts. E3 excludes parts of the Bow parish area north of the Hertford Union Canal and extends far to the south of Bow Road to include most of Bromley by Bow – as far south as the Limehouse Cut. It reaches as far west as the Regents Canal to take in parts of Bethnal Green and Mile End, and stretches over the Lea to take in Three Mills and the Twelvetrees Business Park in the old parish of West Ham.

== Governance and representation ==
Bow is the north-east part of the London Borough of Tower Hamlets.

For Planning Policy purposes, a Neighbourhood Plan is being prepared for an area referred to as Roman Road Bow. This area affected includes much of Bow and part of Mile End. The Neighbourhood Plan is intended to produce locally specific policies to complement the Tower Hamlets Local Plan. Roman Road Bow Neighbourhood Plan has been initiated by Roman Road Trust, who are a community development organisation which is developing a community led vision for a flourishing high street and community in the area. The Steering Committee for the Roman Road Bow Neighbourhood Plan led the neighbourhood forum who currently meets every three weeks.

Since 2010 Rushanara Ali of the Labour Party is the local MP for the Bethnal Green and Bow constituency.

== Community ==
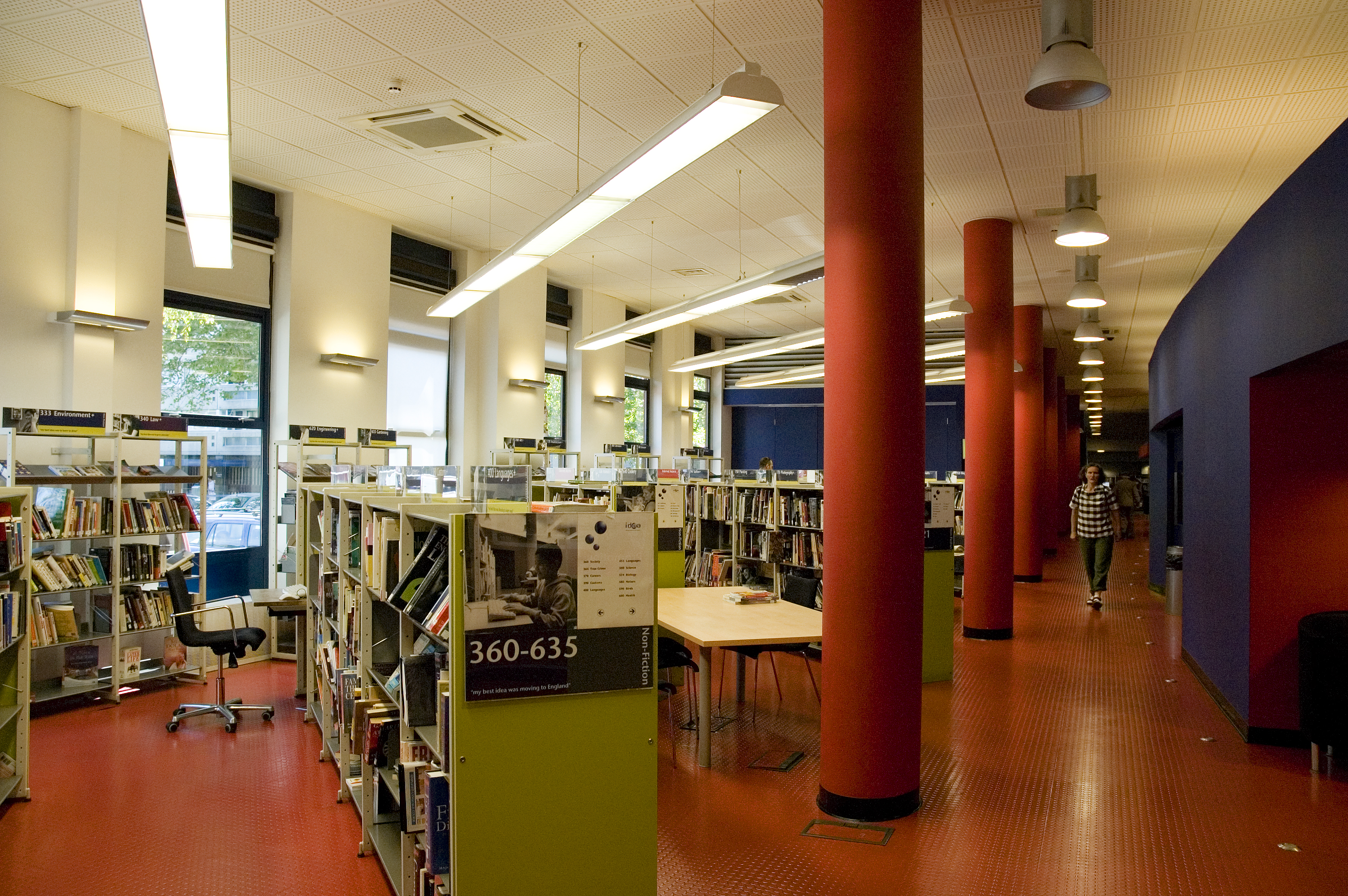
Inside the Bow Idea Store, on Roman Road (2008)

The first Idea Store, a chain of educational community centres initiated by the Tower Hamlets Council, opened in Bow in 2002.

Roman Road Community Land Trust is an initiative that seeks to protect the diverse community by providing truly affordable housing and aims to create an alternative solution for residents who are being forced out of the area due to increased property prices.

Roman Road LDN is a hyperlocal magazine covering Bow as well as Old Ford and Globe Town and launched as a full-time publication in 2018. In 2019 the magazine had 2,500 subscribers, 10,000 followers on social media, and nearly 100,000 unique readers a year.

The Bow Arts Trust operates a Low Cost Accommodation scheme throughout the area. This provides housing for artists who have an interest in community work to have an affordable working space.

Ability Bow is a specialised gym for those with disabilities or long-term health conditions and offers one-to-one exercise sessions, it has specialist gym equipment with tailored fitness programmes for each member.

== Churches ==
Bow Church (St Mary and Holy Trinity) is the historic parish church. It forms part of the Bow Group of Anglican churches, together with St Paul's, Bow Common; All Hallows, Bow; St Paul's, Old Ford and St Barnabas Bethnal Green. Other local churches include the Roman Catholic Church of Our Lady and St Catherine of Siena, built in 1870, and Victoria Park Baptist Church, built 1872.

== Services ==
A delivery office called the Bow Delivery Office is located in north Bow on Tredegar Road. with mail services provided by Royal Mail. Bow is in the Bow district but also recently partly in the Olympic Park district E20. Since the closure of the East London mail centre in 2012, all inward mail for the E postcode area is now sorted at Romford Mail Centre.

The Bow PDSA Pet Hospital is located on Malmesbury Road.

== Education ==
St Agnes, Chisenhale Olga and Malmesbury primary schools are located in Bow, as is Central Foundation Girls School on Bow Road. Cherry Trees School is a specialist primary school located at Campbell Road in Bow.

== Transport ==
=== Rail ===
Bow is connected to the London Underground at Bow Road tube station on the District and Hammersmith & City lines and also the Docklands Light Railway Stratford-Canary Wharf line at Bow Church DLR Station.

=== Buses ===
London Buses routes 8, 25, 108, 205, 276, 309, 323, 425, 488, D8, N25 and N205 all operate within the area.

=== Roads ===
The A11 (Bow Road) passes east–west in south Bow, linking the area to Aldgate in the west and Stratford in the east. At Stratford, the road meets the A12 where eastbound traffic can continue towards Romford, the M11 (for Stansted Airport) and destinations in Essex.

Bow is part of the council controlled parking zone and is covered by Zone B and includes all mini zones (B1/2/3) within the district boundaries. Additionally Saturday controls are enforced in north Bow.

=== Cycling ===
Bow is on London-wide and National and cycle networks. Public cycling infrastructure in the locale is provided by both Transport for London (TfL) and the London Borough of Tower Hamlets. Routes include:

- National Cycle Route 1 (NCR 1) - a long-distance leisure cycle route between Dover, Kent and the Shetland Islands, Scotland and forms part of the National Cycle Network. The route passes through Victoria Park and Mile End Park on traffic-free shared use paths. In North London, the route runs from Canary Wharf to Enfield Lock.
- Cycle Superhighway 2 (CS2) - a commuter cycling route from Aldgate in the City to Stratford in the east. The route runs signposted, unbroken and traffic-free on cycle track for the majority of the route. The route follows (Bow Road) through Bow, and the track is coloured blue.
- Cycleway between Hackney and the Isle of Dogs - a proposed commuter cycle route made in 2019.

== Industry ==
=== Bow power station ===
Bow power station was a major 51.5 MW electricity generating station located in Marshgate Street, Bow. It was constructed by the Charing Cross and Strand Electricity Supply Corporation which had obtained legal powers in 1899 to supply electricity to the City of London in competition with the City of London Electric Lighting Company. It was the first three-phase generating plant in the UK when it opened in 1902. The station transmitted electricity at 10,000 V through underground cables through the districts of Poplar, Mile End and Whitechapel to substations in the City and West End. A characteristic of the station were the 16 circular steel cooling towers, 30 ft (11 m) in diameter and 85 ft (26 m) high. Coal was delivered to the power station along the River Lea and its channels.

In 1925 Bow became part of the London Power Company (LPC). The LPC wished to consolidate electricity generation in a small number of high output station including Bow. The other stations were Deptford Power Station started in 1925 and completed in 1929 and Battersea A Power Station started in 1929 and completed in 1934. Bow power station was rebuilt and re-equipped several times. Upon nationalisation of the electricity industry in 1948 ownership of Bow power station was transferred to the British Electricity Authority (1948–55), and finally to the Central Electricity Generating Board (1958–69).

Bow power station closed in 1969 and was subsequently demolished.

== Notable people ==
The following people have lived, or currently live or had an education, in Bow:

=== Actors and entertainers ===
- Donald Crisp (1882 to 1974) – award-winning actor, born in Bow.
- Derek Martin, actor and stuntman; born in Bow
- Graham Norton – comedian and television presenter; lives in Bow
- Danny Wallace – filmmaker, comedian, writer, actor, and presenter of radio and television; lives in Bow.
- Roger Allam – actor known for ITV's Endeavour, born in Bow.

=== Authors ===
- Rosa Nouchette Carey (1840-1909) – children's novelist; born in Stratford-le-Bow
- Kia Abdullah – author; born in Mile End, went to school in Bow.

=== Musicians ===
- Amy Winehouse (1983 to 2011) – jazz singer-songwriter; had a flat in Bow.
- Dizzee Rascal - grime MC, from Bow.
- Tinchy Stryder - grime MC, from Bow
- Wiley - grime MC, pioneer and record producer, from Bow.

=== Sportspeople ===
- Ashley Cole – footballer, played for Arsenal's invincibles; born in Stepney; attended Bow Boys School in Bow.
- Ledley King – former footballer; defender for Tottenham Hotspur; born in Bow
- Lotte Wubben-Moy – footballer; plays for Arsenal and for England; born in Bow

=== Others ===
- John Robertson (1816 to 1891) – Premier of New South Wales, Australia, on five occasions between 1860 and 1886; born in Bow.
- Clara Grant (1867 to 1949) – educational pioneer and social reformer, lived and worked in Bow

== See also ==
- List of people from Tower Hamlets
- Bow Group (centre-right think tank that first met in Bow)
- Kingsley Hall and the Tudor Manor House Bromley Hall in nearby Bromley-by-Bow
