= Bow railway works =

Coordinates: 51.5268°N 0.0190°W

Bow railway works was at Bow, an area of London, England, in the London Borough of Tower Hamlets. It was built in 1853 by the North London Railway.

Bow railway works was built by the North London Railway in 1853 on a 10-acre (40,000 m^{2}) site which also included a sizeable wagon repair shop, under the direction of William Adams the locomotive superintendent. At first it was used for the repair of locomotives purchased from outside contractors, but from 1860 it was enlarged to enable it to undertake locomotive construction. The first locomotive completed was 4-4-0T No. 43 which incorporated the Adams bogie, to improve high-speed stability. The last steam locomotive to be built at Bow was 4-4-0T No. 4 in 1906.

A new erecting shop was built in 1882 under Adams' successor J.C. Park, who continued producing 4-4-0 and 0-6-0 tank engines for the railway. At its height the workshops were employing 750 men. Between 1879 and 1901, thirty 0-6-0 tanks designed by J.C.Park were built, of which fourteen lasted until British Railways ownership, the last being taken out of service in 1958 some seventy years old.

== Merger and grouping ==
In 1908 the North London Railway was merged with the London and North Western Railway, and thereafter the works reverted to locomotive repairs. The North London Railway line was included in the L.N.W.R. electrification scheme between 1914 and 1923.

The L.N.W.R. was in turn grouped with other railways in North west England and Scotland to form the London Midland and Scottish Railway on 1 January 1923. Bow works was then the smallest of fifteen workshops owned by that company, but was one of the newest and best equipped. From 1927 it also became responsible for repairs to locomotives from the former London, Tilbury and Southend Railway following the closure of the repair facility at Plaistow.

In the 1930s the works developed and manufactured the Hudd automatic train warning system for the L.T.S.R., which later led to a British Railways (BR) team from the national headquarters setting up in Bow to develop BR's standard Automatic Warning System. The workshop, was badly damaged during the blitz and the wagon workshop destroyed.

In 1956 the workshop repaired diesel-electric locomotives for the nearby motive power depot at Devons Road (the first in the U.K. to become all-diesel).

The works closed in 1960, and the workload was transferred to Derby Works.

== Sources ==
- Larkin, Edgar (1992) An illustrated history of British Railway Workshops, Oxford: Oxford Publishing Co., 184 p., ISBN 0-86093-503-5
