= Limehouse (disambiguation) =

Limehouse is a district in London, England.

Limehouse may also refer to:

== Places nearby in London ==
- Limehouse (UK Parliament constituency)
- Limehouse (London County Council constituency) (1919–1949)
- Limehouse (ward), electoral district
- Limehouse Basin, connecting Regent's Canal with the Thames
- Limehouse Cut, a canal
- Limehouse Link tunnel, a road section
- Limehouse station, a joint railway station in Limehouse
- Limehouse railway station (1840–1926), another station in Limehouse

== Places in North America ==
- Limehouse, Ontario, Canada
- Limehouse, South Carolina, U.S.

== Other uses ==
- Limehouse (horse) (foaled 2001)
- Limehouse Declaration, 1981, forming the Social Democratic Party
  - Limehouse (play), 2017

== See also ==
- Limehouse Blues (disambiguation)
