= West India Docks railway station =

Former railway station in England

West India Docks
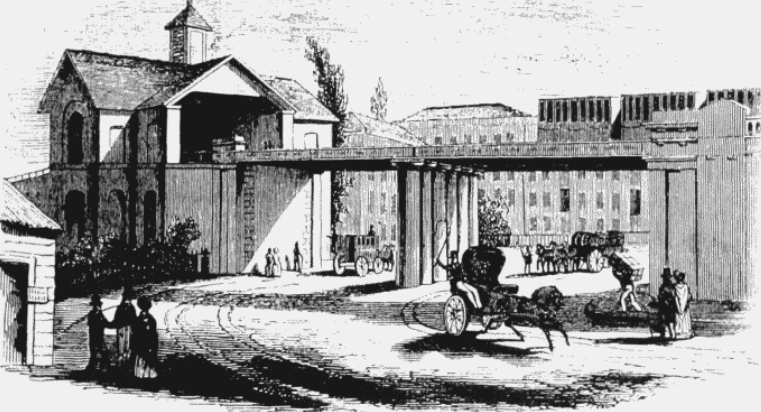
- Station and viaduct over West India Dock Road

General information
- Location: Poplar, Tower Hamlets
- Coordinates: 51.5086°N 0.0242°W
- Platforms: 2

Other information
- Status: Disused

History
- Opened: 6 July 1840
- Closed: 4 May 1926
- Original company: London and Blackwall Railway
- Pre-grouping: Great Eastern Railway
- Post-grouping: London and North Eastern Railway
Location
- Location in Tower Hamlets

West India Docks was a railway station in Poplar, east London, that was opened by the London and Blackwall Railway in 1840.

== History ==
West India Docks station opened on 6 July 1840. It was closed to passenger service on 4 May 1926, along with the rest of the LBR east of Stepney.

== Design ==
The station, including its timber platforms, was demolished in 1931-34 and today no trace of it remains, and the surrounding area has been heavily redeveloped.

== Location ==
It was situated between Limehouse and Millwall Junction stations, 2 miles 35 chains (3.9 km) down-line from Fenchurch Street. As the name implies, the station served the West India Docks in the Metropolitan Borough of Poplar, though it was located on the north side of the northernmost of the three docks; the London and Blackwall Railway was later extended to a new Millwall Docks station to serve the other two docks.

The station was located at the junction of Garford Street and West India Dock Road, west of the modern-day Aspen Way. The Docklands Light Railway line between Westferry and West India Quay runs through the station site, although the viaduct it runs on has been completely rebuilt.

Preceding station	Disused railways	Following station
Limehouse; Line and station closed	Great Eastern Railway; London and Blackwall Railway	Millwall Junction; Line and station closed
