= Millwall station =

Millwall station may mean:

- Millwall Docks railway station, station on the Millwall Extension Railway, closed 1926
- Millwall Junction railway station, station on the London and Blackwall Railway, closed 1926
- Millwall tube station, unbuilt Jubilee line station proposed in the 1970s
