= Poplar railway station =

Former railway station in England

Poplar
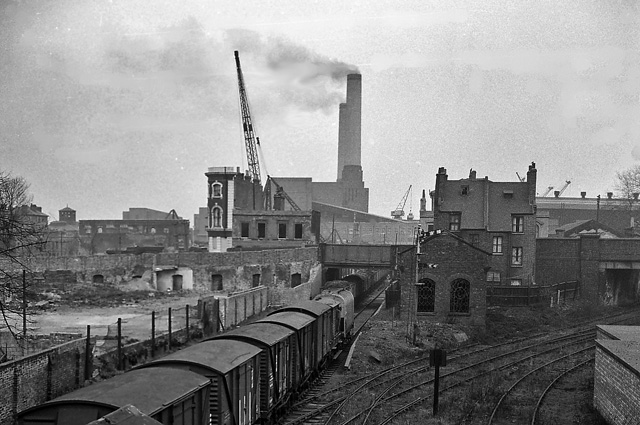
- Remains of the station in 1962

General information
- Location: Poplar, Tower Hamlets
- Coordinates: 51°30′29″N 0°00′24″W
- Platforms: 2

Other information
- Status: Disused

History
- Opened: 6 July 1840
- Closed: 4 May 1926
- Original company: London and Blackwall Railway
- Pre-grouping: Great Eastern Railway
- Post-grouping: London and North Eastern Railway
Location
- Location in Tower Hamlets

Poplar was a railway station in Poplar, London, that was opened in 1840 by the London and Blackwall Railway (LBR). It remained open until 4 May 1926, when all passenger services on the line east of Stepney ceased.

== History ==
The station was opened on 6 July 1840 on the west side of Brunswick Street, to the north of the Blackwall Yard shipyard, but was re-sited five years later across the road to the east side. It was closed in 1926, at which time it was owned by the London and North Eastern Railway.

== Design ==
No trace of the LBR's Poplar station remains today. The station buildings were demolished in the 1930s but the platforms remained as the railway fell into disuse in the 1960s before finally being demolished in the early 1980s to make way for the Docklands Light Railway.

== Location ==
It was situated between Millwall Junction and Blackwall, 3 miles 16 chains (5.1 km) down-line from Fenchurch Street.

During its life there was another station named Poplar on the North London Railway (NLR), which was situated by the East India Dock Road, to the north-west of the LBR station. The NLR station was referred to as Poplar (East India Road) to avoid confusion with the LBR station. Poplar (East India Road) closed in 1944 and its site is now occupied by All Saints DLR station.

The site is occupied by Aspen Way and is adjacent to Blackwall DLR station. The only remaining building of Poplar station's era is a former accumulator tower for the adjacent Poplar Dock. The station's current namesake, Poplar DLR station, lies to the west of the original LBR station site.

Preceding station	Disused railways	Following station
Millwall Junction; Line and station closed	Great Eastern Railway; London and Blackwall Railway	Blackwall; Line and station closed
