= Cannon Street station (disambiguation) =

Cannon Street station is a railway terminus and underground station in London.

Cannon Street station may also refer to:

- Cannon Street Road railway station, a station of the London and Blackwall Railway in England
- Hull Cannon Street railway station, a passenger terminus of the Hull and Barnsley Railway in England
