= Cannon Street Road railway station =

Disused railway station in England

Cannon Street Road

General information
- Location: St George in the East, Tower Hamlets
- Coordinates: 51.511554°N 0.061096°W
- Platforms: 2

Other information
- Status: Disused

History
- Opened: 21 August 1842
- Closed: November 1848
- Original company: London and Blackwall Railway
Location
- Location in Tower Hamlets

Cannon Street Road was a short-lived railway station in the parish of St George in the East, East London. It was on the London and Blackwall Railway (LBR) between Minories and Shadwell stations. The station opened on 21 August 1842 and closed in November 1848. Built cheaply and quickly, no trace remains of the station. It was located on a site now part of the London, Tilbury and Southend line and the Docklands Light Railway.

== History ==
The London and Blackwall Railway (LBR) was constructed on a brick viaduct through the parish of St George in the East and opened for passenger services on 6 July 1840. In October 1840, there was a proposal for an infill station on Cannon Street Road. On 5 April 1842, the line was opened for goods traffic. The railway was built to a non-standard track gauge and used cable haulage. A quirk of the traction system used was that trips between intermediate stations were not possible and all journeys must either begin or end at a terminus. The railway was built primarily to convey passengers to and from the river at Blackwall.

The station was opened on 21 August 1842. Opening was delayed by difficulties purchasing an existing building. The cost of providing the station was met by reducing expenses on the rest of the line. Trains ran every fifteen minutes from 08:00 to 21:15, with a break in service on Sundays between 10:15 and 13:00. Fares from the station were reduced from 3 November 1842. In 1845, a railway employee responsible for fares and tickets at the station was charged with stealing £25.65 (equivalent to £2,697 in 2025) from the daily takings.

In 1844 it was proposed that the line should convert to the atmospheric railway system and Cannon Street Road station should be closed. This was not progressed further. The station was closed in November 1848. (Note: Borley gives the closure date as November or December 1848. Butt gives the closure date as November 1848.) The railway was subsequently converted to steam locomotive haulage and standard gauge. The line through the site was widened to three tracks in 1862 and to four in 1893. No trace remains of the station. The track through the site became part of the London, Tilbury and Southend line. The original viaduct was demolished as part of the construction of the Docklands Light Railway.

== Design ==
Nothing remains of the station building. Little is known about the design. It was built cheaply in three weeks to a budget of £100 (equivalent to £9,777 in 2025). Recovered materials were used where possible. Connor speculates that the station platforms were on the viaduct crossing the road.

== Location ==
The station was located on Cannon Street Road in St George in the East, in a densely-populated part of the East End of London. The next station to the west was the penultimate station at Minories and the next station to the east was Shadwell. It was immediately north of the London Docks. The Thames Tunnel pedestrian subway opened to the southeast of the station in 1843.

== Notes ==
Preceding station	Historical railways	Following station
Leman Street	London and Blackwall Railway	Shadwell
