= Shadwell and St George's East railway station =

Former railway station in England

Shadwell and St George's East

General information
- Location: St George in the East, Tower Hamlets
- Coordinates: 51.5119°N 0.0544°W
- Platforms: 2

Other information
- Status: Disused

History
- Opened: 1 October 1840
- Closed: 7 July 1941
- Former names: Shadwell (1840–1900)
- Original company: London and Blackwall Railway
- Pre-grouping: Great Eastern Railway
- Post-grouping: London and North Eastern Railway
Location
- Location in Tower Hamlets

Shadwell was a railway station in the parish of St. George in the East, London. It was opened by the London and Blackwall Railway on 1 October 1840. The station was closed by the London and North Eastern Railway on 7 July 1941.

== History ==
Shadwell station was opened to passengers on 1 October 1840. It was three months after the rest of the London and Blackwall Railway (LBR), that had opened on 6 July 1840. Sunday service commenced in 1842. The railway was built to use cable haulage with stationary engines at each end of the line. It converted to steam locomotive traction in 1849. The Great Eastern Railway (GER) took over the line on 1 January 1866. GER trains started serving the station from c. 1875. The London, Tilbury and Southend Railway (LTSR) had the right to stop at Shadwell and Leman Street from 1891, although these powers were never used. North London Railway (NLR) service commenced on 1 October 1866 and ceased on 1 January 1869.

The station was renamed Shadwell and St George's East on 1 July 1900. (Note: The East London Railway station name changed from Shadwell to Shadwell and St George-in-the-East on the same day and reverted back in 1918.) It was temporarily closed during the First World War from 22 May 1916 to 5 May 1919. In 1920, evening and Sunday services were withdrawn at Leman Street and Shadwell. This was opposed by the central Labour Party, the Stepney trades council and the Stepney Borough Council. The GER amalgamated with several other railways to create the London and North Eastern Railway (LNER) on 1 January 1923, which absorbed the LBR. Passenger service east of Stepney on the Blackwall line ceased on 4 May 1926. Some trains between Fenchurch Street and Ilford, Loughton and Woolwich started to call at the station from 1926. During the Second World War, the station was closed permanently on 7 July 1941.

== Design ==
The station was not part of the original plans, so it did not share the same design as other stations on the line. The station stood on the original line built in 1839, which is elevated on a brick viaduct. Two further tracks, without platform faces were added in 1855 and 1893. It had narrow platforms cantilevered from the original viaduct. All platform buildings have been demolished. There was a subway connection to the nearby Shadwell East London Railway station, built in 1876.

== Location ==
The station was located in the parish of St George in the East. The subterranean Shadwell East London Railway station was located to the west. On the London and Blackwall route, it was located between Leman Street station to the west and Stepney station to the east. It was 1 mile 5 chains (1.7 km) down-line from Fenchurch Street. Contemporary Shadwell DLR station has been built partly on the site of the station.

== Notes ==
Preceding station	Disused railways	Following station
Cannon Street Road	London and Blackwall Railway	Stepney
