= Blackwall DLR station =

Docklands Light Railway station

Blackwall
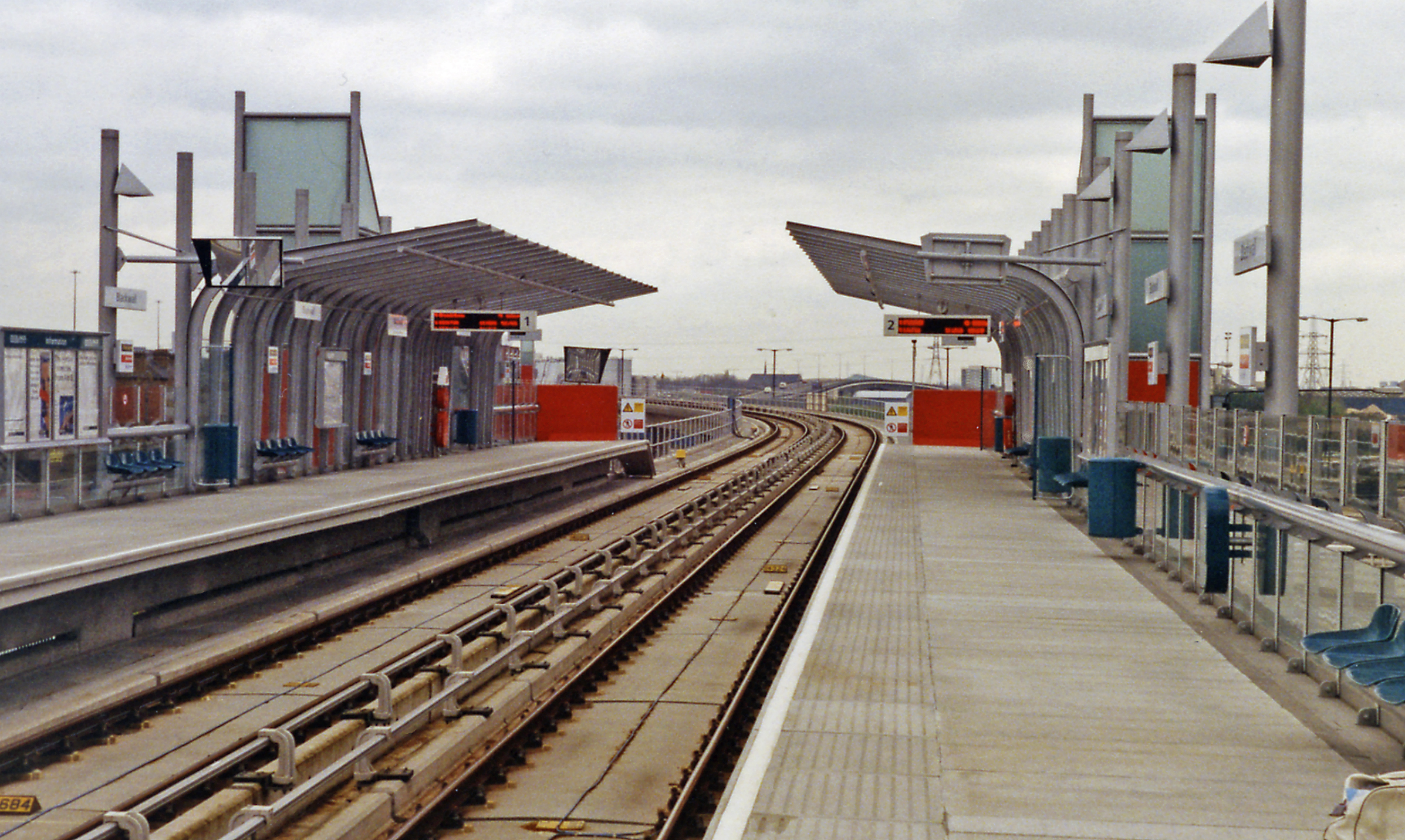
- Platforms looking east in 1994

General information
- Location: Blackwall, Tower Hamlets
- Coordinates: 51.5078°N 0.0070°W
- Owner: Transport for London
- Manager: Docklands Light Railway
- Platforms: 2

Construction
- Structure type: Elevated
- Accessible: Yes

Other information
- Status: Unstaffed
- Fare zone: 2
- Website: Official website

History
- Opened: 28 March 1994

Passengers

DLR annual entry and exit
- 2021: ▲1.098 million
- 2022: ▲1.360 million
- 2023: ▲1.510 million
- 2024: ▼1.39 million
- 2025: ▼1.30 million
Location
- Location in Tower Hamlets

Blackwall is a Docklands Light Railway (DLR) station in Blackwall, London, England. It is located very close to the northern entrance to the Blackwall road tunnel under the River Thames. The station is between Poplar and East India stations.

The DLR station opened, with the Beckton Branch, on 28 March 1994. There was a previous station very close to this site, called Poplar station, which was served by the London and Blackwall Railway from 6 July 1840 to 3 May 1926. Poplar station was along the route of Aspen Way just to the south and east of the DLR station. Blackwall station on the London and Blackwall Railway was actually farther east, on what is today Jamestown Way. A crossover west of the station allows trains from Beckton and Poplar to reverse here.

== Services ==
The typical off-peak service in trains per hour from Blackwall is:

- 6 tph to Tower Gateway
- 6 tph to Bank
- 6 tph to Beckton
- 6 tph to Woolwich Arsenal

Additional services call at the station during the peak hours, increasing the service to up to 16 tph in each direction.

Preceding station	DLR	Following station
Poplar towards Bank or Tower Gateway	Docklands Light Railway	East India towards Beckton or Woolwich Arsenal

== Connections ==
London Buses route 15 serves the station.
