= North Greenwich railway station =

Former railway station in England

North Greenwich
- Steam locomotive at the station c. 1900

General information
- Location: North Greenwich, Tower Hamlets
- Coordinates: 51°29′13″N 0°0′37″W
- Platforms: 1

Other information
- Status: Disused

History
- Opened: 29 July 1872
- Closed: 4 May 1926
- Pre-grouping: Great Eastern Railway
- Post-grouping: London and North Eastern Railway
Location
- Location in Tower Hamlets

North Greenwich was a railway station named after the North Greenwich area of the Isle of Dogs in London. It was located on the north side of the River Thames near Island Gardens in the east of the city.

The present-day North Greenwich station, on the London Underground's Jubilee line, is on a different site on the south side of the river, one mile downstream on the Greenwich Peninsula.

== History ==
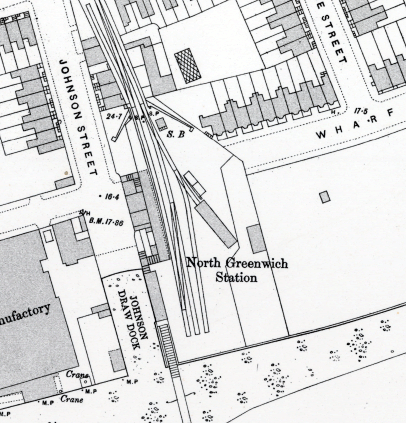
Map of North Greenwich station, 1890s

North Greenwich was the terminus of the Millwall Extension Railway (MER) branch of the London and Blackwall Railway, 4 miles 39 chains (7.2 km) down-line from the western terminus at Fenchurch Street, although services did not operate through to Fenchurch Street but instead connected to the Fenchurch Street-Blackwall service at Millwall Junction. Millwall Docks was the preceding station along the line. Opened in July 1872 (slightly later than the other stations on the branch) with the official name North Greenwich & Cubitt Town, it connected with a ferry service to Greenwich south of the river. The ferry was later replaced by the Greenwich Foot Tunnel.

Traffic at the station was always light and, as with the rest of the MER, it closed to passengers in May 1926,. The area was heavily redeveloped following the Docklands developments of the 1980s, and most of the Docklands Light Railway (DLR) between Island Gardens and South Quay utilises the old MER route. The original Island Gardens DLR station (at that time the DLR's southern terminus) was built on the north end of the original North Greenwich station site when the DLR opened in 1987. When the DLR was extended to Lewisham in the 1990s, a new Island Gardens DLR station was built on the opposite side of Manchester Road, and the former site was demolished and replaced by a block of flats.

Preceding station	Disused railways	Following station
Millwall Docks; Line and station closed	Great Eastern Railway; London and Blackwall Railway	Terminus
