= Leman Street railway station =

Former railway station in England

Leman Street
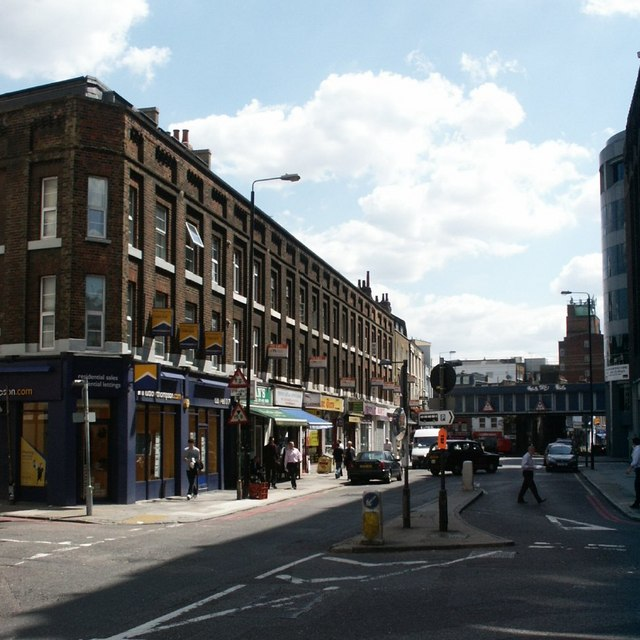
- Looking towards Leman Street Railway Bridge

General information
- Location: Whitechapel, Tower Hamlets
- Coordinates: 51.5111°N 0.0681°W
- Platforms: 2

Other information
- Status: Disused

History
- Opened: 1 June 1877
- Closed: 7 July 1941
- Pre-grouping: Great Eastern Railway
- Post-grouping: London and North Eastern Railway
Location
- Location in Tower Hamlets

Leman Street was a railway station in Whitechapel, East London. It was on London and Blackwall Railway (LBR) between Fenchurch Street and Shadwell stations. It was opened on 1 June 1877, serving the two local lines of the three tracks on the railway viaduct. Opening was delayed for four years due to issues with station design. It was rebuilt in 1893 when the viaduct was widened to accommodate an additional line. The station was closed on 7 July 1941.

== History ==
The London and Blackwall Railway (LBR) was constructed on a brick viaduct through the parish of Whitechapel and opened for passenger services on 6 July 1840. The railway was built to use cable haulage. It was subsequently converted to steam locomotive use in 1849. The line through the site was widened to three tracks in 1862. The LBR was leased to the Great Eastern Railway (GER) in perpetuity from 1 January 1866. Leman Street station was opened by the GER on 1 June 1877. The London, Tilbury and Southend Railway (LTSR) had the right to stop at Leman Street and Shadwell from 1891, although these powers were never used. A fourth track was provided through the site in 1893 and the station was rebuilt.

Early in the 20th century, passengers became better served by trams and buses, which caused patronage to drop. From 1 May 1916, during the First World War, the GER temporarily closed some suburban stations. Leman Street was closed from 22 May 1916 to 1 July 1919. In 1920, evening and Sunday services were withdrawn at Leman Street and Shadwell. This was opposed by the central Labour Party, the Stepney trades council and the Stepney Borough Council. The line became part of the London and North Eastern Railway (LNER) in 1923.

Passenger service east of Stepney on the Blackwall line ceased on 4 May 1926. In 1935 the area was re-signalled with the mechanical semaphore signals being replaced by colour light signalling. The signal box at Leman Street closed on 14 April 1935 with control passing to a new signal box at Fenchurch Street. The area was destroyed by bombing during the The Blitz and the station was damaged. It was closed permanently on 7 July 1941.

== Design ==
It was built on a constrained site, with platforms on two of the three lines through the station. Building work was completed by March 1873. On inspection, the design was found to have a number of defects that required modification. Platforms were widened, by cantilevering over the viaduct for the up platform and altering the footbridge between platforms so it did not take up clearance. This design also failed inspection in 1875. Extension of the down platform was required with works completed and approved in 1877.

The station was completely rebuilt in 1893 when a fourth track was added and the viaduct was widened so the station could be accommodated without the need for overhang. The booking hall had two ticket windows and a parcels office. Access to the platforms was via subway, removing the need for the 1877 footbridge. The red-brick booking hall at street level on the east side of Leman Street was demolished when the Docklands Light Railway was constructed. The 450 feet (140 m) platforms had red brick buildings and had 180 feet (55 m) awnings with 1890s GER-style valancing. The platforms buildings had toilets, waiting rooms and rooms for porters. Demolition of the platform buildings was approved in 1950 and started soon after.

== Location ==
The station was situated in Whitechapel, on the east side of Leman Street and near the junction with Cable Street. It was 38 chains (0.76 km) down the line from Fenchurch Street. The next station to the west was Fenchurch Street and the next station to the east was Shadwell. There were disused stations at Minories to the west and Cannon Street Road to the east, both closed before the Leman Street opened.

Preceding station	Disused railways	Following station
Minories	London and Blackwall Railway	Cannon Street Road
