= South Dock railway station =

Former railway station in England

South Dock

General information
- Location: Isle of Dogs, Tower Hamlets
- Coordinates: 51.5026°N 0.0129°W

Other information
- Status: Disused

History
- Opened: 29 July 1872
- Closed: 4 May 1926
- Pre-grouping: Great Eastern Railway
- Post-grouping: London and North Eastern Railway
Location
- Location in Tower Hamlets

South Dock was a railway station on the Isle of Dogs in east London.

== History ==
The Millwall Extension Railway (MER) opened to goods traffic on 18 December 1871 and to passenger services on 29 July 1872. The station was renamed South West India Dock in July 1881 but reverted to its original name of South Dock in May 1895. Passenger usage of the station was always light and services to it, and the rest of the MER extension, ceased in May 1926, though goods services continued until the demise of the docks in the 1970s.

== Design ==
It had an island platform as it was the only passing loop on the branch. The station buildings were of timber with a slate roof. Platform was brick faced. Station was staffed entirely by dock employees, company issued its own tickets. Extensive rebuilding in the 1980s Docklands redevelopment has left no trace of the station or the line.

== Location ==
It was between Millwall Junction and Millwall Docks on the MER branch of the London and Blackwall Railway (LBR). The station was on the northern side of the South Dock of the West India Docks, near the eastern end. It stood in a relatively isolated location in the docks area, some distance from the nearest road. Until the mid-2010s, the site was occupied by a BT telecommunications building. As of 2021, it is occupied by the 20 Water Street building, part of the Wood Wharf development.

Preceding station	Disused railways	Following station
Millwall Junction; Line and station closed	Great Eastern Railway; London and Blackwall Railway	Millwall Docks; Line and station closed
