= Millwall Junction railway station =

Former railway station in England

Millwall Junction

General information
- Location: Poplar, Tower Hamlets
- Coordinates: 51.5073°N 0.0128°W
- Platforms: 3

Other information
- Status: Disused

History
- Opened: 18 December 1871
- Closed: 4 May 1926
- Pre-grouping: Great Eastern Railway
- Post-grouping: London and North Eastern Railway
Location
- Location in Tower Hamlets

Millwall Junction was a railway station in Poplar, east London, on the London and Blackwall Railway (LBR).

== History ==
Millwall Junction was opened on 18 December 1871, the same time as the LBR's southern branch down to Millwall Docks opened, with three platforms – two on the line to Blackwall and a single one serving the branch line towards North Greenwich. The station was rebuilt in 1888 and remained open until 4 May 1926 when all passenger services on the LBR east of Stepney station (now Limehouse) were withdrawn, and Millwall Junction was closed. Goods services ran through until the 1960s. The station buildings were demolished in 1965 and the platforms removed in 1985 to make way for the Docklands Light Railway (DLR). The DLR's junction east of Poplar now occupies the station site.

== Location ==
Despite the name, it was not in Millwall, but rather it marked where the LBR southern branch to Millwall and North Greenwich, which served the West India Docks, branched off the main line. It was between West India Docks station and Poplar station, 2 miles 64 chains (4.5 km) down-line from Fenchurch Street, with South Dock the next stop on the Millwall branch.

| Preceding station | Disused railways | Following station |
|---|---|---|
| West India Docks; Line and station closed | Great Eastern Railway; London and Blackwall Railway; Blackwall Branch | Poplar; Line and station closed |
| West India Docks; Line and station closed | Great Eastern Railway; London and Blackwall Railway; Millwall Branch | South Dock; Line and station closed |
