= London and Blackwall Railway =

Former British railway company

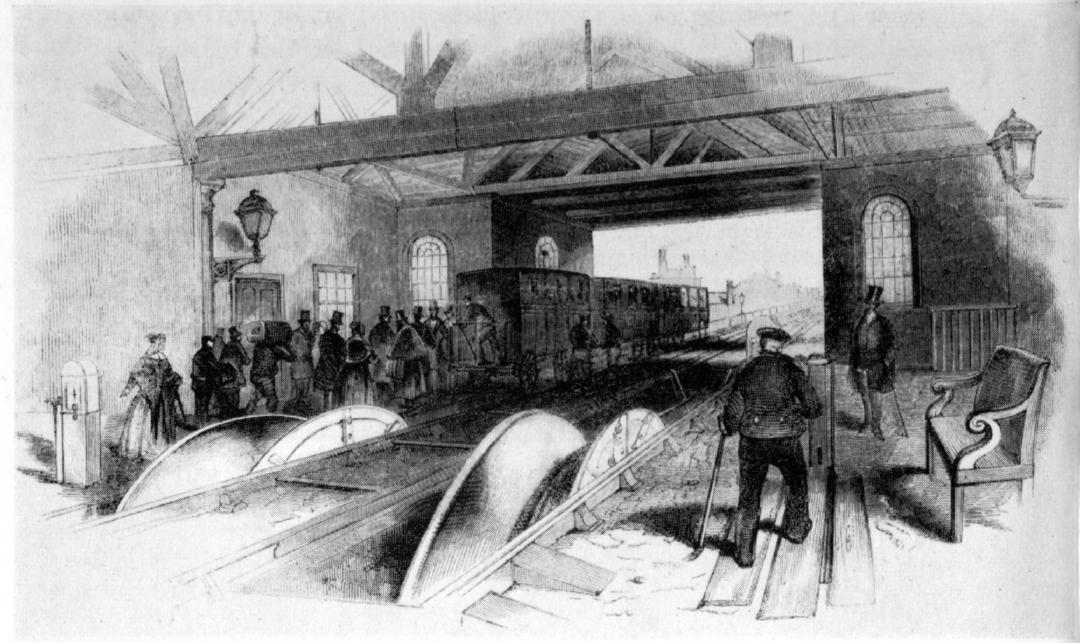
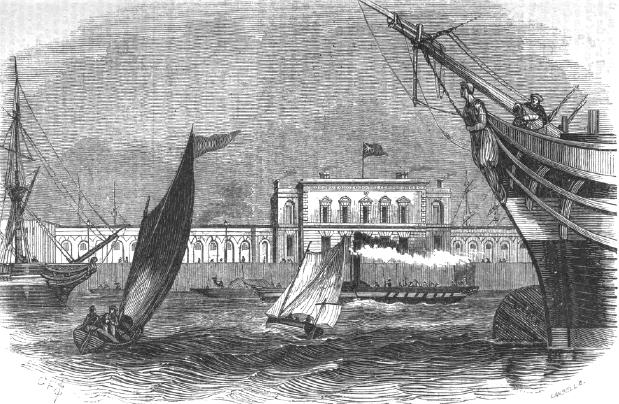
- Minories Blackwall and Brunswick Wharf

Overview
- Status: Part of London, Tilbury and Southend line and Docklands Light Railway
- Owner: London and Blackwall Railway and successors
- Locale: London, England
- Stations: 12 (as at 3 May 1926)

Service
- Type: Commuter rail and goods
- Services: London–Blackwall; London–Bow; London–North Greenwich

History
- Opened: 6 July 1840

Technical
- Number of tracks: 2
- Character: Elevated
- Track gauge: 5 ft 1/2 in (1,537 mm) changed to 4 ft 8 1/2 in (1,435 mm) standard gauge

The London and Blackwall Railway (LBR) was a railway elevated on a brick viaduct in the East End of London, England. Prior to opening, it was known as the Commercial Railway in reference to the route of the Commercial Road that it followed. It opened for passenger service on 6 July 1840. Trains initially ran from Blackwall on the River Thames to Minories just outside the City of London. An extension to a new terminus at Fenchurch Street, authorised prior to the line opening, was completed on 2 August 1841. With stationary engines at either end of the line, the railway was an early pioneer of cable-haulage and of syncronised operation using the Cooke and Wheatstone telegraph. Goods service started on 5 April 1842.

It was converted to steam locomotive use in 1849, to enable connection to other railways. A branch from Stepney to Bow was opened on 2 April 1849. The LBR system was used by services of the North London Railway (NLR) from 28 September 1850 and the London, Tilbury and Southend Railway (LTSR) from 13 April 1854. The LBR was leased to the Great Eastern Railway (GER) from 1 January 1866. A branch from Poplar was opened to Millwall Docks on 18 December 1871 and to North Greenwich on 29 July 1872. Service east of Stepney to Blackwall and North Greenwich was withdrawn on 4 May 1926. The railway now forms part of the London, Tilbury and Southend line and the Docklands Light Railway.

== History ==
=== Origins ===
Plans for a railway to connect Blackwall with Central London were being developed in 1825. The scheme to run a route along the Commercial Road, pulled by horses or a stationary engine, failed to receive parliamentary approval in 1828. By the 1830s, there were two rival schemes to build a similar railway. The Commercial Railway was the southerly route on a brick viaduct, much like the London and Greenwich Railway. The London and Blackwall Railway and Steam Navigation Depot was the northerly route in cutting. Both schemes envisaged a terminus at Leadenhall Street in the City of London, that was resisted by the city authorities.

George and Robert Stephenson were associated with both schemes. They surveyed the southerly route before switching allegiance to support the northern scheme. John Rennie remained as consulting engineer on the southern route. It was the southern route, with a terminus permitted outside of the City of London at Minories, that was authorised on 28 July 1836. The company was unable to raise the required capital to build the scheme. The two former rival companies combined, with the Stephensons and Rennie giving way to William Cubitt as the engineer. In 1839, the Commercial Railway was renamed the London and Blackwall Railway.

=== Initial system ===
The 3 1/4 miles (5.2 km) railway between Minories and Blackwall, with intermediate stations at Limehouse, West India Docks and Poplar, opened on 6 July 1840. The two lines were bidirectional, with the second line opening on 3 August 1840. Stepney opened as an intermediate station on 3 August 1840 and Shadwell opened on 1 October 1840. First and second class accommodation was provided. Seats were not thought necessary in second class because of the short journey times. In 1839, prior to opening, a short 450 yards (0.41 km) extension to Fenchurch Street in the City of London was authorised. It opened to passengers on 2 August 1841. Minories was adapted to operate as a through station. Sunday service commenced in 1842. On 5 April 1842, the line was opened for goods traffic. Cannon Street Road was added as an infill station on 21 August 1842. The railway was not a financial success. In 1848 the process of converting the railway from 5 ft 1/2 in (1,537 mm) to 4 ft 8 1/2 in (1,435 mm) standard gauge commenced, with the northern track taken out of use. Cannon Street Road station was closed in November 1848. (Note: Borley gives the closure date as November or December 1848. Butt gives the closure date as November 1848.) The last cable-hauled service ran on 14 February 1849. Minories station was closed from 14 February to 9 September 1849.

=== Expansion and connections ===
An extension to Bow, authorised as the London and Blackwall Extension Railway (LBER), opened on 2 April 1849. This was intended to connect to the Eastern Counties Railway (ECR), but instead terminated at the Victoria Park and Bow interchange station, with an intermediate station at Bow and Bromley. The service was not a success and was withdrawn on 26 September 1850. Bow and Bromley station was closed. From 28 September 1850, the LBR and LBER were used by the North London Railway (NLR) (Note: The NLR was known as the East and West India Docks and Birmingham Junction Railway until 1 January 1853.) to access the terminus at Fenchurch Street from a junction at Bow. The NLR station at Bow effectively replaced Bow and Bromley. In 1852, another junction was constructed between the LBR and NLR at Poplar for freight use. Fenchurch Street station was enlarged and rebuilt with four platforms in 1853. From 13 April 1854, the LBR and LBER were used by the London, Tilbury and Southend Railway (LTSR) to access Fenchurch Street and the junction with the ECR was finally installed for this purpose. The ECR started using this route for suburban services from 1854, beginning with the North Woolwich route. (Note: Fenchurch Street was more conveniently located than the ECR's Bishopsgate terminus.) The line between Fenchurch Street and Stepney was widened to three tracks, adding an additional up line, in 1862.

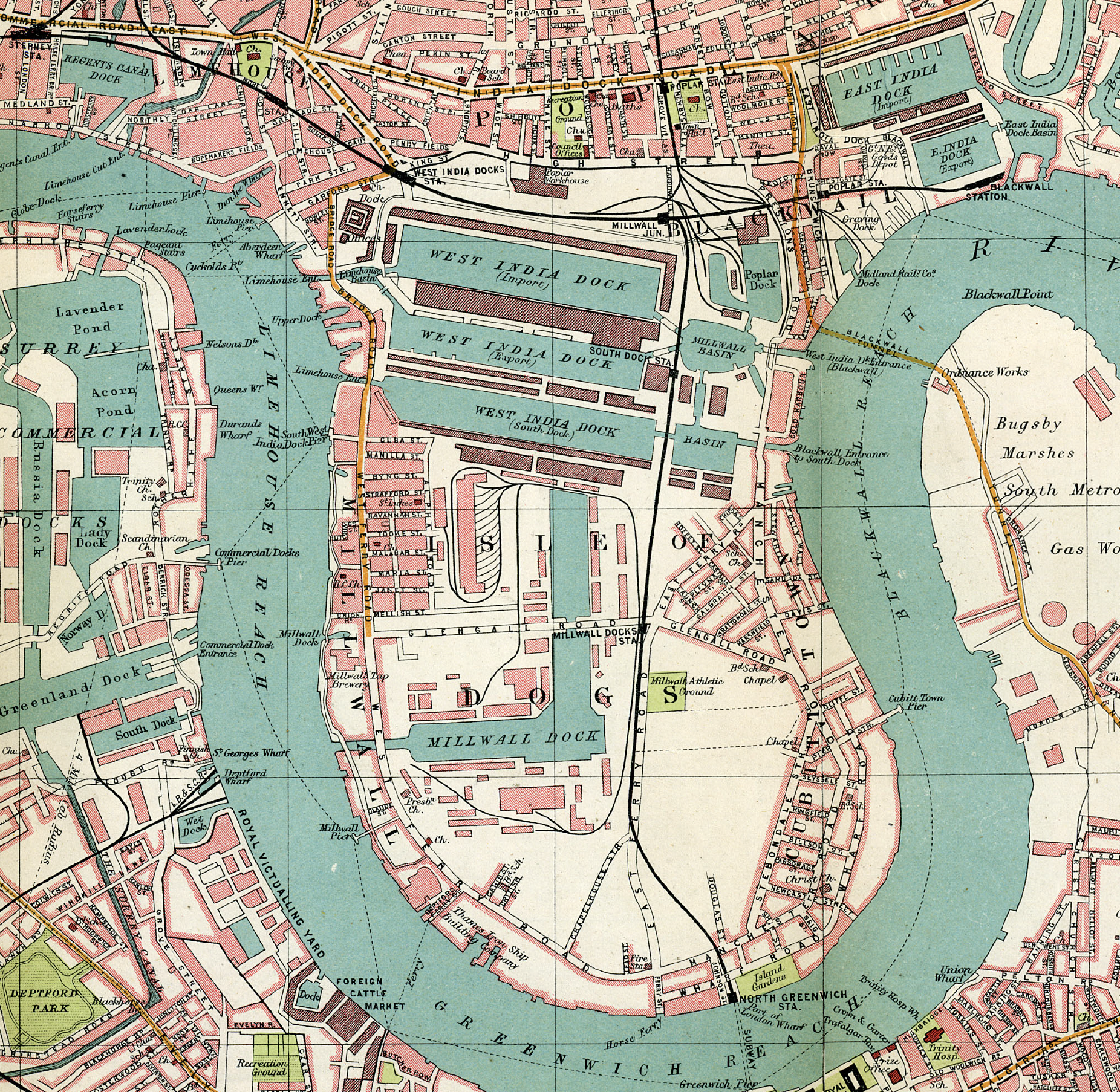
London and Blackwall system east of Stepney in 1908

From 1 November 1865, the NLR started using Broad Street as their main terminus, although still provided some services to Fenchurch Street. (Note: NLR ran a Fenchurch Street–Broad Street service until 1 August 1866 and then a Fenchurch Street–Bow service until 1 January 1869.) The LBR system was leased to the Great Eastern Railway (GER) in perpetuity from 1 January 1866. (Note: The lease was for 999 years.) From 1 January 1869 the GER ran a service between Fenchurch Street and Bow that had previously been provided by NLR. From 1 September 1870, the NLR extended some services from Poplar to Blackwall, using the 1852 junction with relaid track. Burdett Road station, in Mile End, was added on the LBER on 11 September 1871. A new station called Bow Road was opened on the site of the former Bow and Bromley station on 1 October 1876. Leman Street station, on the LBR in Whitechapel, was opened on 1 June 1877.

Authorised prior to the GER takeover, the Millwall Extension Railway (MER) was a 1 1/2 miles (2.4 km) single-track extension south through the Isle of Dogs that opened on 18 December 1871. Stations were provided at South Dock and Millwall Docks, with an interchange station at Millwall Junction on the original London–Blackwall route. There was a passing loop at South Dock. The branch passed through land owned by the Millwall Dock Company and the East and West India Dock Company and was operated by the companies within their property. The line was completed to North Greenwich, on the north bank of the Thames, on 29 July 1872. A passenger ferry, taken over by the LBR in 1874, was provided to connect passengers with Greenwich. The line between Fenchurch Street and Stepney was widened to four tracks, adding an additional down line, in 1893.

=== Closure and incorporation into other railways ===
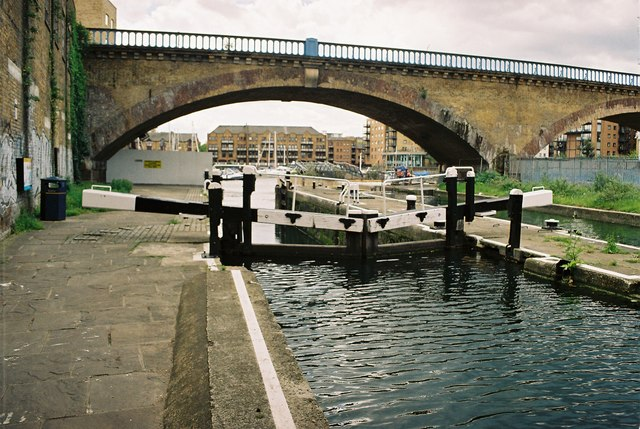
Brick viaduct built for the LBR and now used by the DLR

In the early 20th century the LBR system suffered from a drop in passengers. The opening of the Greenwich foot tunnel for dock workers and the relocation of Millwall Football Club reduced patronage on the Millwall branch. Sunday service was withdrawn on the Blackwall branch on 4 October 1908 and on the Millwall branch on 28 December 1913. Leman Street and Shadwell stations suffered competition from buses and were temporarily closed during the First World War. Betjeman, writing of this period, notes the condition of the line.

Those frequent and quite empty trains of the Blackwall Railway ran from a special platform at Fenchurch Street. I remember them well. Like stage coaches they rumbled slowly past East-End chimney pots, wharves and shipping, stopping at empty black stations, till they came to a final halt at Blackwall. When one emerged there was nothing to see but a cobbled quay and a vast stretch of wind whipped water.

— John Betjeman, First and Last Loves (1952)

The LBR and GER were amalgamated with several other railways to create the London and North Eastern Railway (LNER) on 1 January 1923. Passenger service east of Stepney on the Blackwall and North Greenwich branches were withdrawn on 4 May 1926 and eight stations were closed. (Note: The eight stations closed on 4 May 1926 were Blackwall, Limehouse, Millwall Docks, Millwall Junction, North Greenwich, Poplar, South Dock and West India Docks.) During the Second World War, passenger services were withdrawn at Burdett Road on 10 April 1941 and at Bow Road on 21 April 1941. Leman Street and Shadwell stations closed permanently on 7 July 1941. Bow Road station was reopened on 9 December 1946.

The line became part of British Railways on 1 January 1948, as part of the Eastern Region. On 20 February 1949, the former LTSR route east of Bow was transferred to the same region. The LBR local tracks and LBER were overhead electrified in 1949 for a Fenchurch Street–Bow Road–Stratford service, but were not brought into regular passenger service. Regular services via Bow Road ceased on 7 November 1949 and the station was closed. The London, Tilbury and Southend line became the only service to use the route into Fenchurch Street. Sections of abandoned LBR and MER viaduct were later reused for the Docklands Light Railway system that opened on 31 August 1987.

== Traction system ==
The railway was built to use cable haulage. Each track had a double length of hemp rope supplied by the Limehouse company Joseph Huddart & Co, with metal swivels inserted at intervals to resist entanglements. Pairs of engines were located at Minories and Blackwall. Eight steam engines were provided by Maudslay, Sons and Field, with four in use and four in maintenance. The Minories winding house had four at 110 horsepower (82 kW) but the engines at Blackwall were only at 75 horsepower (56 kW) as the overall gradient of the line fell from west to east. When the extension to Fenchurch Street was brought into use, departing carriages were allowed to roll into Minories station under gravity.

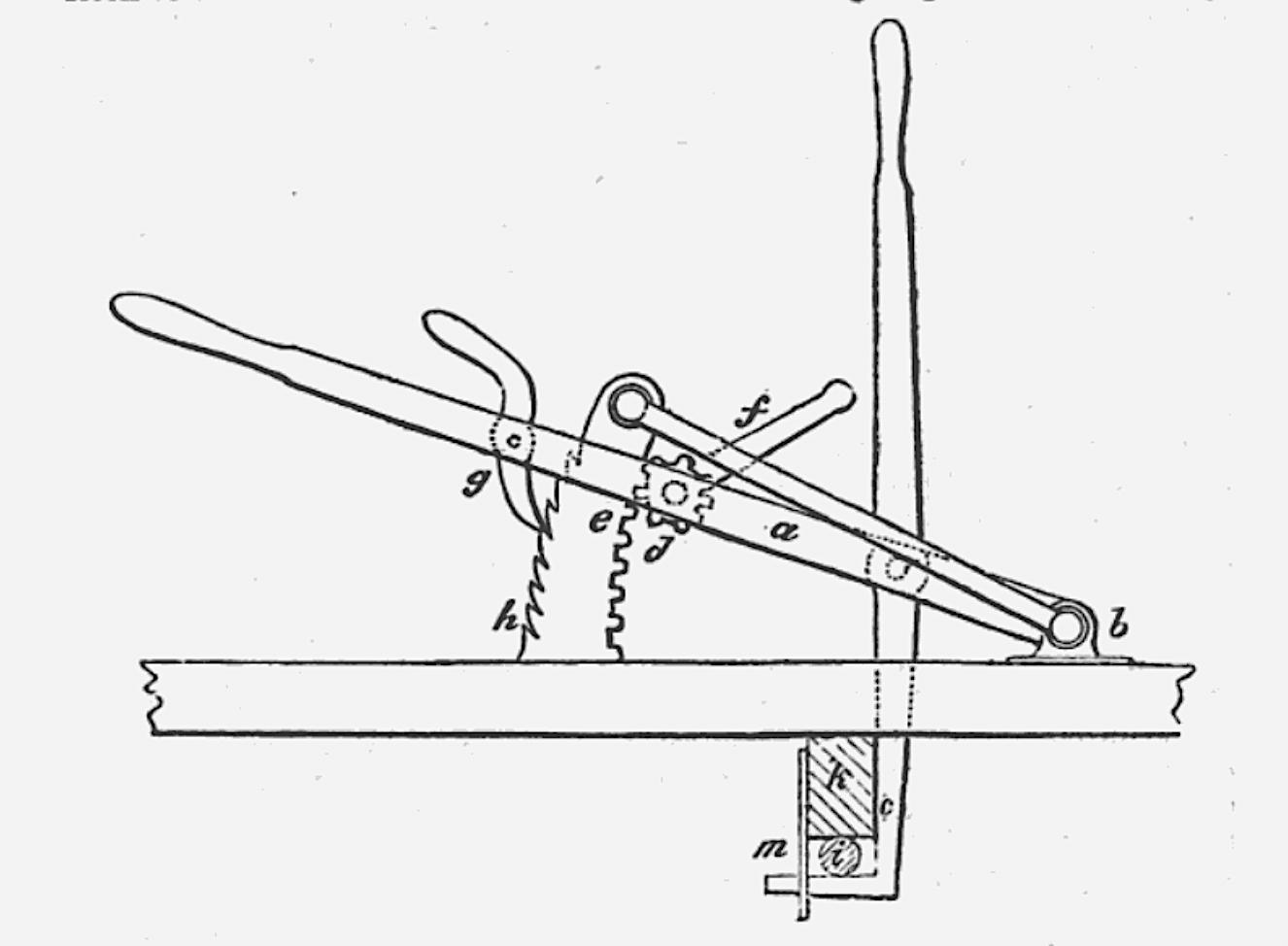
Rope grips were in each carriage

With cable-haulage, the trains were unable to pause at intermediate stations. In order to serve stations between the terminals, carriages were slipped or joined the cable separately to the main formation. This meant it was not possible to travel directly between two intermediate stations. The LBR experimented with various modes of operation. One method involved five carriages from Fenchurch Street, joined by a single carriage at Minories. Single carriages at Shadwell and Stepnery joined the rope at the same time and travelled individually. Single carriages were slipped at Stepney, Limehouse, West India Docks and Poplar. This was reversed in the other direction. Another pattern saw seven carriages start at the terminus. Formations varied to meet demand. Synchronised operation of the system relied on the innovative use of the Cooke and Wheatstone telegraph.

Conversion to an atmospheric railway was considered in 1844 but was not progressed further. The railway was subsequently converted to steam locomotive use in 1849. The dock companies would not permit steam locomotives to operate through their property and services on the Millwall branch were initially horse-drawn for part of the route. Steam locomotive working over the entire branch commenced on 23 August 1880.

== List of stations ==
The stations, from west to east, were:

Station	Opened	Closed	Notes	References
London and Blackwall Railway
Fenchurch Street	2 August 1841	—N/a		
Minories	6 July 1840	24 October 1853	Temporarily closed 15 February to 9 September 1849	
Leman Street	1 June 1877	7 July 1941	Temporarily closed 22 May 1916 to 1 July 1919	
Cannon Street Road	21 August 1842	November 1848		
Shadwell	1 October 1840	7 July 1941	Renamed Shadwell and St George's East on 1 July 1900; Temporarily closed 22 May 1916 to 1 July 1919	
Stepney	3 August 1840	—N/a	Renamed Stepney East on 1 July 1923; Renamed Limehouse on 11 May 1987	
Limehouse	6 July 1840	4 May 1926		
West India Docks	6 July 1840	4 May 1926		
Millwall Junction	18 December 1871	4 May 1926		
Poplar	6 July 1840	4 May 1926	Resited in 1840	
Blackwall	6 July 1840	4 May 1926		
London and Blackwall Extension Railway
Burdett Road	11 September 1871	10 April 1941		
Bow and Bromley	2 April 1849	26 September 1850	Also known as Old Ford	
Bow Road	1 October 1876	7 November 1949	Resited on 4 April 1892; Temporarily closed 21 April 1941 to 9 December 1946; Temporarily closed 6 January 1947 to 6 October 1947	
Victoria Park and Bow	2 April 1849	6 January 1851	Last served by LBR on 26 September 1850	
Millwall Extension Railway
South Dock	18 December 1871	4 May 1926	Renamed South West India Dock in July 1881; Renamed South Dock in May 1895	
Millwall Docks	18 December 1871	4 May 1926		
North Greenwich	29 July 1872	4 May 1926	Also known as North Greenwich (Cubitt Town)	

== List of enabling legislation ==
The building of the railway was authorised by the following:

Short title	Regnal year and chapter	Date
Commercial Railway Act 1836	6 & 7 Will. 4. c. cxxiii	28 July 1836
Commercial Railway Act 1839	2 & 3 Vict. c. xcv	17 August 1839
London and Blackwall Railway Act 1842	5 & 6 Vict. c. xxxiv	31 May 1842
London and Blackwall Railway Act 1846	9 & 10 Vict. c. cclxxiii	27 July 1846
London and Blackwall Railway (Improvement and Branches to St. Katharine's and London Docks) Act 1848	11 & 12 Vict. c. xc	22 July 1848
London and Blackwall Railway Amendment Act 1848	11 & 12 Vict. c. cxi	25 July 1848
London and Blackwall Railway Amendment and Extension of Time Act 1849	12 & 13 Vict. c. lxxiii	28 July 1849
London and Blackwall Railway Act 1850	13 & 14 Vict. c. xxx	25 June 1850
London and Blackwall Railway (Branch to Haydon Square) Act 1851	14 & 15 Vict. c. xxviii	5 June 1851
London and Blackwall Railway Lease Act 1865	28 & 29 Vict. c. c	19 June 1865
London, Blackwall and Millwall Extension Railway Act 1865	28 & 29 Vict. c. cxvi	19 June 1865
London, Blackwall and Millwall Extension Railway Act 1868	31 & 32 Vict. c. cxx	13 July 1868
London, Blackwall and Millwall Extension Railway Act 1870	33 & 34 Vict. c. lxii	20 June 1870
London and Blackwall Railway (Steamboats) Act 1873	36 & 37 Vict. c. cxci	21 July 1873
London and Blackwall Railway Act 1873	36 & 37 Vict. c. clxiii	21 July 1873
London and Blackwall Railway Act 1874	37 & 38 Vict. c. xxxix	30 June 1874
London and Blackwall Railway Act 1885	48 & 49 Vict. c. cxiv	22 July 1885
London and Blackwall Railway Act 1888	51 & 52 Vict. c. lxviii	28 June 1888
London and Blackwall Railway Act 1893	56 & 57 Vict. c. ix	29 April 1893
