= Limehouse railway station (1840–1926) =

Former railway station in England

Limehouse

General information
- Location: Limehouse, Tower Hamlets
- Coordinates: 51.5106°N 0.0297°W
- Platforms: 2

Other information
- Status: Disused

History
- Opened: 6 July 1840
- Closed: 3 May 1926
- Original company: London and Blackwall Railway
- Pre-grouping: Great Eastern Railway
- Post-grouping: London and North Eastern Railway
Location
- Location in Tower Hamlets

Limehouse was a railway station in Limehouse, London, on the London and Blackwall Railway (LBR).

== History ==
It was opened on 6 July 1840. It was closed on 4 May 1926. The line continued to carry freight to the Isle of Dogs until the 1960s.

== Design ==
The platforms at Limehouse were demolished soon after closure but the ground-level station buildings still survive to this day beneath the viaduct. In the 1980s the viaduct it stood on was reused for the City branch of the Docklands Light Railway (DLR).

== Location ==
It was located at the junction of Bate Street and Three Colt Street, between Stepney station (which after several renamings is the current Limehouse station) and West India Docks station. The present-day Westferry DLR station stands 200 yards to the east of its site.

Preceding station	Disused railways	Following station
Stepney; Line closed, station open	Great Eastern Railway; London and Blackwall Railway	West India Docks; Line and station closed
