= Limehouse Blues =

Limehouse Blues may refer to:

- "Limehouse Blues" (song), a jazz standard
- Limehouse Blues (film), a 1934 film named after the song
