= Blackwall railway station =

Former railway station in Tower Hamlets, London

Blackwall
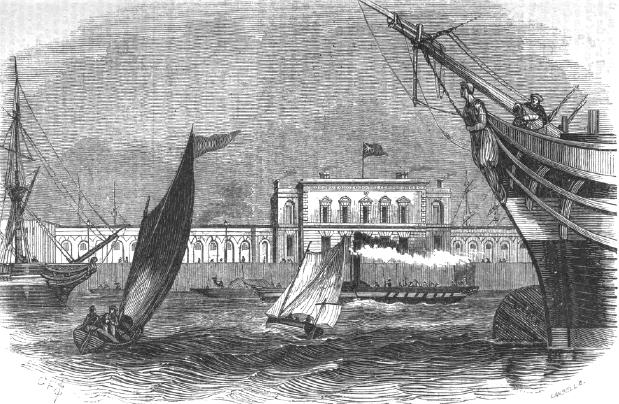
- Image from a newspaper article on the opening of the railway

General information
- Location: East India Docks, Tower Hamlets
- Coordinates: 51.50817°N 0.00°E
- Platforms: 2

Other information
- Status: Disused

History
- Opened: 6 July 1840
- Closed: 4 May 1926
- Original company: London and Blackwall Railway
- Pre-grouping: Great Eastern Railway
- Post-grouping: London and North Eastern Railway
Location
- Location in Tower Hamlets

Blackwall was a railway station in Blackwall, London, that served as the eastern terminus of the London and Blackwall Railway.

== History ==
It opened on 6 July 1840 with services connecting with a ferry service to Gravesend, Kent.

Between 1870 and 1890 the station was also served by some North London Railway trains from Broad Street via Hackney and Bow services to connect to the ferry services. The station was renovated at this time.

In March 1926 the London and North Eastern Railway and Port of London Authority announced passenger services would be withdrawn on 30 June 1926. However, with the start of the national general strike services were suspended early on 3 May 1926, and never resumed.

Betjeman, writing of the period before closure, notes the condition of the line and station.

Those frequent and quite empty trains of the Blackwall Railway ran from a special platform at Fenchurch Street. I remember them well. Like stage coaches they rumbled slowly past East-End chimney pots, wharves and shipping, stopping at empty black stations, till they came to a final halt at Blackwall. When one emerged there was nothing to see but a cobbled quay and a vast stretch of wind whipped water.

— John Betjeman, First and Last Loves (1952)

The station was demolished in 1946 to make way for Blackwall power station, although the branch continued to carry goods traffic until the demise of the docks in the late 1960s.

== Design ==
The station was designed by architect William Tite in an ornate Italianate style. Today no trace of the two-storey station remains, and the docks have been filled in (although a small basin remains).

== Location ==
It was located on the south side of the East India Docks, near the shore of the River Thames, 3 miles 43 chains (5.7 km) down-line from the western terminus at Fenchurch Street. Its approximate location is now occupied by houses on Jamestown Way. The station site is some distance from the present-day Blackwall DLR station; the closest existing station is actually East India DLR station, which is slightly to the north-west of the original Blackwall station site.

Preceding station	Disused railways	Following station
Poplar; Line and station closed	Great Eastern Railway; London and Blackwall Railway	Terminus
