= Minories railway station =

Former railway station in England

Minories
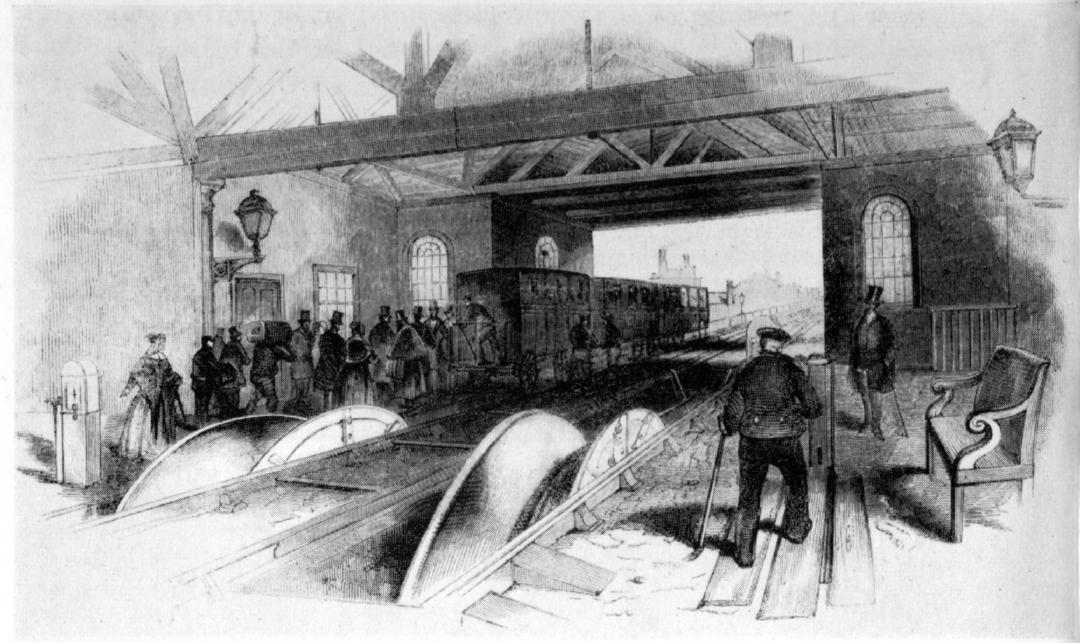
- Station and winding gear, c. 1840

General information
- Location: St Botolph without Aldgate
- Coordinates: 51.5108°N 0.0749°W
- Platforms: 2

Other information
- Status: Disused

History
- Opened: 6 July 1840
- Closed: 24 October 1853
- Original company: London and Blackwall Railway
Location
- Location in the City of London

Minories was the initial western terminus of the London and Blackwall Railway (LBR). It was located in the parish of St Botolph without Aldgate, to the northeast of the Tower of London. The LBR had hoped to build a terminus in the City of London and received authorisation to extend the railway before Minories was opened. It was converted to a through station in 1841 and closed permanently in 1853. A boundary change in 1994 brought the former station site within the City of London.

== History ==
Minories station opened on 6 July 1840, as the western terminus of the London and Blackwall Railway. The line was operated on a cable-hauled basis with a 400 hp pair of stationary steam engines at Blackwall and Minories winding a cable 7 miles (11 km) long, to which the trains were attached on the cable car principle. The two lines were bidirectional, with the second line opening on 3 August 1840.

The promoters of the railway had hoped to build a terminus at Leadenhall Street in the City of London, but it was resisted by the city authorities and a terminus near Minories was authorised by the British Parliament. In 1839, prior to opening of the railway, a short extension from Minories to Fenchurch Street in the City of London was authorised. Fenchurch Street opened to passengers on 2 August 1841. Minories was adapted to operate as a through station.

Sunday service commenced in 1842. The station was closed following the last cable-hauled service on 14 February 1849. It reopened on 9 September 1849 and was closed permanently on 24 October 1853.

== Design ==
The station was built with a temporary roof, as the extension to Fenchurch Street was anticipated.

The station was later converted into goods sidings, and the lower levels of the old station were converted into the Mint Street Goods Depot. The depot remained open until April 1951 and demolition came shortly afterward.

== Location ==
It was located in the parish of St Botolph without Aldgate, on the east side of Minories, northeast of the Tower of London. The location of the station and winching houses are marked by the Minories public house. The western terminus of the Docklands Light Railway opened at Tower Gateway, just to the south of the site of Minories station, in August 1987. A boundary change on 1 April 1994 brought the former station site within the City of London.

== Notes ==
Preceding station	Disused railways	Following station
Fenchurch Street	London and Blackwall Railway	Leman Street
