= Millwall Docks railway station =

Former railway station in England

Millwall Docks
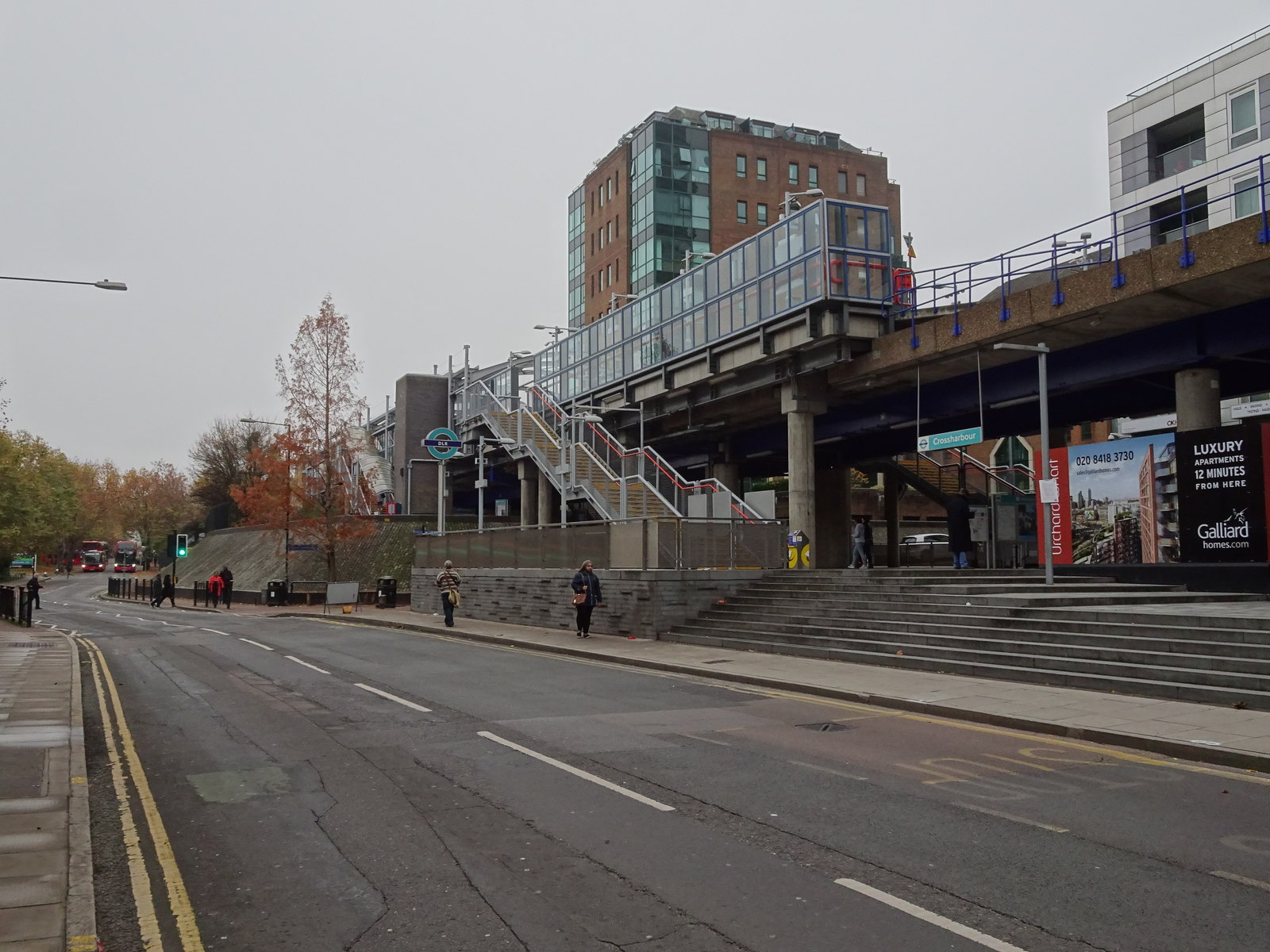
- Former station site in 2018

General information
- Location: Millwall, Tower Hamlets
- Coordinates: 51.4959°N 0.0144°W
- Platforms: 1

Other information
- Status: Disused

History
- Opened: 18 December 1871
- Closed: 4 May 1926
- Pre-grouping: Great Eastern Railway
- Post-grouping: London and North Eastern Railway
Location
- Location in Tower Hamlets

Millwall Docks was a railway station located in the Millwall area of the Isle of Dogs in east London.

== History ==
It opened on 18 December 1871. Passenger usage of the station was always light, and it closed to services in May 1926, along with the rest of the MER extension, though goods services continued until the demise of the docks in the 1970s.

== Location ==
It was between South Dock and North Greenwich stations on the Millwall Extension Railway (MER) branch of the London and Blackwall Railway (LBR). It was situated on the corner of Glengall Road (now Pepper Street) and East Ferry Road, serving the Millwall Docks (which were later merged into a single dock, rendering the name slightly anachronistic).

The derelict Port of London area was heavily redeveloped in the 1980s, and most of the Docklands Light Railway (DLR) between Island Gardens and South Quay reused the old MER route through the docks. The present-day Crossharbour DLR station is located on the site of Millwall Docks station.

Preceding station	Disused railways	Following station
South Dock; Line and station closed	Great Eastern Railway; London and Blackwall Railway	North Greenwich; Line and station closed
