= Limehouse station =

Docklands Light Railway and National Rail station

Limehouse
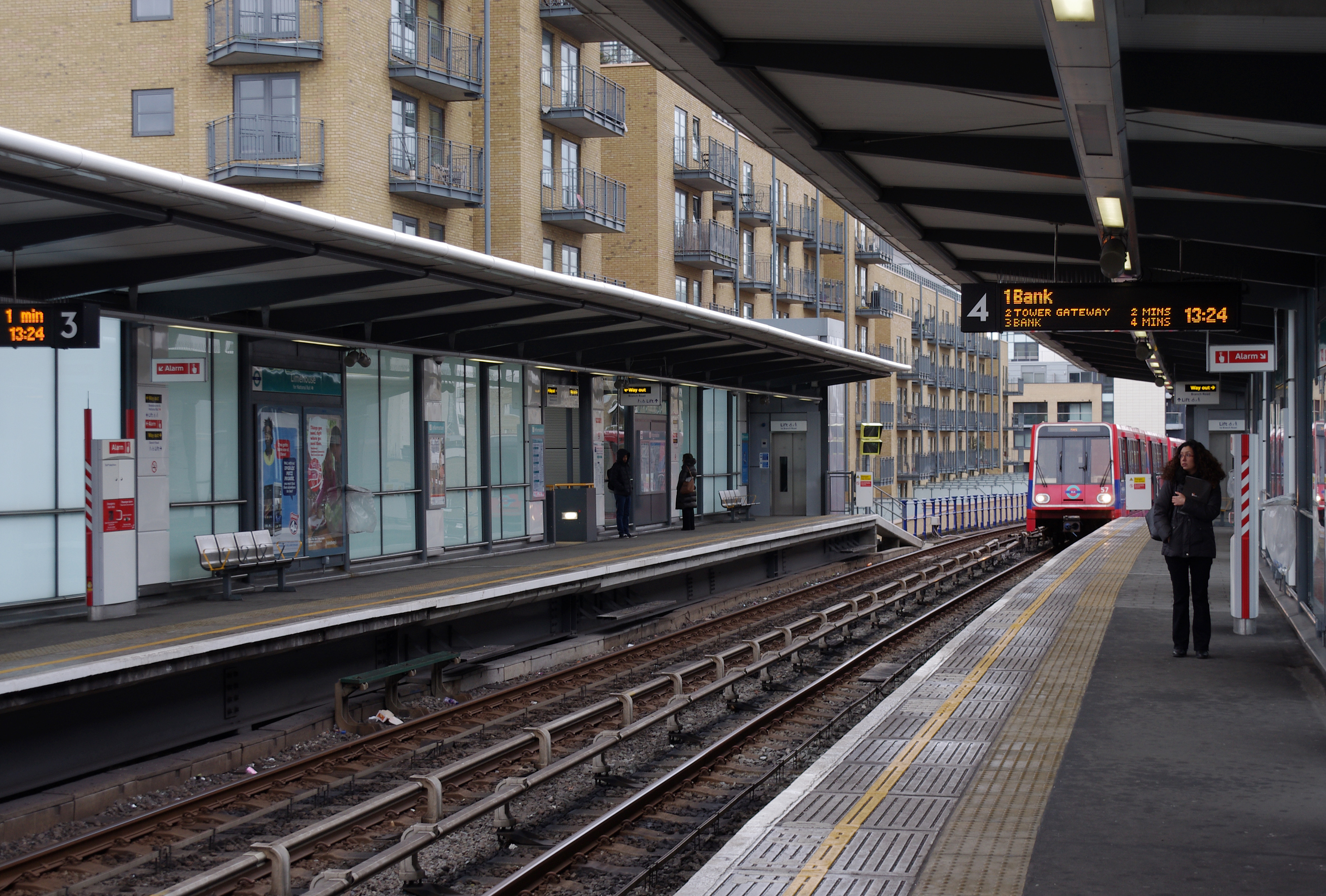
- The Docklands Light Railway platforms at Limehouse, 2013
- Interactive map of Limehouse

General information
- Location: Limehouse
- Local authority: London Borough of Tower Hamlets
- Managed by: c2c Docklands Light Railway
- Owners: Network Rail; Transport for London
- Station code: LHS
- DfT category: E
- Number of platforms: 4
- Accessible: Yes
- Fare zone: 2

DLR annual boardings and alightings
- 2021: ▲4.799 million
- 2022: ▲7.330 million
- 2023: ▲8.540 million
- 2024: ▼5.84 million
- 2025: ▲7.14 million

National Rail annual entry and exit
- 2020–21: ▼1.045 million
- 2021–22: ▲1.840 million
- 2022–23: ▲2.440 million
- 2023–24: ▲2.475 million
- 2024–25: ▲2.560 million

Railway companies
- Original company: Commercial Railway
- Pre-grouping: Great Eastern Railway
- Post-grouping: London and North Eastern Railway

Key dates
- 6 July 1840: Opened as Stepney by LBR
- 28 September 1850: LBER platforms opened (Note: London and Blackwall Extension Railway)
- 1 July 1923: Renamed Stepney East
- 3 May 1926: LBR platforms closed
- 11 May 1987: Renamed Limehouse
- 31 August 1987: DLR platforms opened

Other information
- External links: Departures; Facilities
- Coordinates: 51.5124°N 0.0397°W

Limehouse is a National Rail and connected Docklands Light Railway (DLR) station in Limehouse, London, England. It is served by regional services operated by c2c to and from Fenchurch Street and by light metro services provided by the DLR to and from Tower Gateway or Bank. On the main line, Limehouse is located 1 mile 58 chains (2.8 km) from Fenchurch Street and the following station is West Ham; on the DLR it is between Shadwell and Westferry in London fare zone 2.

The station was opened by the Commercial Railway (later the London and Blackwall Railway) in 1840 with the name Stepney. At that time, the Commercial Railway had a separate station named Limehouse one stop to the east. Stepney was renamed Stepney East in 1923, and in 1926 the other Limehouse station was closed. Stepney East adopted the current Limehouse name in 1987, just before the DLR opened.

== History ==
=== Early history (1840–1866) ===
The station was opened on 6 July 1840 by the Commercial Railway, located in the parish of Stepney within the hamlet of Ratcliff. It was named Stepney, lying between Shadwell and a separate station called Limehouse, located within the Limehouse parish. The initial train service operated between a temporary terminus at Minories and Blackwall until 2 August 1841 when Fenchurch Street opened; the Commercial Railway was then renamed the London and Blackwall Railway (LBR). The service was a rope-powered operation and it was not until 15 February 1849 that steam operation commenced.

On 28 September 1850 an extension was opened from Stepney to Bow, to join the LBR with the Eastern Counties Railway (ECR). Increasing congestion on the approaches to Fenchurch Street saw a third line proposed between Fenchurch Street and a junction at George Street (now called Boulcott Street). Discussions about a replacement started in 1853 but it was not until 1 April 1856 that plans were agreed by the LBR board. In the meantime the London, Tilbury and Southend Railway (LTSR) was opened in 1854 operating trains via Stratford railway station to Fenchurch Street. The replacement (existing) station was constructed with a set of platforms (the present-day platforms 1 and 2) to serve the Bow route (as it was then) whilst two further platforms were constructed for the Blackwall line (the Docklands Light Railway platforms occupy this site). It opened on 30 March 1856.

In 1858 LTSR trains started operating on the direct route from Barking rather than via the congested Stratford route. Twenty people were injured in a minor collision at the station on 22 November 1861. A Board of Trade report found a signaller's error the primary cause of the incident.

=== Great Eastern Railway ownership (1866–1922) ===
In 1866 the Great Eastern Railway (GER) took over the LBR on a long-lease and instigated a series of repairs and in 1869 provided improved signalling arrangements with a new signal box and interlocked signals and block working between adjacent signal boxes.

On 9 April 1871 a train from Bow ran through a signal and hit a Blackwall to Fenchurch Street train with the last coach being knocked off the viaduct and landing on a building below. A further accident in 1879 saw the Board of Trade inspector recommend the re-siting of the signal box which was duly provided in 1880. With a frequent train service however Stepney was again the site of an accident in 1874 with 106 injuries, in 1889 where a LTSR locomotive derailed, and in 1892 where another LTSR locomotive was derailed but this time was hit by a GER locomotive killing the LTSR driver.

An improved building was provided on the down Bow platform in 1894. In 1895 the fourth line towards Fenchurch Street was opened which helped reduce the number of conflicting moves between trains and thus the risk of accidents. The GER further improved the station in 1900.

The LTSR became part of the Midland Railway in 1912.

=== London & North Eastern Railway ownership (1923–1947) ===
On 1 January 1923 the Midland Railway became part of the London Midland & Scottish Railway (LMS) which took over operation of the services to Southend and Tilbury.

The GER became part of the London & North Eastern Railway on this date and the station was renamed Stepney East on 1 July 1923 to avoid confusion with the Stepney station in Yorkshire.

The LBR platforms were closed on 3 May 1926 as passenger services were withdrawn and all services were routed via the Bow platforms. A few goods trains used the Blackwall route but the LBR platforms were demolished in circa 1936 and the junction simplified. The signalling was improved at this time as part of a major re-signalling with colour light signals from Fenchurch Street to Gas Factory Junction (east of Stepney).

=== Railway nationalisation (1948–1994) ===
On 20 February 1949 the whole LTS line was transferred to the Eastern Region, yet despite the organisational changes, the old LTSR still was a distinctive system operated by former LTS and LMS locomotives until electrification.

The route to Stratford via Bow Road was electrified in 1949 and it was at that time that the former GER suburban services ceased operating leaving Stepney East served only by trains to the former LTSR destinations. No public electric trains ran however until the old LTSR system was electrified in 1961–62 with full electric services commencing on 17 June 1962.

The junction to the Blackwall line was removed in 1952 although a siding remained on the viaduct (accessible from the Blackwall end) for scrap metal traffic from Regent Dock which finished in the old Blackwall platforms.

Between 1982 and 1992 the station was operated by Network SouthEast, one of British Rail's three passenger business sectors, before being handed over to a business unit in preparation for privatisation.

The station's roof and canopy were destroyed during the Great storm of 1987.

=== Docklands Light Railway opens (1987) ===
On 31 August 1987 the Docklands Light Railway, which operated over the old LBR line, commenced operations, with new platforms (platforms 3 and 4) built on the site of the old LBR platforms; the station had been renamed Limehouse on 11 May that year.

The platforms were extended in 1991 to accommodate the DLR's new and longer two-carriage trains.

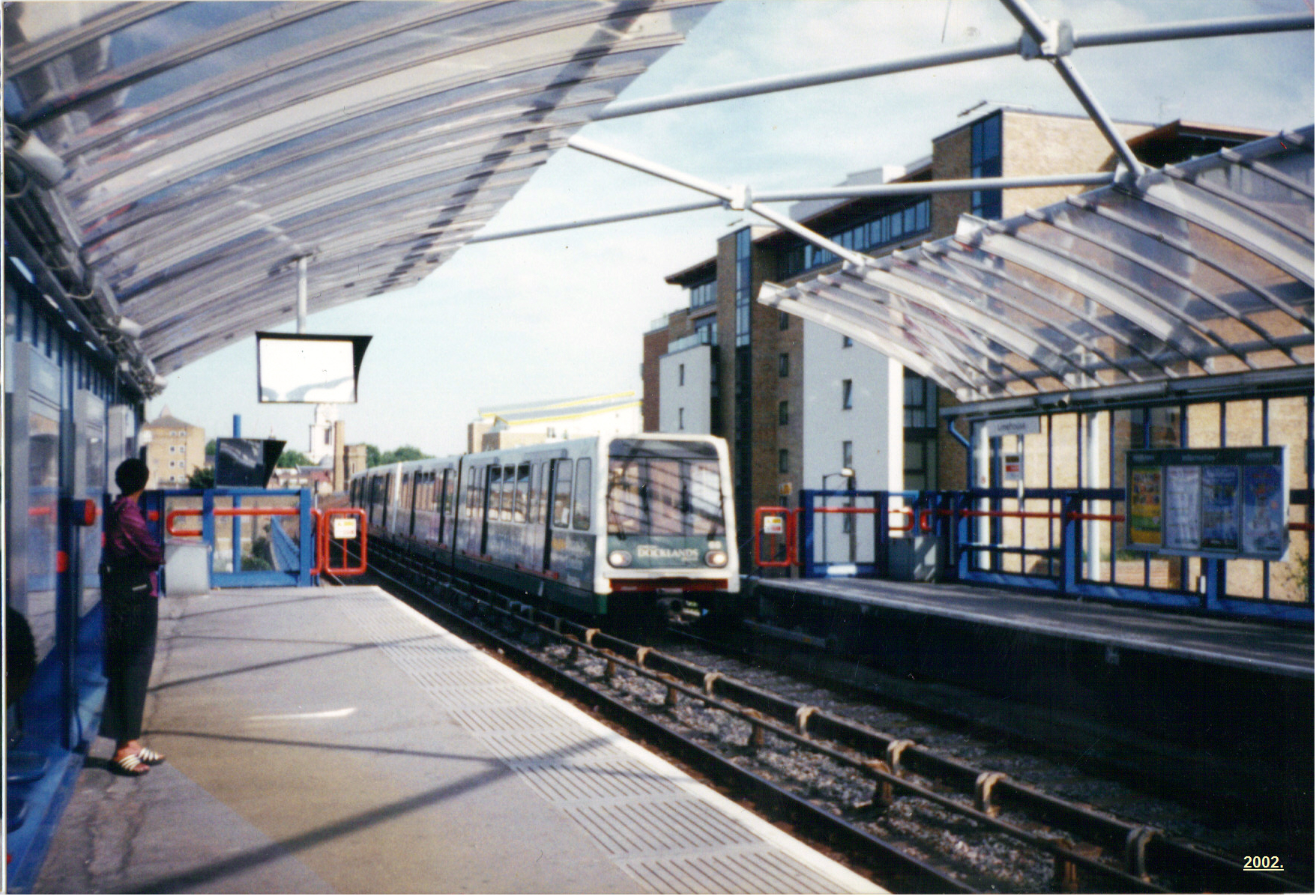
A DLR train arrives at Limehouse, 2002

=== Privatisation era (1994–2025) ===
In April 1994 Railtrack became responsible for the maintenance of the infrastructure at Limehouse station. Railtrack was succeeded by Network Rail in 2002.

In May 1996 the franchise for the London, Tilbury and Southend line was awarded to Prism Rail by the Director of Passenger Rail Franchising for a 15-year period with an average annual subsidy of £18.4 million. It began operating as LTS Rail on 26 May 1996. Prism was bought out by National Express who named the franchise c2c in 2003 and continue to operate the station.

Since the opening of the DLR, Limehouse has become a well-used interchange for Essex and east London commuters who work in the Canary Wharf financial estate, but the two viaducts remained separate, resulting in an awkward interchange between the DLR platforms and the National Rail platforms, as passengers had to pass down and then up flights of stairs. To remedy this, at least in part, a bridge was built to connect the westbound (London-bound) main line platform with the adjacent eastbound (Canary Wharf-bound) DLR platform. It was originally due for completion by the end of 2008, but was finally opened in November 2009. At the same time as the bridge was being built, other improvements were made, including readying the station for three-carriage operations on the DLR and the construction of an additional eastern entrance, with lifts and stairways for platform access.

Private operation of the London, Tilbury and Southend line by Trenitalia c2c ceased on 20 July 2025, with the new publicly owned operator c2c taking over.

== Limehouse Curve ==
There was also a rail link on a curved viaduct to the east of the station known as the Limehouse Curve. This opened on 5 April 1880 and was generally used for goods trains heading towards London's docks. There was a short-lived passenger train service between Blackwall and Palace Gates (via Stratford and Seven Sisters) which operated from 1 September 1880 until 1 March 1881. Some special excursion trains also used the curve about this time running from Blackwall to Southend and Southminster on summer Sundays in 1890 and 1891.

The Limehouse Curve was last used on 5 November 1962; on 10 May 1963 it was officially abandoned.

== Design ==
Limehouse station is elevated on a pair of diverging viaducts, each carrying a pair of platforms – one pair for National Rail trains and one for the Docklands Light Railway. The National Rail platforms have one entrance accessed via a stairwell at the western end, while the DLR platforms have entrances at both the western and eastern ends, each equipped with stairwells and lifts. The westbound main line platform is connected to the eastbound DLR platform by a walkway bridge.

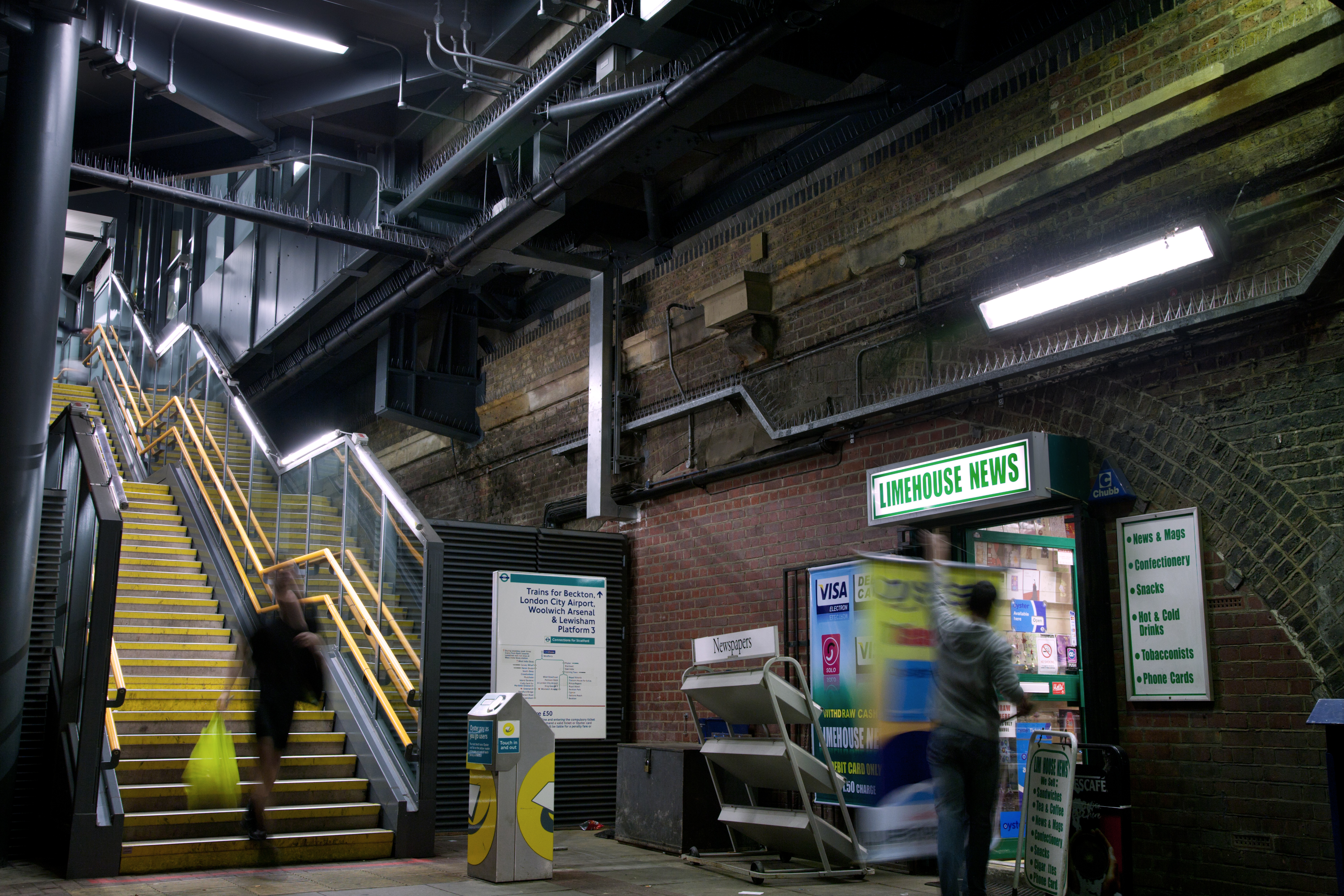
Inside Limehouse station

The station holds Secure Stations Scheme accreditation, and bicycle racks are provided underneath the DLR platforms by the western entrance. The ticket office is located within the station building under the main line platforms, and is managed by c2c; tickets can be retailed for National Rail services, the DLR and on Oyster card. Additional automatic ticket machines for DLR and Oyster cards are located under the DLR platforms at the foot of the stairways. There are automatic ticket barriers to the National Rail platforms, but not the DLR, meaning the bridge between the two sets of platforms has its own set of barriers.

== Location ==
London Buses routes 15, 115, 135, D3 and night routes N15, N550 and N551 serve the station.

== Services ==
=== National Rail ===
National Rail services at Limehouse are operated by c2c using Class 357 and 720 EMUs.

As of the June 2024 timetable the typical Monday to Friday off-peak service is:

- 8 tph (trains per hour) westbound to London Fenchurch Street
- 4 tph eastbound to Shoeburyness via Basildon (2 tph all stations and 2 tph semi-fast)
- 2 tph eastbound to Southend Central via Ockendon and Tilbury Town
- 2 tph eastbound to Grays via Rainham

Additional services call at the station during the peak hours.

=== DLR ===
The typical off-peak service in trains per hour from Limehouse is:

- 6 tph to Tower Gateway
- 18 tph to Bank
- 6 tph to Beckton
- 6 tph to Woolwich Arsenal
- 12 tph to Lewisham via Canary Wharf

Additional services call at the station during the peak hours, increasing the total service to up to 30 tph in each direction.

== Notes ==
Preceding station	National Rail	Following station
London Fenchurch Street	c2c London, Tilbury and Southend Line	West Ham
DLR
Shadwell towards Bank or Tower Gateway	Docklands Light Railway	Westferry towards Lewisham, Beckton or Woolwich Arsenal
	Historical railways	
Shadwell; Line open, station closed	Great Eastern Railway; London and Blackwall Railway	Burdett Road; Line open, station closed
Shadwell; Line open, station closed	Great Eastern Railway; London and Blackwall Railway	Limehouse; Line and station closed
