= Fenchurch Street railway station =

Railway terminus in the City of London, England

Fenchurch Street
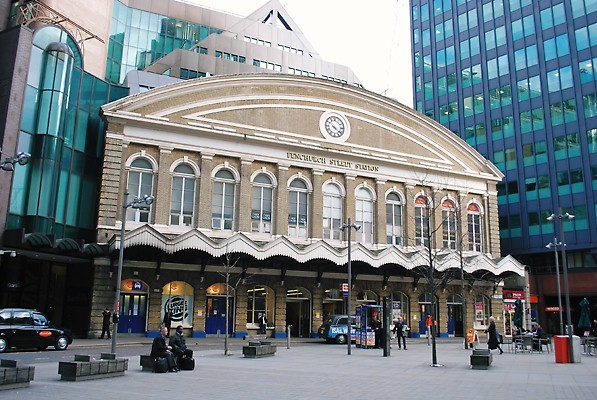
- Main entrance on Fenchurch Place

General information
- Other names: London Fenchurch Street
- Location: Fenchurch Place, City of London
- Coordinates: 51.51167°N 0.07881°W
- Owner: Network Rail
- Manager: c2c
- Platforms: 4
- Connections: Out-of-station interchanges: Aldgate; Bank-Monument; Liverpool Street; Tower Gateway; Tower Hill

Other information
- Station code: FST
- Fare zone: 1
- Classification: Category A
- Website: Official website

History
- Opened: 20 July 1841
- Original company: London and Blackwall Railway
- Pre-grouping: Great Eastern Railway
- Post-grouping: London and North Eastern Railway

Key dates
- 13 April 1854: Rebuilt
- 1935: Remodelled

Passengers

National Rail annual entry and exit
- 2021–22: ▲7.795 million
- 2022–23: ▲10.208 million
- 2023–24: ▲10.447 million
- 2024–25: ▲10.863 million
- 2025–26: ▲11.313 million

Listed Building – Grade II
- Official name: Front Block of Fenchurch Street Station
- Designated: 14 April 1972
- Reference no.: 1079149
Location
- Location in the City of London

Fenchurch Street, also known as London Fenchurch Street, is a central London railway terminus in the south-eastern corner of the City of London. It takes its name from its proximity to Fenchurch Street, a key thoroughfare in the City. The station and all trains are operated by c2c. Services run on lines built by the London and Blackwall Railway (L&BR) and the London, Tilbury and Southend Railway (LTSR) are to destinations in east London and south Essex, including Upminster, Grays, Basildon, Southend and Shoeburyness.

The station opened in 1841 to serve the L&BR and was rebuilt in 1854 when the LTSR, a joint venture between the L&BR and the Eastern Counties Railway (ECR), began operating. The ECR also operated trains out of Fenchurch Street to relieve congestion at its other London terminus at Bishopsgate. In 1862 the Great Eastern Railway was created by amalgamating various East Anglian railway companies (including the ECR) and it shared the station with the LTSR until 1912, when the latter was bought by the Midland Railway. The station came under ownership of the London & North Eastern Railway (LNER) following the Railways Act 1921, and was shared by LNER and London Midland & Scottish Railway (LMS) services until nationalisation in 1948. The line from the station was electrified in 1961, and closed for seven weeks in 1994.

Fenchurch Street is one of the smallest railway terminals in London in terms of platforms, but one of the most intensively operated. It is the only London terminal with no direct interchange with the London Underground, or its own bus stop. Plans to connect it stalled in the early 1980s because of the lack of progress on the Jubilee line, but it is within 350 yards (320 m) of both the Tower Hill station on the London Underground and the Tower Gateway station on the Docklands Light Railway.

== Location ==
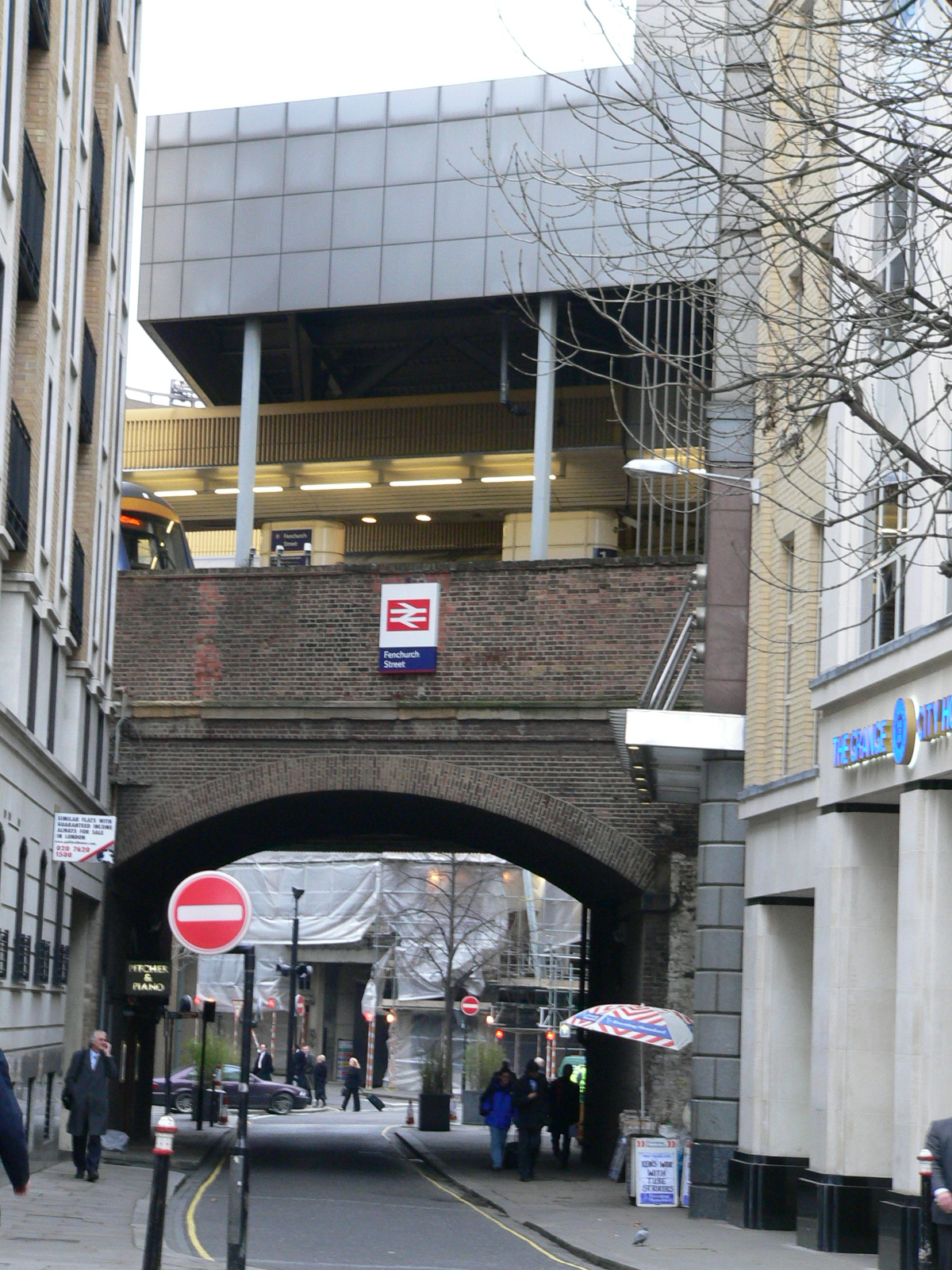
The station has an entrance on Cooper's Row, close to Tower Hill on the London Underground network

The station frontage is on Fenchurch Place, adjacent to Fenchurch Street in the City of London. It has two entrances: one on Fenchurch Place and another on Cooper's Row, near Tower Hill. There are four platforms arranged on two islands elevated on a viaduct. The station has been Grade II listed since 1972 and the conference venue One America Square is built adjacent to it. Following rail privatisation in 1994, the station was run by Network Rail. Since 1996, the station has been served by c2c.

Fenchurch Street is in London fare zone 1 like other terminal stations in the city, but it does not have a direct link to the London Underground. The nearest stations on the underground network are Tower Hill, about 0.2 miles (0.32 km) to the south-east, (Note: Fenchurch Street is marked as a main line station next to Tower Hill on a standard tube map.) and Aldgate, around 0.3 miles (0.48 km) to the north-east.

== History ==
=== London and Blackwall Railway ===
The area around Fenchurch Street is one of the oldest inhabited parts of London; the name Fenchurch derives from the Latin faenum (hay) and refers to hay markets in the area. The station was the first to be granted permission by the Corporation of London to be constructed inside the City of London, following several refusals against other railway companies.

The original building, designed by William Tite opened on 20 July 1841, serving the London and Blackwall Railway (L&BR), replacing a nearby terminus at Minories that had opened in July 1840. It had two platforms connected via a stairway to the booking hall. Steam locomotives did not use the station until 1849 because, previously, trains were dragged uphill from Blackwall to Minories and ran to Fenchurch Street via their own momentum. The reverse journey eastwards required a manual push from railway staff. William Marshall's railway bookstall established at the station in 1841 was the first to be opened in the City of London.

=== Eastern Counties Railway and London, Tilbury and Southend Railway ===
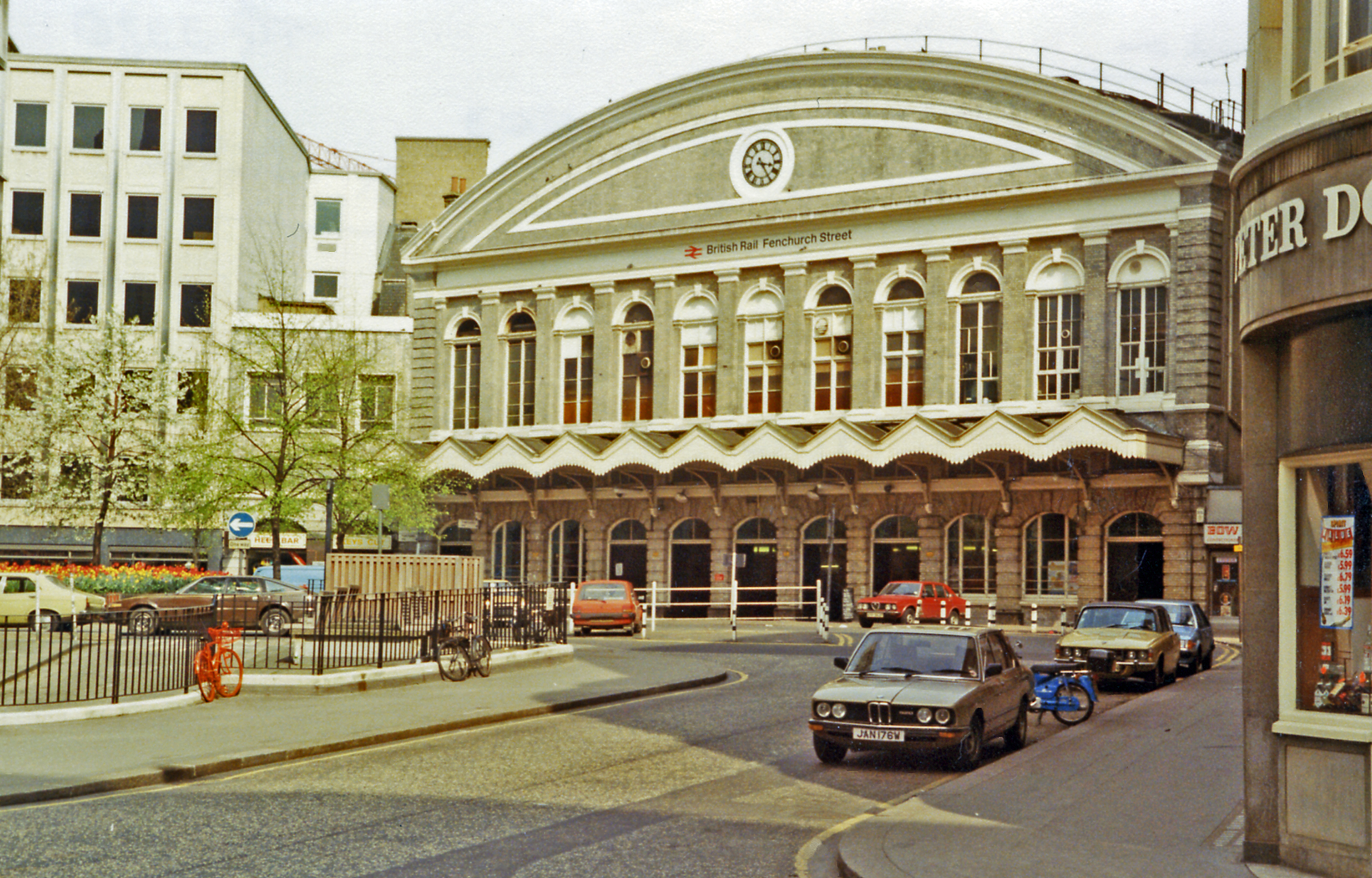
The station in the early 1980s; this building was constructed in 1854 by George Berkley. The zig-zag canopy is an addition from the 1870s

Following the opening of the London and Blackwall Extension Railway on 2 April 1849, services operated from Fenchurch Street to Bow & Bromley. Some were extended to Victoria Park & Bow where an interchange existed with the Eastern Counties Railway (ECR) from Bishopsgate.

On 26 September 1850, the East and West India Docks and Birmingham Junction Railway (renamed the North London Railway (NLR) on 1 January 1853) started operating a service from Bow into Fenchurch Street and the L&BR withdrew its service, closing the line between Gas Factory Junction and Bow & Bromley. The station had two heavily used platforms and a double tracked line from Stepney onwards. Following a reduced income at Blackwall (the South Eastern Railway had opened a direct line from Gravesend to London), LBR shareholders voted to align with the ECR and jointly construct the London, Tilbury and Southend Railway (LTSR) from Tilbury Riverside to Forest Gate Junction. Services would split at Stratford: one service to Bishopsgate and the other to Fenchurch Street, along the reopened line via Bow & Bromley (although the station did not reopen). To accommodate this service, a third line was built between Stepney and Fenchurch Street, which was enlarged at this time. The new service commenced on 13 April 1854, using ECR locomotives and stock.

To accommodate the changes, the station was enlarged to designs by George Berkley incorporating a 32 metres (105 ft) by 91 metres (299 ft) trussed-arch vaulted roof. (Note: Peter Kay suggests that the façade was designed by Tite.) Two platforms were added at the same time as was a circulating area for L&BR and LTSR traffic. The NLR, wanting its own London terminus instead of co-sharing Fenchurch Street, extended its railway towards the new Broad Street in 1865.

The railway through Stratford was unable to cope with the extra services, so the LTSR planned to build a more direct line from Barking to Gas Factory Junction. The third track from Stepney to Fenchurch Street opened in 1856, followed by the direct line from Barking in 1858. LTSR services were diverted from Stratford and a spur was opened at Abbey Mills Junction (east of Bromley) which allowed services to and from North Woolwich to operate directly from Fenchurch Street instead of via Stratford. On 22 August 1856, the line to Loughton was opened and Fenchurch Street became the usual terminus for its trains, being much more convenient for City commuters than Bishopsgate.

=== Great Eastern Railway ===
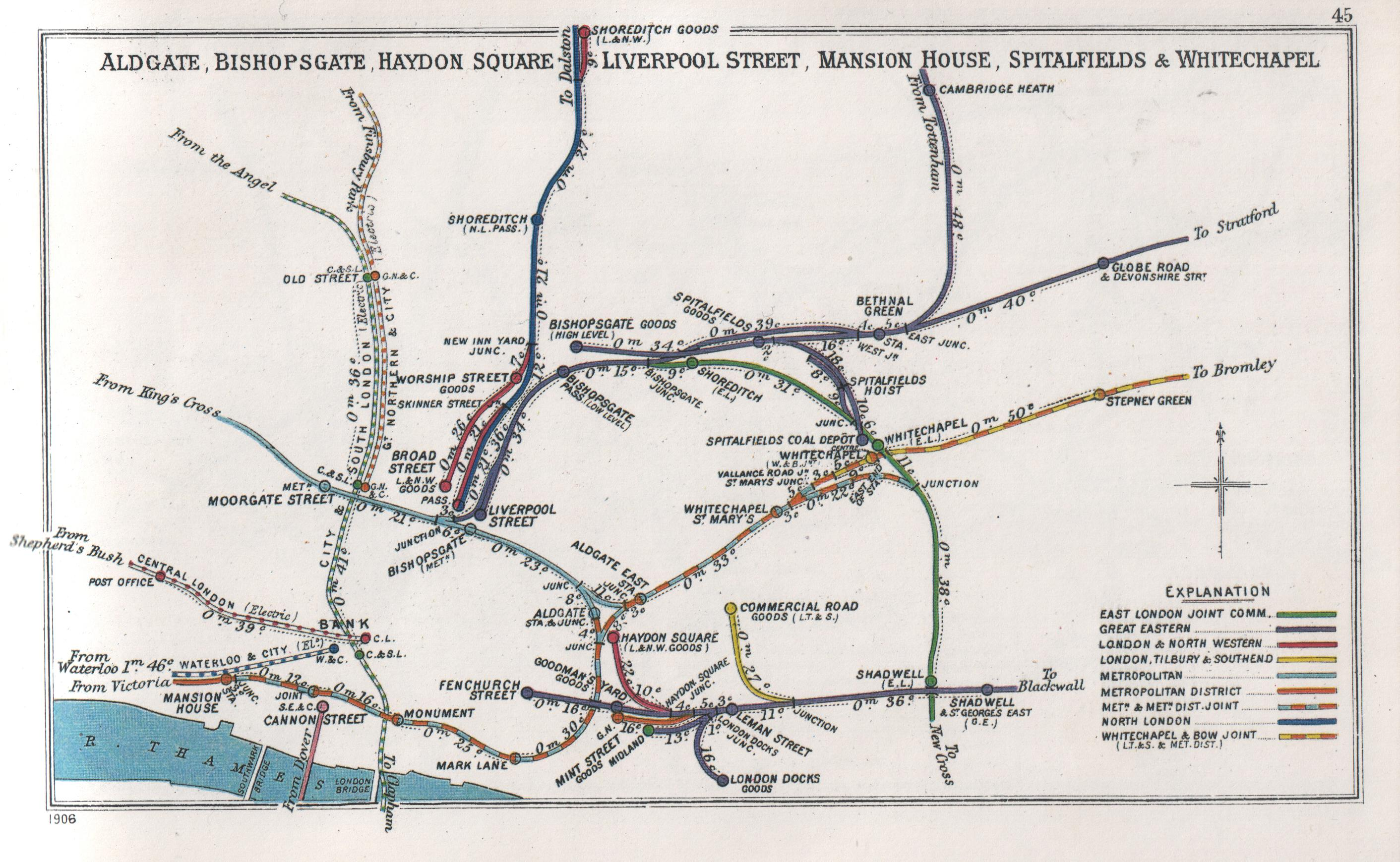
A Railway Clearing House diagram of the Fenchurch Street area, 1906

By the 1860s, railways in East Anglia were in financial difficulties and most lines were leased to the ECR. Although the companies wished to amalgamate, they could not obtain government consent until 1862, when the Great Eastern Railway (GER) was formed. In common with most railways, signalling was fairly basic and trains were separated by time interval. As traffic levels increased there was a need to improve signalling and, in 1869, the GER introduced absolute block working between Fenchurch Street, Gas Factory Junction and Bow Junction, opening signal boxes at all locations. In the 1870s, the flat awning over the station main's entrance was replaced with the current zig-zag canopy.

The station's track layout was rearranged in 1883 with platform extensions, a fifth platform for use by the Blackwall services and a new gantry signal box, which lasted until the 1935 remodelling. The GER used the station as an alternative to Liverpool Street during the late-19th and early-20th centuries for former ECR routes. The GER took over operation of the NLR shuttle from Bow in 1869, which it operated until April 1892 when the second Bow Road railway station opened, along with a passenger foot connection to the NLR station. Subsequent services into Fenchurch Street were operated by the GER and the LTSR; three years later, the viaduct from Stepney to Fenchurch Street was widened to accommodate a fourth track.

Despite this, overcrowding of LTSR services was still occurring and this persisted until 1902, when the opening of the Whitechapel and Bow Railway offered an alternative route.

In 1903, the GER built the Fairlop Loop, a short connecting line between Ilford and Woodford from where services ran to Liverpool Street and around 36 trains a day ran to Fenchurch Street. In 1912, the Midland Railway (MR) bought and took over operation of the LTSR services.

=== London, Midland and Scottish Railway ===
After the Railways Act 1921 the country's railways were grouped into four companies, with effect from 1 January 1923. At Fenchurch Street, the London, Midland and Scottish Railway (LMSR) took over operations of the MR, whilst GER services were taken over by the London and North Eastern Railway (LNER). Direct trains to Gallions were usually routed via Bromley at off-peak hours and a peak shuttle service operated from Custom House to Gallions. Passengers for the North Greenwich branch changed at Millwall Junction. The Blackwall and North Greenwich passenger services were scheduled for closure on 30 June 1926 but the general strike brought that forward to 3 May.

The station was rebuilt in 1935 to address overcrowding and provide better accommodation for Southend line services. When the former ECR lines transferred to the Underground's Central line in 1948, the station was served solely by the former LTSR services.

=== Nationalisation and beyond ===
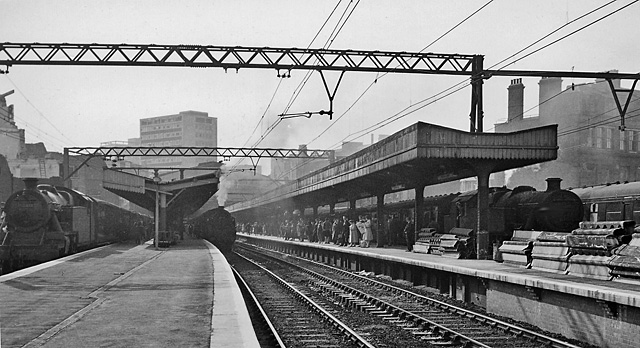
The station in 1961, just after its electrification and immediately before electric services began

Following nationalisation of Britain's railways in 1948, the station transferred under British Railways to the Eastern Region, although the old LTSR network west of Gasworks Junction was controlled by the London Midland Region. On 20 February 1949, the whole LTS line was transferred to the Eastern Region yet, despite the organisational changes, the old LTSR still was a distinctive system operated by former LTS and LMS locomotives until electrification.

British Railways electrified the former LTSR line in 1959. Electric services began on 6 November 1961 and a full timetable was introduced on 18 June the following year. In the 1980s, the station roof was dismantled and high-rise office blocks were built above it, leaving the 1854 facade intact.

Fenchurch Street station suffered a negative reputation under public ownership. By the end of the 1980s, the former LTSR line was carrying over 50,000 passengers a day on a 50-year old infrastructure. The persistent overcrowding and uncleanliness on trains led to it being dubbed the "Misery Line". In 1989, Sir Robert Reid, chairman of the British Rail board, called the service from Fenchurch Street "wholly unacceptable", while Teresa Gorman, MP for Billericay, subsequently called it "one of the disgraces of our public railway service for many years."

Between 1982 and 1992, the station was operated by Network SouthEast, one of British Rail's three passenger business sectors, before being handed over to a business unit in preparation for privatisation.

In July 1994, shortly before rail privatisation, the station closed for seven weeks for an £83 million project to replace signals, track and electrification works. It was the first significant closure of a London terminal station, albeit planned and temporary.

=== Post-privatisation ===
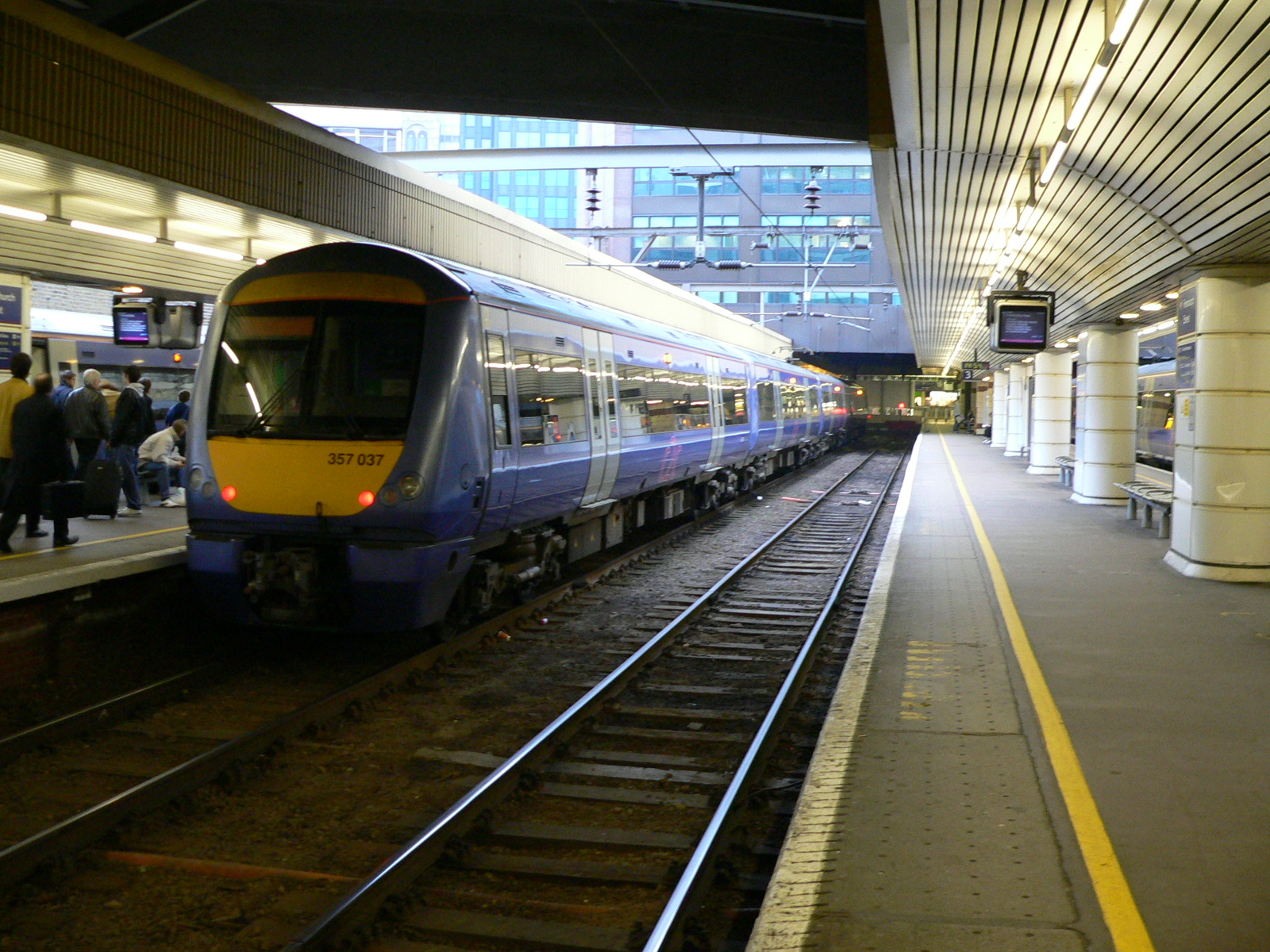
A c2c Class 357 unit at the station

The development of Lakeside Shopping Centre in Thurrock, near Chafford Hundred, increased demand for services from the station. In 2013, Network Rail announced a £3.4m upgrade creating a third exit on Cooper's Row to make connections with Tower Hill easier.

In 2019, a planning application was submitted to the City of London (planning authority) for permission to revamp the station building.

=== Connection to the Underground ===
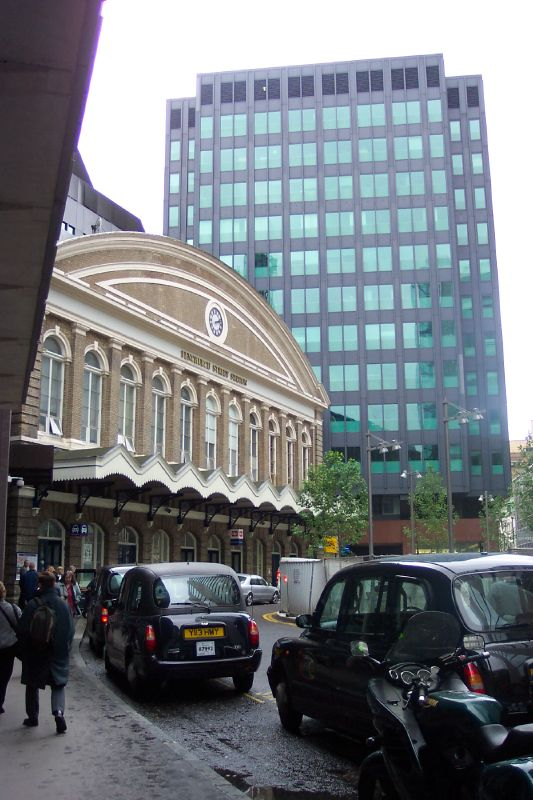
Space for a planned Underground station was allocated beneath an office block adjacent to the station

In the 1970s, it was planned to include Fenchurch Street as a station on the planned London Underground Fleet line. Space was allocated for a new Fenchurch Street Tube station in the basement of New London House, an office block that was constructed next to the main station in the 1970s.

Construction of the line by Mott, Hay and Anderson and Sir William Halcrow and Partners was completed as far as Charing Cross in 1979; the route came into operation as the Jubilee line. It was planned to extend the line eastwards from the end of the track terminus at Charing Cross to Fenchurch Street, via Aldwych and Ludgate Circus. From Fenchurch Street, the line would have crossed the river Thames and continued south-eastwards towards Surrey Docks and Lewisham. A revised scheme approved in 1980 envisaged a more northerly route to Woolwich Arsenal and Beckton. By 1981, rising costs and high inflation led to London Transport abandoning the eastwards extension.

The Jubilee line extension was completed in 1999, followed a different route south of the river, bypassing both Charing Cross and Fenchurch Street and instead heading east via Waterloo and the Greenwich Peninsula to Stratford. The extended Jubilee line crosses the LTS line from Fenchurch Street at West Ham and this interchange has altered demand for Fenchurch Street, with many passengers from Essex changing there instead.

== Services ==
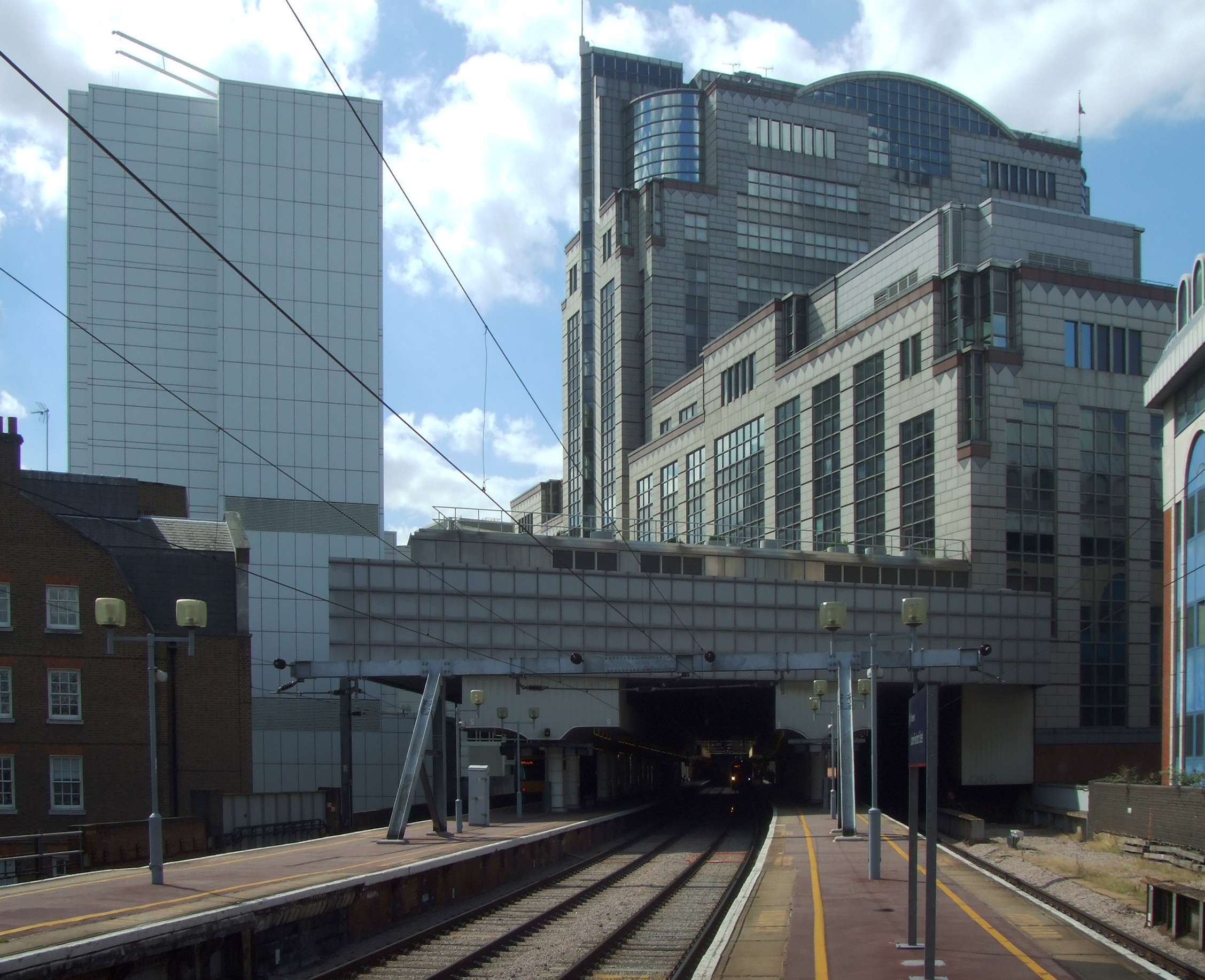
View of the platforms

Services from Fenchurch Street run towards east London and south Essex, including Barking, Upminster, Chafford Hundred Lakeside (for Lakeside Shopping Centre), Tilbury Town (for the Gravesend–Tilbury Ferry and cruise services) Basildon, Southend Central and Shoeburyness.

c2c operates the following typical weekday off-peak service in trains per hour (tph):

tph	Destination	Route	Stopping pattern
2	Shoeburyness	via Basildon	semi-fast
2	Shoeburyness	via Basildon	all stations
2	Southend Central	via Ockendon and Tilbury Town	all stations
2	Grays	via Rainham	all stations

Although the station's capacity is small compared to other London terminals, it has a high footfall, averaging around 16 million passengers annually. A report in 2001 showed that approximately 3,000 people commuted daily from Castle Point to the city via Fenchurch Street, while a 2013 report said it was the busiest station on the LTSR route, with 46,000 daily peak-time passengers.

Preceding station	National Rail	Following station
Terminus	c2c London, Tilbury and Southend line	Limehouse
Abandoned plans
Preceding station	London Underground	Following station
Cannon Street towards Stanmore	Jubilee line Phase 3 (1971/2) (never constructed)	Surrey Docks towards New Cross Gate or Lewisham
Cannon Street towards Stanmore	Jubilee line Phase 3 (1980) (never constructed)	St Katharine Docks towards Woolwich Arsenal or Beckton

== Future ==
There have been proposals to move the station 380 yards to the east, to allow the station to expand to six platforms, up from the current four. These would be built partly on the site of Tower Gateway DLR station, which would likely be permanently closed.

The new station could be built with direct interchange with Tower Hill, which could also have a replacement DLR station for Tower Gateway, as Transport for London have looked into closing the station and construct a replacement on the Bank branch to increase capacity.

== Incidents ==
- On 1 August 1859, two trains collided head-on at low speed when an arriving North Woolwich service passed a signal at danger and struck a stationary Tilbury Riverside service. No-one was injured.
- On 28 November 1860, a track defect caused the first four carriages of a departing train to Benfleet to derail at low speed. No-one was injured.
- On 24 June 1872, a service arriving from Bow collided with the buffer stops at the platform end, resulting in injury to three passengers.
- On 17 August 1872, two people were injured when their train collided with an empty train being shunted out of a siding.
- On 26 March 1873, an arriving train collided with two wagons of materials that had been left at the buffer stops, injuring four passengers. The cause was a combination of slightly excessive speed and slippery rails.
- On 4 May 1893, a bricklayer, described at the time as "deaf and dumb", who was working on lineside alterations on the Blackwall line, near the station. He was stuck by a train as he crossed the line, after not hearing shouted warnings. He later died from his injuries.
- On 2 September 1903, 11 passengers and a crew member were injured when a train hit the buffers as it arrived from Benfleet.
- On 9 March 1908, a point cleaner working near the station was injured. A Board of Trade inquiry criticised the lack of look-outs for railway workers.
- On 3 February 1912, approximately 86 people were injured when a train hit the buffer stops as it arrived from Westcliff; an estimated 860 passengers were on board at the time. Driver error and excessive speed were blamed.
- On 26 January 1927, ten people were injured on a train to Westcliff in a head-on collision and subsequent derailment. This was caused by defects in the signal detection and signals.

== Goods depots ==
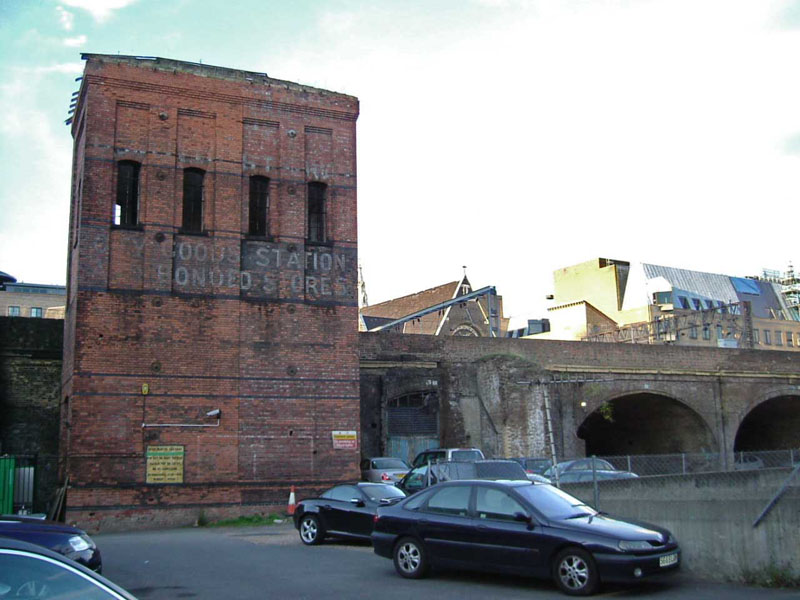
A disused hydraulic accumulator tower to the east of the station, later demolished

A number of goods depots were established near Fenchurch Street, owing to the station's proximity to the City of London. This table lists the depots connected to the line between the station and Christian Street Junction, just east of Leman Street:

Name	Company	Opening	Closed	Notes
Cable Street	Great Eastern Railway	1870s	??	Coal depot – leased by Charringtons
City Goods	Midland Railway	1 October 1862	1 July 1949	Closed after nationalisation (duplication of facilities). An hydraulic accumulator tower lasted until 2015, when it was demolished
Commercial Road	LTSR	17 April 1886	3 July 1967	
East Smithfield	Great Eastern Railway	17 June 1864	1 September 1966	Short quarter-mile branch that led to the Thames riverside. Marked as London Docks on the Railway Clearing House diagram above.
Goodmans Yard	L&BR	1 February 1861	1 April 1951	Built later for ECR and LTSR traffic. Badly damaged during London Blitz.
Haydon Square	London North Western Railway	12 March 1853	2 July 1962	A short fragment of the viaduct serving the depot can be seen today (2015).
Mint Street	L&BR then leased to the Great Northern Railway from 1861	1 August 1858	1 April 1951	Contained part of the original Minories station building. Known as Royal Mint Street c1870. Badly damaged by bombs in the Blitz on 29 December 1940. Closed after nationalisation (duplication of facilities).

== In popular culture ==
The poet Sir John Betjeman passed through the station on day-trips to Southend and described it as a "delightful hidden old terminus."

The first documented murder on the British railway network occurred on 9 July 1864, when Franz Muller murdered Thomas Briggs shortly after a train left the station en route to Chalk Farm.

Fenchurch Street is one of four London railway termini on the standard UK Monopoly board, along with Liverpool Street, Marylebone and King's Cross. All are former LNER terminal stations.

The 2005 football hooliganism film Green Street used the station to represent Manchester Piccadilly.

In the Douglas Adams novel, So Long, and Thanks for All the Fish, Fenchurch was so-named because she was conceived at the station.
