= Pontoon Dock DLR station =

Docklands Light Railway station

Pontoon Dock
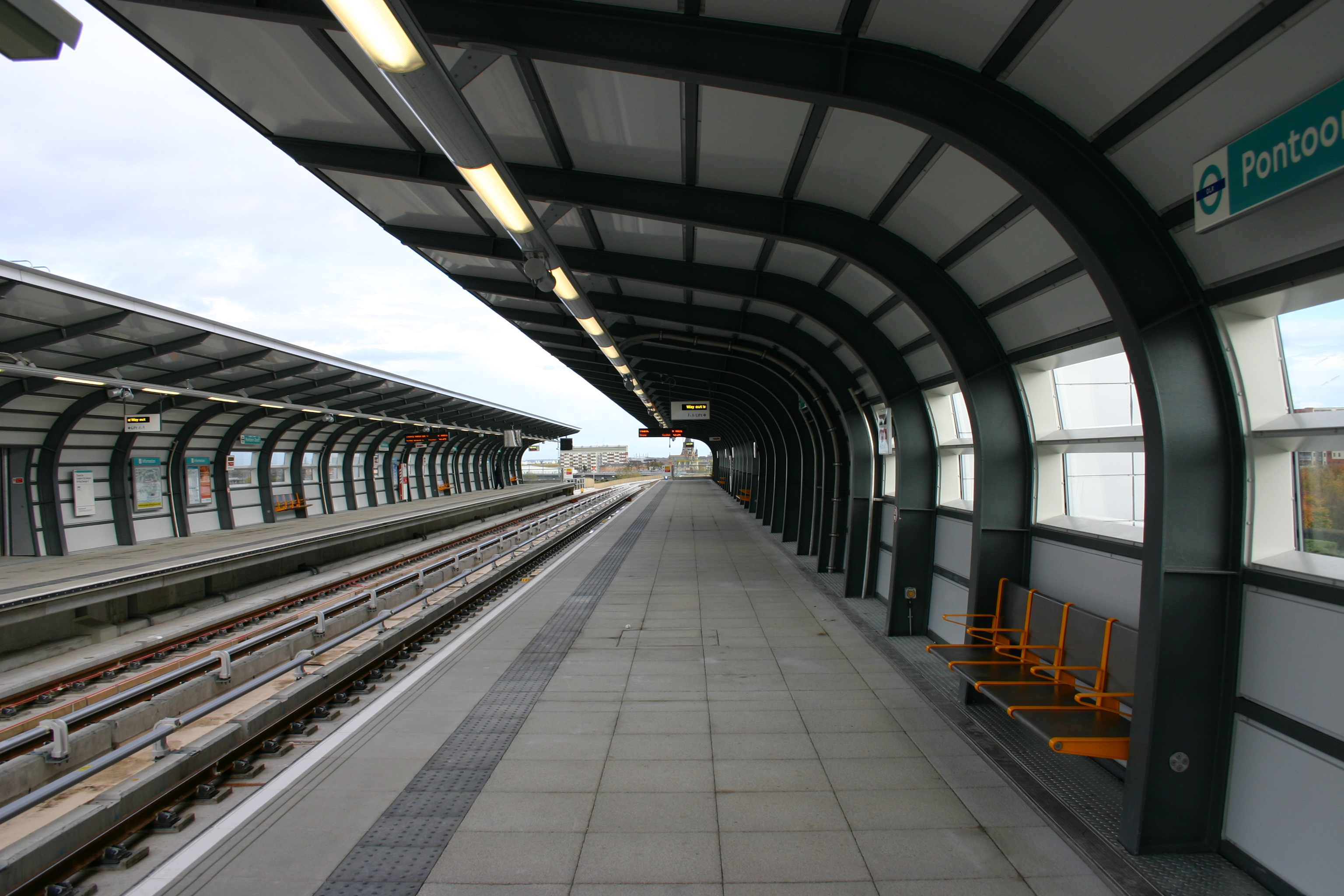
- Platforms in 2005

General information
- Location: Silvertown, Newham
- Coordinates: 51.502222°N 0.031944°E
- Owned by: Transport for London
- Managed by: Docklands Light Railway
- Platforms: 2

Construction
- Structure type: Elevated
- Accessible: Yes

Other information
- Status: Unstaffed
- Fare zone: 3
- Website: Official website

History
- Opened: 2 December 2005

Passengers

DLR annual entry and exit
- 2020: ▼1.285 million
- 2021: ▲1.794 million
- 2022: ▲2.810 million
- 2023: ▲2.830 million
- 2024: ▼2.63 million
Location
- Location in Newham

Pontoon Dock is a station on the Docklands Light Railway (DLR) in Silvertown in east London, which is on the Woolwich Arsenal branch, opened on 2 December 2005. It is located in the east of Silvertown in the London Borough of Newham, in the redevelopment zone known as Silvertown Quays, and is in London fare zone 3.

== History ==
Originally DLR trains from Canning Town ran easterly to Royal Victoria and on to Beckton. On 2 December 2005 the King George V branch (since extended to Woolwich Arsenal) was opened and gave another, more southeasterly, route on which there are now four intermediate stations, West Silvertown, Pontoon Dock, London City Airport, and King George V. During the London 2012 Olympic games it was connected by a pathway over the road to the exit of the ExCeL centre.

At around 00:45 GMT on 1 November 2025, one person suffered facial injuries in a knife attack at the station. Police subsequently arrested 32-year-old Anthony Williams, from Peterborough, on suspicion of attempted murder and possession of a bladed article. These charges came after Williams had been arrested and charged with allegedly carrying out the 2025 Cambridgeshire train stabbing attack, which occurred later on the same day.

Pontoon Dock station will be upgraded with work starting in summer 2026 and expected to complete in 2028. This will include the construction of six new escalators and a new mezzanine level.

== Location ==
The track through Pontoon Dock parallels the (A1020) North Woolwich Road, and gives excellent views to the south across the Thames Barrier Park of the Thames Barrier. Pontoon Dock station is near the small eponymous quay, the Barrier Point residential complex and Royal Wharf, a large commercial and residential development on the riverside, which now covers the location previously owned by Brunner Mond, where the infamous Silvertown explosion occurred and where there is now a small memorial.

As of September 2016, this memorial has been moved to the main park of the Royal Wharf development.

A crossover at Pontoon Dock allows trains to reverse in service disruptions.

== Connections ==
London Buses routes 129, 241 and 330 serve the station.

== Services ==
The typical off-peak service in trains per hour from Pontoon Dock is:

- 6 tph to Stratford International
- 6 tph to Bank
- 12 tph to Woolwich Arsenal

Additional services call at the station during the peak hours, increasing the service to up to 16 tph in each direction, with up to 8 tph to Bank and Stratford International.

Preceding station	DLR	Following station
West Silvertown towards Bank or Stratford International	Docklands Light Railway	London City Airport towards Woolwich Arsenal
