= East London Cemetery =

Cemetery in east London, England

Coordinates: 51.527°N 0.015°E

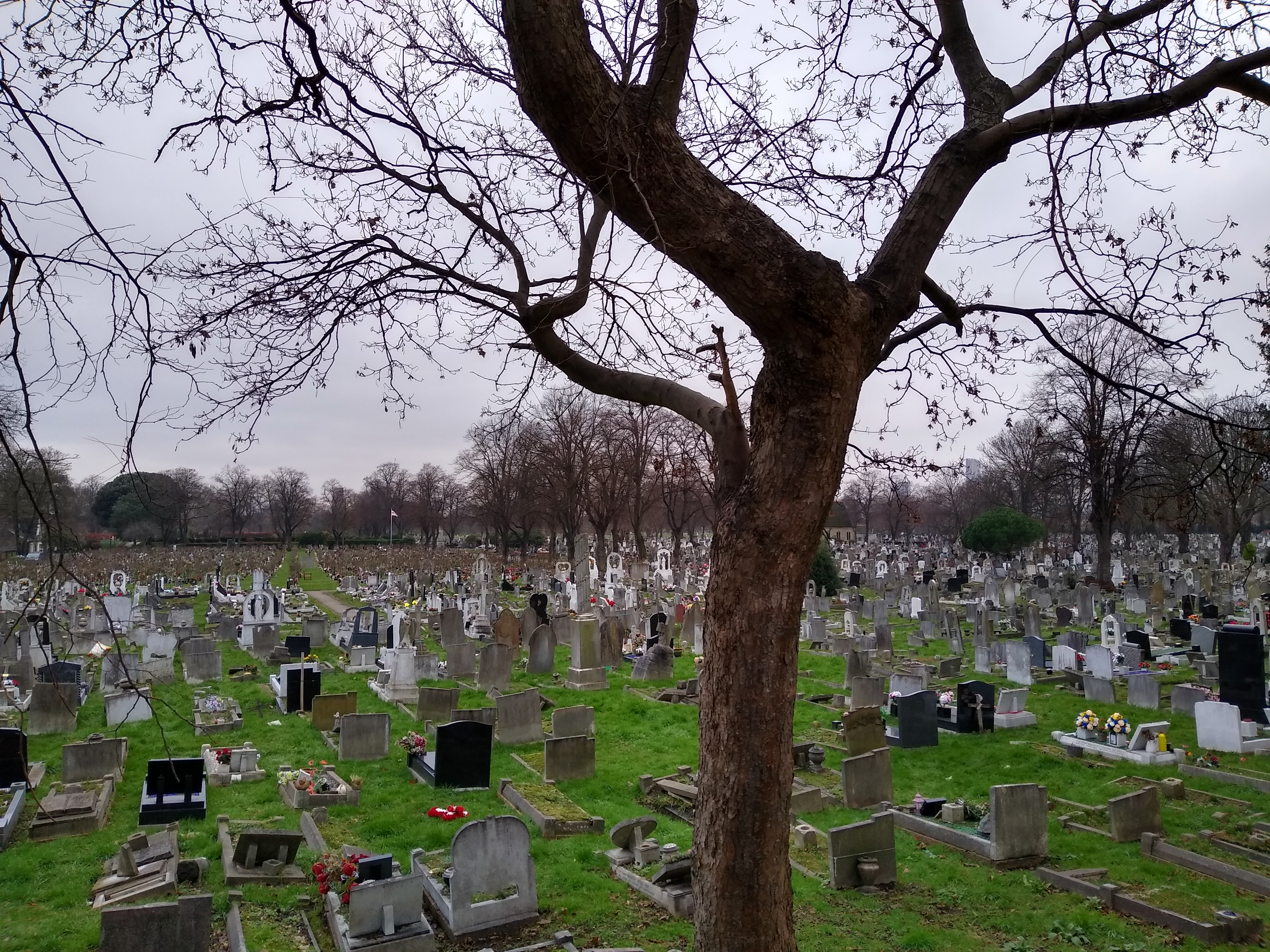
East London Cemetery

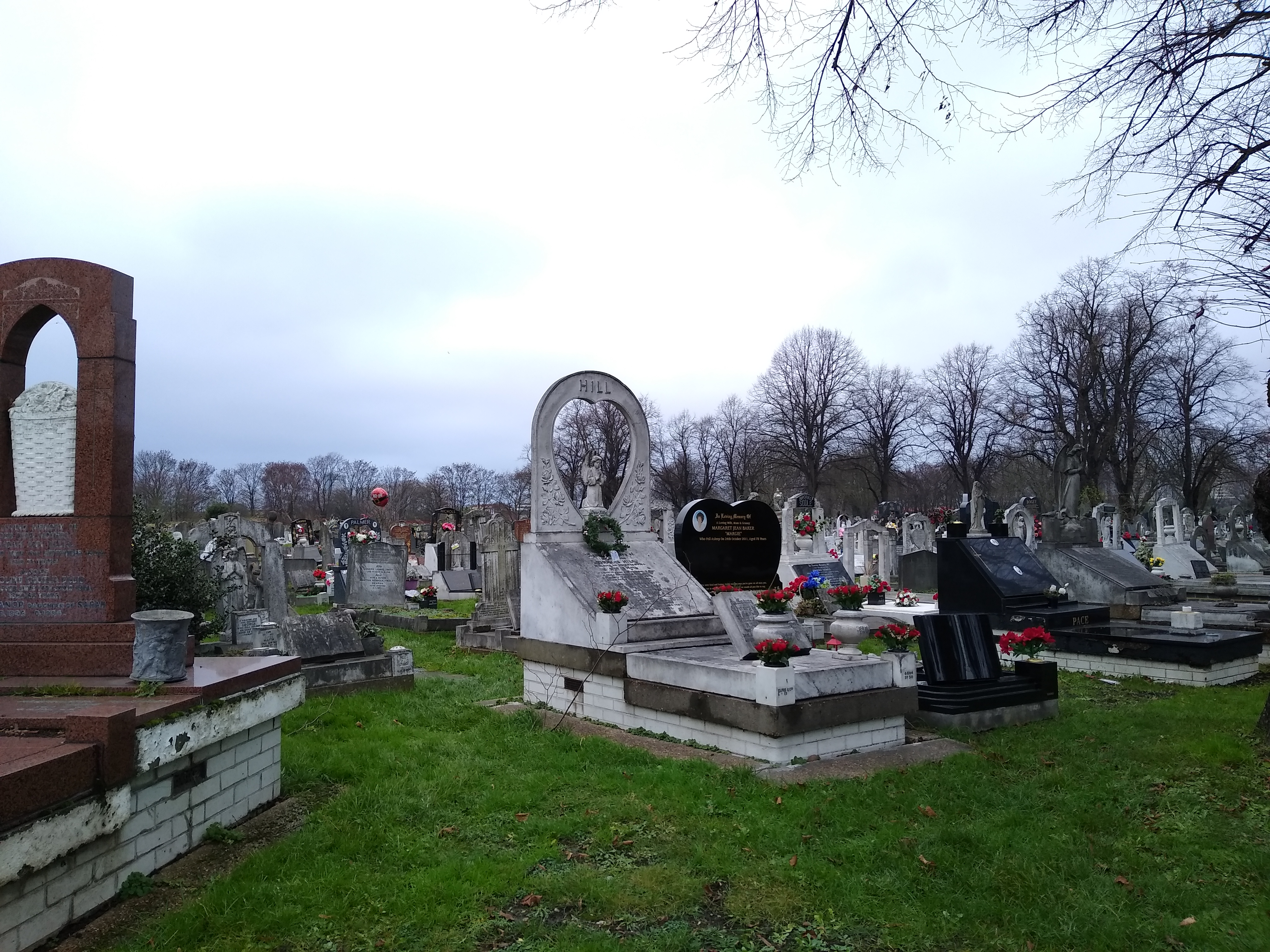
East London Cemetery

The East London Cemetery and Crematorium are located in Plaistow in the London Borough of Newham. It is now owned and operated by the Dignity Funeral Group, the East London Cemetery Company being its previous owner.

== History ==
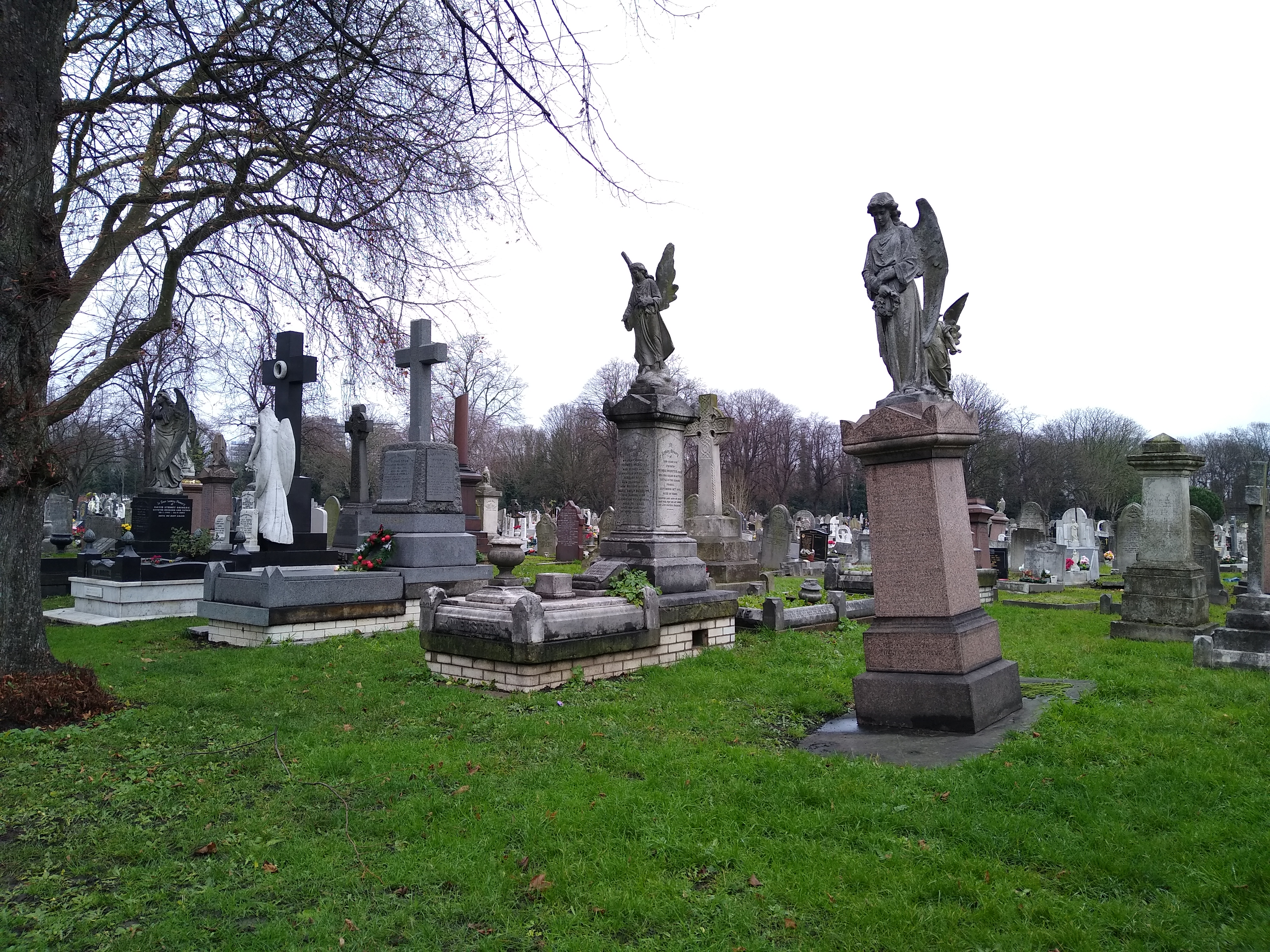

The cemetery was founded in 1871 and laid out in 1872 to meet the increasing demand from the eastern suburbs of London. The first interment was in August 1872 and the cemetery remains open. The cemetery covers 33 acres (0.13 km^{2}) next to the Greenway and has two Gothic chapels built at the end of the 19th century that remain in use: a burial chapel dedicated to Church of St Michael and All Angels, and a non-denominational chapel for cremations.

A total of 244 Commonwealth service casualties from World War I and 132 from World War II are buried in this cemetery, in addition to three Dutch merchant seamen from the latter war.

== Burials ==
=== Memorials ===
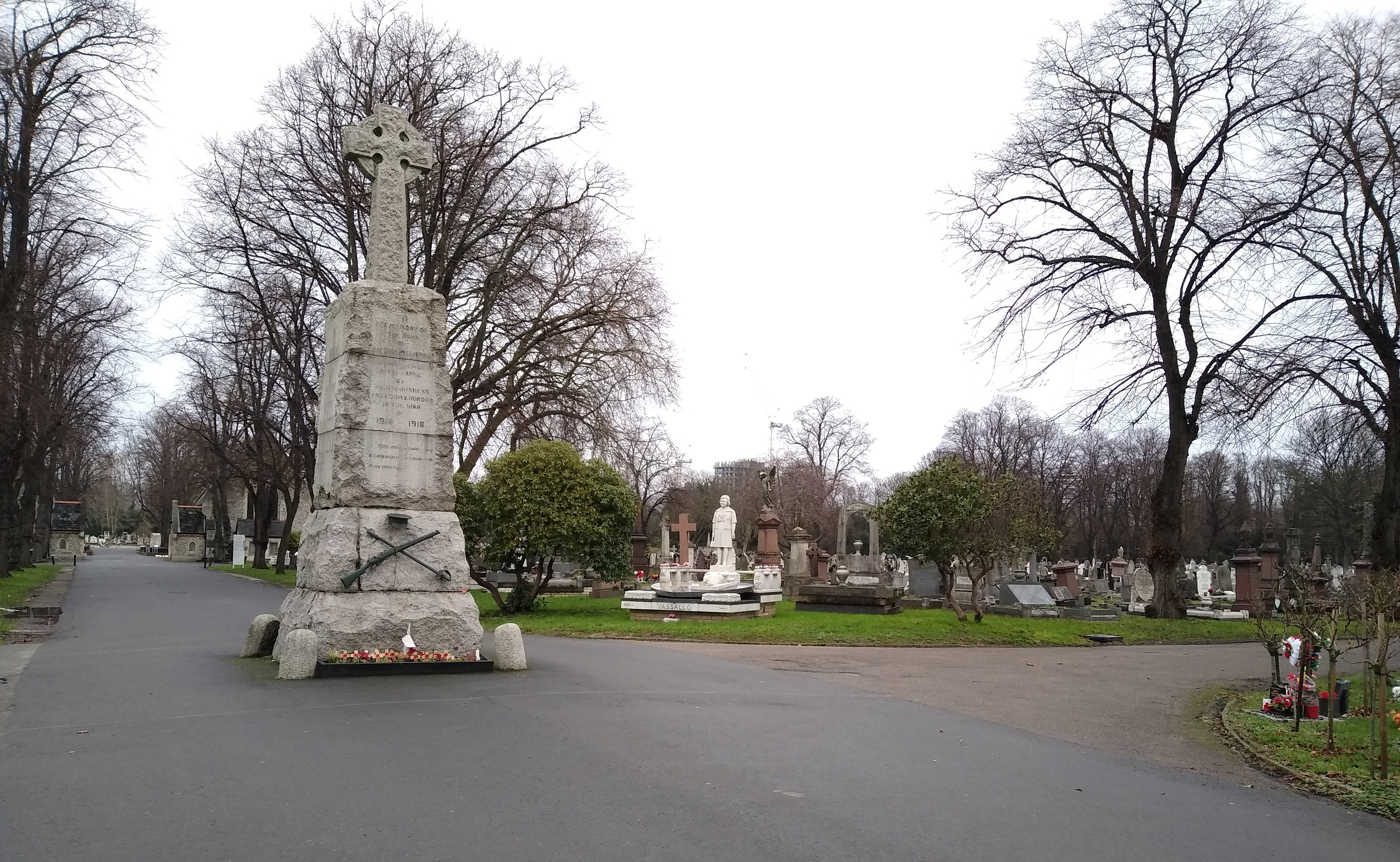

Disaster victims:

- Memorial to the 550 victims of the 1878 SS Princess Alice disaster.
- Memorial, marked by a ship's anchor, commemorates those who died when the staging collapsed during the launching of HMS Albion in 1898.
- A further disaster, the Silvertown explosion of 1917, is commemorated in the grave of Andrea Angel, chemist at the Brunner Mond chemical works, whose TNT plant exploded, damaging up to 70,000 properties in the area, killing 73 people and causing over 400 casualties.

CWGC memorials:

- Stone kerb wall in Soldiers' and Sailors' Plot, listing 97 Commonwealth servicemen buried in it in World War I.
- Screen Wall memorial, close to main drive, listing Commonwealth servicemen of the same World War buried elsewhere in the cemetery, whose graves could not be marked by headstones.
- Collective Grave memorial panel listing service and civilian victims of World War II air raids buried within the grave.
- Screen Wall memorial listing Commonwealth service personnel of the latter war whose graves could not be marked by headstones.

== Notable burials ==
- Andrea Angel (1877–1917), chemist
- Michael Barrington (1924–1988), actor
- Christopher Blake (1949–2004), actor
- Robert Cawdron (1921–1997), actor
- Beryl Cooke (1906–2001), actress
- Sylvia Coleridge (1909–1986), actress
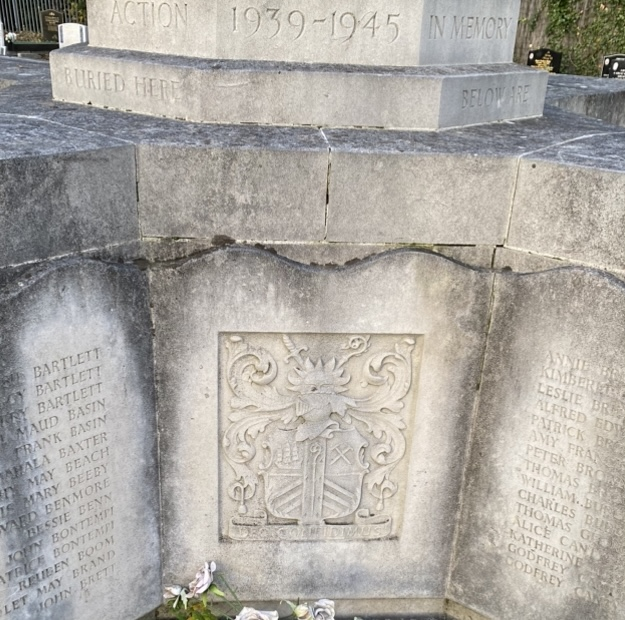
- The coat of arms of the County Borough of West Ham, within which the cemetery was located until 1965, displayed on a World War Two memorial in the cemetery
  Leslie Dwyer (1906–1986), actor
- Hilda Fenemore (1919–2004), actress
- McDonald Hobley (1917–1987), broadcaster
- Arthur Howard (1910–1995), actor
- Charles Lamb (1900–1989), actor
- Carl Hans Lody – the first person to be shot during World War I in the Tower of London as a spy is buried under his own black headstone. Ten other German spies shot in World War I are buried under a small memorial stone, about 150 yards from Lody's grave, next to a pathway
- Mollie Maureen (1904–1987), actress
- Michael Mellinger (1929–2004), actor
- Billy Milton (1905–1989), actor
- Blair Peach (1946-1979), anti-racist activist
- Harry Reeve (1893-1958), boxer
- Terry Spinks MBE, (1938–2012), Olympic Gold Medallist in boxing, 1956
- Tony Steedman (1927–2001), actor
- Elizabeth Stride (1843–1888), victim of Jack the Ripper
- Will Thorne CBE (1857-1946), trade union leader and Labour MP
- Maurice Wagg (1840–1926), American Civil War Medal of Honor recipient
- Jack Warner OBE MSM (1895-1981), actor
- Doris Waters (1899–1978), singer
- Elsie Waters (1893-1990), singer

== Cremation of notables ==
- Lilian Baylis CH (1874-1937), theatrical producer and manager, ashes scattered
- William Dysart (1929–2002), actor
- Queenie Watts (1923-1980), actress
