= Maurice Wagg =

British-born recipient of the Medal of Honor

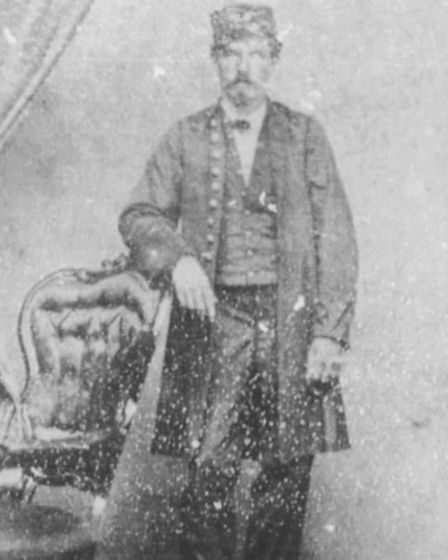
- Civil War era Navy Medal of Honor
- Born: July 23, 1840; Christchurch, Dorset, England
- Died: June 22, 1926 (aged 85); Poplar, London, England
- Military career
- Allegiance: United States of America
- Branch: United States Navy
- Rank: Coxswain
- Unit: USS Rhode Island
- Conflicts: Civil War
- Awards: Medal of Honor

Maurice Wagg (23 July 1840 – 22 June 1926) was a British-born veteran of the American Civil War and a recipient of the Medal of Honor.

Wagg was born in Christchurch in England in 1840, the second of nine children of Georgina and George Wagg, a tailor. As a young man Maurice Wagg took to a life at sea. In 1861 on the outbreak of the Civil War he was in New York where he enlisted in the Union Navy, serving as coxswain on the U.S.S. Rhode Island.

== Sinking of the USS Monitor ==
Civil War era Navy Medal of Honor

On December 30, 1862, the USS Monitor floundered near Cape Hatteras. Wagg, a sailor on the USS Rhode Island helped to pull crew members of the USS Monitor into one of the Rhode Island's lifeboats. Wagg and several members of the crew of the Rhode Island were credited with saving the lives of four officers and twelve crew members. As a result of his actions, Wagg was awarded the Medal of Honor and promoted to the rank of Acting Master's Mate. He and six other sailors of the USS Rhode Island were the first individuals to receive the Medal of Honor for a non-combat action.

== Citation ==
Served on board the U.S.S. Rhode Island, which was engaged in saving the lives of the officers and crew of the Monitor off Hatteras, 31 December 1862. Participating in the hazardous task of rescuing the officers and crew of the sinking Monitor, Wagg distinguished himself by meritorious conduct during this operation.

== Later life ==
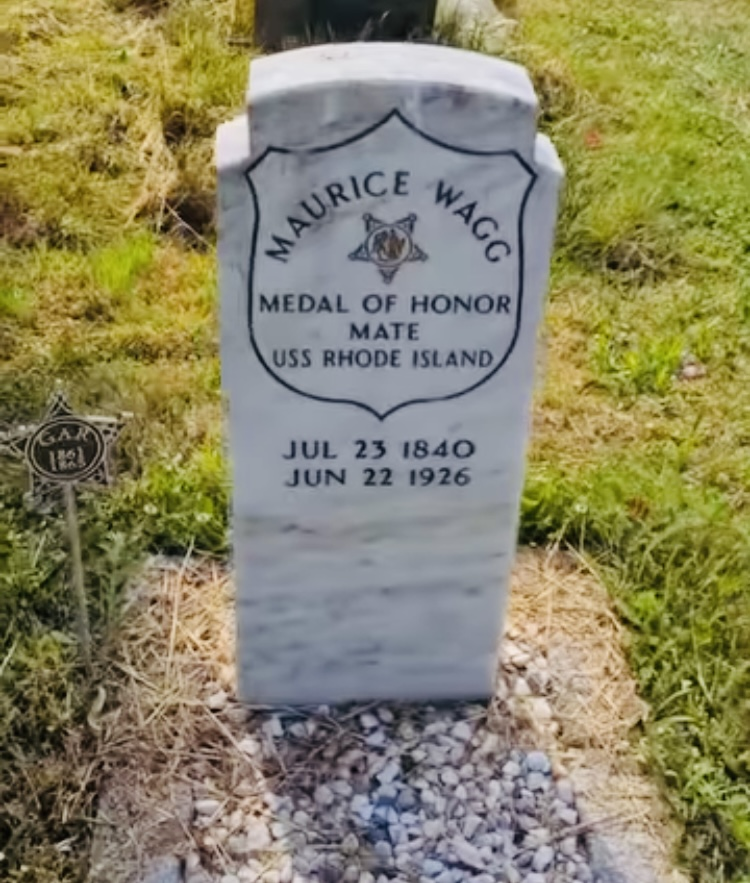
The restored grave of Maurice Wagg in the East London Cemetery

On the conclusion of his military service Wagg returned to Britain where in 1875 he was lodging with his aunt. In 1880 he married Harriet Jane née Golden (1842-1939), the marriage certificate listing his occupation as 'mariner'. Their children were Ernest Maurice Wagg (1881-1901) and William Wagg (1882-1883). In the 1891 and 1901 census returns for Poplar his occupation is listed as 'stevedore's labourer', while in the 1911 census for Poplar aged 70 he is listed as a labourer in a chemical works.

Maurice Wagg died aged 85 from senile decay and bronchitis at his home in Galbraith Street in Poplar on June 22, 1926. He was buried in an unmarked pauper’s grave at the East London Cemetery in England. In 2020 his grave was rededicated and a headstone placed at the head of the grave.

When after his death his blind widow aged 83 applied for a widow’s pension she was turned down as her marriage to Wagg was bigamous. It transpired that in 1855 in Richmond, Maine Wagg had married a Mary Ann Murphy (1830-1910) but abandoned her just weeks later. The couple never having divorced the result was that Harriet Wagg was not entitled to a pension from the US Government. Her last years were spent in the Poplar Institution, a workhouse.
