= London City Airport DLR station =

Docklands Light Railway station

London City Airport
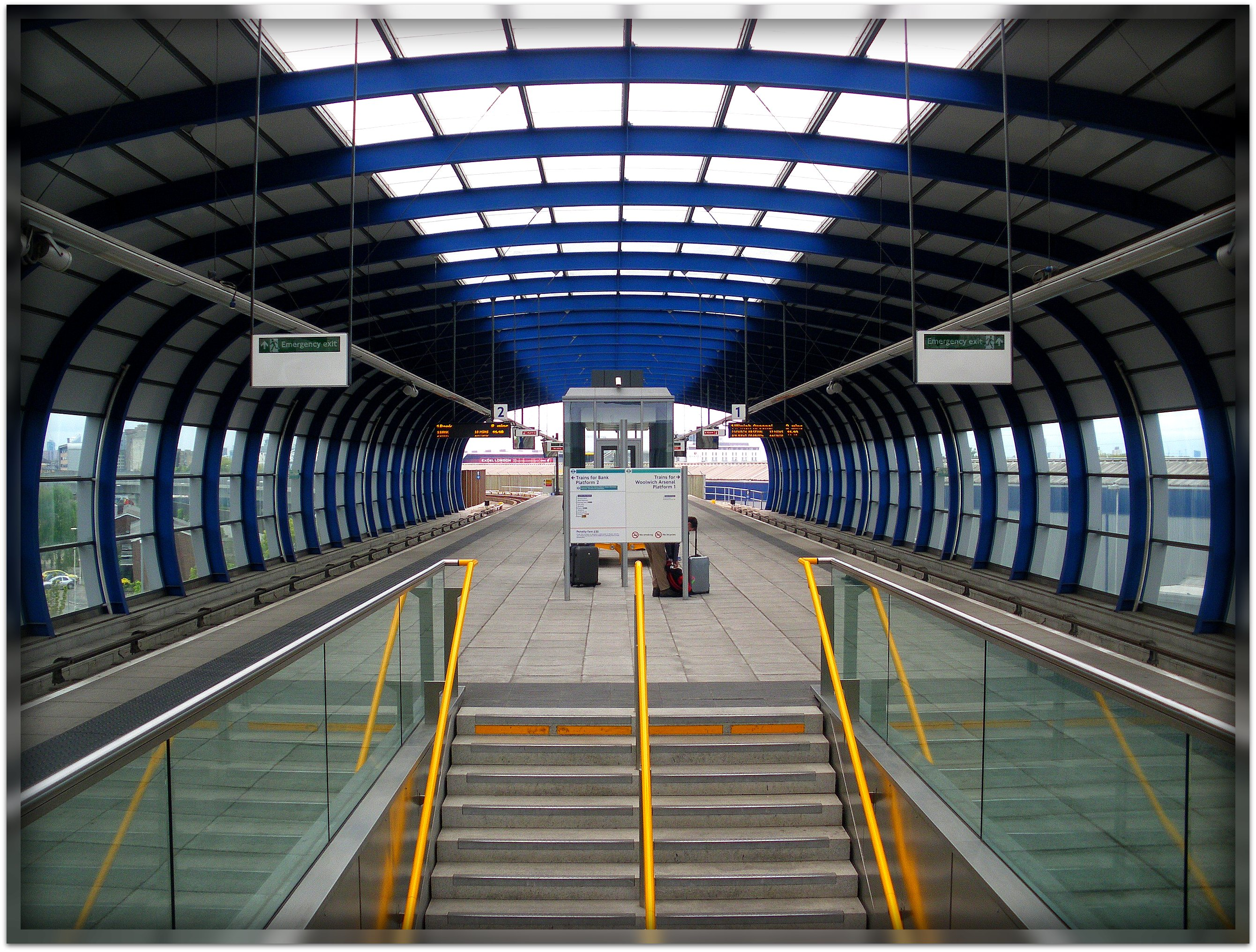
- Platforms in 2011

General information
- Location: London City Airport, Newham
- Coordinates: 51.503611°N 0.048889°E
- Owner: Transport for London
- Manager: Docklands Light Railway
- Platforms: 2

Construction
- Structure type: Elevated
- Accessible: Yes

Other information
- Status: Unstaffed
- Fare zone: 3
- Website: Official website

History
- Opened: 2 December 2005

Passengers

DLR annual entry and exit
- 2021: ▲1.601 million
- 2022: ▲3.220 million
- 2023: ▲3.480 million
- 2024: ▼3.45 million
- 2025: ▼3.27 million
Location
- Location in Newham

London City Airport is a light metro station on the Docklands Light Railway (DLR) Stratford-Woolwich and Bank-Woolwich Lines; serving London City Airport in East London. It opened on 2 December 2005. It was first located on what was initially King George V branch, and was, until the extension to Woolwich Arsenal was completed, the reason for this branch. It continues to be an important station on the DLR. Trains run westbound to Bank in the City of London, northbound to Stratford International and eastbound to Woolwich Arsenal. The station is in the London Borough of Newham and is located in London fare zone 3.

== History ==
Prior to December 2005, Docklands Light Railway trains would arrive at Canning Town and would only be able to continue in a southeasterly direction towards Royal Victoria. In December 2005, however, the new King George V branch was opened.

Before the station was built the land was home to Drew Primary School; the school was over 100 years old and consisted of three floors with classrooms also on the roof. Following the start of construction, the primary school moved to a building a short distance down the road from the station.

== Design ==
The station (like many Docklands Light Railway stations) is elevated. It is also fully enclosed. There are two entrances to the station and the platforms are connected by escalators and lifts to an intermediate level with a direct link into the airport concourse. Main access to the station for local passengers and mobility impaired customers is by a lower level subway.

It has a direct covered connection with the adjacent airport terminal building. Although the station maintains the DLR philosophy of design, it makes concessions to cater for airport passengers, including a fully enclosed waiting room on the central island platform and, unusually for the DLR, a staffed ticket office. There is a crossover west of the station which allows trains from Poplar and Woolwich Arsenal to reverse here during periods of disruption.

== Location ==
The station is situated to the west side of London City Airport in Silvertown.

== Services ==
The typical off-peak service in trains per hour from London City Airport is:

- 6 tph to Stratford International
- 6 tph to Bank
- 12 tph to Woolwich Arsenal

Additional services call at the station during the peak hours, increasing the service to up to 16 tph in each direction, with up to 8 tph to Bank and Stratford International.

Preceding station	DLR	Following station
Pontoon Dock towards Bank or Stratford International	Docklands Light Railway	King George V towards Woolwich Arsenal

== Connections ==
London Buses routes 129, 473 and 474 serve the station.
