= Silvertown War Memorial =

War memorial in London

Coordinates: 51.4999°N 0.0277°E

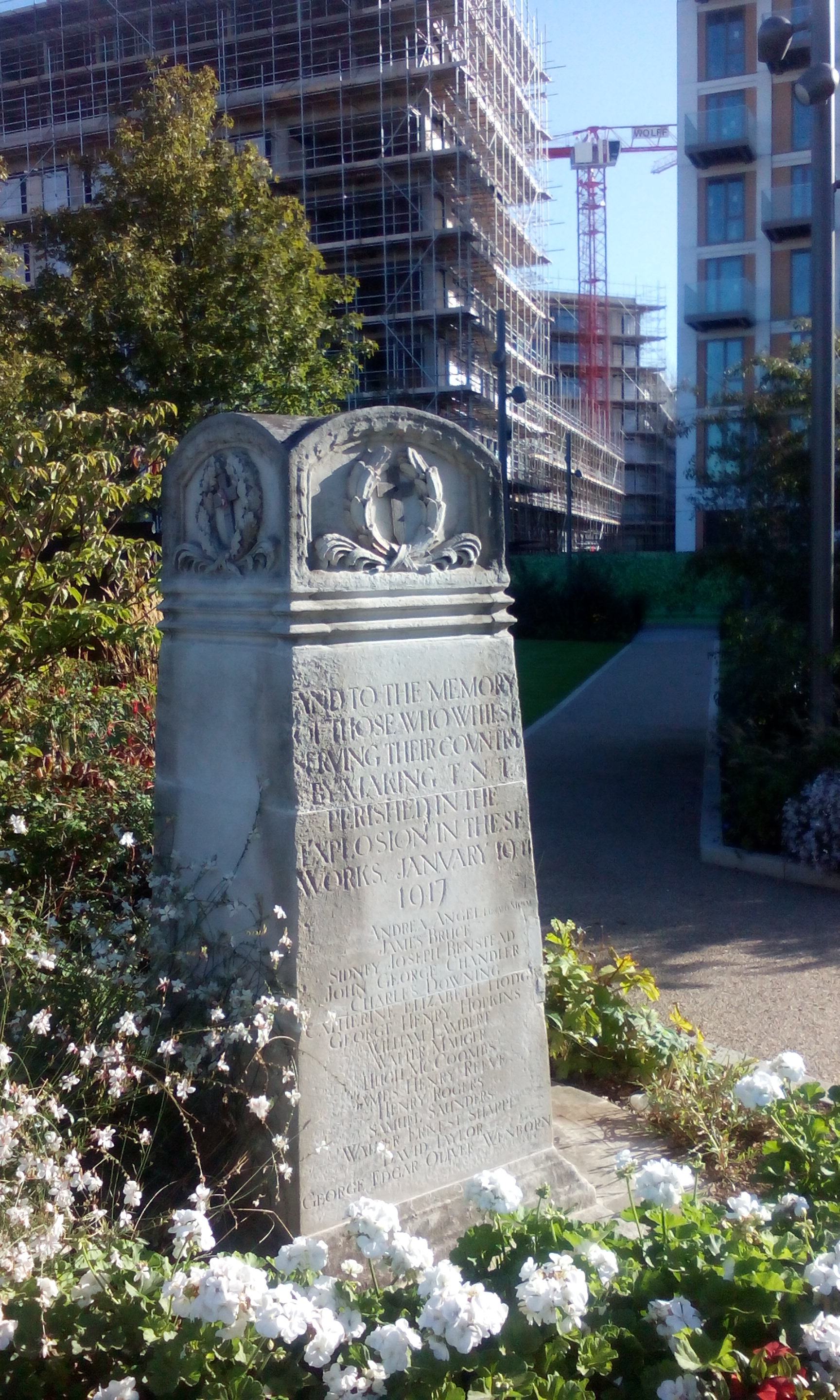
Relocated memorial in 2016

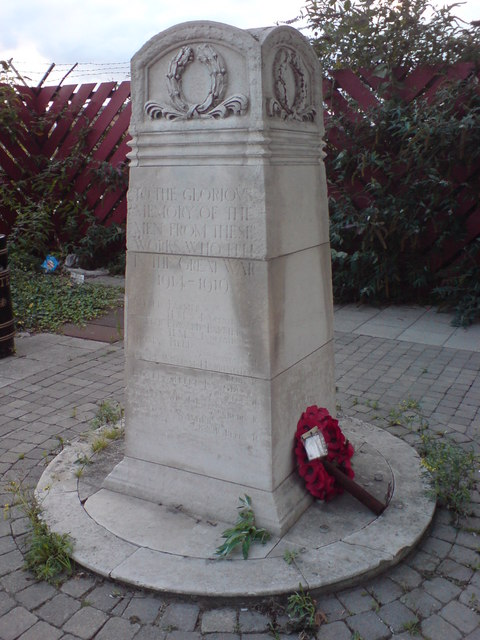
Memorial at its original site in 2009

Silvertown War Memorial, also known as Silvertown Explosion Memorial, is a war memorial in Silvertown, in East London. It serves as a memorial for the workers at the Brunner Mond chemical plant who were killed on active service during the First and Second World Wars, while also commemorating the people killed in the Silvertown explosion on 17 January 1917. It became a Grade II listed building in 1999.

The Silvertown factory was owned by the Brunner Mond chemical business, a forerunner to ICI, and had been used for the manufacture of caustic soda. The factory was mothballed before the war, and the government decided to use its spare industrial capacity for the purification of TNT, using a process that was acknowledged to be dangerous in a built-up residential area. At about 7 pm on Friday 19 January 1917, after most of the workers had left for the night, an accidental fire spread and ignited over 50 tons of TNT, killing 73 people in and around the factory (69 immediately, and four later from their injuries), and injuring hundreds more; it also destroyed the factory and hundreds of local houses, and damaged thousands more.

The memorial was erected in the 1920s by Brunner Mond on North Woolwich Road, beside their factory. It comprises a tapering limestone obelisk about 1.5 metres (4 ft 11 in) high, with blocks bearing inscriptions topped by a slightly domed block, each face of which is carved with a wreath. The memorial originally stood on a circular stone plinth.

One face of the memorial, to the east, was carved with the inscription "TO THE GLORIOUS / MEMORY OF THE / MEN FROM THESE / WORKS WHO FELL / IN THE GREAT WAR / 1914–1919", together with the names of 7 men. The west face had the inscription "AND TO THE MEMORY / OF THOSE WHO WHILST / SERVING THEIR COUNTRY / BY MAKING T.N.T. / PERISHED IN THE / EXPLOSION IN THESE / WORKS. JANUARY 19TH / 1917" with a further list of 18 names, including Andrea Angel, who was posthumously awarded the Edward Medal. A further inscription on the south face reads "ALSO TO THE MEMORY OF THOSE WHO FELL IN THE SECOND WORLD WAR 1939 – 1945" with another seven names. The north face remains blank.

The site of the destroyed factory remained empty for nearly a century, but a neighbouring factory continued in operation until 1961. Both sites were cleared for a residential redevelopment in 2014, and construction of the Royal Wharf development began in 2015. As part of the development, the memorial was removed from its original location near the road, at the entrance to the site, restored, and re-erected in 2016 elsewhere on the site, closer to the River Thames. Relatives of those killed by the explosion attended a service beside the memorial to commemorate the centenary of the explosion on 17 January 2017.

== Bibliography ==
- Silvertown Explosion Memorial, Public Monuments and Sculpture Association
- Silvertown Brunner Mond Memorial, War Memorials Online
- Works War Memorial, Silvertown, London E16, Carl's Cam
- Relocation of the Silvertown War Memorial at Royal Wharf, Newham Council
