= Millennium Mills =

Derelict former mill in London

Coordinates: 51.5054°N 0.0303°E

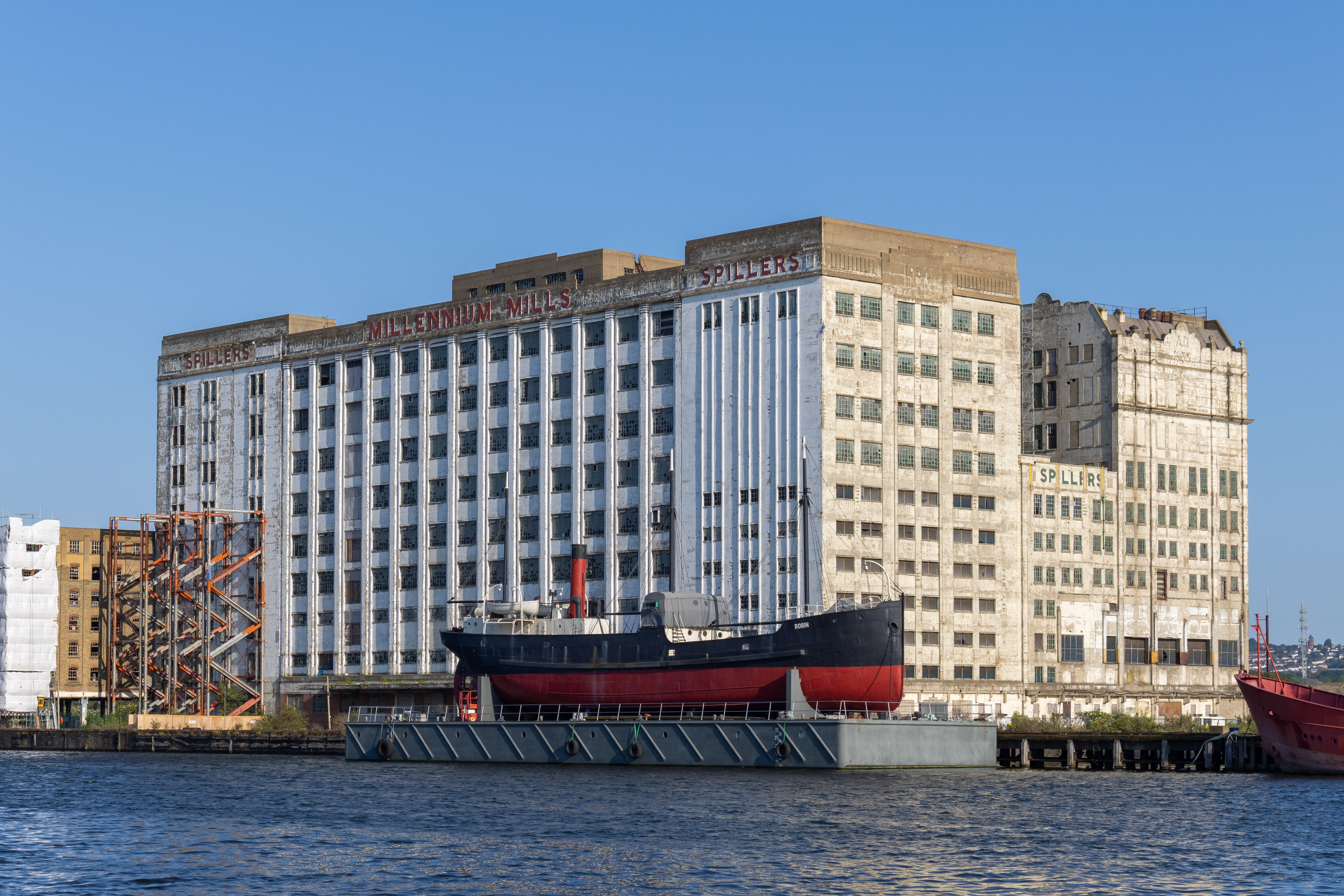
Millennium Mills in June 2023

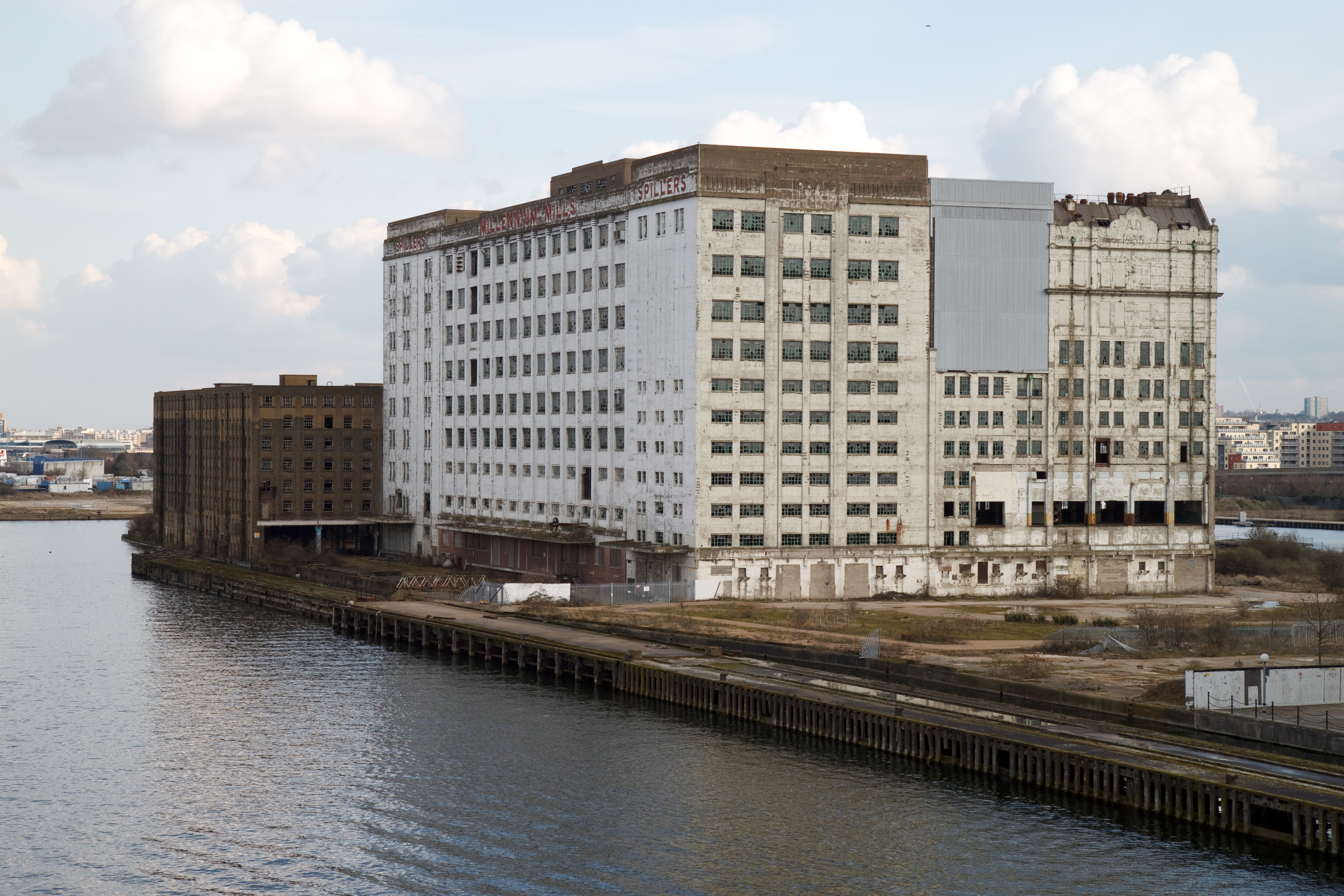
Millennium Mills viewed from the northwest. The adjacent building on the left is the former Rank Hovis Premier Mill

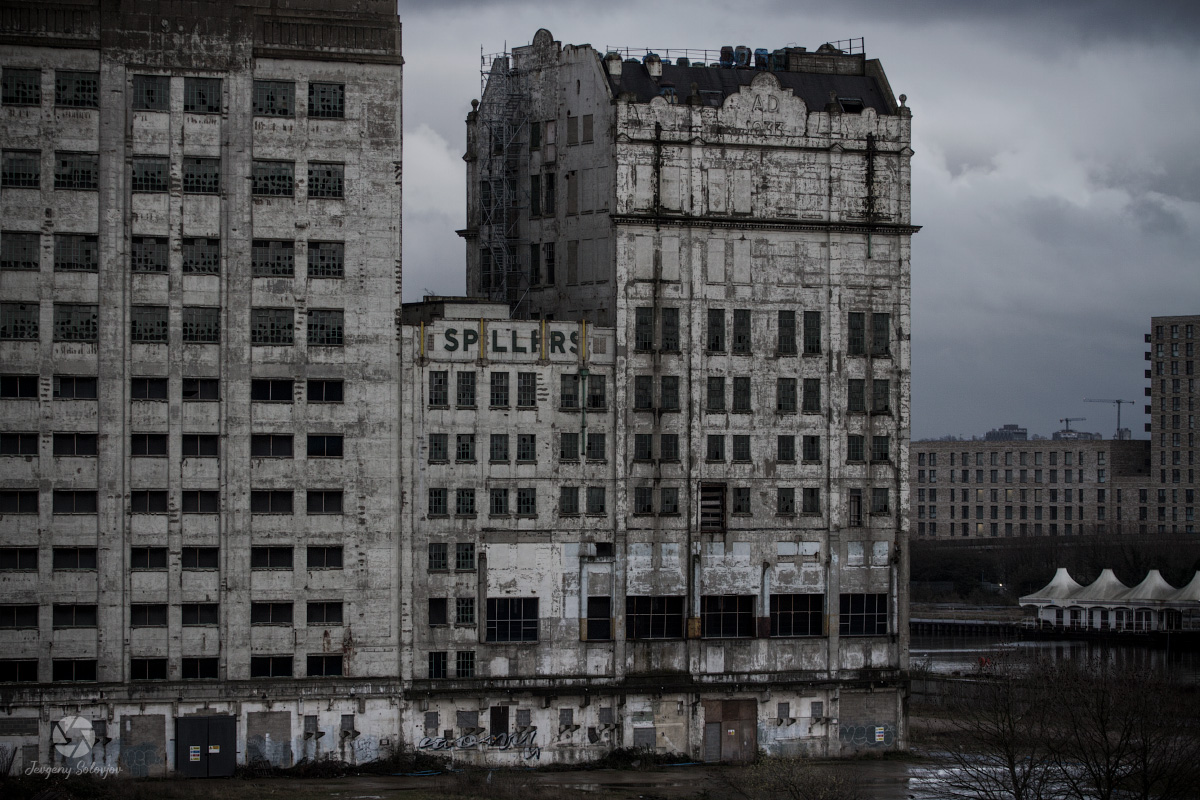
Millennium Mills, London, United Kingdom, 2018

The Millennium Mills is a derelict flour mill from the turn of the 20th century in West Silvertown on the south side of the Royal Victoria Dock, between the Thames Barrier and the ExCeL London exhibition centre alongside the newly built Britannia village, in Newham, London, England. The Mills are currently undergoing a major renovation as part of a £3.5 billion redevelopment of Silvertown.

Along with Millennium Mills, there remains a small section of the now-destroyed Rank Hovis Premier Mill and a restored grade II listed grain silo, labelled the "D" silo. Described by the Evening Standard in 2009 as a "decaying industrial anachronism standing defiant and alone in the surrounding subtopia", the Millennium Mills has become a well-loved icon of post-industrial Britain and has made its way into many aspects of popular culture, being used as a backdrop in films and television shows such as Ashes to Ashes, London's Burning, and Derek Jarman's The Last of England. Millennium Mills is also a destination for Urban Explorers despite high security, dangers of structural weakness, ten-storey drops, and asbestos, and there are many reports and internal photos of the site.

== History ==
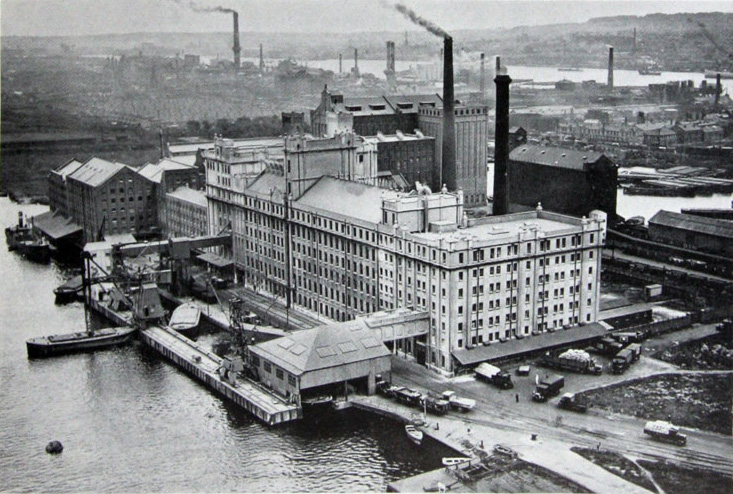
Rebuilt Millennium Mills, 1934

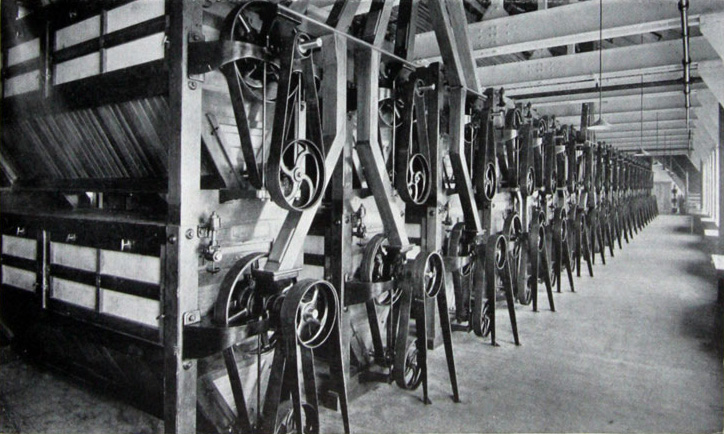
Main centrifugal dressing machine floor, Spiller's Millennium Mills, Royal Victoria Dock, London, 1934

During the early half of the 20th century, the Royal Victoria Dock became an essential part of industrial Britain and London's largest centre of flour milling. The rail and water transport links made it an ideal location for business as well as a centre for international trade and commerce. The Cooperative Wholesale Society (CWS) was the first of the large nationwide milling companies to establish a flour mill in the area, with the opening of the Silvertown confectionery in 1901. Joseph Rank Limited soon followed with the establishment of the Premier Mill at the Royal Dock in 1904. Vernon & Sons were the last to set up in the area when they built Millennium Mills. These mills, operated by Britain's three largest milling companies, converted imported grain from overseas into flour for the London market and were the first in the Port of London designed to take imported grain direct from the ships.

Millennium Mills was designed and built by millers William Vernon & Sons of West Float, Birkenhead, in 1905 with construction overseen by W.A. Vernon, the principal's son. The mills were extensive, featuring two plants, equipped by Henry Simon Ltd, that had a capacity of 100 sacks per hour. W.A. Vernon described the mills in a single word as "palatial". Vernon and Sons named the mill after their most successful product, a flour variety which they called "Millennium Flour" after winning the Miller Challenge Cup at the 1899 International Bakers Exhibition. The flour had been selected from "the best wheats of the world" and was put through a carefully designed industrial process. The victory gained Vernon and Sons "world-wide fame" and dominance in the English flour market. Millennium Flour was aimed at the rising 20th-century masses, proving particularly popular in the mining districts, where it was known to make "beautiful white bread sandwiches". The erection of Millennium Mills at the Royal Victoria Dock meant that this new flour could be brought to the Southern England market.

...from the flour mills, where several hundred girls had been at work, came flying showers of millions of tiny particles of light as though a sweeping storm of sleet had become incandescent. No doubt these tiny specks were the glowing ashes of a myriad grains of wheat carried up into the sky by waves of flame. It was like a golden rainstorm.

— JJ Betts, former fireman, account of the Silvertown explosion

All of these mills were partially destroyed in 1917 by the Silvertown explosion at Brunner Mond's munitions factory on the North Woolwich Road that was manufacturing explosives for Britain's World War I military effort. The Brunner Mond works was about 100 yards east of where Millennium Mills stood, and the adjoining grain silos and flour warehouses were amongst the 17 acres (6.9 ha) of buildings that the Port of London Authority estimated were affected.

In 1920, Vernon & Sons was taken over by Spillers Limited at which time the Millennium Mills was acquired. Spillers was an established flour milling business founded in 1829, which subsequently went into the production of dog food and animal feeds by 1927. The Spillers name remains prominent on the east and west wings of the building.

Millennium Mills was rebuilt as a 10-storey concrete art deco building in 1933.

Many port mills throughout the country sustained severe damage from bombing in the Second World War; almost 75% of the national capacity was concentrated at the ports, which made them primary targets for air attacks. In London, Spillers' Millennium Mills as well as Rank's Premier Mills were substantially destroyed. Between 1945 and 1950 the ports underwent large-scale post-war reconstruction despite a deficit of raw materials and strict licensing. At this time Millennium Mills was rebuilt, including a windowless steel-framed infill on the west side, and was in operation by September 1953.

== Closure and early restoration attempts ==
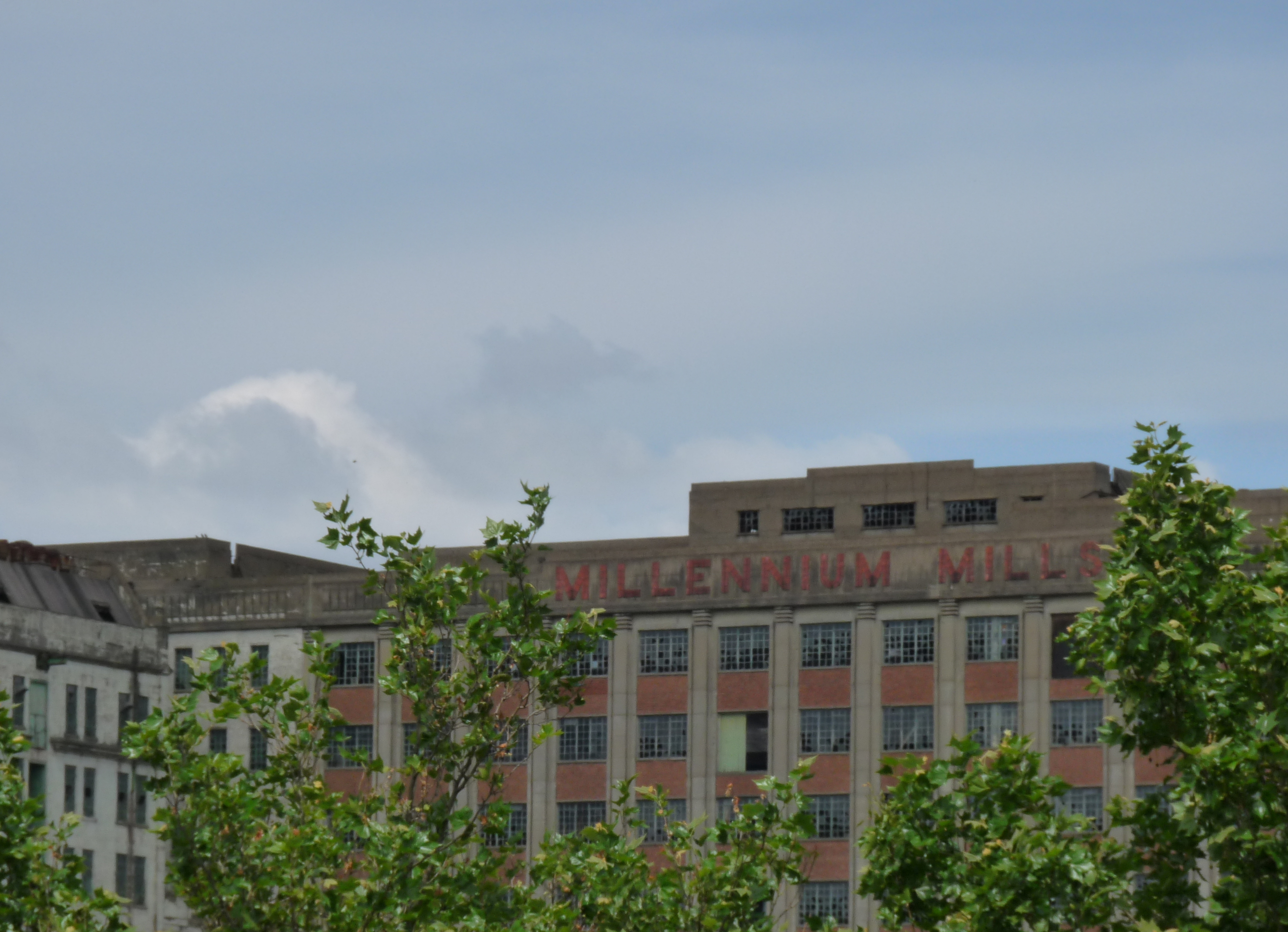
Millennium Mills frontage in 2009

The Royal Docks closed in 1981, and many businesses relocated to Tilbury. The London Docklands Development Corporation (LDDC) was in discussion in the 1990s with the Zoological Society of London for a public aquarium on the site of the former CWS mill, but funding for it was difficult to find and the idea was eventually shelved. The Rank and CWS mills were demolished by the LDDC in the 1990s, along with the Millennium Mills' B and C silos. The D silo to the south is Grade II listed. Millennium Mills itself is locally listed by Newham Council.

In 2001, a project was proposed for the redevelopment of the former docklands area with a planning request being submitted to the Local Authority in 2003. By 2007, a £1.5 billion building scheme had been approved to convert the 24 hectares (59 acres) site into a mixed use development with residential, commercial, leisure, and public areas. It was estimated that the scheme would be one of the largest urban regeneration projects in Europe, creating 2,000 jobs. The scheme was set to deliver 4,900 waterfront homes, with the intention of converting the Mills themselves into 400 luxury loft-style flats called Silvertown Quays. The development was also to include a new aquarium for London called Biota!, designed by Terry Farrell and Partners. The building scheme was supported by a partnership between the landowner, the London Development Agency (LDA), joint developers Silvertown Quays Limited (SQL) and the Japanese developer Kajima Urban Development International with financial backing by the Bank of Scotland. The first phase of the redevelopment was to see the Millennium Mills building developed into flats, with the demolition of the eastern and western wings, including the remains of the Rank Premier mill, leaving the main block of Millennium Mills, plus the south-western extension as a standalone tower. Planning approval was granted in 2007. However, no date was decided for work to commence.

Like a booby-trapped House of Horrors, danger awaits their every step in Millennium Mills. The rotten floors are comparable to thick slices of Emmenthal, riddled with pigeon faeces and yawning holes (where machinery has been removed) that drop eight or nine storeys in some places.

— Christian Koch, "Urban explorers – the thrillseekers infiltrating unseen London"

In 2009, the LDA, having seen no progress on the project, served termination notices to the SQL, setting a deadline of the 13 February 2010 for the company to secure sufficient funds for the project. When the termination notice expired and the funds were unable to be raised, the LDA ended their agreements with the SQL, and the Silvertown Quays development was officially cancelled. Despite discussion with SQL's main backer, the Bank of Scotland, and a new plan and revised timetable for the regeneration of the site, the London Development Agency concluded that it could not accept the new proposals. Architects Journal suggested that the area could be incorporated into a larger masterplan for the docks as part of a wider Royal Docks masterplan housing up to 30,000 people.

Around 2011, the building remained derelict and was a destination for urban explorers who entered the site at high risk. There are many reports and internal photos of the site in this state.

The Millennium Mills and Silo D site area was redeveloped as the London Pleasure Gardens and opened in 2012 to coincide with the London Olympics. Due to remain open for 3 years hosting music and arts events, the site encountered difficulties from its initial opening with negative reviews labelling the site as unfinished and unsafe with some of the advertised buildings absent and the area mostly devoid of greenery. Later events such as the Bloc Festival suffered from overcrowding, and the planned number of visitors coming from the ExCeL London exhibition centre during the Olympics never materialised. The site subsequently went into administration after only 5 weeks, costing Newham council £4 million.

== Redevelopment ==
On 21 April 2015, Newham Council gave planning permission to The Silvertown Partnership for a new £3.5 billion redevelopment of the area, including Millennium Mills. The building will become a centre for start-up businesses. Part of Pontoon Dock itself will be filled in so that the land can be developed.

Work began in January 2015 to clear the building of asbestos, following an initial £12 million grant from the government. To mark the grant, communities minister Penny Mordaunt MP and the deputy mayor of London for housing, Richard Blakeway paid a visit to the 62-acre (25-hectare) site. Speaking on the site, Mordaunt said: "There will be a lot of people working here who will be able to live in the area. This iconic building will be the centrepiece of a thriving new business district that will create thousands of new jobs and bring prosperity back to the docks."

The Mayor of London Boris Johnson said of the renovation: "The restoration of this great industrial monolith is another vital ingredient in the regeneration of London's historic Royal Docks. We want to return this site to its former glory, supporting business and enterprise and breathing new life into an area of the capital that has been dormant for decades."

In September 2015, the mills were open to the public as part of the Open House London weekend in which visitors were able to tour the sixth floor of the East wing, tenth floor of the main building, the East rooftop, and the Rank Hovis mill. As of September 2015, the Millennium Mills have been cleared of internal machinery and grain chutes which posed an asbestos risk, though the removed artefacts are planned to be donated to artists to use.

== Popular culture ==
The location has featured in various media. In 1985, the former CWS mill nearby was used in the Terry Gilliam's dystopian film Brazil. The interior featured as the Department of Records, a vast clerks pool where the character Sam Lowry worked, and the deserted corridors of the Expediting Department; the grim passageways and stairwells, as well as the exterior, served as Shangri La Towers, the Buttle family's tower block.

=== Derek Jarman's The Last of England ===
In 1987, British film-maker Derek Jarman released his self-shot avant-garde film The Last of England, which featured Millennium Mills as a key location. There was only one week of formal shooting for the film, which occurred in November at the Royal Docks, an area Jarman described as "miles of desolation with the odd post-modern office building." In one scene it shows characters dancing on the roof of the empty Millennium Mills building.

British writer and psychogeographer Iain Sinclair talks about the use of Millennium mills in Derek Jarman's film, describing it as having "been christened by William Blake and delivered by Albert Speer", the English Romantic poet and Adolf Hitler's chief architect. Sinclair goes on to call the mills "the perfect symbol for a cinematic endgame." In another piece of writing, Sinclair analyses Jarman as a man who "saw the downriver reaches of Silvertown, with its abandoned flour mills, as a site for dervish dances and the rituals of a punk apocalypse."

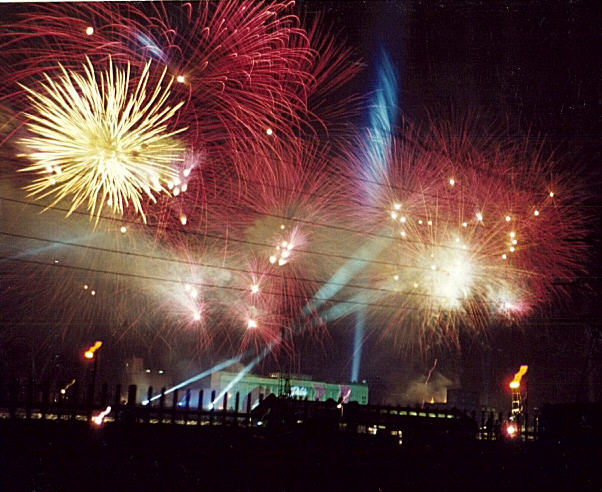
Millennium Mills as a backdrop to the spectacular lighting and fireworks at the concert

=== Jean-Michel Jarre's Destination Docklands ===
Jean-Michel Jarre had the Millennium Mills painted white as a surface for projection of lighting effects for his 1988 show Destination Docklands. It formed one side of the backdrop, with the CWS mill in the centre and a screen supported by scaffolding on the other side. The concert coincided with the release of his album Revolutions which dealt with the theme of the Industrial Revolution and the transition to the Information Age, themes that resonated with the abandoned docklands; Jarre described the event as "a concert dealing with architecture".

=== Other media ===
Millennium Mills was a recurring filming location for the British TV series Ashes to Ashes (2008–2010). It appears as one of the first locations in the series in Episode 1. The show is set in the 1980s, and using the Mills sets the scene for the London landscape of the show before the construction of the Millennium Dome dominated the East London skyline. At the start of the 1980s the industrial East End had yet to start its transformation at the hands of the London Docklands Development Corporation, which was founded in 1981.

The mills appear as the setting for the "Abandoned Mill" mission in Splinter Cell: Blacklist, although the game names them as "Lansdowne Mills".

Millennium Mills was used as a location in the 2010 film Green Zone where the "desolate East London mill" provides the setting for Saddam Hussein's maze of tunnels and bunkers, and in the 2012 urban thriller film Twenty8K.

The mills also appear as the setting for a number of music videos, including "Ask" by The Smiths (1986) filmed by Derek Jarman on the north side of Royal Victoria Dock, "Charmed Life" by Mick Jagger (1993), "The Box" by Orbital (1996) featuring Tilda Swinton, "Fluorescent Adolescent" by the Arctic Monkeys (2007), "Take Back the City" by Snow Patrol (2008), "Build A Fire" by Lamb (2011), and "Every Teardrop Is a Waterfall" by Coldplay (2011).

In 2013, the Millennium Mills was used to shoot scenes for the movie adaptation of The Man From U.N.C.L.E. It was also used for Danny Boyle's 2013 film "Trance".

The Millennium Mills also appeared in the 2017 live-action animated comedy film Paddington 2.

In 2018, the Millennium Mills was used to shoot scenes for the TV series Informer.

In 2022, it appeared in the film The Batman by Matt Reeves.
