= Andrea Angel =

British chemist

Andrea Angel EM
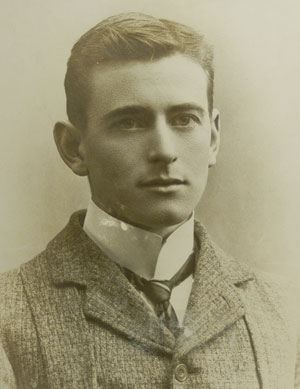
- Portrait photograph of Angel
- Born: 9 January 1877; Bradford, Yorkshire, England
- Died: 19 January 1917 (aged 40); Silvertown, London, England
- Cause of death: Silvertown explosion
- Resting place: East London Cemetery
- Education: Christ Church, Oxford
- Spouse: Mary Letitia Stock (1904)
- Children: 2, including Heather
- Awards: Edward Medal
- Scientific career
- Fields: Chemistry
- Institutions: Brasenose College, Oxford; Keble College, Oxford; Christ Church, Oxford

Andrea Angel (1877–1917) was a British chemist who died accidentally in the Silvertown explosion.

== Life ==
Andrea Angel was born on 9 January 1877 in Bradford, Yorkshire, England. His father was Thomas Angel, a tax supervisor, and his mother was Angelina. He attended Exeter School and then won an exhibition (scholarship) to study chemistry at Christ Church, Oxford, gaining a first-class degree in 1899. Subsequently, he became a lecturer in Oxford at Brasenose College, Keble College, and then Christ Church, running the chemistry laboratory there.

At the start of World War I in 1914, Angel wished to join the army, but with his chemistry expertise applicable to the manufacture of munitions, he was not allowed to enlist. Instead, he joined the Brunner Mond Company to help with work for the Ministry of Munitions. In 1915, he was appointed Chief Chemist and oversaw the purification of the explosive TNT in a former caustic soda factory at Silvertown, East London. A fire started in the evening of 19 January 1917. George Wenborne notified Angel, who urged the factory workers to flee for safety while he, with others, tried to extinguish the fire. However, after only a few minutes, there was a very large explosion involving around 53 tons of TNT. Angel was killed, along with 72 others. 94 people received serious injuries. It was the largest single explosion experienced in London.

In 1904, Angel married Mary Letitia Stock in Headington, Oxford, and they had two daughters, the younger of whom was an actress. From 1905 to 1917, they lived at Park Villas, at the south end of Banbury Road, Oxford. Initially, they were at no. 17 (1905–1912), and later at no. 15 (1912–1917). Angel was buried at East London Cemetery.

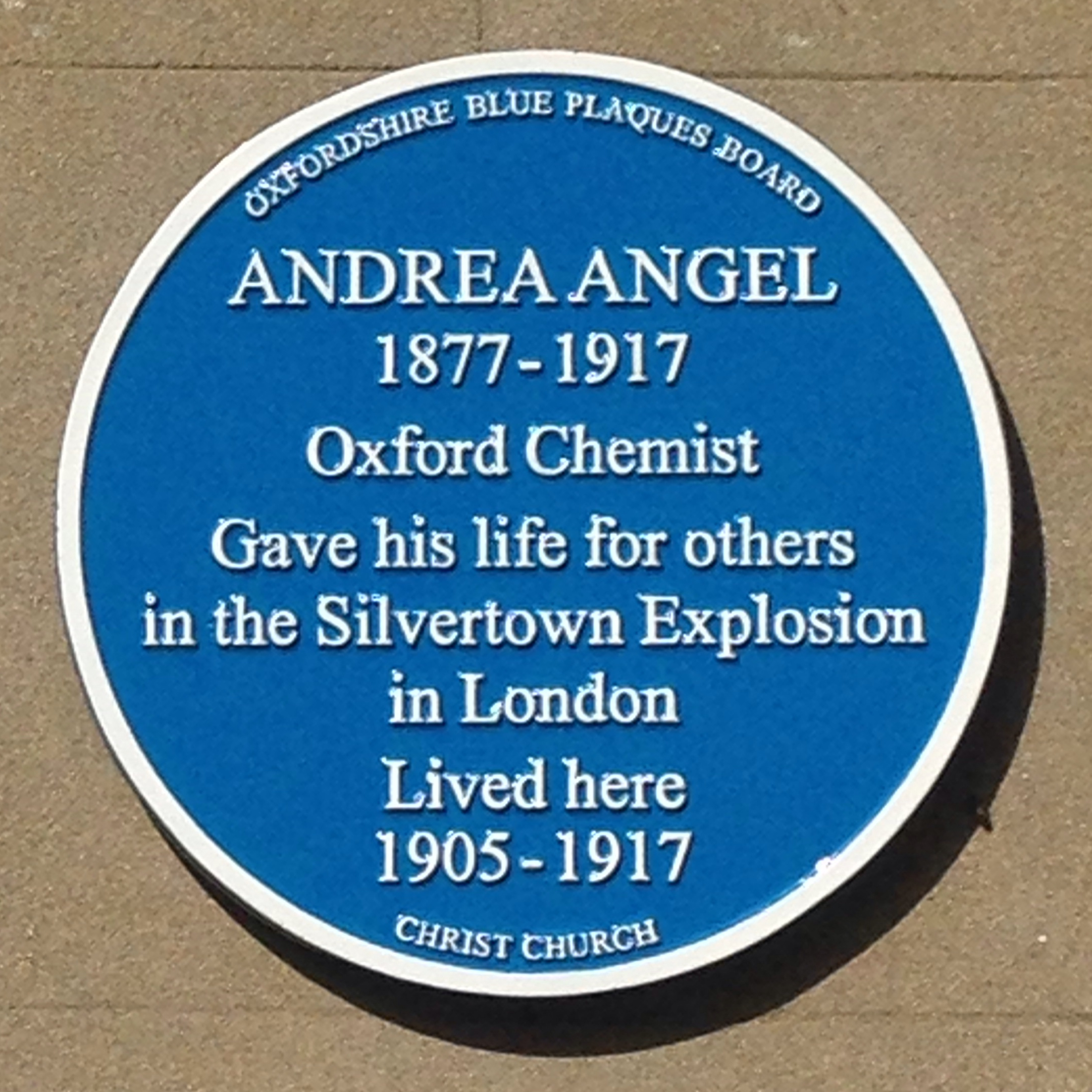
Blue plaque for Andrea Angel at 15 Banbury Road, Oxford

== Legacy ==
Andrea Angel and George Wenborne were posthumously awarded the Edward Medal (First Class), the highest civilian bravery honour (later the George Cross). Angel was also awarded a Carnegie Hero Fund Trust medal, an award started in 1908 in the United Kingdom for the recognition of civilian heroism.

In 2016, during its 175th anniversary, the Royal Society of Chemistry chose Angel as one of the 175 Faces of Chemistry. A blue plaque for Andrea was added to the house at 15 Banbury Road, Oxford, on 14 July 2018. After World War One, the house was occupied by another Oxford chemist, E. J. Bowen, and his family. The building is now part of the IT Services of the University of Oxford.

== Bibliography ==
- M. C. Grossel, A Hero of the Home Front (2016)
- Graham Hill & Howard Bloch, The Silvertown Explosion, London 1917 (2003)
