= Silvertown Quays =

Coordinates: 51.502222°N 0.031944°E

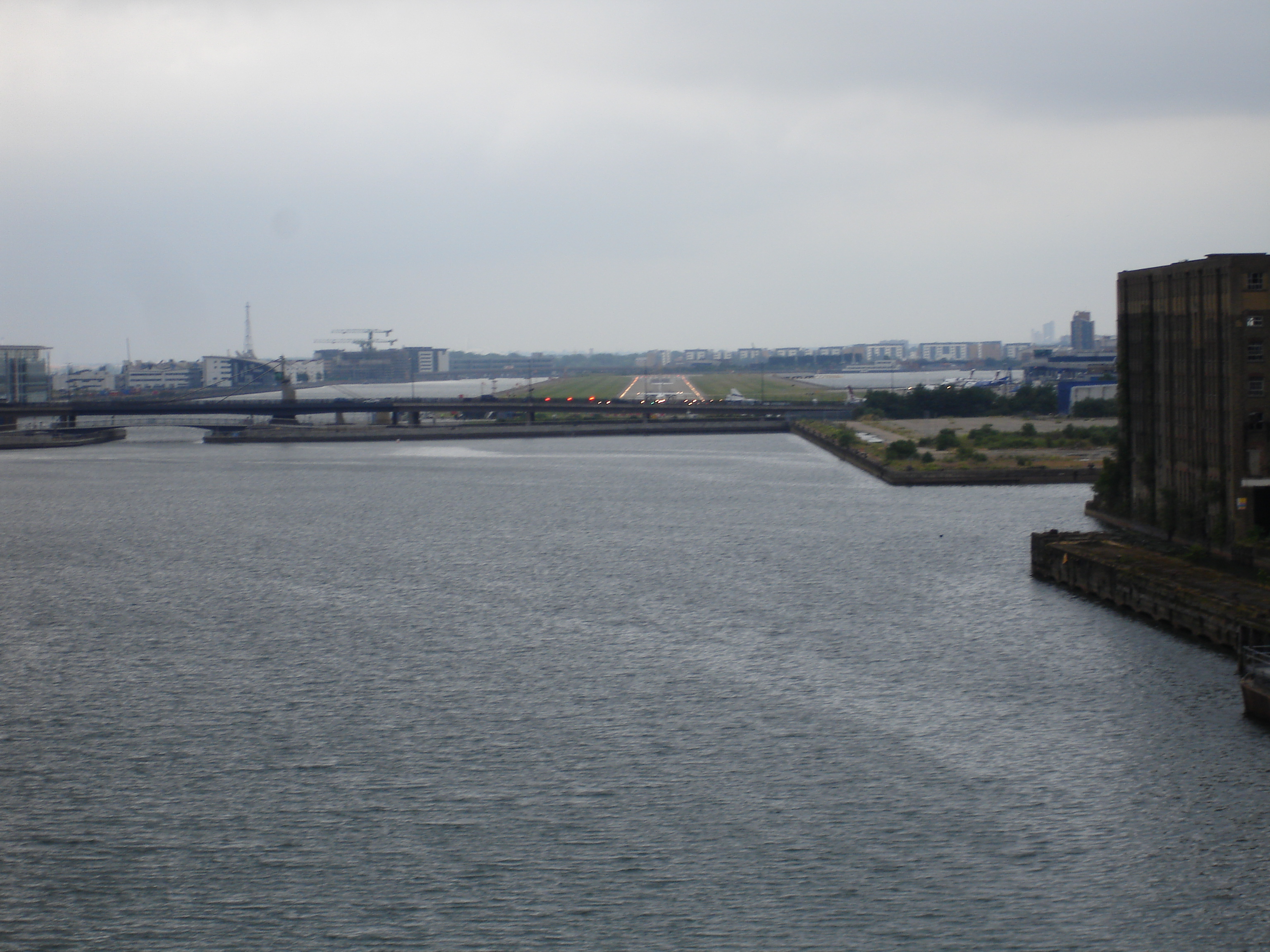
- Looking East along the Royal Victoria Dock, towards London City Airport and the Royal Albert Dock. Silvertown Quays is the area to the right beyond the warehouse building

- Location within Greater London
- OS grid reference: TQ410801
  - Charing Cross: 6 mi (9.7 km) WSW
- London borough: Newham
- Ceremonial county: Greater London
- Region: London
- Country: England
- Sovereign state: United Kingdom
- Post town: LONDON
- Postcode district: E20
- Dialling code: 020
- Police: Metropolitan
- Fire: London
- Ambulance: London
- UK Parliament: West Ham and Beckton
- London Assembly: City and East

Silvertown Quays is a redevelopment scheme of 50 acres (20 ha) of former warehousing in the East London district of Silvertown. It is situated in the London Borough of Newham on the northside of the River Thames, the southside of the Royal Victoria Dock on the opposite quay to ExCeL exhibition centre, and immediately west of London City Airport.

== Background ==
The Royal Docks are situated to the east of the City of London, at the intersection of the Thames Gateway and the London – Stansted – Cambridge growth corridor. They lie within the London Borough of Newham's "Arc of Opportunity", identified as a £22Bn development opportunity which runs from Stratford down the River Lea to its entry to the River Thames.

== Royal Victoria Dock ==
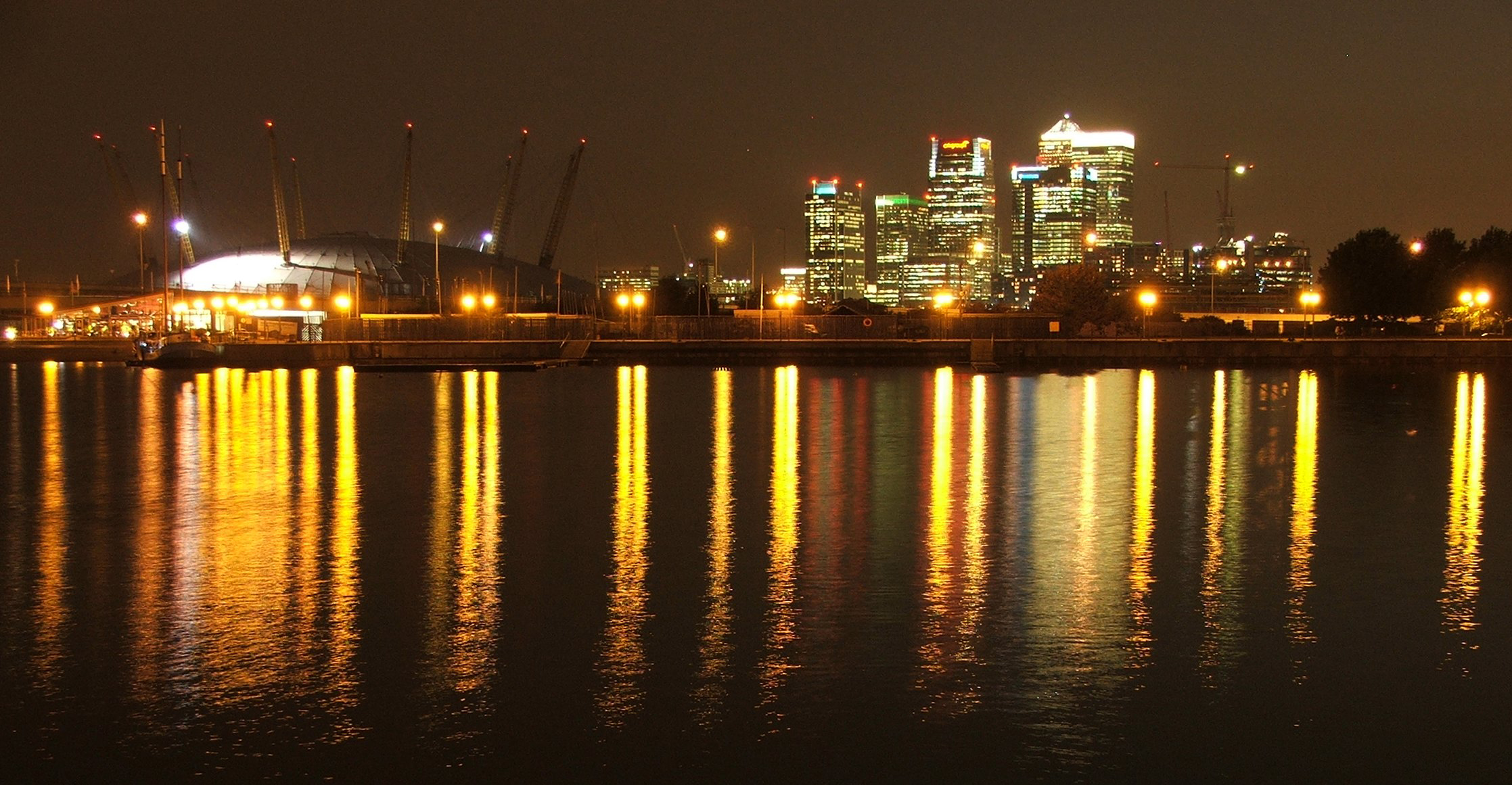
The O2 and Canary Wharf from the Royal Victoria Dock

=== Development ===
Opened in 1855 on a previously uninhabited area of the Plaistow Marshes, it was the first of the Royal Docks and the first London dock to be designed specifically to accommodate large steam ships. It was also the first to use hydraulic power to operate its machinery and the first to be connected to the national railway network via the Eastern Counties and Thames Junction Railway section of what is now the North London Line. It was initially known as "Victoria Dock"; the prefix "Royal" was granted in 1880.

=== Post 1945 ===
Post World War II and the run down of the docklands area from the 1960s, from the late 1980s onwards the Royal Victoria Dock experienced major redevelopment under the London Docklands Development Corporation. The dock itself still exists and is accessible to ships, although its western entrance has been filled in and it is now used chiefly for watersports. Its transport links have been greatly improved with new roads and Docklands Light Railway lines running along both its north and south side. Most of the original buildings were demolished but a few historic warehouses survived.

=== Present ===
The dock is dominated by the Royal Victoria Dock Bridge completed in 1998 and the ExCeL Exhibition Centre constructed on the north quayside and opened in November 2000.

== Southside redevelopment ==
Map 1908, showing Canning Town, Royal Victoria Dock, part of Royal Albert Dock. Both redevelopment phases lie on the southside of the dock, and extended to the North Woolwich Road/Docklands Light Railway: Phase1 (Britannia Village) is the west; Phase 2 (Silvertown Quays) lies to the east, centred around the Pontoon Dock (marked Graving Dock)

=== Phase1: Britannia Village ===
On the south side of the dock to its very western edge is the award-winning Britannia Village development, which included the high level footbridge. Commissioned by LDDC and carried out by Wimpey Homes, the Peabody Trust and the East Thames Housing Group between 1994 and 2000. Britannia Village has its own Community Foundation.

=== Phase2: Silvertown Quays ===
Covering the eastern area around Pontoon Dock and the Millennium Mills, the LDDC was in discussion in the 1990s with the London Zoological Society for a similar project on the site of the former CWS mill. However, government seed funding was difficult to find, and the idea was shelved.

== Redevelopment ==
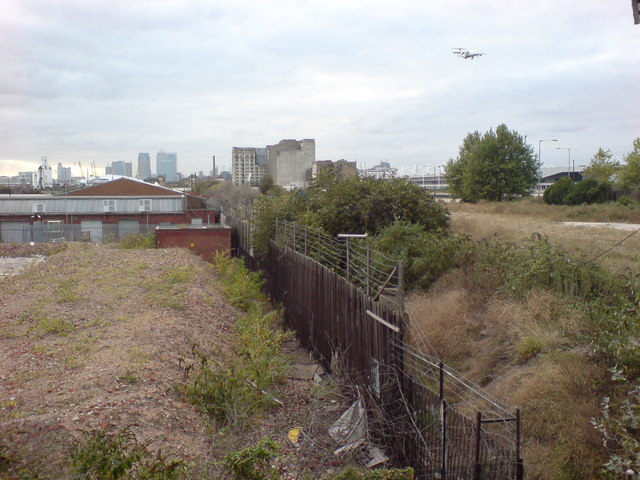
View looking west from Silvertown towards the Millennium Mills and over the proposed site of Silvertown Quays. A British Aerospace 146 can be seen approaching London City Airport

In 2001 a project was proposed for the redevelopment of the former docklands area with a planning request being submitted to the Local Authority in 2003. By 2007, a £1.5 billion building scheme had been approved to convert the 60 acres (24 ha) site into a mixed use development with residential, commercial, leisure and public areas. The scheme was set to deliver 4,900 waterfront homes, with the intention of converting the Mills themselves into 400 luxury loft-style flats, and also proposed to include London's new Aquarium designed by Terry Farrell and Partners, called the Biota aquarium. Estimated to create 2,000 jobs to promote regeneration in the area, the scheme was supported by a partnership between the landowner, the LDA, joint developers Silvertown Quays Limited (SQL) and Kajima Urban Development International, with financial backing by the Royal Bank of Scotland.

In 2009, the LDA, having seen no progress on the project, served termination notices to SQL, setting a deadline of 13 February 2010 for the company to secure sufficient funds for the project. When the termination notice expired and the funds were unable to be raised, the LDA ended their agreements with the SQL, and the scheme officially cancelled. The LDA then looked at incorporating the area into a larger masterplan for the docks, as part of a wider Royal Docks scheme housing up to 30,000 people.

In March 2012, the Mayor of London Boris Johnson announced that Chelsfield plc had been chosen by the LDA as preferred developer of the 50-acre site. Chelsfield, originator of the Stratford City redevelopment scheme, is partnered with Imagination Europe and First Base. The development will include 228,570 square metres (2,460,300 sq ft) of commercial and retail space, and 126,440 square metres (1,361,000 sq ft) of housing. Education, research and innovation centres will also be developed, as will pavilions where companies will be able to showcase products.

In January 2023, replacing the Chelsfield/Imagination proposals, Lendlease and The Guinness Partnership submitted plans for 6,500 homes (50% affordable) on a 20ha site in the Royal Docks, including refurbishment of the Millennium Mills building. The joint venture sought detailed planning permission for an initial development of 1,248 homes and 82,000 square metres (880,000 sq ft) of commercial space, and outline permission for the rest of the masterplan.

== Transport ==
Silvertown Quays is connected with the Docklands Light Railway (Pontoon Dock), the Jubilee line (Canning Town), the Emirates Air Line, London City Airport, and the Elizabeth line (Custom House).
