= Royal Wharf =

Residential and commercial development in the London Borough of Newham

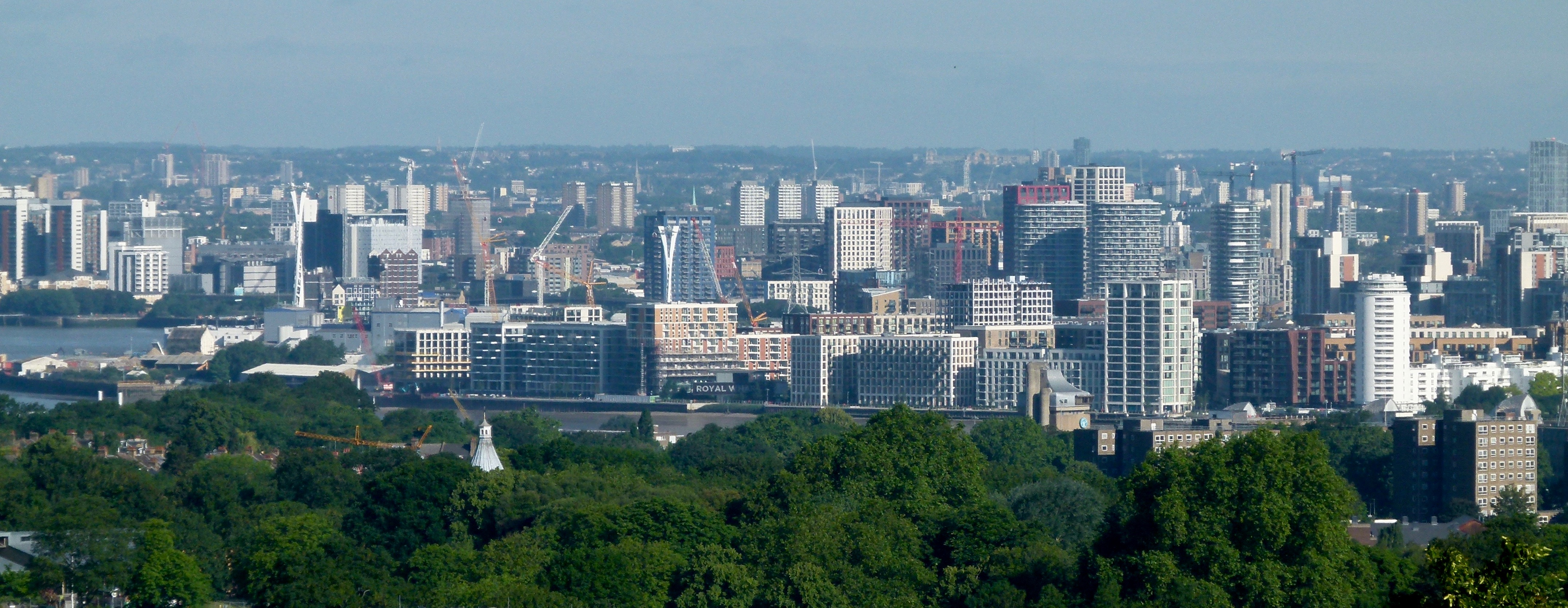
- View of Royal Wharf from Shooter's Hill in 2019

- Location within Greater London

General information
- Location: Silvertown, London, England
- Coordinates: 51.500667°N 0.029427051°E
- Construction started: July 2014
- Estimated completion: 2020

Technical details
- Grounds: 161,874 sq m

Design and construction
- Developer: Ballymore Group; Oxley Holdings Ltd

Other information
- Number of units: 3,385

Royal Wharf is a residential and commercial development in the Silvertown area of East London, England. It is located on the north bank of the River Thames in the London Borough of Newham and was built on the former site of Minoco Wharf. It is near the Thames Barrier, west of Thames Barrier Park, and close to both West Silvertown and Pontoon Dock DLR stations.

The development is a joint venture between Ballymore Group and Singapore-listed Oxley Holdings. It includes 3,385 residential units and 10,000 square metres of retail and commercial space.

== History ==
The 15.2-hectare (38-acre) site was originally developed as an industrial works at the end of the nineteenth century and was also used for the manufacture of TNT during the First World War. Following this, the site was used by Shell UK for a period as an oil storage and refining site. This came to an end in the 1990s, when the site was left vacant.

=== Silvertown explosion ===
Royal Wharf sits on the site of the Silvertown explosion, a large explosion at a munitions factory on 19 January 1917 which killed 73 people and injured more than 400, and caused substantial damage to the local area. As part of the development, the Silvertown War Memorial was relocated to Royal Wharf Gardens, in the centre of the development.

== Development ==
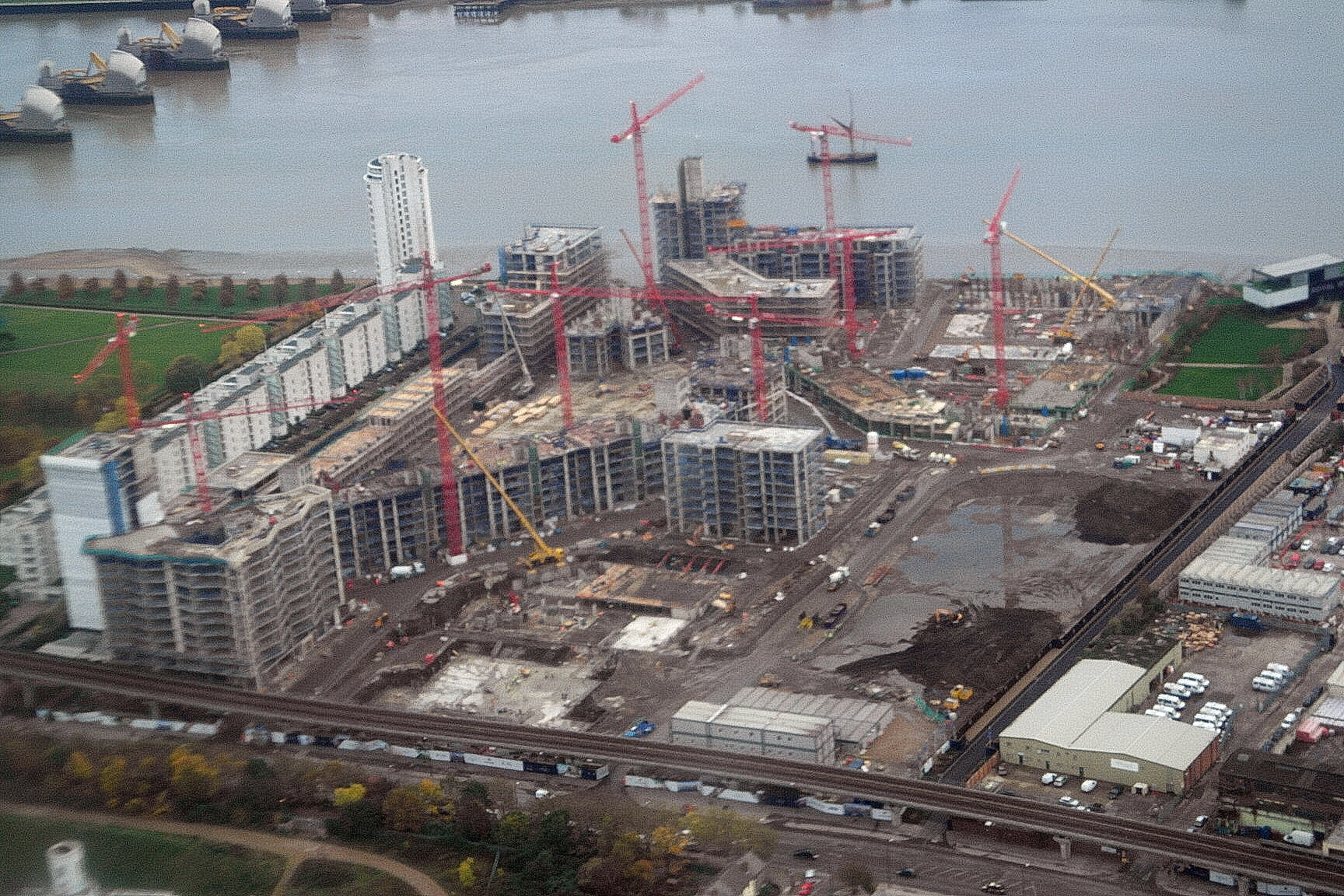
Royal Wharf construction site in 2015

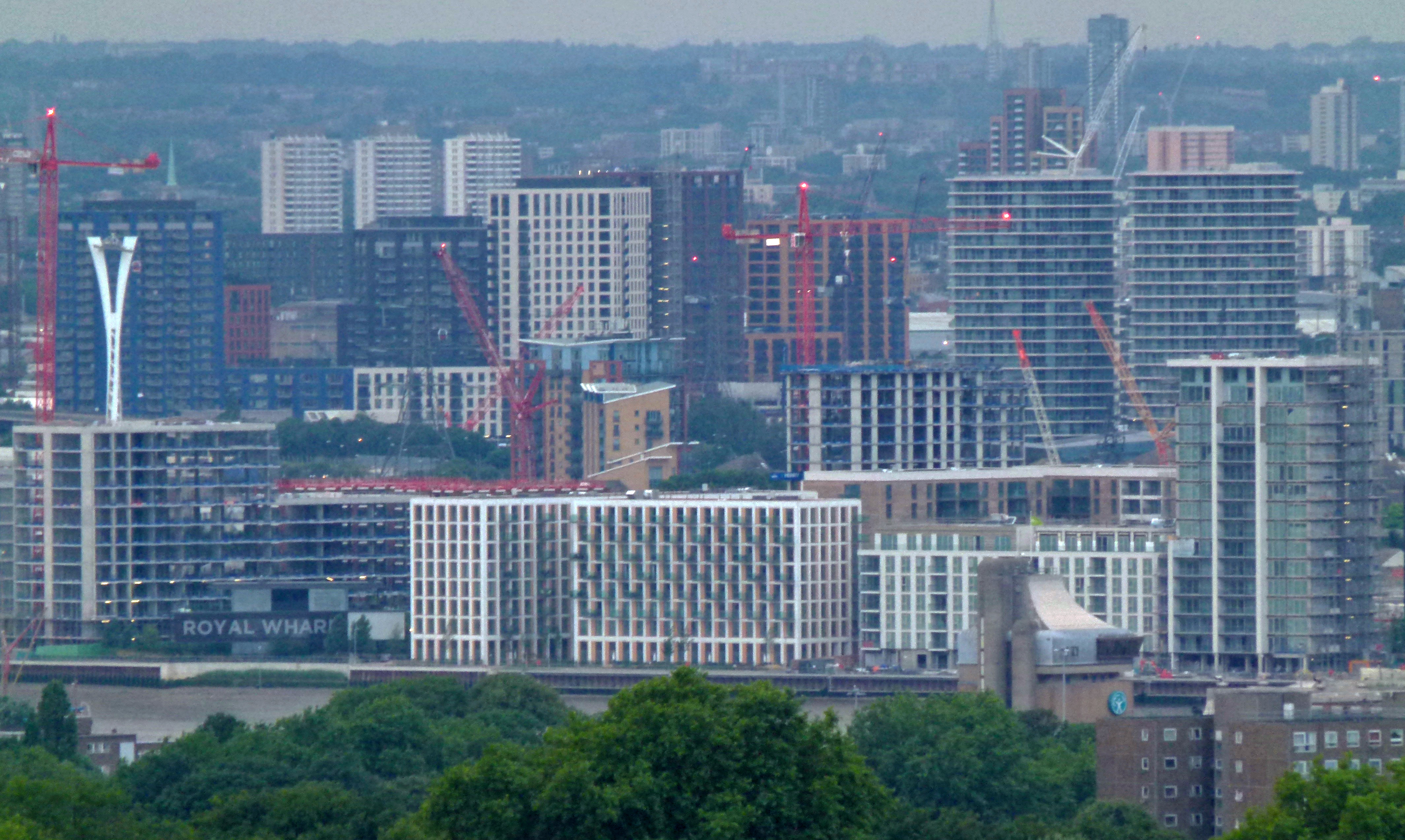
View of Royal Wharf in 2017

In 2012, following a comprehensive consultation process with Newham Council officers, the Thames Gateway Development Corporation and local community stakeholders (including local groups and individual residents), planning permission was granted to redevelop the site with a mixed-use scheme, delivering 3,385 new homes, a new primary school, leisure facilities and retail and commercial office space.

As of 2021, the development is nearly completed, with two blocks remaining. The Uber Boat by Thames Clippers riverboat pier and Royal Wharf Primary School opened in 2020. The estimated number of occupants once the development is fully complete is around 10,000.

Ballymore is also developing the adjacent riverfront site to the west, Riverscape, to provide 769 homes.

== Transport ==
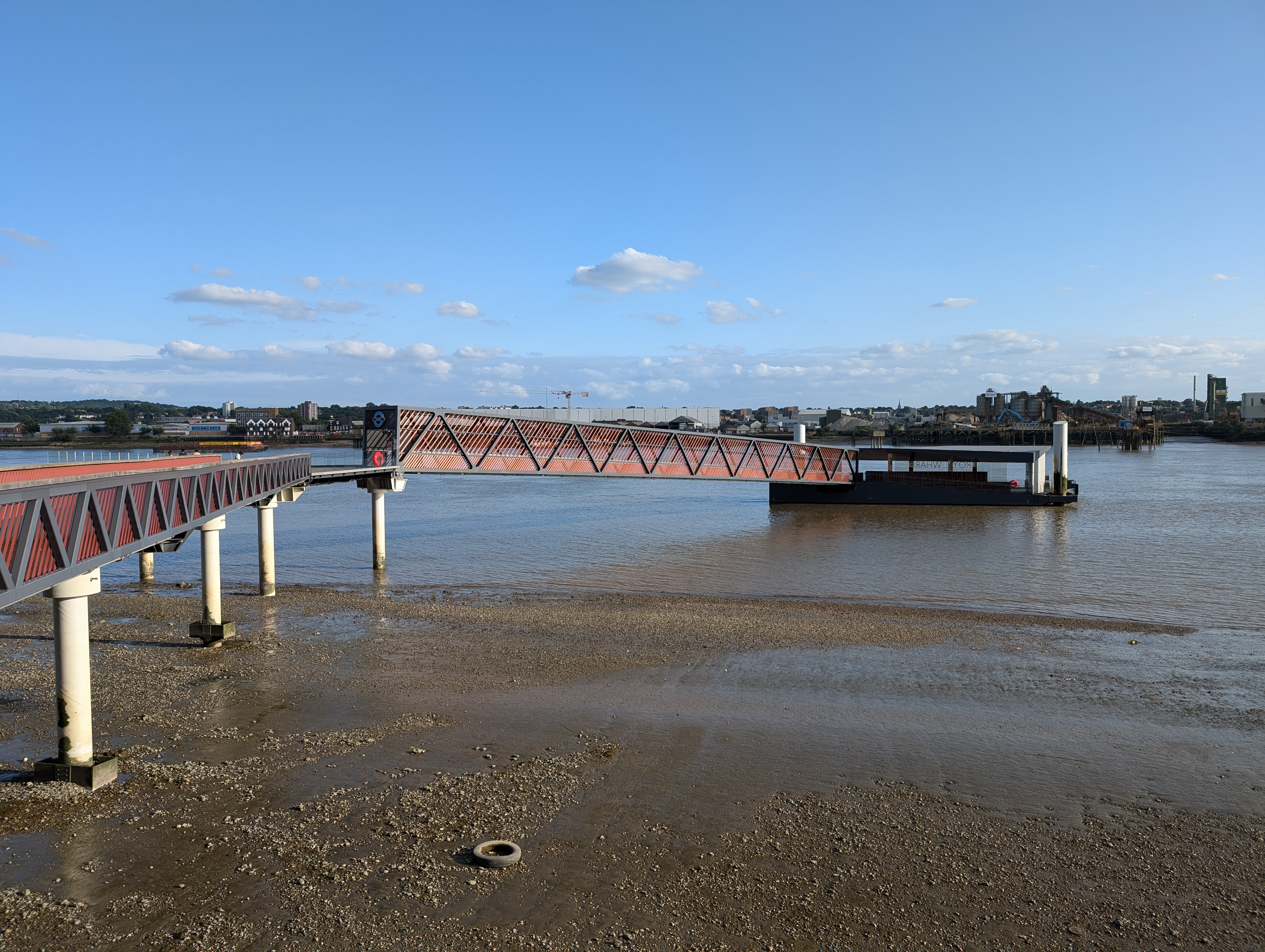
Royal Wharf pier

West Silvertown and Pontoon Dock are the nearest stations on the Docklands Light Railway. London bus route 241 serves the housing development.

The site is served by Uber Boat by Thames Clippers catamaran services from a new pier designed by Nex Architects. The service started on 18 October 2019 and of February 2020 is only served during peak hours.

Preceding station	London River Services	Following station
North Greenwich Pier towards Battersea Power Station Pier	RB1	Woolwich (Royal Arsenal) Pier towards Barking Riverside Pier
North Greenwich Pier towards Putney Pier	RB6	Woolwich (Royal Arsenal) Pier towards Barking Riverside Pier
