= Silvertown =

District of east London, England

Coordinates: 51.50°N 0.03°E

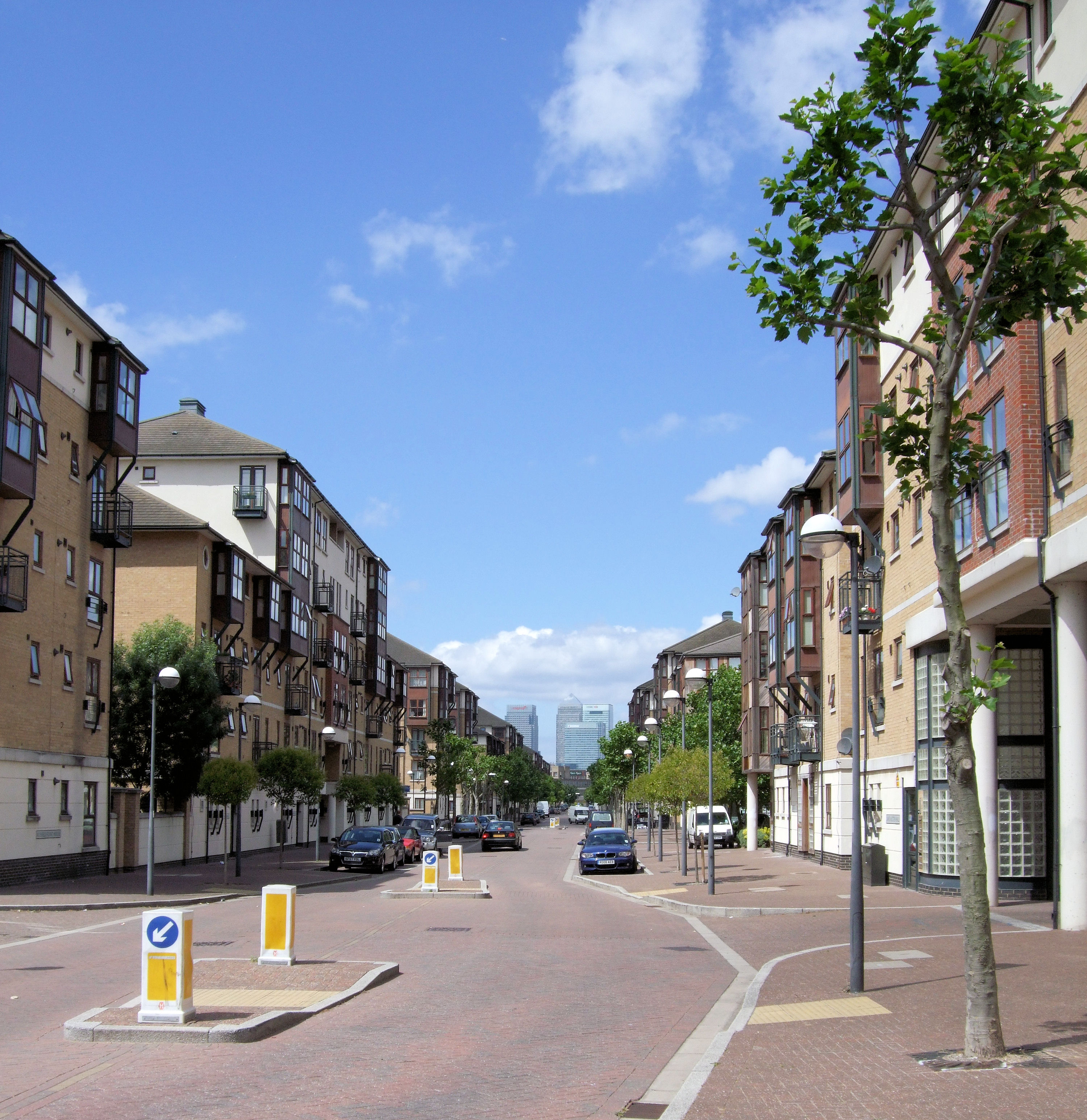
- Wesley Avenue in Britannia Village, a completed part of the Silvertown Quays redevelopment project.

- Location within Greater London
- OS grid reference: TQ415795
- London borough: Newham
- Ceremonial county: Greater London
- Region: London
- Country: England
- Sovereign state: United Kingdom
- Post town: London
- Postcode district: E16
- Dialling code: 020
- Police: Metropolitan
- Fire: London
- Ambulance: London
- UK Parliament: West Ham and Beckton
- London Assembly: City and East

Silvertown is a district in the London Borough of Newham, in East London, England. It lies on the north bank of the Thames and was historically part of the parishes of West Ham and East Ham in Essex, until it became part of Greater London in 1965. It forms part of the London E16 postcode district along with Canning Town and Custom House.

The area was named after the factories established by Stephen William Silver in 1852. The riverside of central Silvertown remains dominated by the Tate & Lyle sugar refinery, with residential developments being built to its east and west.

Central Silvertown features St Mark's Church (now Brick Lane Music Hall), London City Airport, and a community arts and creative space called The Factory Project. A £3.5 billion redevelopment of part of the district was approved in 2015, but largely stalled until a new deal was struck in 2026.

== History ==
The area was part of the ancient parishes of West Ham and East Ham, Essex, from the 12th century onwards.

In 1852, S.W. Silver & Company moved to the area from Greenwich and established a rubber works, originally to make waterproof clothing. This subsequently developed into the works of the India Rubber, Gutta Percha and Telegraph Works Company, which constructed and laid many submarine cables. By the 1860s a number of manure and chemical works and petroleum storage depots had been set up. In 1864, the area became an ecclesiastical parish of its own, centred on the church of St Mark's.

Sugar refiners in the area were joined by Henry Tate in 1877 and Abram Lyle in 1881, whose companies merged in 1921 to form Tate & Lyle. Prior to the merger, which occurred after they had died, the two men were bitter business rivals, although they had never met. Tate & Lyle still has two large refineries in the area.

In 1889, Silver's factory was the scene of a twelve-week-long strike by the majority of its 3,000 workers. The strikers were demanding higher pay and were inspired by the recent successes of New Unionism in the East End of London. Management refused to negotiate with the strikers who had immense popular support. Leading figures in the strike included Tom Mann and Eleanor Marx. The workers were eventually starved back to work, with many being victimised for their role. In the aftermath of the strike, Silver's declared a half-yearly dividend of 5 per cent. The rest of the industry congratulated Silver's management for holding a line against New Unionism.

On 19 January 1917, parts of Silvertown were devastated by a massive TNT explosion at the Brunner-Mond munitions factory, in what is known as the Silvertown explosion. Seventy three people died and hundreds were injured in one of the largest explosions ever experienced in the British Isles.

In the early 20th century the area suffered greatly from road congestion due to being located between the Thames and the Royal Docks, then the largest and one of the busiest dock groups in the world. The area was cut off for much of the time by lifting bridges over dock entrances and level crossings which were closed for up to three-quarters of each hour by train movements. This led in the early 1930s to the construction of the elevated Silvertown Way, one of the earliest urban flyovers.

On the first night of The Blitz, Tate and Lyle's sugar refinery, John Knight's Primrose Soapworks, and the Silvertown Rubber Works were all badly damaged by bombing.

Silver's was eventually taken over by the British Tyre and Rubber Co, later known as BTR Industries. The site closed in the 1960s and is now the Thameside Industrial Estate. Another major local employer was the Loders and Nucoline plant at Cairn Mills, a traditional port oleo industry and formerly part of Unilever. This originally milled seeds but later concentrated on production of fats from palm kernel oil.

=== Governance ===
Historically, the area was split between the parishes of West Ham and East Ham, in the Becontree Hundred of Essex. West Ham became a municipal borough in 1878, and East Ham an urban district in 1894. The County Borough of West Ham was created in 1900. Under the London Government Act 1963, East Ham and West Ham merged in 1965 to create the new London Borough of Newham in Greater London.

== Regeneration ==
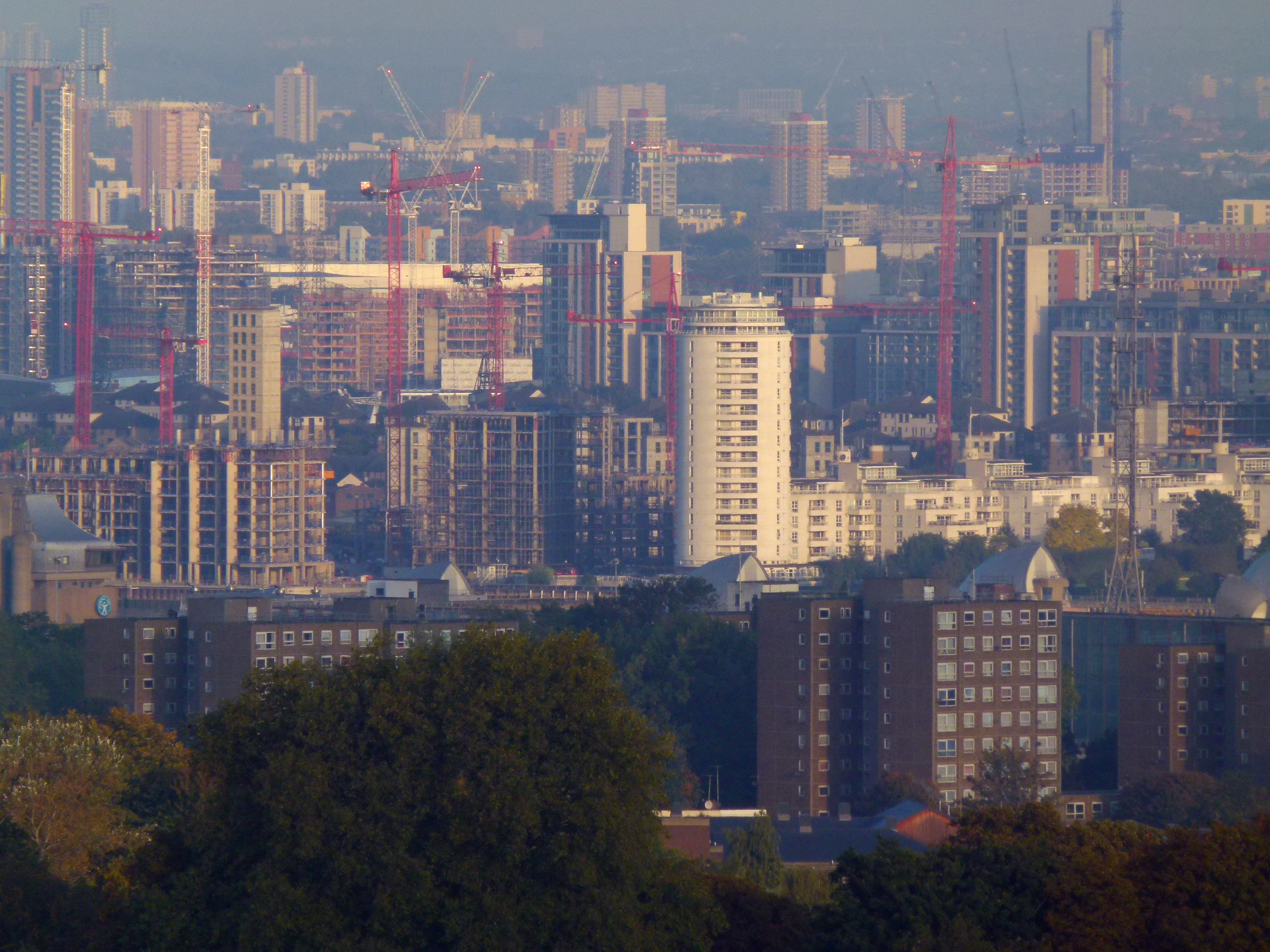
Construction in Silvertown (view from Shooter's Hill)

After the former mainline Silvertown rail station closed, the small former commercial area in central Silvertown suffered, with a loss of shops, a post office, a local social club, and a library. Of the numerous previous pubs in the area, only one now remains. Some small pockets of residential development occurred in the 1980s, however since then, little has been done to improve the historic centre of Silvertown, despite the arrival of the Docklands Light Railway (DLR), the Elizabeth Line and London City Airport.

In 2007, Prince Richard, Duke of Gloucester visited Silvertown, to formally open the new Silvertown Ambulance Station on North Woolwich Road.

=== West Silvertown ===
Further west, the residential area of Britannia Village was developed in the 1990s in what would come to be known as "West Silvertown".

=== Royal Wharf ===
Royal Wharf is a mixed-use, high density, managed neighbourhood built between 2014 and 2021. It is located between the River Thames and North Woolwich Road, and comprises three- and four-storey terraced houses, apartment blocks and towers, providing accommodation for about 10,000 residents. The development includes a 'high street' with retail units, together with open spaces and a primary school. A westward extension bordering Lyle Park was completed in 2025.

=== Barrier Point ===
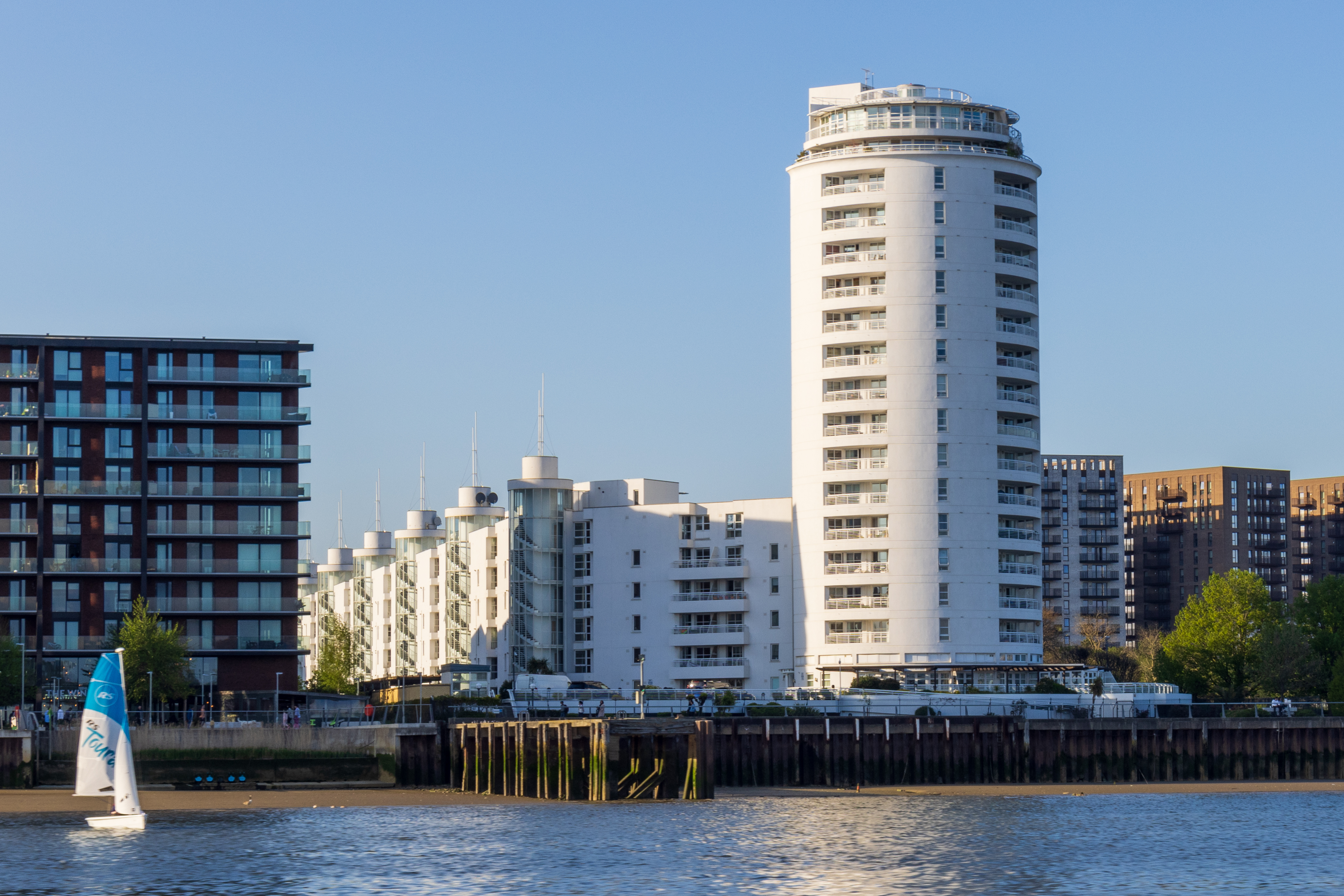
Barrier Point

Between Royal Wharf and Barrier Park is the white-rendered Barrier Point apartment development built in 2001 by Barratt and designed by Goddard Manton.

=== The Silvertown Partnership ===
In January 2015, the Mayor of London announced an initial £12 m of government funding to start work on demolishing part of former flour factory Millennium Mills and clearing it of asbestos. Prior to this latest development, the area was transformed in the 1970s by the construction of the Thames Barrier, an adjacent park, new housing areas and London City Airport. In the mid-1990s much of the business activity in the area was centred on the brewing firm Bass.

On 21 April 2015, Newham Council gave planning permission to The Silvertown Partnership for a new £3.5 billion redevelopment in the area. The 7 million square foot (650,000 m^{2}) development will provide offices, a tech hub, 3,000 new homes, restaurants, commercial buildings, local convenience retail facilities, a school, health centre and significant public realm for community use. It was predicted the regeneration would provide up to 20,700 new jobs and contribute £260m each year of gross value to the London economy. The redevelopment will include the restoration of Millennium Mills. A new pedestrian and cycle bridge will cross the Royal Docks to enable access to Custom House station for DLR and Elizabeth Line services.

However, development plans largely stalled until 2026. In June 2026, the Mayor of London Sadiq Khan invested £100m in the Silvertown Partnership, with plans expanded to include 7,000 new homes. In November 2026, Silvertown Homes signed a £2.7bn, 30-year development deal with the Greater London Authority to start a 5,000-home regeneration scheme, Thameside West, with UAE property firm Arada taking a stake in Silvertown Homes' parent company. The masterplan includes a seven-acre park, commercial space, a kilometre of new Thames waterfront and a new Thames Wharf DLR station. The full development programme could extend into the 2040s.

== Education ==
Oasis Academy Silvertown has provided secondary education in the area since 2014. In 2023, the school relocated from initial accommodation on Rymill Street, North Woolwich to the former site of Silvertown fire station on North Woolwich Road, West Silvertown. It caters for 600 pupils.

== Maritime ==
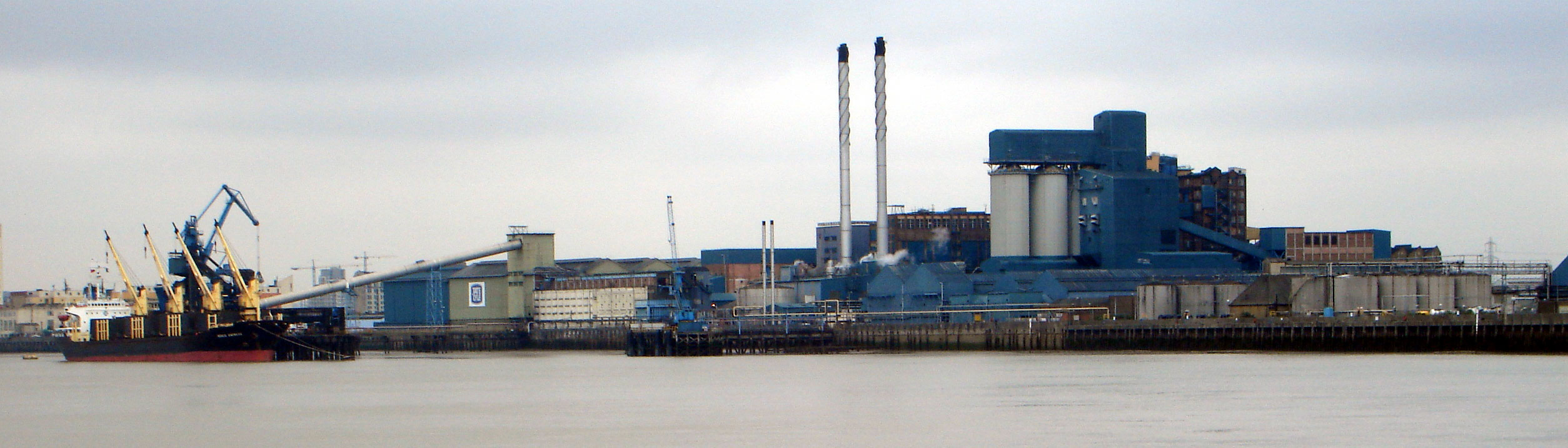
Tate & Lyle Silvertown sugar refinery

The Tate & Lyle Thames Refinery is a safeguarded wharf in the Port of London. It is one of the largest sugar refineries in the world, with a capacity of 1.2 million tonnes per annum. The Raw Sugar and Refined and Shore Berth jetties include two bulk-handling cranes. The terminal commodities are sugar, as dry bulks, and edible and vegetable oils, as liquid bulks: it exports globally and imports from Fiji, Caribbean, Africa and South America.

== Transport ==
=== Docklands Light Railway (DLR) ===
Access to Silvertown was much improved by an extension of the Docklands Light Railway from Canning Town to Woolwich Arsenal, which opened on 2 December 2005. The nearest Docklands Light Railway station is London City Airport, with Pontoon Dock DLR station also nearby.

=== Underground/rail ===
Silvertown railway station on the North London Line was closed in 2006. A new London Underground Elizabeth Line station on the north side of the docks at Custom House opened in 2022. Built as part of the Crossrail project, it used the trackbed of the old North London Line, and provides direct services to and from central London, Essex and Heathrow Airport, plus interchange with the DLR. There is passive provision for a station serving Silvertown to be built in future, however as of April 2026 there is little indication that this will materialise, and parliamentary briefings have omitted mention. A new pedestrian and cycle bridge between West Silvertown and Custom House station is part of a £3.5 billion redevelopment plan for London's Royal Docks.

=== Cable car ===
The London Cable Car (terminus close to Royal Victoria DLR station) connects West Silvertown with the Greenwich peninsula (short walk to North Greenwich Jubilee Line and bus station).

=== Road ===
The Silvertown road tunnel under the Thames opened in 2025 and provides a toll tunnel route to the Greenwich peninsula. A free shuttle operates to carry people with bicycles through the Silvertown Tunnel. Cycle lane provision has been hampered by ongoing construction and road works, and cyclists generally must share the road with motor vehicle users.

North Woolwich Road runs east-west through Silvertown. Westward it joins Silvertown Way, which continues to Canning Town, while eastward it continues to North Woolwich. In 2025, a scheme designed to make North Woolwich Road up to Connaught Bridge more pedestrian and cyclist friendly was completed. A feature of the scheme is a series of rain gardens.

=== Air ===
London City Airport is located in central Silvertown.

=== Bus ===
Transport For London public buses that serve Silvertown include the 473 that runs from Stratford to North Woolwich and the 474 that operates from Canning Town to Manor Park (both make stops at London City Airport). Route 241 runs between Stratford and Pontoon Dock. Route 129 from Gallions Reach to Lewisham connects London City Airport via the Silvertown Tunnel to North Greenwich (including The O2 Arena).

=== Riverboat ===
The Royal Wharf development includes a landing pier for Thames riverboats.

== Parks and open spaces ==
=== Lyle Park ===
Lyle Park, on Bradfield Road near West Silvertown DLR station, is managed by Newham Council. It includes two floodlit tennis courts. The park was formally opened on 24 July 1924 by Sir Leonard Lyle, representing the firm of Abraham Lyle & Sons, who had gifted the land to West Ham County Borough. Within the park stand the entrance gates to the former Harland and Wolff factory on Woolwich Manor Way. The park widens out from the Bradfield Road entrance to form a larger rectangle with a frontage on the River Thames.

=== Royal Wharf Gardens ===
The gardens were laid out in 2016 as part of the Royal Wharf development. The Silvertown War Memorial has been relocated here.

=== Thames Barrier Park ===
Thames Barrier Park, close by Pontoon Dock DLR station, opened in 2000. It features a sunken 'green dock' with sculptured hedges, a remembrance pavilion and a cafe.

== Popular culture ==
Silvertown is featured in a ballad by Mark Knopfler, titled Silvertown Blues, which describes the area before redevelopment.

Silvertown was the name of a Men They Couldn't Hang album released in 1989. One song 'Blackfriars Bridge' mentions Silvertown.

The district also features in Charlie Connelly's 2004 book, Attention All Shipping. In the first chapter "Sea, Soup and Silvertown" the author describes his grandparents' flight from the area during The Blitz and the inspiration for the book. The docks and factories of Silvertown also provide the backdrop for his 2015 book Constance Street which traces the once thriving community through the lives of 12 women and their struggle for survival during the chaos of the war years.

Melanie McGrath's book Silvertown is a novelistic account of her grandmother's life in the area, where she and her husband ran a cafe.

The Sugar Girls, by Duncan Barrett and Nuala Calvi, tells the true stories of women who worked at Tate & Lyle's Silvertown factories, and features much detail on the area.

In Stephen Baxter's novel, The Massacre of Mankind, Silvertown is the site of a major munitions plant destroyed by Martian invasion, likely inspired by the Silvertown explosion.

== Notable people ==
- Frank Bailey (1925–2015), firefighter
- Lyn Brown, previously MP for West Ham until May 2024, was introduced to the House of Lords on 27 January 2025 as Baroness Brown of Silvertown
- Ezri Konsa, footballer for Arsenal F.C. and England national football team
