= Silvertown explosion =

1917 industrial accident in north-east London

Coordinates: 51°30′04″N 0°01′48″E

- The Millennium Mills following the explosion
- Date: 19 January 1917
- Time: 18:52 UTC
- Location: Silvertown, London
- Deaths: 73
- Injuries: More than 400

The Silvertown explosion occurred in Silvertown in West Ham, Essex (now part of the London Borough of Newham) on Friday, 19 January 1917 at 6:52 p.m. The blast occurred at a munitions factory that was manufacturing explosives for Britain's First World War military effort. Approximately 50 tonnes of trinitrotoluene (TNT) exploded, killing 73 people and injuring 400 more, as well as causing substantial damage in the local area. This was not the first, last, largest, or the most deadly explosion at a munitions facility in Britain during the war; an explosion at Faversham involving 200 long tons (200 tonnes) of TNT killed 105 in 1916, and the National Shell Filling Factory, Chilwell, exploded in 1918, killing 137.

== Operations ==
Silvertown explosion (Greater London)

The factory was built in 1893 on the south side (River Thames side) of North Woolwich Road, nearly opposite Mill Road) by Brunner Mond, a forerunner of Imperial Chemical Industries, to produce soda crystals and caustic soda. Production of caustic soda ceased in 1912, which left part of the factory idle. Two years into the war, the Army was facing a crippling shell shortage. The War Office decided to use the factory's surplus capacity to purify TNT, a process more dangerous than manufacture itself, although the factory was in a highly populated area. Despite opposition from Brunner Mond, production of TNT began in September 1915. The method used was invented by Brunner Mond's chief scientist F. A. Freeth, who believed the process to be "manifestly very dangerous". The plant continued to purify TNT at a rate of approximately 9 long tons (9.1 tonnes) per day until it was destroyed by the explosion.

Another plant, at Gadbrook, was built in 1916 and was producing TNT at a higher rate than the Silvertown factory, away from populated areas, with more stringent safety standards. Both factories were in full production.

== Explosion ==
On 19 January, a fire broke out in the melt-pot room, and efforts to put it out were underway when approximately 50 long tons (50 tonnes) of TNT ignited at 6:52 p.m. The TNT plant was destroyed instantly, as were many nearby buildings, including Silvertown Fire Station. Much of the TNT was in railway goods wagons awaiting transport. Debris was strewn for miles around, with red-hot chunks of rubble causing fires. A gas holder was damaged on Greenwich Peninsula, creating a fireball from 200,000 cubic metres (7.1 million cubic feet) of gas; the holder was later repaired and remained until 1986. Several thousand pounds' worth of goods were also destroyed in nearby warehouses, estimated by the Port of London Authority to cover 7 hectares (17 acres). The chancel and church hall of the local church, St Barnabas', were destroyed, being replaced only in 1926.

Seventy-three people were killed (69 immediately, and four later from their injuries), and more than 400 injured. Up to 70,000 properties were damaged, 900 nearby ones destroyed or unsalvageably damaged; the cost was put at either £250,000 or £2.5 million. The comparatively low death toll for such a large blast was due to the time of day. The factories were largely empty of workers (there were fewer than forty in the TNT factory itself), and it was too early for the upper floors of houses (which sustained the worst of the flying debris damage) to be heavily populated. Also, it occurred on a Friday, when fewer people were around the factory. However, several professional firemen and volunteers fighting the earlier fire were killed or seriously injured in the explosion. For comparison, 8 long tons (8.1 t) of TNT exploded at the National Shell Filling Factory, and killed 137 people; an explosion at Split Rock, New York, in 1918 killed 50 to 52 people with 1–3 short tons (0.9–2.7 long tons; 0.9–2.7 t) of TNT.

Reportedly, the explosion also blew the glass out of windows in the Savoy Hotel and almost overturned a taxi in Pall Mall, London, the fires could be seen in Maidstone and Guildford, and the blast was heard up to 100 miles (160 km) away, including at Sandringham in Norfolk and along the Sussex coast. Although the blast was heard at a great distance, it was not heard uniformly across the whole intermediate distance, owing to atmospheric effects caused by refraction of the sound waves.

== Response ==
The emergency services immediately became involved in putting out the fires caused by the explosion, treating the wounded, and beginning to repair the damage caused. First-aid stations were set up in the streets to treat minor injuries. A Salvation Army rescue team was sent into the area under Catherine Bramwell-Booth, and the YMCA also rendered aid, including food and hot drinks. Thousands were left homeless, requiring temporary accommodation in schools, churches, and other similar places. One thousand seven hundred men were employed in the reconstruction task by February. Three million pounds in aid was paid to those affected by the blast, equivalent to approximately £40m in 2007, of which £1m was paid to local businesses and factories, including £185,000 to Brunner-Mond.

The clear-up was under the direction of Sir Frank Baines, and a report in the Manchester Guardian of 12 February 1917 stated 750 to 1,000 men were on site. Six hundred houses had been demolished by the explosion and 400 new ones were being built. Three hundred others had been repaired, and many more re-slated.

Henry Cavendish-Bentinck and Alfred Mond, son of the eponymous Ludwig Mond of Brunner-Mond, debated in Parliament the living conditions of residents during the reconstruction; conditions were said to be "gravely prejudicial to the public health" and "not fit for human habitation". It was mooted that the residents should be relocated to a newly built garden city, rather than spending £1.3m rebuilding the present, dilapidated area. John Joseph Jones, MP for Silvertown, also maintained an interest in the disaster.

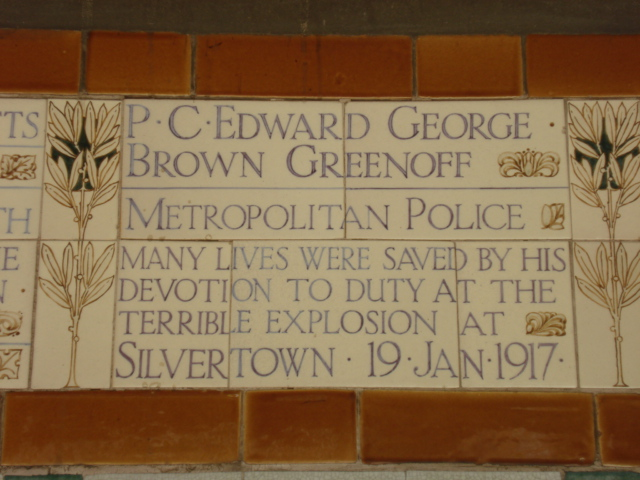
PC Greenoff's memorial plaque in Postman's Park

The Ministry of Munitions announced the explosion in the following day's newspaper, and ordered an investigation led by Sir Ernley Blackwell, published on 24 February 1917. A definite single cause of the explosion was not determined, invalidating early theories such as German sabotage or an air raid, but it was found that the factory's site was inappropriate for the manufacture of TNT. Management and safety practices at the plant were also criticised: TNT was stored in unsafe containers, close to the plant and the risky production process. The report was not disclosed to the public until the 1950s. Other newspapers, including The New York Times, also reported the explosion.

On 20 June 1917, Andrea Angel, the plant's chief chemist, who was attending to the initial fire, was posthumously awarded the Edward Medal (First Class) as was George Wenbourne. Police constable Edward George Brown Greenoff was posthumously awarded the King's Police Medal, and is commemorated with a plaque on the Memorial to Heroic Self-Sacrifice in Postman's Park, in central London.

The Silvertown explosion was not the final British munitions plant disaster of the First World War. The National Shell Filling Factory, Chilwell, in Nottingham, exploded on 1 July 1918, killing 137 and injuring 250.

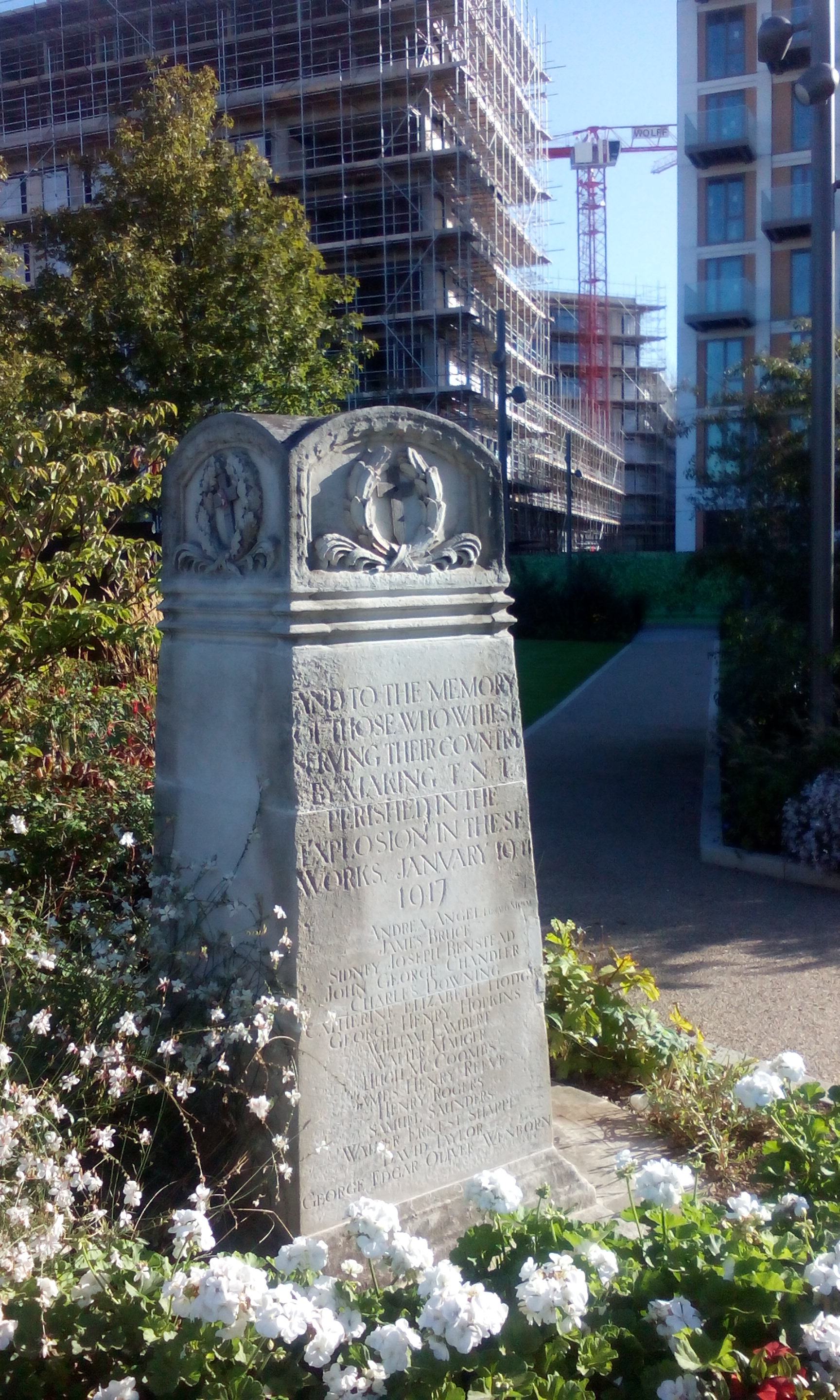
Silvertown War Memorial in its new location in the middle of the Royal Wharf development, 2016

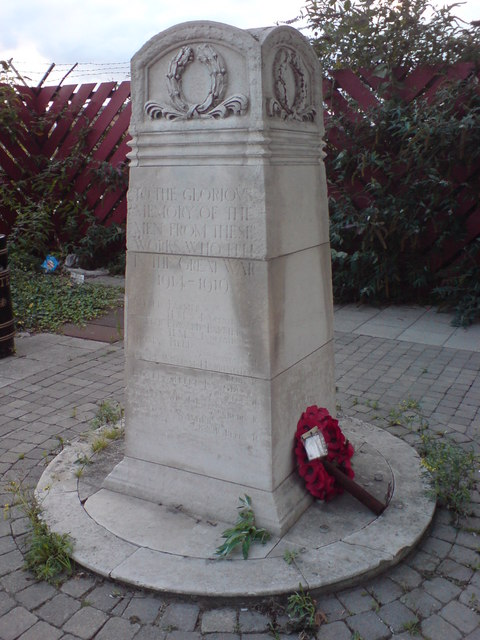
Silvertown War Memorial in its old location in 2009

The former TNT factory's grounds are, as of 2015, empty, not having been built upon since the explosion. The other part of the factory remained open after being repaired until it finally closed in 1961. This is also idle, as of 2015. A memorial was commissioned by Brunner Mond in the 1920s inside the entrance to the factory location; it also serves as a memorial for the First World War and Second World War. For a time, the memorial was covered up due to the development of Royal Wharf in Silvertown, but by September 2016 it had been moved to a new location in the Royal Wharf development, closer to the site of the explosion.

== Popular culture ==
The Silvertown Explosion is dramatised in the LWT TV series Upstairs, Downstairs (series 4, episode 9, "Another Year"). Scullery maid Ruby Finch had left her employer, the Bellamy family at 165 Eaton Place, to work in a munitions factory for the war effort. The explosion is not only heard at the home of her former employer in Belgravia, but it literally rocks the house. The residents can see a great fire in the distance, "down the river somewhere". Ruby makes her way back to the house and relates her account of being in the factory when the explosion occurred. She is in deep shock and her face is covered in a sulphurous yellow residue.

In Pat Mills's comic strip, Charley's War, the hero, Charley Bourne, is wounded on the Somme and returns home to Silvertown to be confronted by the aftermath of the explosion. Several subsequent strips depict a Zeppelin raid on the munitions factories in the area and deal with the residents' fears of a repeat of the disaster.

In the Charlie Higson Young Bond novel Double or Die, Brunner Mond is one of the cryptic clues, and reference is made to the explosion.

In A Study in Murder by Robert Ryan, the explosion blows in the windows of a hotel where Mrs. Gregson is dining, despite being located miles away from the factory.

Vera Brittain reports a curious effect of the explosion in her WWI autobiography, Testament of Youth: "Years afterwards a journalist friend told me that on the evening of this disaster she was working in her room in Bayswater when the drawn blind suddenly lifted without a sound, remained horizontal in the air for a moment or two, and then slowly dropped. There was no wind, and she had heard no noise. She said it was the most terrifying experience that she had ever been through."

In Juliet West's 2014 novel Before the Fall, the main character's best friend is a munitions factory worker who is badly burned in the Silvertown explosion.

== See also ==
- Largest artificial non-nuclear explosions

== Bibliography ==
- Sainsbury, Frank (1977). "Largest Wartime Explosions: Silvertown, London, 19 January 1917". After the Battle, 18, pp. 30–34. ISSN 0306-154X.
- Hill, Graham and Bloch, Howard (2003). The Silvertown Explosion: London 1917. Stroud: Tempus Publishing. ISBN 0-7524-3053-X.
