= List of Docklands Light Railway stations =

Map of the Docklands Light Railway network

The Docklands Light Railway (DLR) is an automated light metro system that serves the London Docklands area of east and south-east London. First opened on 31 August 1987, the DLR was a key component in the regeneration of large areas of disused industrial land into valuable commercial and residential districts.

The system has been extended multiple times, and now reaches north to Stratford, south to Lewisham, west to Tower Gateway and Bank in the City of London financial district, and east to Beckton, London City Airport and Woolwich Arsenal.

Stations are in the City of London and the boroughs of Newham, Tower Hamlets, Greenwich and Lewisham with the majority of the network north of the River Thames. Of the 45 stations, four are underground: Woolwich Arsenal, Island Gardens, Bank and Cutty Sark (for Maritime Greenwich).

== Stations and routes ==
Listed for each station is the branch or branches it is on, the local authority, the London fare zones in which it is located, interchanges with other modes of transport, the opening date and any resiting.

Four stations have direct interchanges with London Underground lines: Bank (Central, Circle, District, Northern and Waterloo & City), Canning Town (Jubilee), West Ham (Hammersmith & City, Jubilee and District lines) and Stratford (Central and Jubilee). There are indirect interchanges at Canary Wharf and Heron Quays (for Jubilee line from Canary Wharf), Bow Church (for District and Hammersmith & City lines from Bow Road) and Tower Gateway (for Circle and District lines from Tower Hill). There are interchanges with London Overground: the Mildmay line at Stratford (direct) and the Windrush line at Shadwell (indirect). There are interchanges with National Rail at Greenwich, Lewisham, Limehouse, Woolwich Arsenal, Stratford, West Ham and Stratford International.

== List ==
Station	Image	Local Authority	Zone(s)	Opened (Note: This only lists dates when the DLR stations or platforms opened.)	Other names (Note: Names listed here are those that were proposed before opening and any renamings.)	Usage (millions) (Note: Usage data is for 2023.)	Coordinates	Notes	Area served
Abbey Road		Newham	2 & 3	31 August 2011	–	1.34	51°31′55.20″N 0°0′14.4″E	–	West Ham
All Saints		Tower Hamlets	2	31 August 1987	Poplar High Street, East India Docks Road	1.81	51°30′39″N 0°00′47″W	On the site of Poplar (East India Road) station (1866–1944)	Poplar
Bank ( from Monument)		City of London	1	1 July 1991	–	37.20	51°30′46.80″N 0°5′16.80″W	Monument station first opened in 1884, Bank station in 1900.	City of London
Beckton		Newham	3	28 March 1994	–	2.18	51°30′53″N 0°03′41″E	–	Beckton
Beckton Park		Newham	3	28 March 1994	Albert Dock	0.52	51°30′32″N 0°03′18″E	–	Beckton
Blackwall		Tower Hamlets	2	28 March 1994	Preston Road	1.51	51°30′28.5″N 0°0′26″W	Near the site of Poplar railway station (1840–1926)	Blackwall
Bow Church ( from Bow Road tube station)		Tower Hamlets	2	31 August 1987	Bow Road	3.05	51°31′39″N 0°1′14.88″W	On the site of Bow railway station (1850–1944)	Bow
Canary Wharf		Tower Hamlets	2	November 1991	Canary Quay	12.71	51°30′18.36″N 0°1′15.24″W	Construction did not begin until after the original line opened, as the Canary Wharf development was not ready.	Canary Wharf
Canning Town (High Level)		Newham	2 & 3	5 March 1998	–	12.33	51°30′50″N 0°0′29″E	Due to Jubilee Line extension construction, DLR platforms did not open with the rest of the Beckton extension. Original station opened 1847.	Canning Town
Canning Town (Low Level)		Newham	2 & 3	31 August 2011	–	12.33	51°30′50″N 0°0′31″E	On site of North London Line platforms (1847–2006)	Canning Town
Crossharbour		Tower Hamlets	2	31 August 1987	East Ferry Road, Glengall Grove, Crossharbour & London Arena	3.70	51°29′44.87″N 0°0′52.17″W	On the site of Millwall Docks railway station (1871–1926)	Cubitt Town
Custom House		Newham	3	28 March 1994	Custom House	5.07	51°30′34.7″N 0°1′33.22″E	Original station opened 1855–2006. Previously Custom House, prior to the opening of ExCeL London.	Custom House
Cutty Sark for Maritime Greenwich		Greenwich	2 & 3	3 December 1999	Cutty Sark, Greenwich Town	7.63	51°28′54.13″N 0°0′39.28″W	–	Greenwich
Cyprus		Newham	3	28 March 1994	–	2.27	51°30′31″N 0°03′50″E	–	Cyprus
Deptford Bridge		Lewisham	2 & 3	20 November 1999	Deptford Creek	3.10	51°28′27.84″N 0°1′21″W	–	Deptford
Devons Road		Tower Hamlets	2	31 August 1987	–	2.41	51°31′20″N 0°01′2.5″W	–	Bow
East India		Tower Hamlets	2 & 3	28 March 1994	Brunswick, Brunswick Wharf	4.41	51°30′33.48″N 0°0′7.56″W	–	Leamouth
Elverson Road		Greenwich	2 & 3	20 November 1999	–	1.47	51°28′7.19″N 0°0′58.93″W	–	St John's
Gallions Reach		Newham	3	28 March 1994	Eastern Gateway	2.03	51°30′32″N 0°04′18″E	–	Beckton
Greenwich		Greenwich	2 & 3	20 November 1999	–	5.33	51°28′41.16″N 0°0′50.4″W	Original station opened 1838	Greenwich
Heron Quays ( from Canary Wharf tube station)		Tower Hamlets	2	31 August 1987	Heron Wharf	5.94	51°30′10.52″N 0°1′17.65″W	Resited in 2002 when new development opened	Heron Quays
Island Gardens		Tower Hamlets	2	31 August 1987	North Greenwich, Cubitt Town	2.36	51°29′16.9″N 0°0′37.8″W	The position planned before the railway originally opened was on the other side of Manchester Road. The station was relocated underground with the opening of the Lewisham extension on 20 November 1999.	Isle of Dogs
King George V		Newham	3	2 December 2005	North Woolwich	1.59	51°30′7.1″N 0°3′46″E	Originally, the route was to terminate at City Airport.	North Woolwich
Langdon Park		Tower Hamlets	2	9 December 2007	Fawe Street, Carmen Street	4.12	51°30′54″N 0°0′50.4″W	Station safeguarded since original railway opened. To the south of South Bromley railway station (1884–1944)	Poplar
Lewisham		Lewisham	2 & 3	20 November 1999	–	7.56	51°27′55.08″N 0°0′47.88″W	Original station opened 1849.	Lewisham
Limehouse		Tower Hamlets	2	31 August 1987	Stepney East	8.54	51°30′44.64″N 0°2′22.92″W	Original station opened 1840	Limehouse
London City Airport		Newham	3	2 December 2005	–	3.48	51°30′13″N 0°2′56″E	Drew Primary School had to be demolished and relocated so land could be used for the construction of the station.	Silvertown
Mudchute		Tower Hamlets	2	31 August 1987	Millwall Park, East Ferry Road	1.76	51°29′27.23″N 0°0′52.95″W	Station relocated on 20 November 1999 due to the Lewisham extension opening.	Millwall
Pontoon Dock		Newham	3	2 December 2005	–	2.83	51°30′8″N 0°1′55″E	–	Silvertown
Poplar ( from Canary Wharf railway station)		Tower Hamlets	2	31 August 1987	–	1.81	51°30′27.77″N 0°1′1.99″W	–	Poplar
Prince Regent		Newham	3	28 March 1994	Prince Regent Lane	1.69	51°30′34.01″N 0°2′0.36″E	–	Canning Town
Pudding Mill Lane		Newham	2 & 3	15 January 1996	Marshgate Lane	2.31	51°32′2.76″N 0°0′49.68″W	Station safeguarded since original railway opening. The station was resited and rebuilt on a new alignment on 28 April 2014 as the old site was required for a Crossrail tunnel portal.	Stratford
Royal Albert		Newham	3	28 March 1994	Strait Road	1.49	51°30′31″N 0°02′47″E	–	Beckton
Royal Victoria ( from IFS Cloud Royal Docks)		Newham	3	28 March 1994	Western Gateway	2.91	51°30′33.04″N 0°1′4.84″E	East of the site of Tidal Basin railway station (1858–1943)	Canning Town
Shadwell		Tower Hamlets	2	31 August 1987	–	6.36	51°30′42.16″N 0°3′22.17″W	On the site of Shadwell and St George's East railway station (1840–1941)	Shadwell
South Quay		Tower Hamlets	2	31 August 1987	Cuba Street	4.55	51°30′0.31″N 0°0′58.44″W	Between 12 February and 15 April 1996 there was no service south of Canary Wharf due to a bombing near South Quay. The station was resited to make platform extensions easier as the previous site had tight curves at either end. It was resited on 26 October 2009.	Millwall
Star Lane		Newham	2 & 3	31 August 2011	Cody Road	1.69	51°31′14.52″N 0°0′15.12″E	–	Canning Town
Stratford (High Level)		Newham	2 & 3	31 August 1987	–	54.38	51°32′27″N 0°0′15″W	Original station opened 1839 Resited in 2007.	Stratford
Stratford (Low Level)		Newham	2 & 3	31 August 2011	–	54.38	51°32′27″N 0°0′11″W	On site of North London Line platforms (1846–2006)	Stratford
Stratford High Street		Newham	2 & 3	31 August 2011	Stratford Market	1.29	51°32′16.44″N 0°0′2.16″W	On site of Stratford Market station (1847–1957)	Stratford
Stratford International		Newham	2 & 3	31 August 2011	–	4.44	51°32′41.28″N 0°0′30.96″W	National Rail station opened 2009	Stratford
Tower Gateway ( from Fenchurch Street railway station and from Tower Hill tube station)		City of London	1	31 August 1987	Tower Hill, Minories	3.14	51°30′38.2″N 0°4′29.18″W	Options before the railway opened included a separate terminus for Tower Hill and a tunnelled terminus at Aldgate East	Minories
West Ham		Newham	2 & 3	31 August 2011	–	5.34	51°31′40.8″N 0°0′14.4″E	Original station opened 1901	West Ham
West India Quay ( from Canary Wharf railway station)		Tower Hamlets	2	31 August 1987	West India Dock, North Quay	3.09	51°30′24.9″N 0°1′13.78″W	–	Canary Wharf
West Silvertown		Newham	3	2 December 2005	–	2.44	51°30′10″N 0°1′21″E	–	Silvertown
Westferry		Tower Hamlets	2	31 August 1987	West Ferry Road	3.38	51°30′33.74″N 0°1′36.11″W	–	Limehouse
Woolwich Arsenal ( from Woolwich railway station)		Greenwich	4	10 January 2009	–	6.98	51°29′24″N 0°4′8.4″E	Original station opened 1849.	Woolwich

== Planned stations ==
There are currently two planned projects that will add stations to the DLR network - a new station at Thames Wharf and an extension to Thamesmead.

Station	Local Authority	Other names (Note: Names listed here are those that were proposed before opening and any renamings.)	Notes
Thames Wharf	Newham	Thameside West	Safeguarded as part of the London City Airport extension, the site is currently being used for Silvertown Tunnel construction. Following completion of the tunnel in 2025, 5,000 new homes and a DLR station will be built.
Beckton Riverside	Newham	Armada Riverside	A planned extension of the DLR to Thamesmead, first formally proposed in 2020. As of January 2021, feasibility and technical work is underway. Beckton Riverside was previously proposed as part of the cancelled Dagenham Dock extension.
Thamesmead	Greenwich	Thamesmead Central	A planned extension of the DLR to Thamesmead, first formally proposed in 2020. As of January 2021, feasibility and technical work is underway. Beckton Riverside was previously proposed as part of the cancelled Dagenham Dock extension.

== Safeguarded stations ==
As part of the development of the Docklands Light Railway, several sites were safeguarded for future station construction, some of which have been implemented.

Previously safeguarded

Two stations were safeguarded as part of the initial construction of the railway in the 1980s.

- Pudding Mill Lane, located alongside the Great Eastern Main Line between Stratford and Bow Church. The station opened in 1996.
- Langdon Park, located between All Saints and Devons Road. Planned as "Carmen Street", the station opened in 2007.

No longer proposed

- Thames Wharf, located south of Canning Town, was safeguarded during the construction of the Beckton extension. Given construction of flying junctions for access to the Stratford International and Woolwich Arsenal branches of the DLR, construction of this station is no longer possible. A new safeguarded site for a Thames Wharf station was constructed as part of the London City Airport extension.
- Connaught, located on a straight section of viaduct between Prince Regent and Royal Albert stations, was safeguarded during the construction of the Beckton extension in the 1990s. The site was close to the long closed Connaught Road station. Although a straight section of viaduct remains, the station is not currently proposed, despite recent development in the local area such as ExCeL London and London Regatta Centre.

Currently proposed

- Thames Wharf was safeguarded as part of the London City Airport extension, with a straight section of viaduct. The site is currently being used for Silvertown Tunnel construction. Following completion of the tunnel in 2025, 5,000 new homes and a DLR station will be built.

== See also ==
- List of London railway stations
- List of London Underground stations
- List of former and unopened London Underground stations
- Category:Railway stations in London by borough
