= Thames Wharf DLR station =

Planned Docklands Light Railway station in London

Thames Wharf
- Interactive map of Thames Wharf

General information
- Location: Silvertown
- Local authority: London Borough of Newham
- Managed by: Docklands Light Railway
- Number of platforms: 2
- Accessible: Yes
- Fare zone: 3

DLR annual boardings and alightings
- 2021: No data
- 2022: No data
- 2023: No data
- 2024: No data
- 2025: No data

Other information
- Coordinates: 51.5073°N 0.0122°E

Thames Wharf is a planned Docklands Light Railway station located in Silvertown in East London. The station name was also previously proposed for another station in the area.

== Beckton branch station ==
In 1994, the proposed location was between Canning Town and Royal Victoria, adjacent to the Limmo Peninsula. Due to the construction of flying junctions for access to the Stratford International and Woolwich Arsenal branches of the DLR, construction of this station is no longer possible.

== Woolwich Arsenal branch station ==
As part of the construction of the London City Airport extension in the mid 2000s, a gap in the viaduct due west of the western end of Royal Victoria Dock, between Canning Town and West Silvertown stations - was passively safeguarded for a future station. Development is restricted by safeguarding for a future river crossing, and the area is surrounded by brownfield and industrial sites.

In the 2010s, a new Thames river crossing was announced - the Silvertown Tunnel. Following the completion of the tunnel in April 2025, around 5,000 homes will be built on the site, supported by the construction of the new DLR station. As part of the 2018 budget the Chancellor approved the required funding for the DLR to support this and other development in the Royal Docks. However, a re-evaluation of financing meant that the project was put on hold in June 2021, with the original 2018 funding expired by March 2023. Following Regal Arada (now Arada London) moving to control the majority of the Thameside West development, Transport for London has decided to begin work with Arup on a new station design - development in the area expected to start from 2028, subject to planning approval.

=== Services ===
Future Development
Preceding station	DLR	Following station
Canning Town towards Bank or Tower Gateway	Docklands Light Railway	West Silvertown towards Woolwich Arsenal
