= Gallions Reach DLR station =

Docklands Light Railway station

Gallions Reach
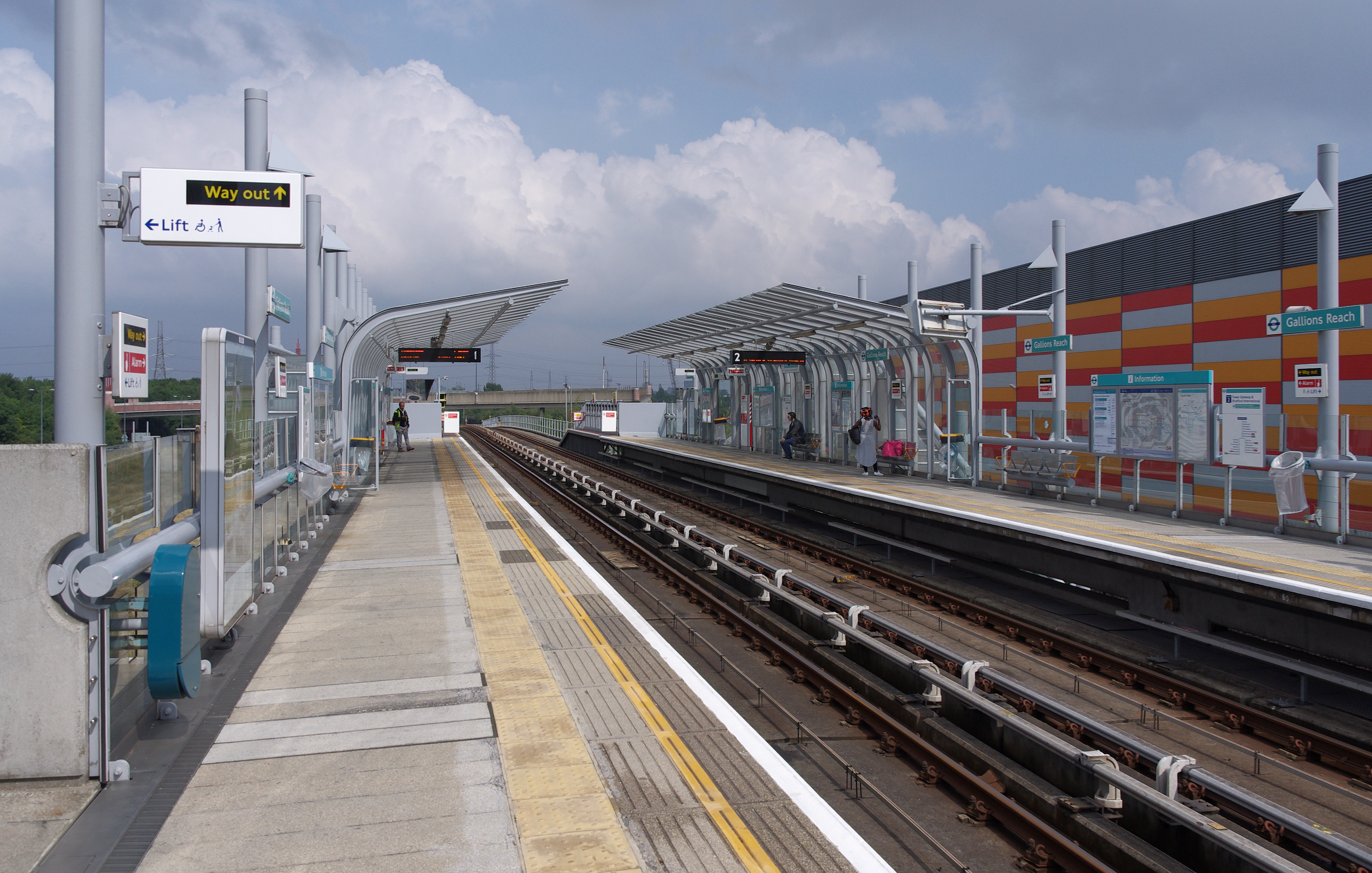
- Platforms in 2013

General information
- Location: North Woolwich, Newham
- Coordinates: 51.5089°N 0.0719°E
- Owned by: Transport for London
- Managed by: Docklands Light Railway
- Platforms: 2

Construction
- Structure type: At-grade
- Accessible: Yes

Other information
- Status: Unstaffed
- Fare zone: 3
- Website: Official website

History
- Opened: 28 March 1994

Passengers

DLR annual entry and exit
- 2020: ▼0.871 million
- 2021: ▲1.096 million
- 2022: ▲1.690 million
- 2023: ▲2.030 million
- 2024: ▼1.90 million
Location
- Location in Newham

Gallions Reach DLR station is a station on the Docklands Light Railway (DLR) in the North Woolwich area of east London. It serves the recent residential developments around Royal Albert Dock. The station is located on the DLR's Beckton branch, between Cyprus and Beckton stations. It is in London fare zone 3.

The crossover junction north of the station, which is normally used for trains from the west going to Beckton DLR depot, can also be used for trains from Beckton and Poplar to reverse. This is the easternmost station on the DLR, as Beckton is actually to the west of Gallions Reach.

Similar to other stations on the Beckton branch, the platforms have not been extended to accommodate 3-car trains, with selective door operation being used instead.

== History ==
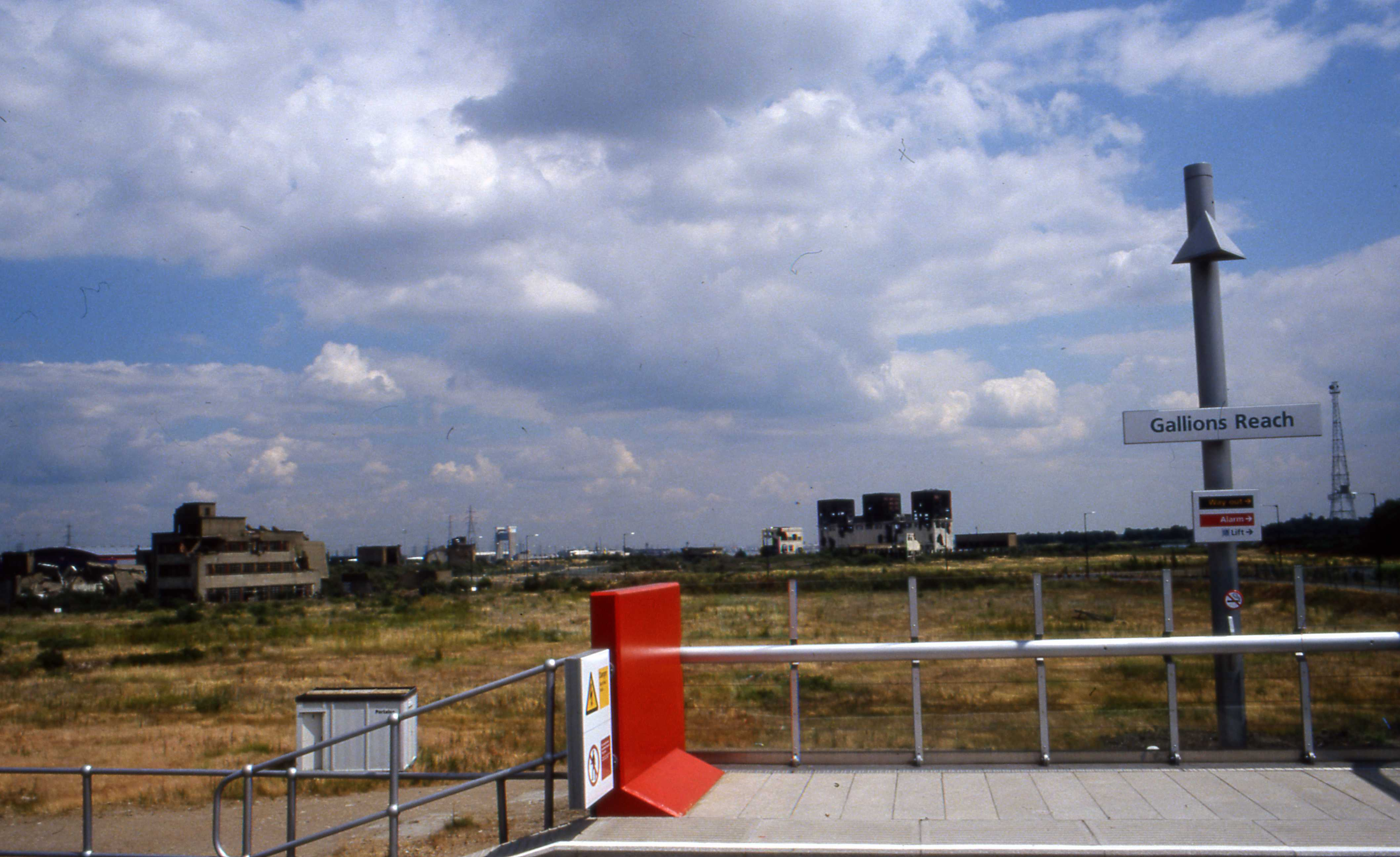
Ruins of Beckton Gas Works from Gallions Reach, 1994

When the station opened with the Beckton extension in 1994, it was surrounded by brownfield land such as the old Beckton Gas Works, which closed in 1970. Given this, ridership was very low, despite suburban residential development in nearby Beckton. It was named after a section of the river.

Ridership grew following the opening of the UEL Docklands Campus and Gallions Reach Shopping Park in the early 2000s and residential development around Royal Albert Dock in the 2010s. By 2019, ridership had increased to 1.42m a year.

In the mid-2000s, there were proposals for a DLR extension to Dagenham Dock, which would have branched off east of the station. This was cancelled in 2008. A route of East London Transit was also proposed to pass through the area.

The local area has also been proposed for various road crossings of the River Thames – the East London River Crossing and Gallions Reach Crossing.

== Services ==
The typical off-peak service in trains per hour from Gallions Reach is:

- 12 tph to Canning Town of which 6 continue to Tower Gateway
- 12 tph to Beckton

Additional services call at the station during the peak hours, increasing the service to up to 16 tph in each direction.

== Connections ==
London Buses routes 129, 262, 366 and night route N551 serve the station.

== Future ==
In the mid-2010s, an extension of the DLR to Thamesmead was proposed. As of December 2020, the proposed route of the extension diverges just after Gallions Reach, turning east to pass by Beckton DLR depot before heading to Thamesmead via Beckton Riverside. Media reports in November 2025 anticipate that the extension will be backed by the UK Treasury in the November budget.

Preceding station	DLR	Following station
Cyprus towards Tower Gateway	Docklands Light Railway	Beckton Terminus
	Possible services	
Cyprus towards Bank or Tower Gateway	Docklands Light Railway	Beckton Riverside towards Thamesmead

== See also ==
- Gallions railway station
- Manor Way railway station
