= Royal Albert DLR station =

Docklands Light Railway station

Royal Albert
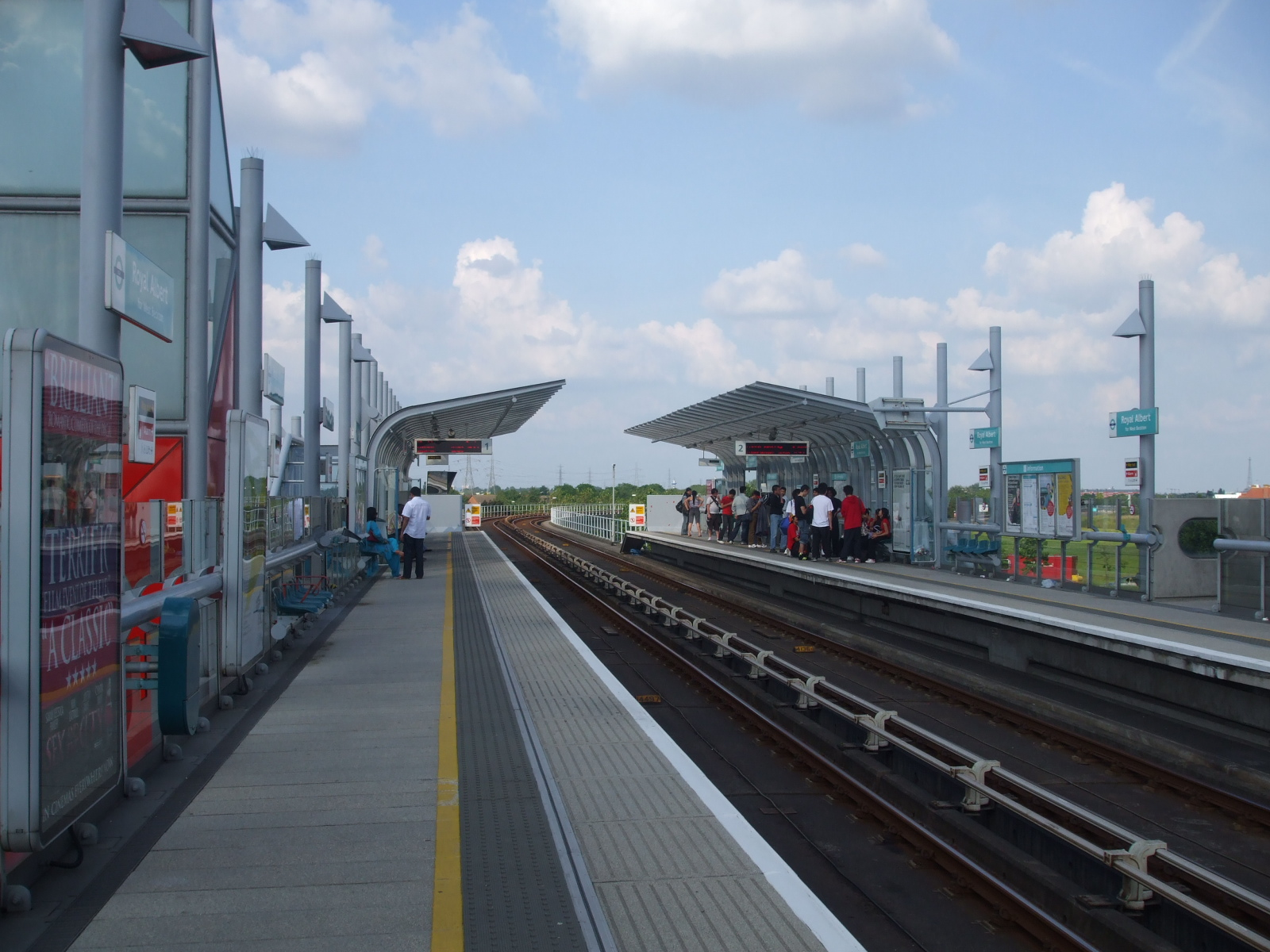
- The platforms in 2008

General information
- Location: Beckton, Newham
- Coordinates: 51.5083°N 0.0459°E
- Owned by: Transport for London
- Managed by: Docklands Light Railway
- Platforms: 2

Construction
- Structure type: Elevated
- Accessible: Yes

Other information
- Status: Unstaffed
- Fare zone: 3
- Website: Official website

History
- Opened: 28 March 1994

Passengers

DLR annual entry and exit
- 2021: ▲0.798 million
- 2022: ▲1.340 million
- 2023: ▲1.490 million
- 2024: ▼1.42 million
- 2025: ▼1.23 million
Location
- Location in Newham

Royal Albert DLR station is a station on the Docklands Light Railway (DLR) in Beckton in east London. The station serves the western end of the north quay of the Royal Albert Dock, from which it takes its name. A view of the London City Airport is available.

The station is located on an elevated section of the DLR's Beckton branch, between Prince Regent and Beckton Park stations. It is in London fare zone 3.

== History ==
The station was opened on 28 March 1994. There was previously a station called Connaught Road on the Eastern Counties and Thames Junction Railway in the same area but this closed in 1940.

It was originally planned that in 2010 work would start on extending the platforms at Royal Albert to handle three-car trains, which are being introduced across the DLR. The extension would have been at the east end of the station, bringing the platforms closer to Royal Docks Road, although no new access steps were planned. The platforms have not however been extended, and although metal catwalks have been installed, these are too narrow for non-emergency use and Selective Door Operation is used instead.

2010 should have also seen Royal Albert served by a second DLR service. The existing route between Beckton and Tower Gateway would have been supplemented by a second service between Beckton and Stratford International via Canning Town using the new DLR tracks from Canning Town to Stratford International. However this extension was severely delayed and didn't open until 31 August 2011.

== Services ==
The typical off-peak service in trains per hour from Royal Albert is:

- 12 tph to Canning Town of which 6 continue to Tower Gateway
- 12 tph to Beckton

Additional services call at the station during the peak hours, increasing the service to up to 16 tph in each direction.

Preceding station	DLR	Following station
Prince Regent towards Tower Gateway	Docklands Light Railway	Beckton Park towards Beckton

== Design ==
During disruption, Royal Albert acts as a terminus with a shuttle between Royal Albert and Beckton. This is possible because there is a crossover to the west of the station.

== Location ==
The station is further from the nearest houses than any other on the DLR, despite which it has a steady patronage from those living in the area of Beckton to the north. In fact the station signage is subtitled "For West Beckton". However, the access route from these houses to the station, crossing the busy Royal Albert Way on the level, is notably substandard, the only footbridge being some distance away.

Following the relocation of many London Borough of Newham council staff to the Building 1000 offices adjoining the station, usage has increased substantially during office hours.

The station serves the London Regatta Centre and Royal Docks Business Park which houses Newham Council.

London Buses routes 129 and 376 serves the station.
