= Cyprus DLR station =

Railway station in London

Cyprus
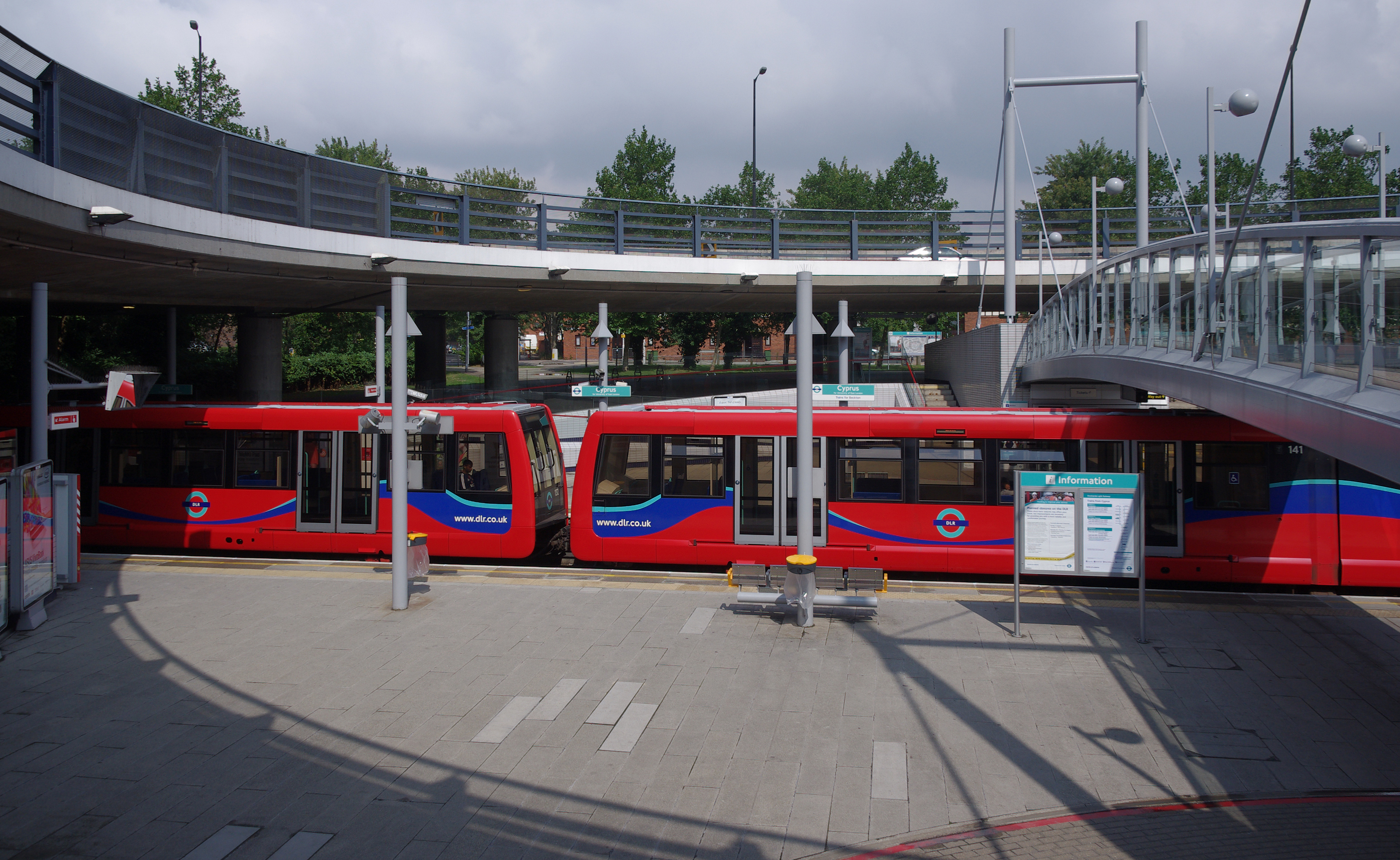
- Eastbound platform in 2013

General information
- Location: Cyprus, Newham
- Coordinates: 51.5084°N 0.0641°E
- Owner: Transport for London
- Manager: Docklands Light Railway
- Platforms: 2

Construction
- Structure type: At-grade
- Accessible: Yes

Other information
- Status: Unstaffed
- Fare zone: 3
- Website: Official website

History
- Opened: 28 March 1994

Passengers

DLR annual entry and exit
- 2021: ▲1.139 million
- 2022: ▲2.020 million
- 2023: ▲2.270 million
- 2024: ▼2.0 million
- 2025: ▼1.95 million
Location
- Location in Newham

Cyprus is a station on the Docklands Light Railway (DLR) located in Cyprus, to the south of Beckton area of Newham, east London. The area is named after the Mediterranean island of Cyprus. The station serves the University of East London Docklands Campus and the eastern end of the north quay of the Royal Albert Dock.

The station is located on the DLR's Beckton branch, between Beckton Park and Gallions Reach stations. It is in London fare zone 3. It is served by DLR services from Tower Gateway to Beckton.

== Design ==
Along with Beckton Park, Cyprus station is of an unusual design. Between the two stations, the DLR runs in the central reservation of a major road built at the same time as the railway. The stations are located at highway intersections which take the form of roundabouts. On the approach to the roundabout, the road rises slightly whilst the railway dips slightly; the station is therefore situated in a cutting, under the centre of the elevated roundabout, with pedestrian access at surface level under the elevated roadways and arched over the railway. (See the image at Beckton Park DLR station)

== Services ==
The typical off-peak service in trains per hour from Cyprus is:

- 12 tph to Canning Town of which 6 continue to Tower Gateway
- 12 tph to Beckton

Additional services call at the station during the peak hours, increasing the service to up to 16 tph in each direction.

== Connections ==
London Buses routes 366, 376, 474 and 678 serve the station.

Preceding station	DLR	Following station
Beckton Park towards Tower Gateway	Docklands Light Railway	Gallions Reach towards Beckton
