= Beckton (disambiguation) =

Beckton is an urban neighbourhood in east London.

Beckton may also refer to:

== Places ==
- Beckton, Kentucky, US

=== Railway stations ===
- Beckton DLR station, on the Docklands Light Railway
- Beckton Park DLR station, on the Docklands Light Railway
- Beckton railway station, a former railway station

== Other uses ==
- Norm Beckton (1898–1984), Australian Rules footballer
- Beckton (microprocessor), a microprocessor

== See also ==
- Beckton Gas Works, in Beckton, London, formerly with spoil heaps known as "Beckton Alps"
