= Beckton Park DLR station =

Docklands Light Railway station

Beckton Park
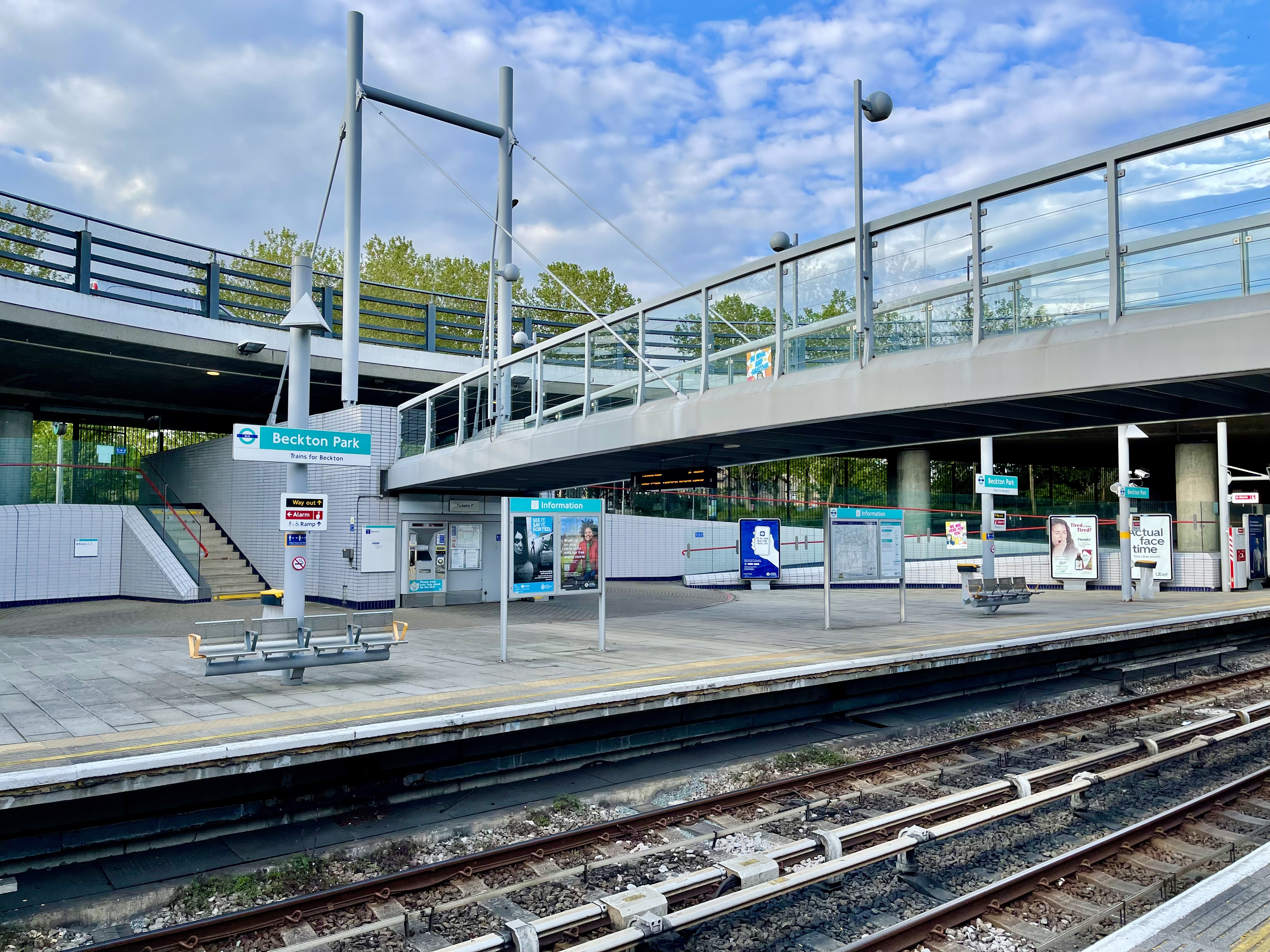
- Eastbound platform, footbridge and roundabout above the station in 2021

General information
- Location: Beckton, Newham
- Coordinates: 51.5086°N 0.0550°E
- Owner: Transport for London
- Manager: Docklands Light Railway
- Platforms: 2

Construction
- Structure type: At-grade
- Accessible: Yes

Other information
- Status: Unstaffed
- Fare zone: 3
- Website: Official website

History
- Opened: 28 March 1994

Passengers

DLR annual entry and exit
- 2021: ▲0.288 million
- 2022: ▲0.490 million
- 2023: ▲0.520 million
- 2024: ▼0.49 million
- 2025: ▼0.43 million
Location
- Location in Newham

Beckton Park DLR station is a station on the Docklands Light Railway (DLR) in the Beckton area of the London Borough of Newham. The station is located by the north quay of the Royal Albert Dock. The station is opposite Beckton District South Park, which is open space leading to housing in South Beckton.

The station is located on the DLR's Beckton branch, between Royal Albert and Cyprus stations. It is in London fare zone 3 and is the most lightly used station on the DLR. A previous railway station called Central was located largely on the same site from 1880 to 1940, on the former line from Custom House to Gallions.

== Layout ==
The station is unstaffed, like most DLR stations. There is one ticket machine on each platform. There are three Oystercard readers – one on each platform between the ticket machines and a set of stairs, and a more recently added third reader at the approach to the station's connecting footbridge (thus, due to the position, this newer Oyster reader's pad is protected from rain).

Along with neighbouring Cyprus station, Beckton Park station is of an unusual design. Between the two stations, the DLR runs in the median of a major highway built at the same time as the railway. The stations are located at highway intersections which take the form of roundabouts. On the approach to the roundabout, the road rises slightly whilst the railway dips slightly; the station is therefore situated in a cutting, under the centre of the elevated roundabout, with pedestrian access at surface level under the elevated roadways and arched over the railway.

== Services ==
The typical off-peak service in trains per hour from Beckton Park is:

- 12 tph to Canning Town of which 6 continue to Tower Gateway
- 12 tph to Beckton

Additional services call at the station during the peak hours, increasing the service to up to 16 tph in each direction.

Preceding station	DLR	Following station
Royal Albert towards Tower Gateway	Docklands Light Railway	Cyprus towards Beckton

== Connections ==
London Buses route 376 and school route 678 serve the station.
