= Prince Regent DLR station =

Docklands Light Railway station

Prince Regent
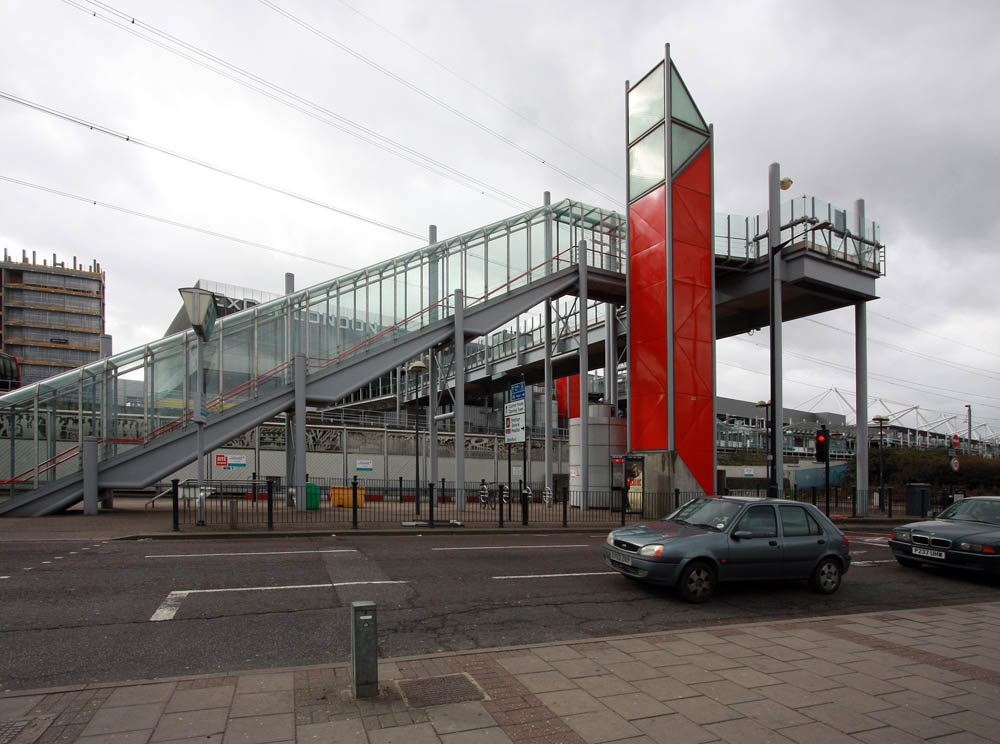
- The station in 2011

General information
- Location: Custom House, Newham
- Coordinates: 51.5093°N 0.0337°E
- Owned by: Transport for London
- Managed by: Docklands Light Railway
- Platforms: 2

Construction
- Structure type: Elevated
- Accessible: Yes

Other information
- Status: Unstaffed
- Fare zone: 3
- Website: Edit this at Wikidata

History
- Opened: 28 March 1994

Passengers

DLR annual entry and exit
- 2020: ▼0.953 million
- 2021: ▲1.381 million
- 2022: ▲1.540 million
- 2023: ▲1.690 million
- 2024: ▼1.35 million
Location
- Location in Newham

Prince Regent DLR station is a station on the Docklands Light Railway (DLR) in Custom House, Newham in east London. The station was opened on 28 March 1994 and provides access to the eastern end of the ExCeL Exhibition Centre and ICC London. The station signage is subtitled 'for ExCeL East'.

The station is named after Prince Regent Lane, which runs north from the station towards the A13 road. The lane was built in 1811 and named after the then Prince Regent (later King George IV); it served a ferry that ran between Plaistow Level (the present Silvertown) and Charlton.

There is a small bus station adjoining the station with buses to Plaistow and London City Airport.

The station is located on the DLR's Beckton branch, between Custom House and Royal Albert stations. It is in London fare zone 3. During major exhibitions at the adjacent Excel Centre an additional DLR shuttle service operates between Canning Town and Prince Regent stations, to supplement the normal Tower Gateway to Beckton service. The trains shuttle reverse on a crossover well to the east of the station, within sight of the next station at Royal Albert.

== Services ==
The typical off-peak service in trains per hour from Prince Regent is:

- 12 tph to Canning Town of which 6 continue to Tower Gateway
- 12 tph to Beckton

Additional services call at the station during the peak hours, increasing the service to up to 16 tph in each direction.

Preceding station	DLR	Following station
Custom House towards Tower Gateway	Docklands Light Railway	Royal Albert towards Beckton

== Connections ==
The London buses that serve Prince Regent DLR station is 241, 474, 300, 304, 325, 473, 678 (school journeys only) and N551 (night journeys only).
