= Cyprus, London =

Coordinates: 51.508983°N 0.064223°E

Cyprus
- Location within Greater London
- London borough: Newham
- Ceremonial county: Greater London
- Region: London
- Country: England
- Sovereign state: United Kingdom
- Post town: LONDON
- Postcode district: E6
- Dialling code: 020
- Police: Metropolitan
- Fire: London
- Ambulance: London
- London Assembly: City and East

Cyprus is an area of Beckton in the Docklands area of the London Borough of Newham. It is located west of Beckton proper and north of the eastern end of the Royal Albert Dock.

== History ==
It is named after the Cyprus Estate, a housing estate built for workers at the Royal Albert Dock, which opened in 1881. The estate was named to commemorate the United Kingdom's acquisition of the island of Cyprus in 1878. It was built on one of the few pieces of land not owned by the Port of London Authority, and hence was open to such development.

In 1981 during the redevelopment of the London Docklands, Cyprus was the location of the first new private housing development in the Docklands for many years, and the first sponsored by the London Docklands Development Corporation. It was considered a success in generating a balanced community and prompted further housing developments throughout the docklands.

== Area today ==
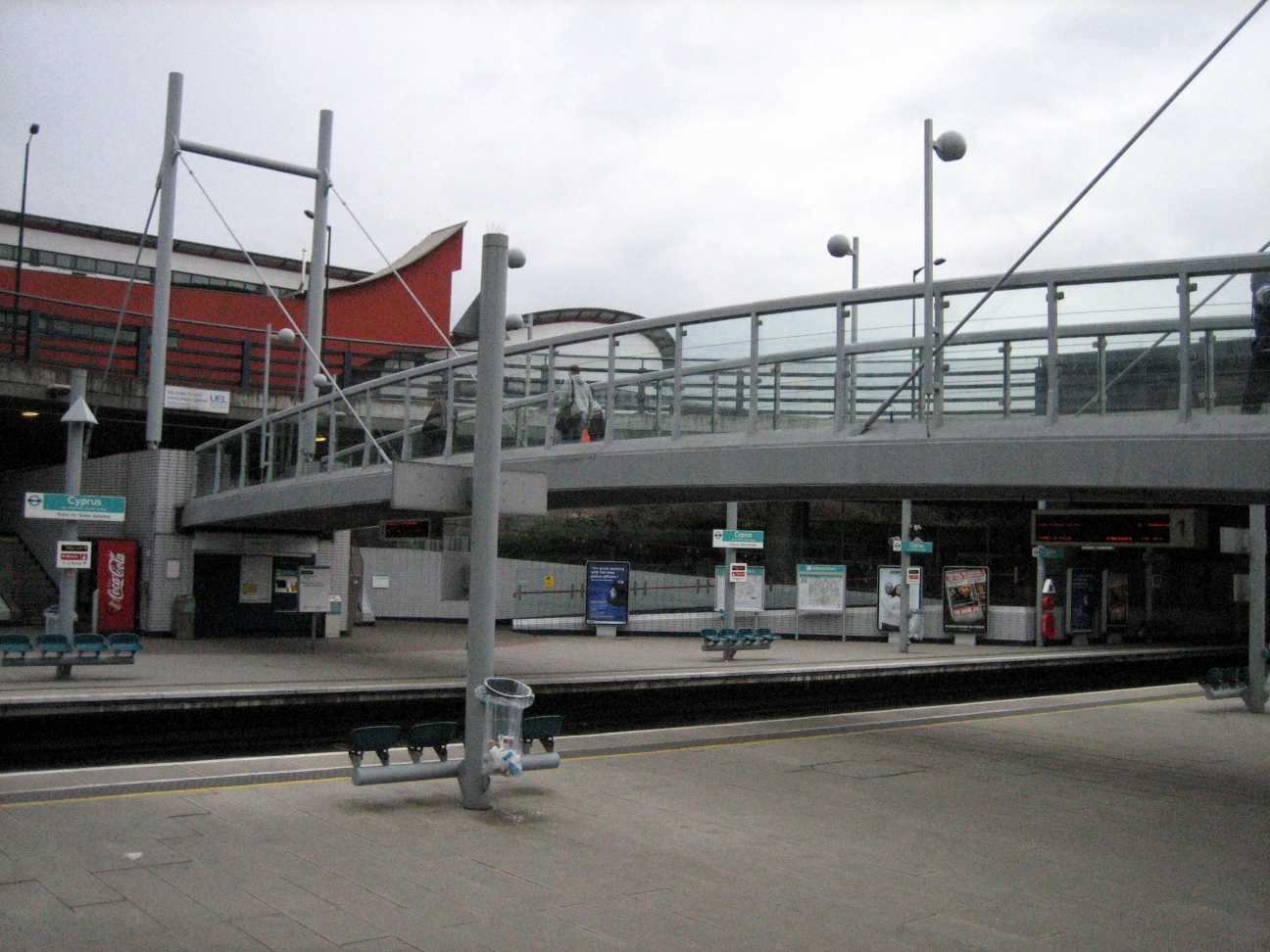
The area is served by a DLR station

The area remains mainly a residential one, with few local commercial services, aside from the presence of the University of East London whose Docklands campus was opened in 1999 and is located on the quayside. There is also a community centre, the Royal Docks Medical Centre and a beach.

=== Transport ===
The nearest Docklands Light Railway station is Cyprus. The station is directly outside the university campus.
