= East India Station =

East India Station may refer to:

- East Indies Station, a former British Royal Navy station
- East India DLR station, a station on the Docklands Light Railway, London, England
