= West Silvertown DLR station =

Docklands Light Railway station

West Silvertown
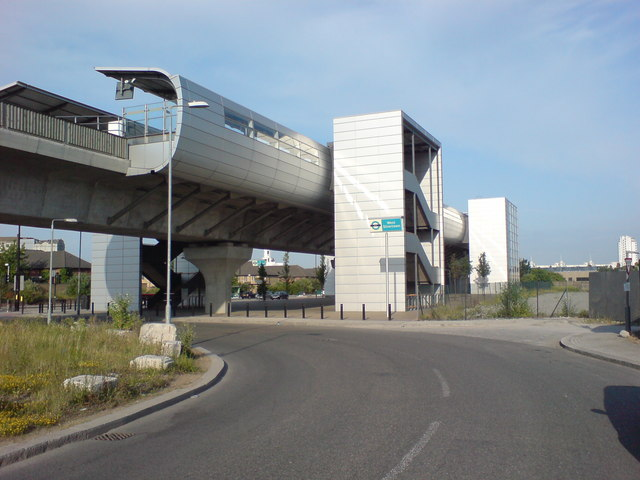
- Station viewed from the north in 2009

General information
- Location: Silvertown, Newham
- Coordinates: 51.502778°N 0.0225°E
- Owned by: Transport for London
- Managed by: Docklands Light Railway
- Platforms: 2

Construction
- Structure type: Elevated
- Accessible: Yes

Other information
- Status: Unstaffed
- Fare zone: 3
- Website: Official website

History
- Opened: 2 December 2005

Passengers

DLR annual entry and exit
- 2021: ▲1.506 million
- 2022: ▲2.230 million
- 2023: ▲2.440 million
- 2024: ▼2.22 million
- 2025: ▼2.16 million
Location
- Location in Newham

West Silvertown is a Docklands Light Railway (DLR) station in Silvertown, which opened in December 2005. It is located on the Woolwich Arsenal branch. Trains run Westbound to the Bank in the City of London and Eastbound to Woolwich Arsenal, passing through London City Airport station.

The station is in the London Borough of Newham and is located in London fare zone 3.

== History ==
Prior to December 2005, Docklands Light Railway trains would arrive at Canning Town and continue in a south-easterly direction towards Royal Victoria. In December 2005, the new King George V branch was opened from Canning Town.

== Design ==
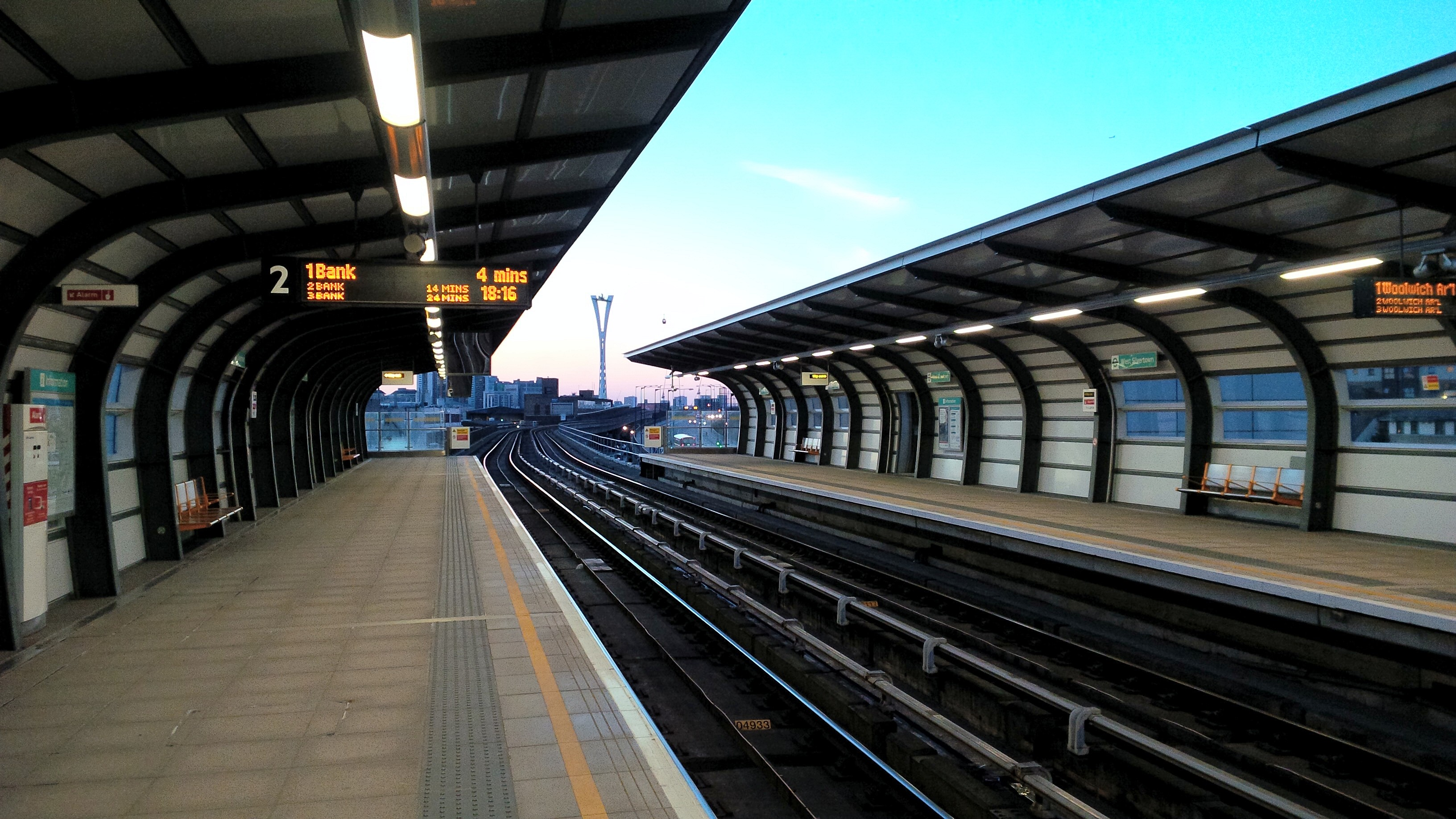
Interior of the West Silvertown station

The station (like most Docklands Light Railway stations) is elevated and can be reached from street level by stairs or a lift.

== Location ==
The station is close to Lyle Park and was set up to serve Britannia Village and the proposed new development at Peruvian Wharf.

== Connections ==
London Buses routes 129 and 330 serve the station.

== Services ==
The typical off-peak service in trains per hour from West Silvertown is:

- 6 tph to Stratford International
- 6 tph to Bank
- 12 tph to Woolwich Arsenal

Additional services call at the station during the peak hours, increasing the service to up to 16 tph in each direction, with up to 8 tph to Bank and Stratford International.

Preceding station	DLR	Following station
Canning Town towards Bank or Stratford International	Docklands Light Railway	Pontoon Dock towards Woolwich Arsenal
	Future Development	
Thames Wharf towards Bank or Stratford International	Docklands Light Railway	Pontoon Dock towards Woolwich Arsenal

== Future ==
A future Thames Wharf station between this station and Canning Town is safeguarded and considered after the Thames Wharf development is given the go-ahead and the Silvertown Tunnel is completed.
