= East India DLR station =

Docklands Light Railway station

East India
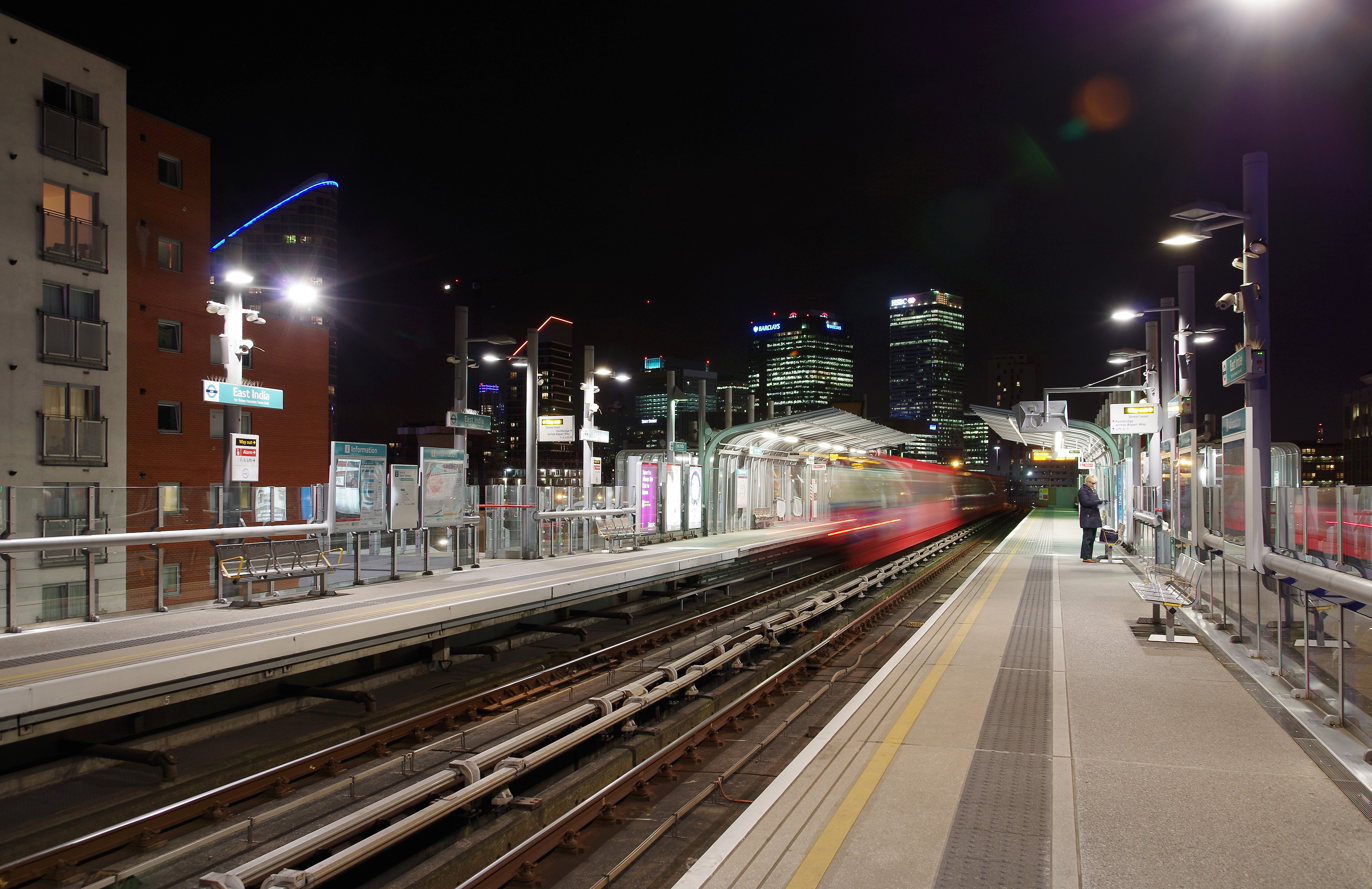
- Looking west at the station in 2014

General information
- Location: Blackwall, Tower Hamlets
- Coordinates: 51.5093°N 0.0021°W
- Owned by: Transport for London
- Managed by: Docklands Light Railway
- Platforms: 2

Construction
- Structure type: Elevated
- Accessible: Yes

Other information
- Status: Unstaffed
- Fare zone: 2 and 3
- Website: Edit this at Wikidata

History
- Opened: 28 March 1994

Passengers

DLR annual entry and exit
- 2020: ▼1.703 million
- 2021: ▲2.333 million
- 2022: ▲3.980 million
- 2023: ▲4.410 million
- 2024: ▼4.07 million
Location
- Location in Tower Hamlets

East India is a station on Docklands Light Railway (DLR) in Blackwall, east London. It takes its name from the nearby former East India Docks of the Port of London, where ships trading with the Indian subcontinent used to dock.

It is on the Beckton and Woolwich Arsenal branches of the DLR, and is in London fare zone 2 and 3. It opened, with the Beckton Branch, on 28 March 1994.

The historic Greenwich Prime Meridian crosses the DLR at the eastern end of the platforms, which is marked by an illuminated blue line underneath the tracks at street level. The modern IERS Reference Meridian used by GPS crosses the tracks approximately 117 metres further east between Neutron Tower and Switch House, but is unmarked.

== History ==
East India station was originally to be named Brunswick Wharf and this name was shown on the 1994 'all projections' map. 'Brunswick' is now a code destination used to indicate that a train in the depot has been cleaned. In February 2001 an episode of the ITV series The Bill featured DLR trains with 'Brunswick' as a dummy destination for filming purposes.

== Services ==
The typical off-peak service in trains per hour from East India is:

- 6 tph to Tower Gateway
- 6 tph to Bank
- 6 tph to Beckton
- 6 tph to Woolwich Arsenal

Additional services call at the station during the peak hours, increasing the service to up to 16 tph in each direction.

Preceding station	DLR	Following station
Blackwall towards Bank or Tower Gateway	Docklands Light Railway	Canning Town towards Beckton or Woolwich Arsenal

== Connections ==
London Buses routes D3, SL4 and night route N550 serve the station.
