= Royal Victoria DLR station =

Docklands Light Railway station

Royal Victoria
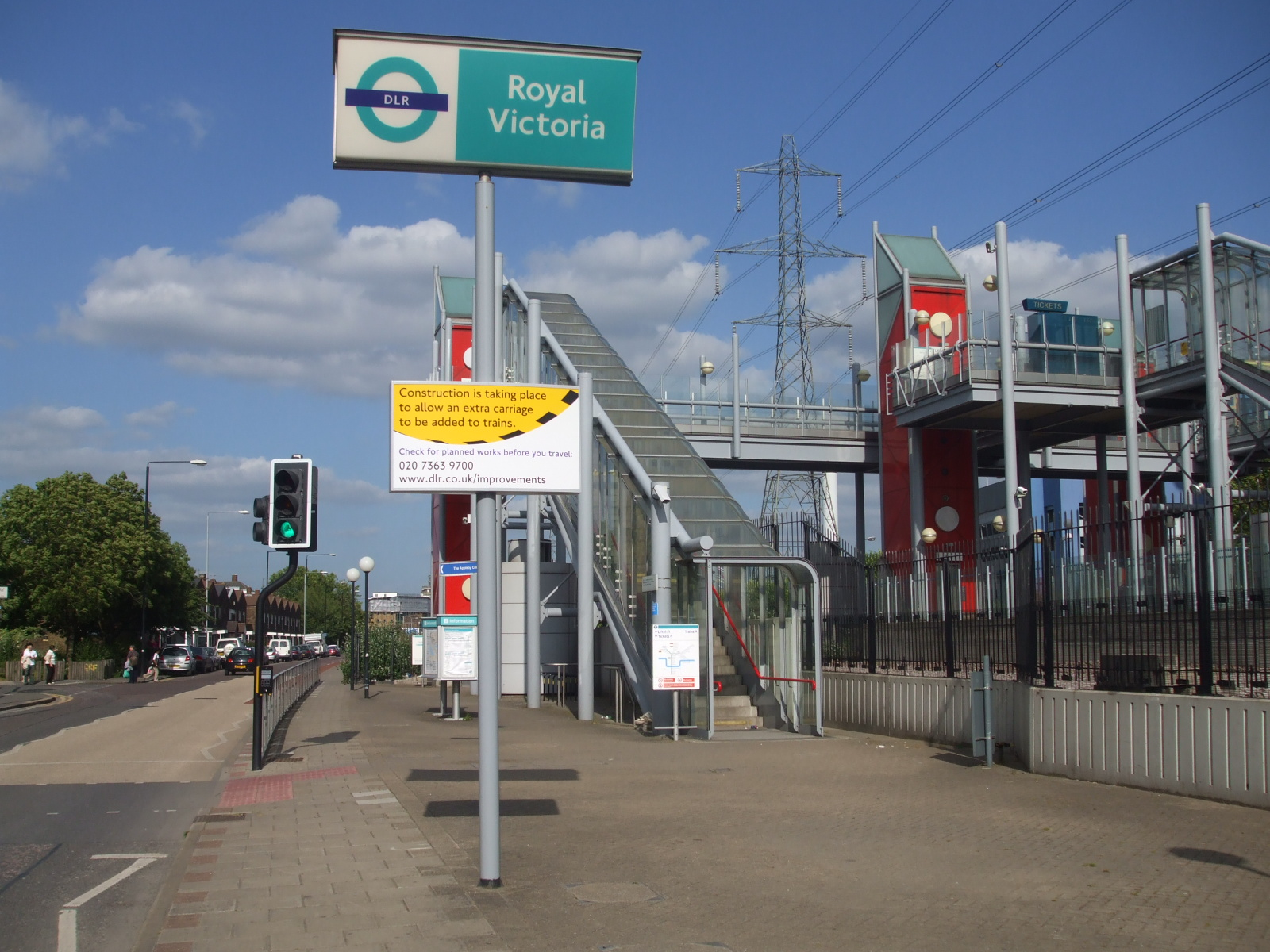
- Station entrance in 2008

General information
- Location: Royal Victoria Dock, Newham
- Coordinates: 51.5092°N 0.0187°E
- Owned by: Transport for London
- Managed by: Docklands Light Railway
- Platforms: 2

Construction
- Structure type: At-grade
- Accessible: Yes

Other information
- Status: Unstaffed
- Fare zone: 3
- Website: Edit this at Wikidata

History
- Opened: 28 March 1994

Passengers

DLR annual entry and exit
- 2020: ▼2.220 million
- 2021: ▲2.287 million
- 2022: ▲2.630 million
- 2023: ▲2.910 million
- 2024: ▼2.53 million
Location
- Location in Newham

Royal Victoria DLR station is on the Docklands Light Railway (DLR) in Canning Town, east London. The station opened in 1994 and is named after the nearby Royal Victoria Dock. It is on the DLR's Beckton branch, in London fare zone 3, and is the nearest station for the northern terminus of the IFS Cloud Cable Car and for London's new City Hall.

== History ==
The station is located on a stretch of line first opened in 1855, when the Eastern Counties Railway (ECR) was forced to divert its line to North Woolwich (the former Eastern Counties and Thames Junction Railway) around the newly opened Royal Victoria Dock. This line went on to become part of National Rail's North London line, although there was never a station at the site until the coming of the Docklands Light Railway.

When the Docklands Light Railway extension to Beckton was constructed in the 1990s, its tracks, between Canning Town and Custom House stations, were constructed on the same right of way but to the west and south side of the existing tracks. Royal Victoria station opened on the Docklands Light Railway tracks on 28 March 1994, while North London Line trains continued to pass without stopping on their tracks until that section of the line closed on 9 December 2006.

During 2009, as part of the Canning Town DLR flyover and the new DLR line from Canning Town to Stratford, an engineers' siding was added to the Victoria Dock Road side of the station.

On 1 June 2009 the Beckton branch was diverted onto the new flyover, which crossed the Woolwich branch and the branch to Stratford International. The flyover was constructed as part of the 3-Car Capacity Enhancement Project to serve Canning Town high-level DLR station. (See main article Docklands Light Railway extension to Stratford International.) It is 330 metres long, and is formed from a number of different structures connected by a continuous reinforced concrete deck cast in situ. In addition, it allows DLR services from Canning Town towards Woolwich and Beckton to depart from any eastbound DLR platform.

== Services ==
The typical off-peak service in trains per hour from Royal Victoria is:

- 12 tph to Canning Town of which 6 continue to Tower Gateway
- 12 tph to Beckton

Additional services call at the station during the peak hours, increasing the service to up to 16 tph in each direction.

Preceding station	DLR	Following station
Canning Town towards Tower Gateway	Docklands Light Railway	Custom House towards Beckton

== Connections ==
London Buses routes 147, 474, the Silvertown Tunnel cycle shuttle and night route N551 serve the station.
