= Limmo Peninsula =

Coordinates: 51.5109032°N 0.0082751°E

- Location within Greater London
- OS grid reference: TQ394810
  - Charing Cross: 5.65 mi (9.1 km) W
- London borough: Newham
- Ceremonial county: Greater London
- Region: London
- Country: England
- Sovereign state: United Kingdom
- Post town: LONDON
- Postcode district: E16
- Dialling code: 020
- Police: Metropolitan
- Fire: London
- Ambulance: London
- UK Parliament: West Ham and Beckton
- London Assembly: City and East

The Limmo Peninsula is an area of Canning Town in the London Borough of Newham in East London. It lies on the east bank of Bow Creek at the mouth of the River Lea near Leamouth.

== Etymology ==
Created in the 1990s, the nearby Bow Creek Ecology Park was formerly known as the Limmo Peninsula Ecological Park.

== History ==
The site was used as construction staging for the Jubilee Line Extension in the 1990s and the Docklands Light Railway extension to City Airport in the 2000s, before being used as the primary work site for the eastbound tunnel boring machines for Crossrail in the 2010s. Archaeologists working on the Crossrail site in 2012 uncovered remains of the Thames Ironworks and Shipbuilding Company.

In 2018, Sadiq Khan announced that, following the completion of Crossrail works in 2018, the 12-acre site would be developed for housing – with over 1,500 new homes. The site is currently owned by Transport for London, with income from the project reinvested into the transport system.

== Geography ==
It is located to the west of Canning Town. The River Lea forms an 'S' shape bend with the Leamouth Peninsula surrounded by Newham on three sides and connected to Tower Hamlets to the south.

== See also ==
- List of tunnels in the United Kingdom
