= List of stations in London fare zone 3 =

Zone of London's zonal fare system

Fare zone 3 is an outer zone of Transport for London's zonal fare system used for calculating the price of tickets for travel on the London Underground, London Overground, Docklands Light Railway (DLR) and, since 2007, on National Rail services. It was created on 22 May 1983 as Outer zone 3a, one of five zones introduced for the Travelcard. The zone took its current name on 8 January 1989. It extends from approximately 4 miles (6.4 km) to 7.75 miles (12.47 km) from Piccadilly Circus.

== List of stations ==
The following stations are in zone 3:

Station	Local authority	Managed by	Notes
Abbey Road	Newham	DLR	Also in zone 2
Acton Central	Ealing	London Overground	
Acton Main Line	Ealing	Elizabeth line	
Acton Town	Ealing	London Underground	
Alexandra Palace	Haringey	Great Northern	
Archway	Islington	London Underground	Also in zone 2
Balham LU	Wandsworth	London Underground	
Balham NR	Wandsworth	Southern	
Barnes	Richmond upon Thames	South Western Railway	
Barnes Bridge	Richmond upon Thames	South Western Railway	
Beckton	Newham	DLR	
Beckton Park	Newham	DLR	
Bellingham	Lewisham	Southeastern	
Blackheath	Lewisham	Southeastern	
Blackhorse Road	Waltham Forest	London Underground	
Bounds Green	Haringey	London Underground	Also in zone 4
Bowes Park	Haringey	Great Northern	Also in zone 4
Brent Cross	Barnet	London Underground	
Brent Cross West	Barnet	Thameslink	
Bromley-by-Bow	Tower Hamlets	London Underground	Also in zone 2
Bruce Grove	Haringey	London Overground	
Canning Town	Newham	London Underground	Also in zone 2
Catford	Lewisham	Southeastern	
Catford Bridge	Lewisham	Southeastern	
Charlton	Greenwich	Southeastern	
Chiswick	Hounslow	South Western Railway	
Chiswick Park	Ealing	London Underground	
Clapham South	Wandsworth	London Underground	Also in zone 2
Clapton	Hackney	London Overground	Also in zone 2
Colliers Wood	Merton	London Underground	
Cricklewood	Barnet	Thameslink	
Crofton Park	Lewisham	Southeastern	
Crouch Hill	Haringey	London Overground	
Crystal Palace	Bromley	London Overground	Also in zone 4
Custom House	Newham	DLR	
Cutty Sark	Greenwich	DLR	Also in zone 2
Cyprus	Newham	DLR	
Deptford Bridge	Greenwich	DLR	Also in zone 2
Dollis Hill	Brent	London Underground	
Ealing Broadway	Ealing	Elizabeth line	
Ealing Common	Ealing	London Underground	
Earlsfield	Wandsworth	South Western Railway	
East Finchley	Barnet	London Underground	
East Ham	Newham	London Underground	Also in zone 4
East India	Tower Hamlets	DLR	Also in zone 2
East Putney	Wandsworth	London Underground	Also in zone 2
Elverson Road	Lewisham	DLR	Also in zone 2
Forest Gate	Newham	Elizabeth line	
Forest Hill	Lewisham	London Overground	
Gallions Reach	Newham	DLR	
Gipsy Hill	Lambeth	Southern	
Golders Green	Barnet	London Underground	
Greenwich	Greenwich	Southeastern	Also in zone 2
Gunnersbury	Hounslow	London Underground	
Hampstead	Camden	London Underground	Also in zone 2
Hanger Lane	Ealing	London Underground	
Harlesden	Brent	London Underground	
Harringay	Haringey	Great Northern	
Harringay Green Lanes	Haringey	London Overground	
Haydons Road	Merton	Thameslink	
Hendon	Barnet	Thameslink	Also in zone 4
Hendon Central	Barnet	London Underground	Also in zone 4
Herne Hill	Lambeth	Southeastern	Also in zone 2
Highgate	Haringey	London Underground	
Hither Green	Lewisham	Southeastern	
Honor Oak Park	Lewisham	London Overground	
Hornsey	Haringey	Great Northern	
Kew Gardens	Richmond-upon-Thames	London Underground	Also in zone 4
Kidbrooke	Greenwich	Southeastern	
King George V	Newham	DLR	
Ladywell	Lewisham	Southeastern	
Lee	Lewisham	Southeastern	
Lewisham	Lewisham	Southeastern	Also in zone 2
Leyton	Waltham Forest	London Underground	
Leyton Midland Road	Waltham Forest	London Overground	
Leytonstone	Waltham Forest	London Underground	Also in zone 4
Leytonstone High Road	Waltham Forest	London Overground	
London City Airport	Newham	DLR	
Manor House	Hackney / Haringey	London Underground	Also in zone 2
Manor Park	Newham	Elizabeth line	Also in zone 4
Maryland	Newham	Elizabeth line	
Maze Hill	Greenwich	Southeastern	
Mitcham Eastfields	Merton	Southern	
Mortlake	Richmond-upon-Thames	South Western Railway	
Neasden	Brent	London Underground	
Norbury	Croydon	Southern	
North Acton	Ealing	London Underground	Also in zone 2
North Dulwich	Southwark	Southern	Also in zone 2
North Ealing	Ealing	London Underground	
North Greenwich	Greenwich	London Underground	Also in zone 2
North Sheen	Richmond-upon-Thames	South Western Railway	
Northfields	Ealing	London Underground	
Northumberland Park	Haringey	Greater Anglia	
Park Royal	Ealing	London Underground	
Plaistow	Newham	London Underground	
Pontoon Dock	Newham	DLR	
Prince Regent	Newham	DLR	
Pudding Mill Lane	Newham	DLR	Also in zone 2
Putney	Wandsworth	South Western Railway	Also in zone 2
Royal Albert	Newham	DLR	
Royal Victoria	Newham	DLR	
Seven Sisters	Haringey	London Underground	
South Acton	Ealing	London Overground	
South Ealing	Ealing	London Underground	
South Tottenham	Haringey	London Overground	
South Wimbledon	Merton	London Underground	Also in zone 4
Southfields	Wandsworth	London Underground	
St James Street	Waltham Forest	London Overground	
Stamford Hill	Hackney	London Overground	
Star Lane	Newham	DLR	Also in zone 2
Stonebridge Park	Brent	London Underground	
Stratford	Newham	London Underground	Also in zone 2
Stratford High Street	Newham	DLR	Also in zone 2
Stratford International DLR	Newham	DLR	Also in zone 3
Stratford International HS1	Newham	Southeastern	Also in zone 3. (Note: Transport for London Oyster card and contactless pay-as-you-go is only available between St Pancras and Stratford International. Other zone-based ticketing is not available.)
Streatham	Lambeth	Southern	
Streatham Common	Lambeth	Southern	
Streatham Hill	Lambeth	Southern	
Sydenham	Lewisham	London Overground	
Sydenham Hill	Southwark	Southeastern	
Tooting	Merton	Thameslink	
Tooting Bec	Wandsworth	London Underground	
Tooting Broadway	Wandsworth	London Underground	
Tottenham Hale	Haringey	London Underground	
Tulse Hill	Lambeth	Southern	
Turnham Green	Hounslow	London Underground	Also in zone 2
Turnpike Lane	Haringey	London Underground	
Upton Park	Newham	London Underground	
Walthamstow Central LU	Waltham Forest	London Underground	
Walthamstow Central NR	Waltham Forest	London Overground	
Walthamstow Queen's Road	Waltham Forest	London Overground	
Wanstead Park	Newham	London Overground	
Wandsworth Common	Wandsworth	Southern	
West Acton	Ealing	London Underground	
West Dulwich	Southwark	Southeastern	
West Ealing	Ealing	Elizabeth line	
West Ham	Newham	London Underground	Also in zone 2
West Norwood	Lambeth	Southern	
West Silvertown	Newham	DLR	
Westcombe Park	Greenwich	Southeastern	
White Hart Lane	Haringey	London Overground	
Willesden Green	Brent	London Underground	Also in zone 2
Willesden Junction	Brent	London Overground	Also in zone 2
Wimbledon	Merton	South Western Railway	
Wimbledon Chase	Merton	Thameslink	
Wimbledon Park	Merton	London Underground	
Wood Green	Haringey	London Underground	
Woodgrange Park	Newham	London Overground	Also in zone 4
Woolwich Dockyard	Greenwich	Southeastern	

== Changes ==
- January 1999: East India and Pudding Mill Lane (DLR) from Zone 3 to Zone 2/3 boundary
- January 2000: Beckton, Cyprus, Gallions Reach and Beckton Park (DLR) from Zone 4 to Zone 3
- January 2008: Hampstead Heath from Zone 3 to Zone 2, Willesden Junction from Zone 3 to Zone 2/3 boundary and Acton Central from Zone 2 to Zone 3
- January 2016: Stratford, Stratford High Street, Stratford International DLR station, West Ham, Canning Town, Star Lane and Abbey Road from Zone 3 to Zone 2/3 boundary.
- December 2023: Addition of Brent Cross West
