= University of East London Docklands Campus =

Campus of the University of East London

Coordinates: 51.5076°N 0.0655°E

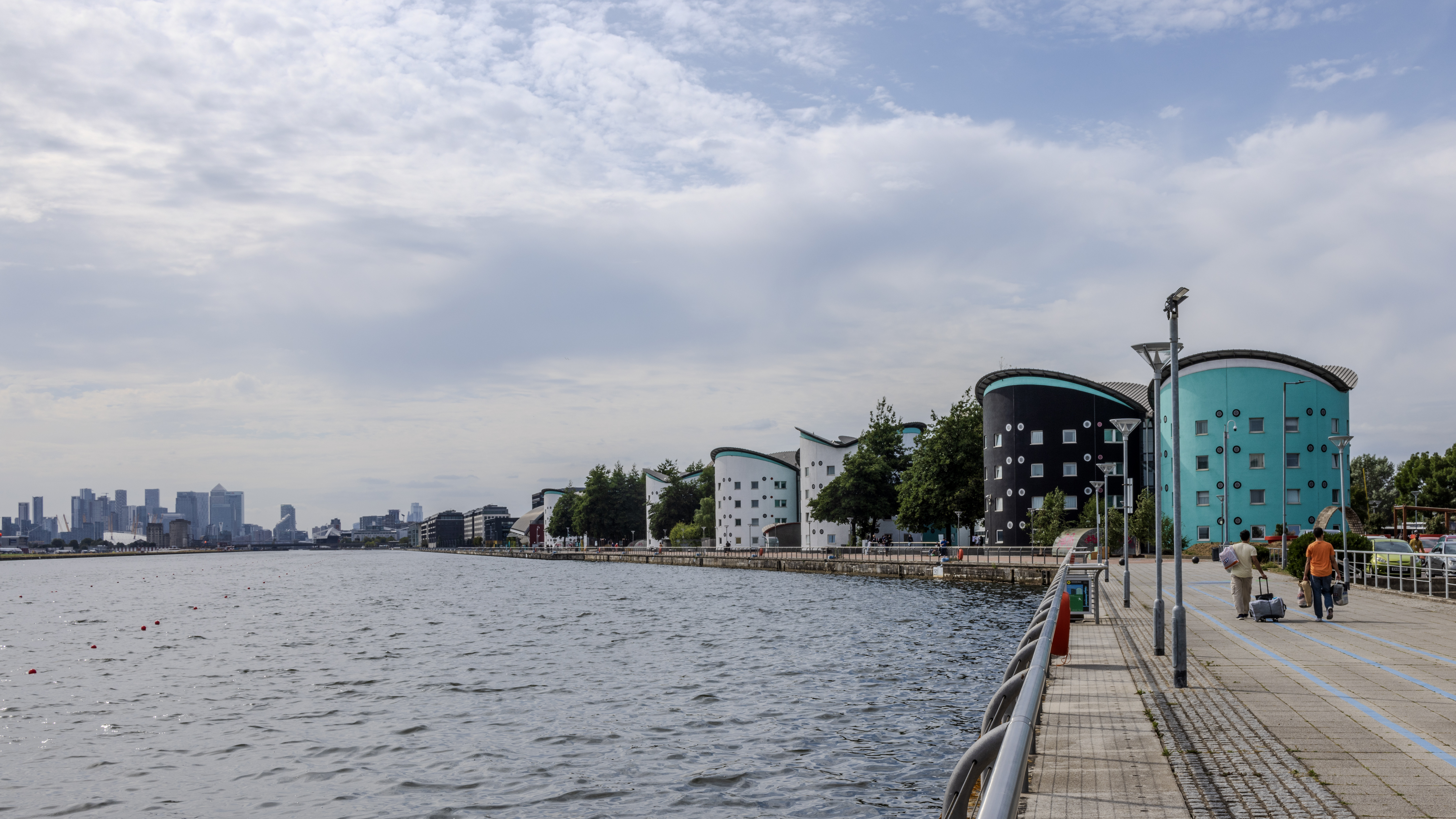
UEL Docklands Campus

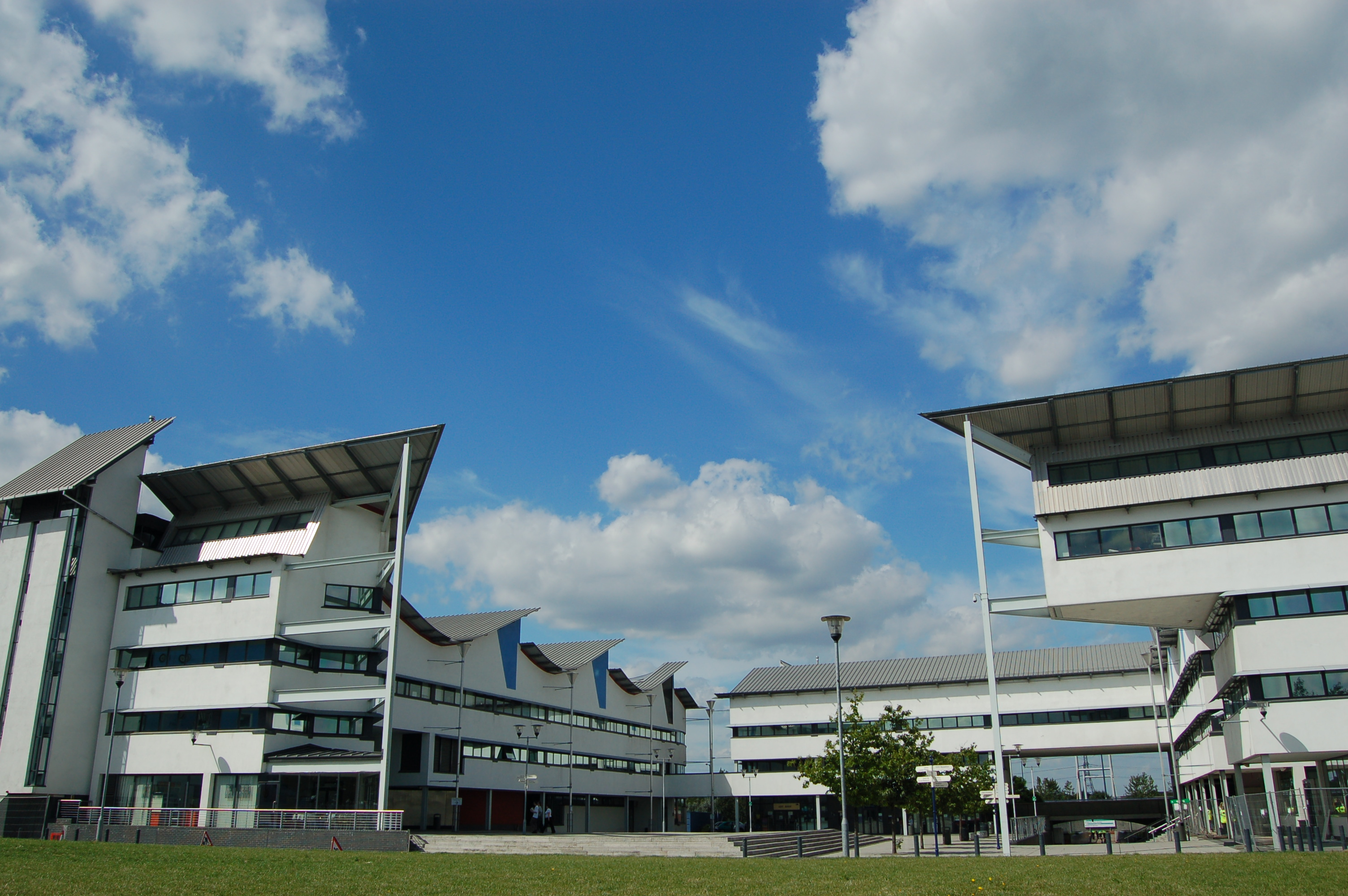
The Square

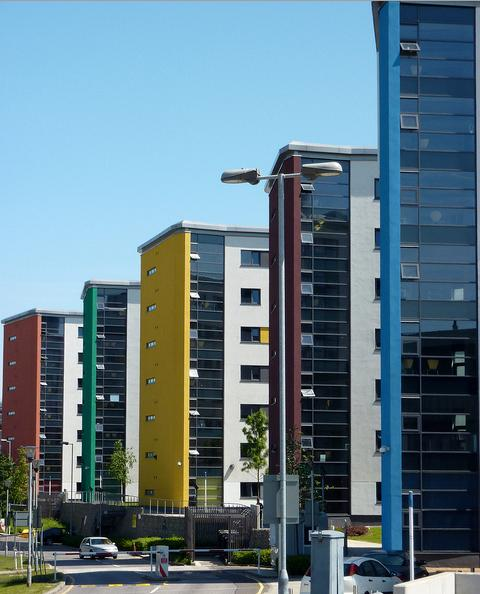
Halls of Residence

The University of East London Docklands Campus is a campus of the University of East London (UEL) situated in the Beckton area of east London. The campus opened in 1999. It is one of two campuses in UEL, the other being the Stratford Campus.

The campus is adjacent to the Royal Albert Dock, closed to commercial shipping since the 1980s and now largely used as a water sports centre and rowing course, see London Regatta Centre. The Cyprus station of the Docklands Light Railway is directly connected to the pedestrian spine of the campus, and offers links to central London.

London City Airport is directly opposite the campus, on the other side of the Royal Albert Dock. The distinctive rounded halls of residence buildings can be seen from across the dock.

Docklands was London's first new university campus to be built in over half a century. The Business School will incorporate the Petchey Centre for Entrepreneurship, named in honour of its benefactor, entrepreneur Jack Petchey.

In March 2025, the university announced it had entered into a partnership with Siemens to provide a water-source heat pump, extracting heat from the water in the Royal Albert Docks to provide a lower-carbon source of heating for the Docklands Campus library and Royal Docks Centre for Sustainability buildings.
