= Royal Albert Dock, London =

Docks in East London, England

Coordinates: 51.5066°N 0.0542°E

Royal Albert Dock
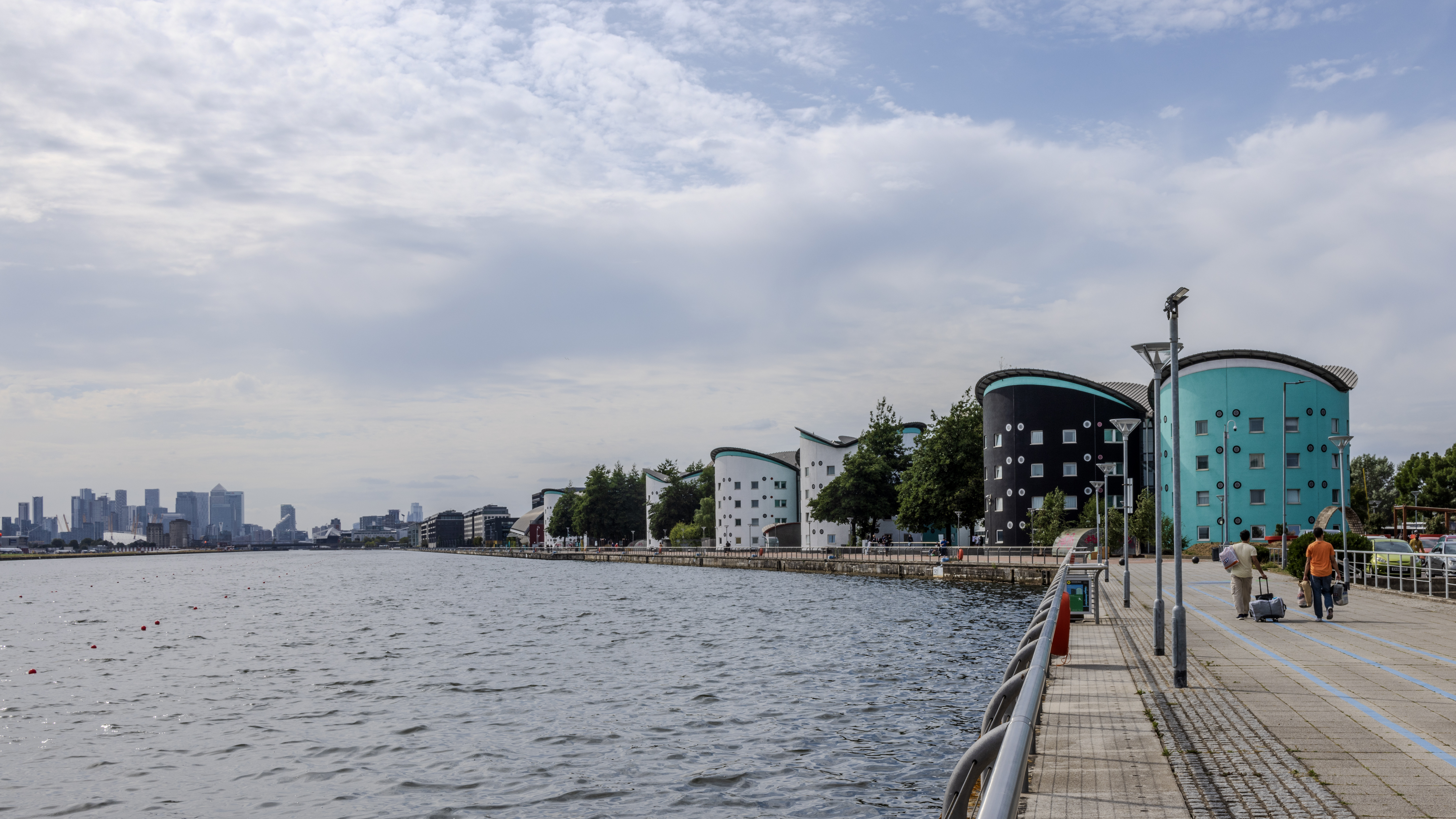
- University of East London Docklands Campus, on the Royal Albert Dock

- Location within London Borough of Newham
- Location: London

History
- Built: 1880; 146 years ago

Site notes
- Architect: Sir Alexander Rendel

The Royal Albert Dock is one of three docks in the Royal Group of Docks of East London.

== History ==
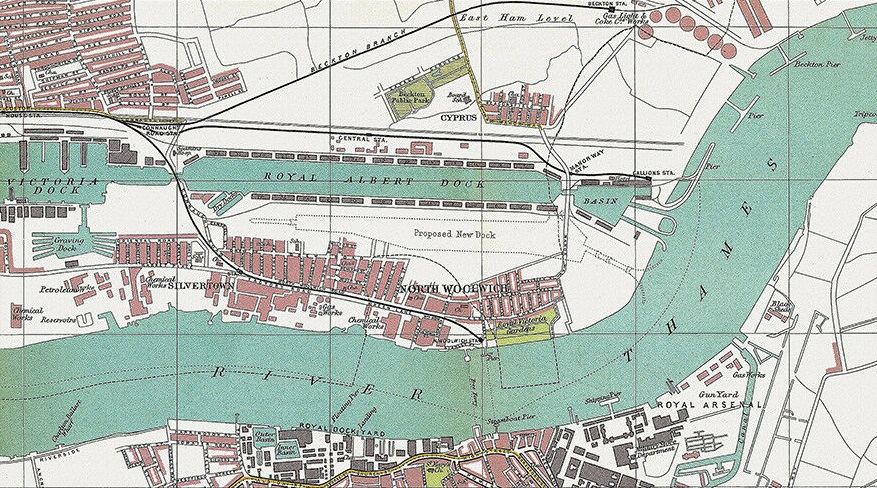
Map showing the Royal Albert Dock, 1908

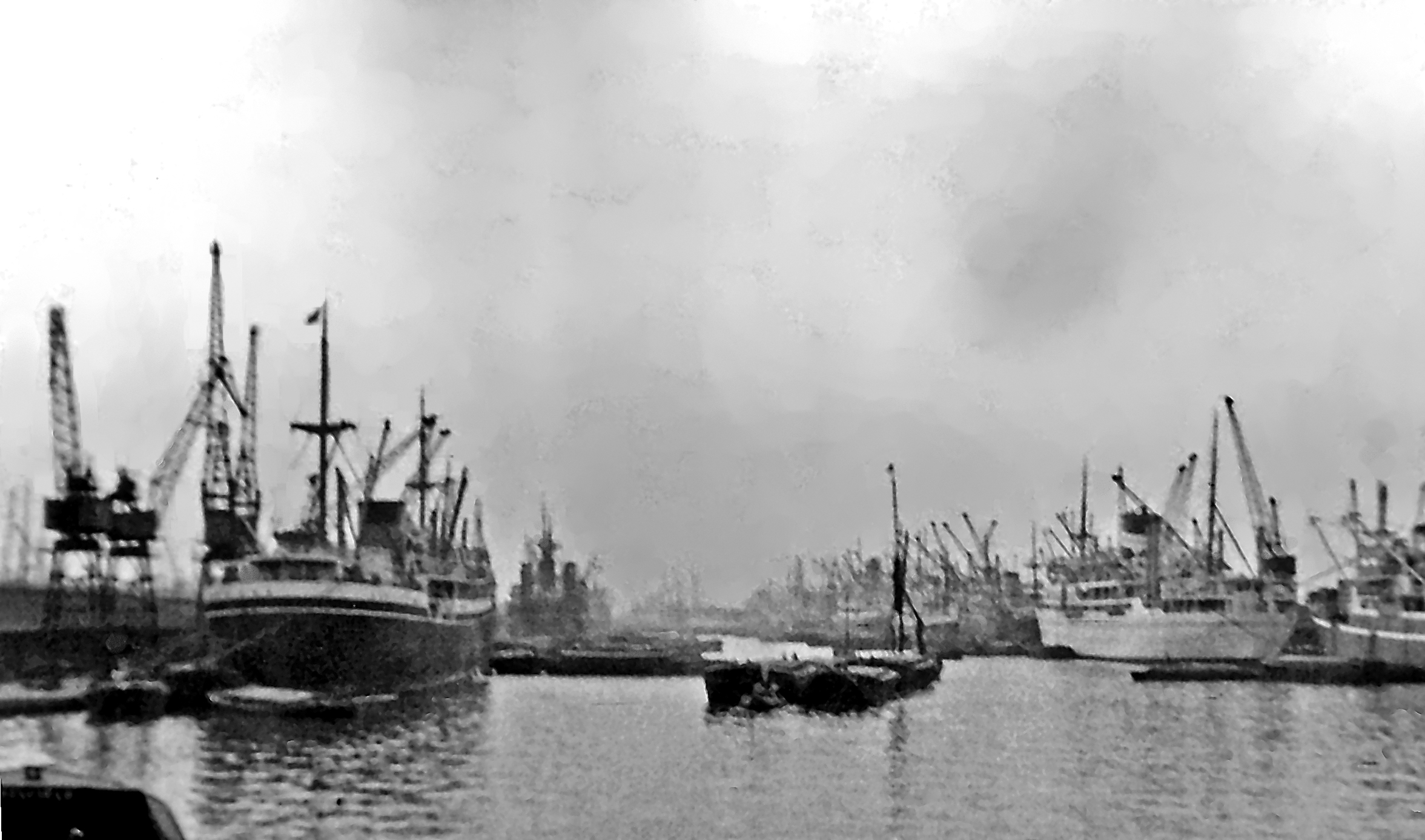
The dock in 1955

=== 19th century – establishment ===
The dock, which was designed by Sir Alexander Rendel as an extension to the Victoria Dock. It was authorised by the London and Saint Katharine Docks Company Act 1875 (38 & 39 Vict. c. cliii), constructed by Lucas and Aird, and completed in 1880. Two dry docks and machine shops were established to the south at the western end for ship repairs by R & H Green & Silley Weir (later River Thames Shiprepairs Ltd).

=== Late 20th century – decline and limited redevelopment ===
From the 1960s onwards, the Royal Albert Dock experienced a steady decline – as did all of London's other docks – as the shipping industry adopted containerisation, which effectively moved traffic downstream to Tilbury. It finally closed to commercial traffic along with the other Royal Docks in 1981.

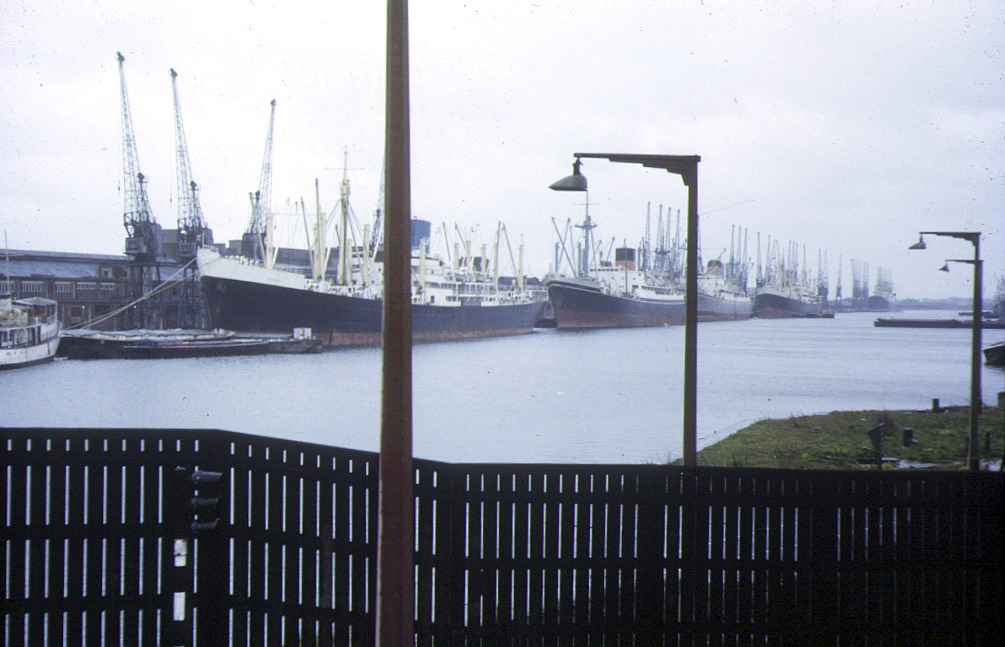
The dock viewed from the west in 1973.

Redevelopment in the late 20th century included the construction of London City Airport which was built on the south bank of the dock with a single runway and completed in 1987. At the eastern end of the north bank the University of East London Docklands Campus opened in 1999. Redevelopment also included the London Regatta Centre which was built at the western end of the north bank and opened in 2000. In the early 20th century 'Building 1000' was built on the north bank of the dock at a cost of £70 million and was completed in 2004.

=== Early 21st century ===
==== Failed redevelopment (2013–2023) ====
In May 2013, the Mayor of London, Boris Johnson, announced a development of the Royal Albert Dock, reported to be worth £6 billion to the capital's economy and creating over 20,000 jobs. The developer was to be Shanghai-based ABP (Advanced Business Park), with CITIC Construction assigned as main contractor, and Multiplex assigned as principal sub-contractor. Johnson promised that the development would be the "next Canary Wharf", serving as a gateway for Asian and Chinese businesses, creating 20,000 jobs and adding £6 billion to the UK economy. Johnson named the main road serving the development "Mandarin Street" to attract Chinese businesses.

Construction officially began in June 2017. Phase 1 of the project was completed in the first quarter of 2018, consisting of 21 buildings with 460,000 sq ft of office space and 140,000 sq ft of retail and public realm. Phase 2 was designed to begin late 2020, consisting of further office and retail spaces, along with residential units and membership clubs.

In February 2022, the business park was described as a half finished, abandoned and mostly empty "ghost town" and white elephant with less than 10% of units ever being occupied. It has become a favoured filming location "because there are never any people around".

The Financial Times suggested in early 2022 that, "the Albert Dock development owned by Beijing-based Advanced Business Park, is on the brink of collapse after creditors appointed administrators to recover unpaid debts".

==== Renewed redevelopment (2024–present) ====
In July 2022, PwC was appointed as liquidator to 23 companies within the ABP Group and the development was subsequently sold to property firm DPK led by amateur jockey David Maxwell. In February 2024, it was reported that two of the blocks would be converted into student accommodation, with the remaining blocks being repurposed for office, research, healthcare and educational uses. Thirty acres of derelict land adjacent to the scheme remains in GLA ownership. In July 2026, Firma Partners provided a £113m loan to DPK Group to fund the conversion of 20 former ABP buildings (450,000 sq ft) into a purpose-built student accommodation (PBSA) scheme of 1,085 beds, to be operated by Homes for Students on completion. The 18-month construction programme should be completed by late 2027.

== See also ==
- Albert Dock Seamen's Hospital
