= Canning Town station =

London Underground and Docklands Light Railway station

Canning Town
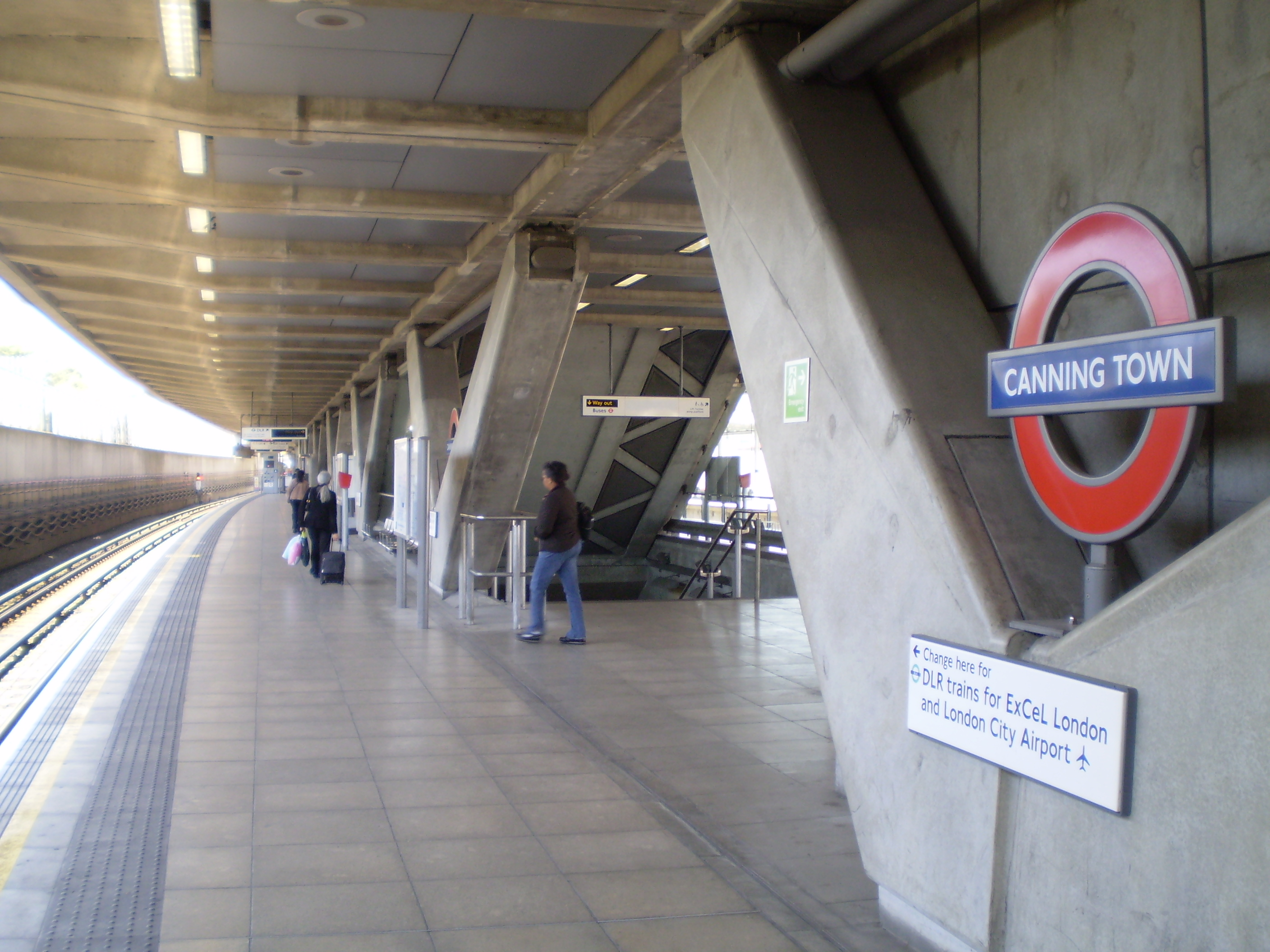
- Jubilee line platforms, with DLR platforms above

General information
- Location: Canning Town, Newham
- Coordinates: 51.5140°N 0.0083°E
- Owner: Transport for London
- Manager: London Underground
- Platforms: 6

Construction
- Accessible: Yes

Other information
- Fare zone: 2 and 3
- Website: Official website

History
- Opened: 14 June 1847
- Former names: Barking Road (1847–1873)
- Original company: Eastern Counties and Thames Junction Railway
- Pre-grouping: Great Eastern Railway
- Post-grouping: London and North Eastern Railway

Key dates
- 1888: Relocated
- 29 May 1994: Second station closed
- 29 October 1995: Third station opened
- 5 March 1998: DLR platforms to Beckton opened
- 14 May 1999: Jubilee line opened
- 2 December 2005: DLR started to King George V
- 9 December 2006: North London service withdrawn
- 31 August 2011: DLR platforms to Stratford International opened

Passengers

London Underground annual entry and exit
- 2021: ▼7.52 million
- 2022: ▲11.59 million
- 2023: ▲12.33 million
- 2024: ▼12.09 million
- 2025: ▼11.91 million

DLR annual entry and exit
- 2021: ▲13.622 million
- 2022: No data (Note: DLR passenger data for 2022 is included in the London Underground figure.)
- 2023: No data (Note: DLR passenger data for 2023 is included in the London Underground figure.)
- 2024: No data (Note: DLR passenger data for 2024 is included in the London Underground figure.)
- 2025: No data (Note: DLR passenger data for 2025 is included in the London Underground figure.)
Location
- Location in Newham

Canning Town is an interchange station located in Canning Town, London. It provides Jubilee line services of the London Underground, and the Docklands Light Railway (DLR). The station is designed as an intermodal metro and bus station, opening in 1999 as part of the Jubilee Line Extension – replacing the original station site north of the A13. It is in London fare zone 2 and 3.

== History ==
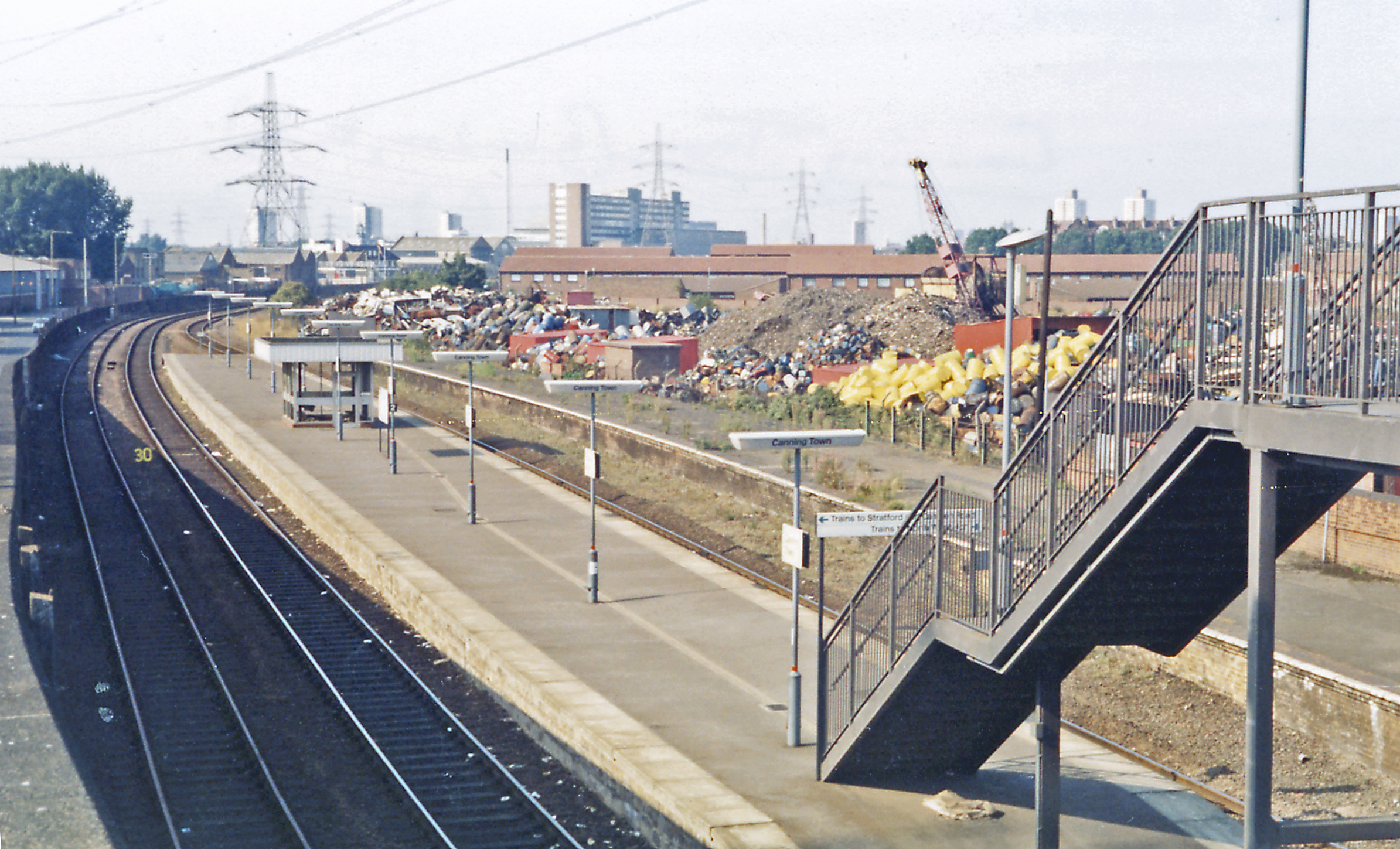
The platforms in 1983 used by the Crosstown Linkline service

=== Early years (1846-1923) ===
A temporary station at Thames Wharf was used between 1846 and 1847 before full opening of the line to North Woolwich.

The first station, originally named Barking Road, was opened on 14 June 1847 by the Eastern Counties and Thames Junction Railway on the south side of Barking Road in the Parish of West Ham. Trains from this station ran from Bishopsgate railway station to North Woolwich railway station where there were ferries available on the Thames to take passengers to Woolwich.

In 1855 a new line was built to serve North Woolwich and this line started at Thames Wharf Junction located south of the station. All passenger services were diverted via this route while the original route, became known as the Silvertown Tramway, and was a freight only route serving dockside and riverside industries. Thames Wharf yard was located just south of the junction and there was also a freight only branch that diverged south of the station and then curved west to Blackwall Pepper Warehouse and further GE wharves. A spur off this led to Canning Town GE goods yard and here rail mounted steam cranes could unload material from boats.

A new curve north of the station was added at Abbey Mills Junction in 1858 which linked the line to the London Tilbury & Southend Railway main line to London Fenchurch Street.

By the 1860s the railways in East Anglia were in financial trouble and most were leased to the Eastern Counties Railway (ECR). Although they wished to amalgamate formally, they could not obtain government agreement for this until 1862, when the Great Eastern Railway (GER) was formed by the amalgamation.

Between 1888 and 1890 the line south of Stratford Bridge was quadrupled to deal with the additional freight traffic. The station had two platforms and a further bay platform was added in 1895 for a service to Victoria Park (and a connection to the North London Railway services to Broad Street.

The station was renamed Canning Town on 1 July 1873, and in 1888, this station was closed, being replaced by a new station on the north side of Barking Road (near Stephenson Street). Immediately east of the station was a sizable goods yard operated by the London and North Western Railway and, after 1923, the London Midland and Scottish Railway.

=== London and North Eastern Railway (1923-1948) ===
Following the 1921 Railways Act the station became the responsibility of the London & North Eastern Railway (LNER) on 1 January 1923. During World War II services to central London were all terminated at Stratford Low Level although a few peak services worked through to Palace Gates.

The station was damaged by air raids during the London Blitz and the tightly packed houses in the nearby streets suffered badly from bomb damage. The service was reduced during the war but during the early part of the war usage of the London Docks was reduced and the dockers reallocated to other ports.

=== British Railways (1948-1994) ===
Canning Town station became an Eastern Region station when the UK railways were nationalised on 1 January 1948. By the 1960s the docks and railways were in decline.

After 1 July 1950 the LNW goods depot it was known as Canning Town North.

The platform awnings and buildings were rationalised in the 1960s.

The LNW goods yard east of the station closed on 6 March 1967 (although a siding remained in situ for some years), and the GER goods yard closed on 1 July 1968.

In 1979 the station was rebuilt. The up platform became an island and the old down goods alignment was utilised for the diverted up line. The platform was also widened and a small ticket office was added.

The station was closed during 1984 to electrify the line with third rail, as part of the Crosstown Linkline. Re-signalling also took place with all lines being controlled by a panel at Stratford and new electric services were introduced on 13 May 1985.

This station closed on 28 May 1994 when the railways in the area were redeveloped and the line closed. Both the Jubilee Line extension and DLR would serve a new station south of the Barking Road Bridge.

=== Jubilee Line Extension and Docklands Light Railway ===
In the late 1980s, plans for the Docklands Light Railway (DLR) extension to Beckton considered various options - either running directly east/west between Blackwall and Royal Victoria, or following the River Lea to call at Canning Town. In the early 1990s, the planned Jubilee Line Extension station on the site meant that the dedicated DLR station was not built, with a combined interchange station to be built instead. The DLR extension to Beckton began running through the future station site in March 1994.

The new station was built on the south side of the A13, designed by Troughton McAslan. The tiered design of the station placed the DLR platforms directly above the Jubilee line platforms allowing for easy interchange. A substantial bus station was also built as part of the station complex.

On 29 October 1995, the first part of the new station opened, serving the North London Line. The DLR platforms opened on 5 March 1998. With the opening of the Jubilee line platforms on 14 May 1999, the new station complex was complete and officially 'opened'.

The DLR branch to London City Airport opened on 2 December 2005. This branch diverges from the branch to Beckton 0.25 miles (0.40 km) south of the interchange, with trains from both branches serving the current platforms.

=== Stratford International DLR extension ===
The North London Line platforms closed on 9 December 2006 as part of the closure of the Stratford to North Woolwich section of the line. On 31 August 2011 these platforms re-opened on the new Stratford International branch of the Docklands Light Railway.

On 11 November 2015, the Mayor of London announced that from January 2016 the station would be rezoned to be on the boundary of London fare zone 2 and 3, having previously solely been zone 3.

In October 2019, the station was disrupted by protests led by the environmental pressure group Extinction Rebellion (XR), causing the suspension of services at rush hour. During the protest, two XR members climbed on top of a Jubilee line train, one of whom appeared to kick commuters who were attempting to remove them. The growing crowd proceeded to throw objects at the protesters before a commuter grabbed them by the ankles and dragged them off the train and onto the platform, where a physical altercation took place.

== Design ==
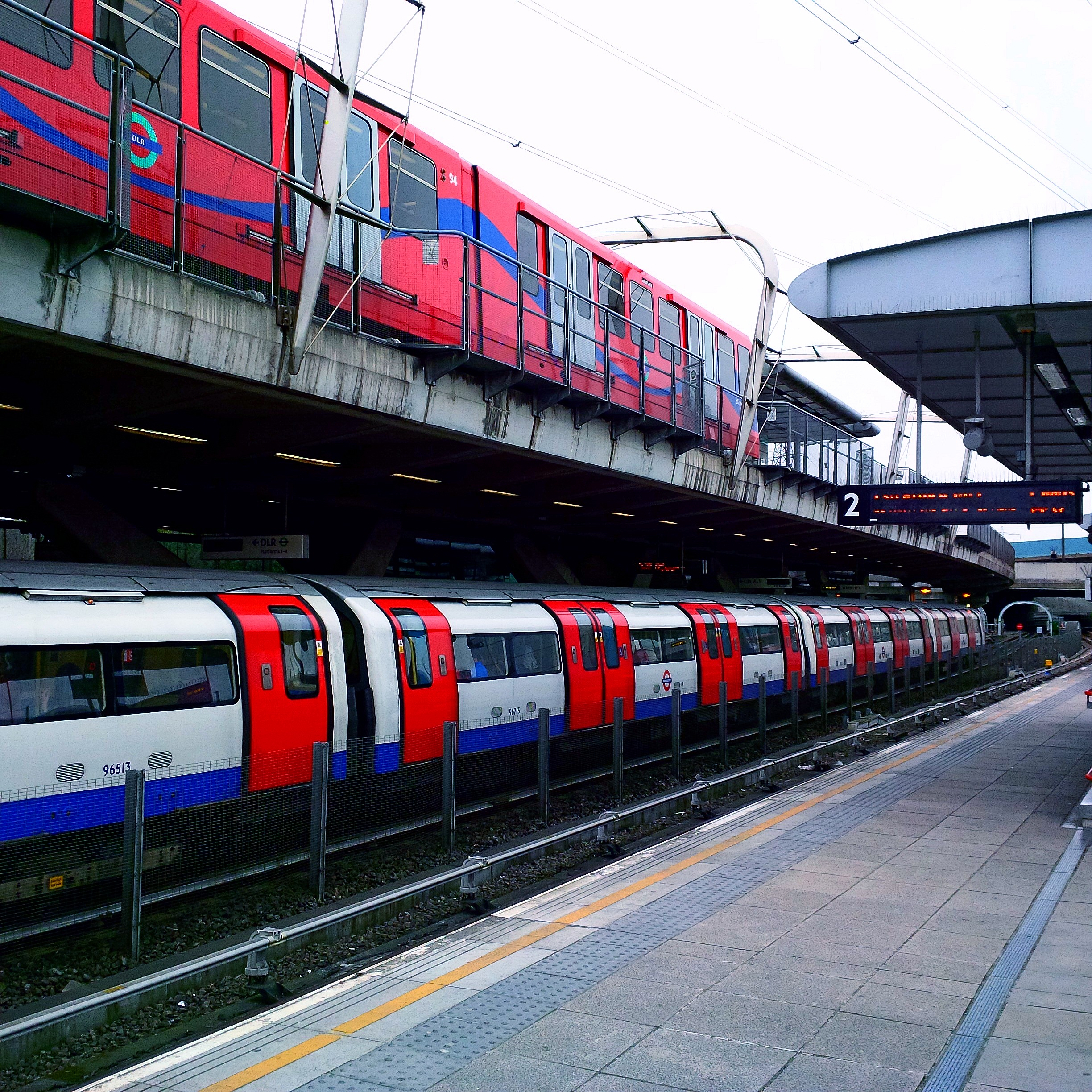
DLR platforms stacked above Jubilee line platforms

Designed by Troughton McAslan, the station is connected by an underground concourse stretching the width of the site and connected to all platforms and the bus station by escalators, stairs and lifts. The station is fully accessible, with step-free access throughout.

To the west of the complex two island platforms are one above the other. The lower level island platform (platforms 5 & 6) is served by the Jubilee line and the higher level island platform (platforms 3 &4) is served by the DLR branch to/from Poplar. To the east of the Jubilee platforms on the same level, an island platform (platforms 1 & 2) is served by the Stratford International branch of the DLR. This platform was formerly served by the North London line.

Adjacent to Silvertown Way, on the eastern side of the interchange is a bus station with seven stands, with an enclosed above-ground concourse with doors to the surrounding bus bays. The bus station is fully connected to the DLR and Underground platforms via the underground concourse.

As well as entrances onto Silvertown Way and Barking Road, an entrance facing Bow Creek allows access to London City Island via the Leamouth Lifting Footbridge, Bow Creek Ecology Park and the Limmo Peninsula. This entrance was built as part of the Jubilee Line Extension project in the late 1990s, but opened in 2016.

=== Artwork ===
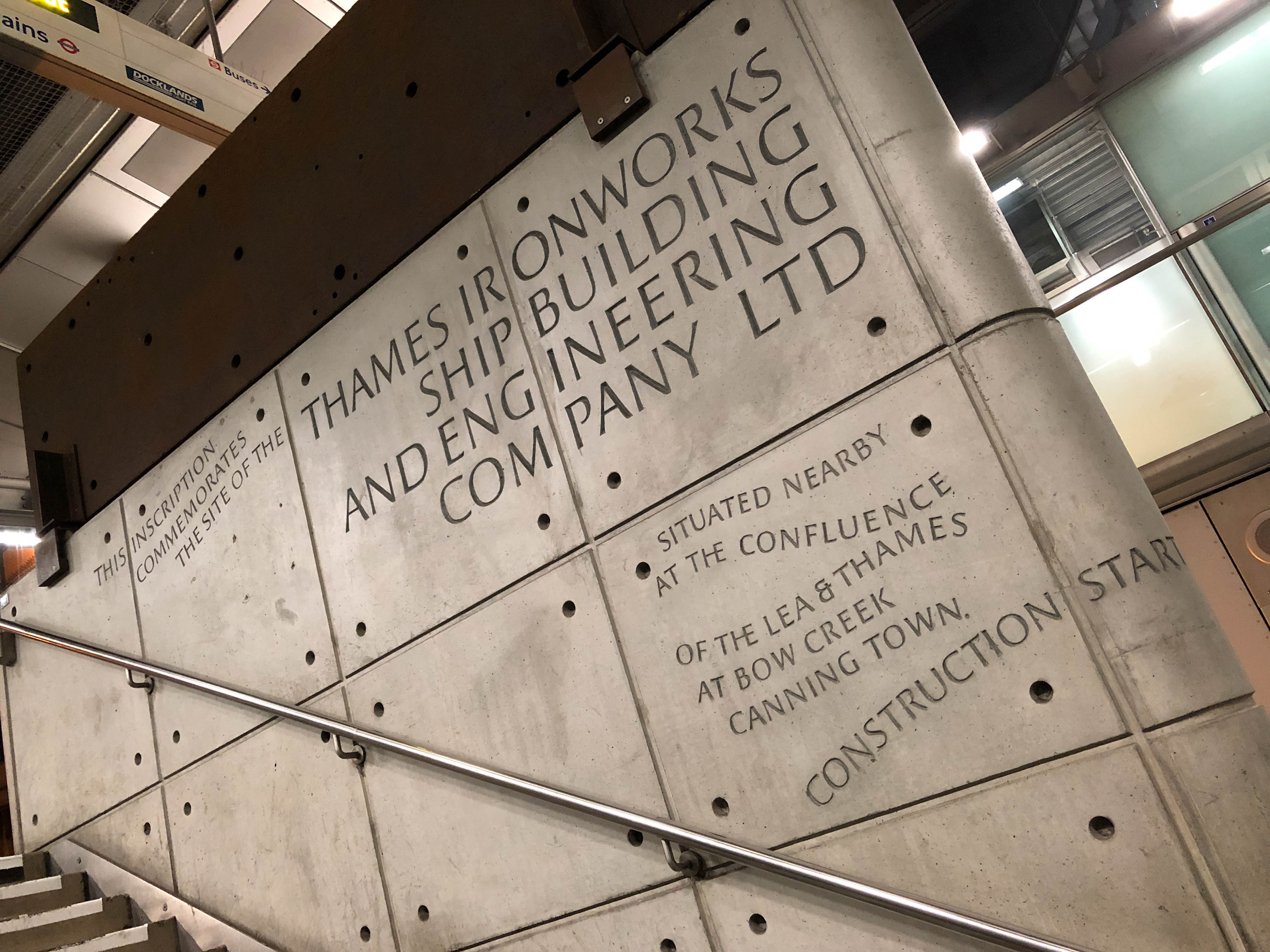
Carving commemorating the Thames Ironworks and Shipbuilding Company by Richard Kindersley

Carved into the walls of a station staircase, an artwork by Richard Kindersley commemorates the Thames Iron Works, which previously stood on the site. It was unveiled in February 1998 by then-Archbishop of Canterbury George Carey, who grew up in the local area.

== Location ==
A major interchange in East London, it is on a north–south alignment, constrained by Bow Creek immediately to the west, Silvertown Way to the east, the A13 Canning Town Flyover (a major east–west road bridge crossing the Canning Town Roundabout at the throat of the station) to the north, and the River Thames to the south, while directly next to the River Lea.

The station is served by day and nighttime London Buses routes.

== Services ==
=== London Underground ===
The typical off-peak London Underground (Jubilee line) service in trains per hour from Canning Town is:

- 24 tph to Stratford
- 4 tph to West Hampstead
- 4 tph to Willesden Green
- 4 tph to Wembley Park
- 12 tph to Stanmore

Additional services call at the station during the peak hours, increasing the service to up to 30 tph in each direction.

The Jubilee line also operates a night service on Friday and Saturday nights as part of the Night Tube with a 6 tph service between Stratford and Stanmore.

=== DLR ===
The typical off-peak DLR service in trains per hour from Canning Town is:

- 6 tph to Tower Gateway
- 6 tph to Bank
- 6 tph to Stratford International
- 12 tph to Beckton
- 12 tph to Woolwich Arsenal

Additional services call at the station during the peak hours, increasing the service to up to 16 tph to Beckton and Woolwich Arsenal and up to 8 tph to Tower Gateway, Bank and Stratford International.

Preceding station	LUL	Following station
North Greenwich towards Stanmore	Jubilee line	West Ham towards Stratford
DLR
East India towards Bank or Tower Gateway	Docklands Light Railway	Royal Victoria towards Beckton
Star Lane towards Stratford International	Docklands Light Railway	West Silvertown towards Woolwich Arsenal
	Disused railways	
West Ham	Silverlink North London Line	Custom House
Stratford Market	British Rail Eastern Region Palace Gates Line	Custom House
