= Beckton DLR station =

Docklands Light Railway station

Beckton
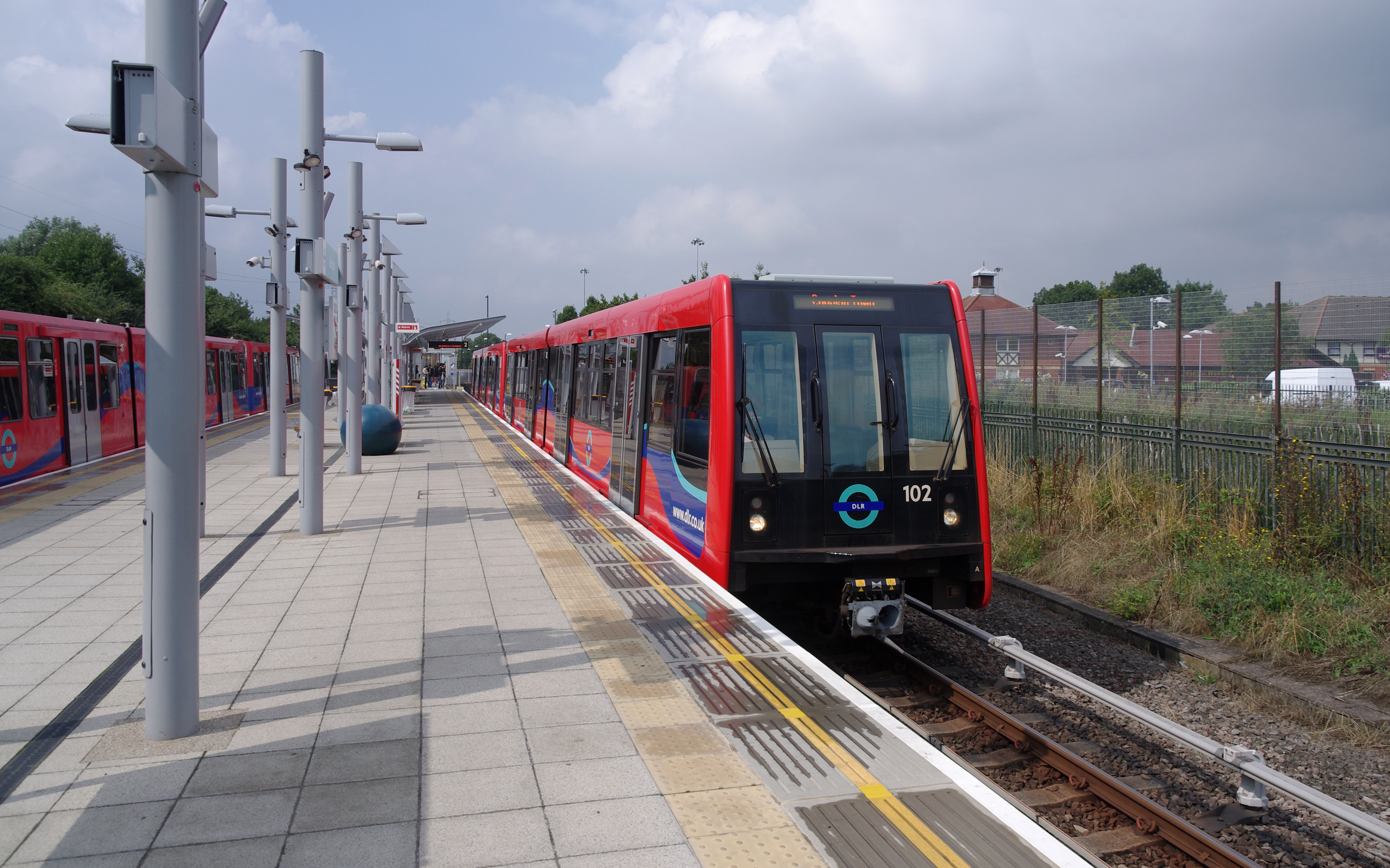
- Platforms in 2013

General information
- Location: Beckton, Newham
- Coordinates: 51.5142°N 0.0616°E
- Owner: Transport for London
- Manager: Docklands Light Railway
- Platforms: 2

Construction
- Structure type: At-grade
- Accessible: Yes

Other information
- Status: Unstaffed
- Fare zone: 3
- Website: Official website

History
- Opened: 28 March 1994

Passengers

DLR annual entry and exit
- 2021: ▼1.373 million
- 2022: ▲2.070 million
- 2023: ▲2.180 million
- 2024: ▼1.97 million
- 2025: ▼1.58 million
Location
- Location in Newham

Beckton is the eastern terminus of the Beckton branch of the Docklands Light Railway (DLR) in the Beckton area of east London. It is in London fare zone 3.

== History ==
When the London Docks and Beckton Gasworks were active, they were served by a railway system. A separate station known as Beckton existed on this earlier network, several hundred yards east of Beckton DLR station, until its closure in December 1940.

In 1973, a government report on the redevelopment of London's Docklands proposed an extension of the unbuilt Fleet line from Charing Cross via Fenchurch Street to Beckton. The proposal was developed during the 1970s as the Fleet line developed into the Jubilee line. The route was approved in 1980 with the main route running via Custom House and Silvertown to Woolwich Arsenal. Beckton would have been the terminus of a branch line operated as a shuttle service from Custom House. Financial constraints meant that the route was not proceeded with. By the start of the 1990s new plans had been developed to extend the Jubilee line on a route south of the River Thames towards Stratford.

The DLR branch from Poplar was opened on 28 March 1994. The station was originally in London fare zone 4 and was moved to London fare zone 3 in January 2000.

== Location ==
The next station is Gallions Reach, but between the two stations the line curves through 180 degrees, such that westbound trains for Central London depart Beckton heading east. Beckton station is located north and slightly further west of Cyprus, the station after Gallions Reach. During peak hours, trains from Beckton depart for Tower Gateway and Bank. Off-peak, trains alternate between Tower Gateway and Canning Town station.

Beckton DLR depot, the principal depot for the DLR system, is located between Beckton and Gallions Reach stations, but is closer to the latter.

Like all open-air DLR stations, Beckton is unstaffed and tickets are bought at the ticket machines. New machines were installed in January 2009 that now allow Oyster card users to top-up their pre-pay balance and see their journey history. During 2007–2008, a new bus station was constructed directly opposite the DLR station. This opened in the first week of November 2008.

== Services ==
The typical off-peak service in trains per hour from Beckton is:

- 12 tph to Canning Town of which 6 continue to Tower Gateway

Additional services run to and from the station during the peak hours, increasing the service to up to 16 tph in each direction.

Preceding station	DLR	Following station
Gallions Reach towards Tower Gateway	Docklands Light Railway	Terminus

== Connections ==
There is a bus station directly in front of the station offering services right across East London.
