= Tower Gateway DLR station =

Docklands Light Railway station

Tower Gateway
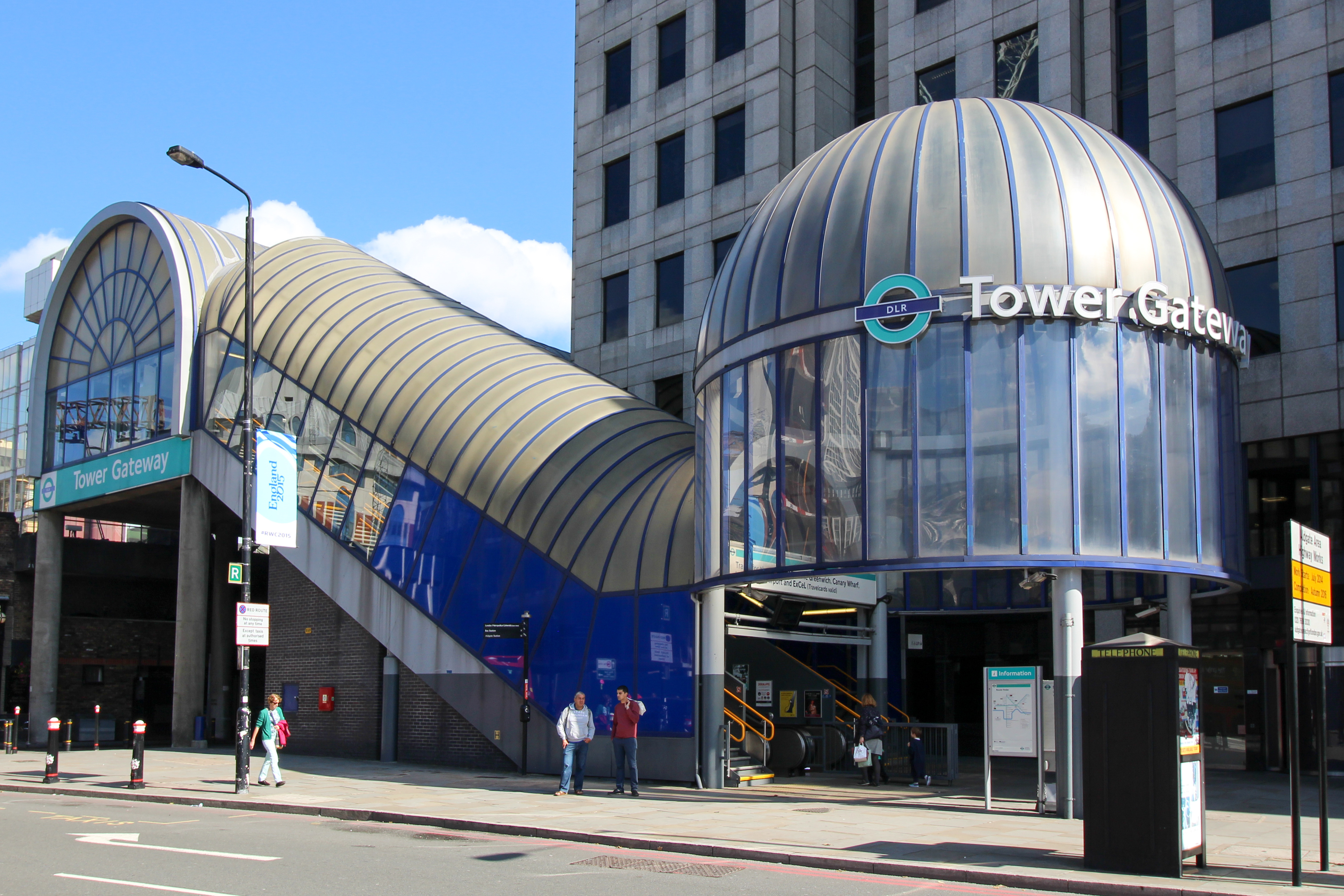
- Station entrance in 2015

General information
- Location: Tower, City of London
- Coordinates: 51.5104°N 0.0746°W
- Owned by: Transport for London
- Managed by: Docklands Light Railway
- Platforms: 2
- Tracks: 1
- Connections: Out-of-station interchanges: Aldgate; Fenchurch Street; Tower Hill

Construction
- Structure type: Elevated
- Accessible: Yes

Other information
- Status: Unstaffed
- Fare zone: 2
- Website: Edit this at Wikidata

History
- Opened: 31 August 1987

Passengers

DLR annual entry and exit
- 2020: ▼1.344 million
- 2021: ▲2.401 million
- 2022: ▲3.130 million
- 2023: ▲3.140 million
- 2024: ▼2.63 million
Location
- Location in the City of London

Tower Gateway is a Docklands Light Railway (DLR) station in the City of London and is located near the Tower of London and Tower Bridge. It adjoins the tracks to Fenchurch Street station and is located on the site of a former station called Minories. Tower Gateway is within London fare zone 1.

It is a short walk from both Tower Hill Underground station and Fenchurch Street. Access at street level from the Minories is via escalator, stairs or lift at the western end of the station. A pedestrian crossing connects the station with Tower Hill station, its closest London Underground connection. A narrow secondary staircase entrance at the eastern end of the platform, improved considerably in the early 2000s, descends to Mansell Street. It serves the eastern edge of the City of London central business district and development around St Katharine Docks.

== History ==
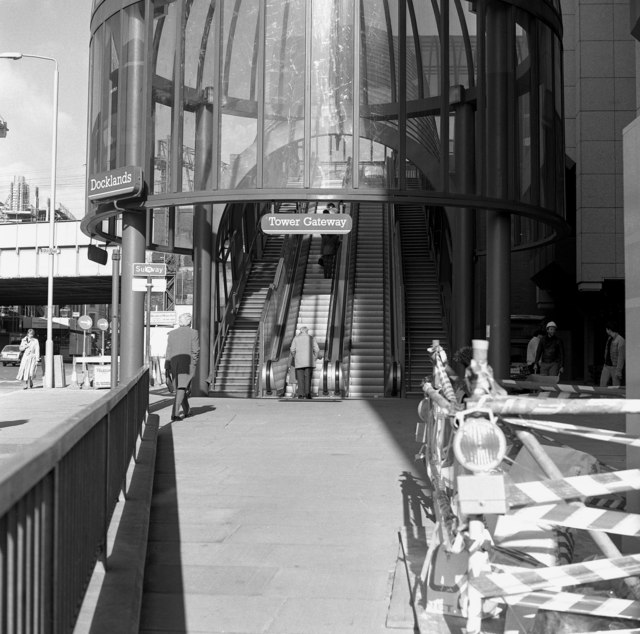
The entrance to the station seen in 1988

It was opened in 1987 as the western terminus of the initial DLR system and the station closest to central London.

The underground extension to Bank, which opened in 1991, diverges from the original route between Tower Gateway and Shadwell, the next station to the east. It dives down a steep ramp not far from the eastern end of the platforms, from which it is clearly visible. Tower Gateway is the terminus for the less busy service to Beckton. Journeys to other branches of the DLR normally require a change.

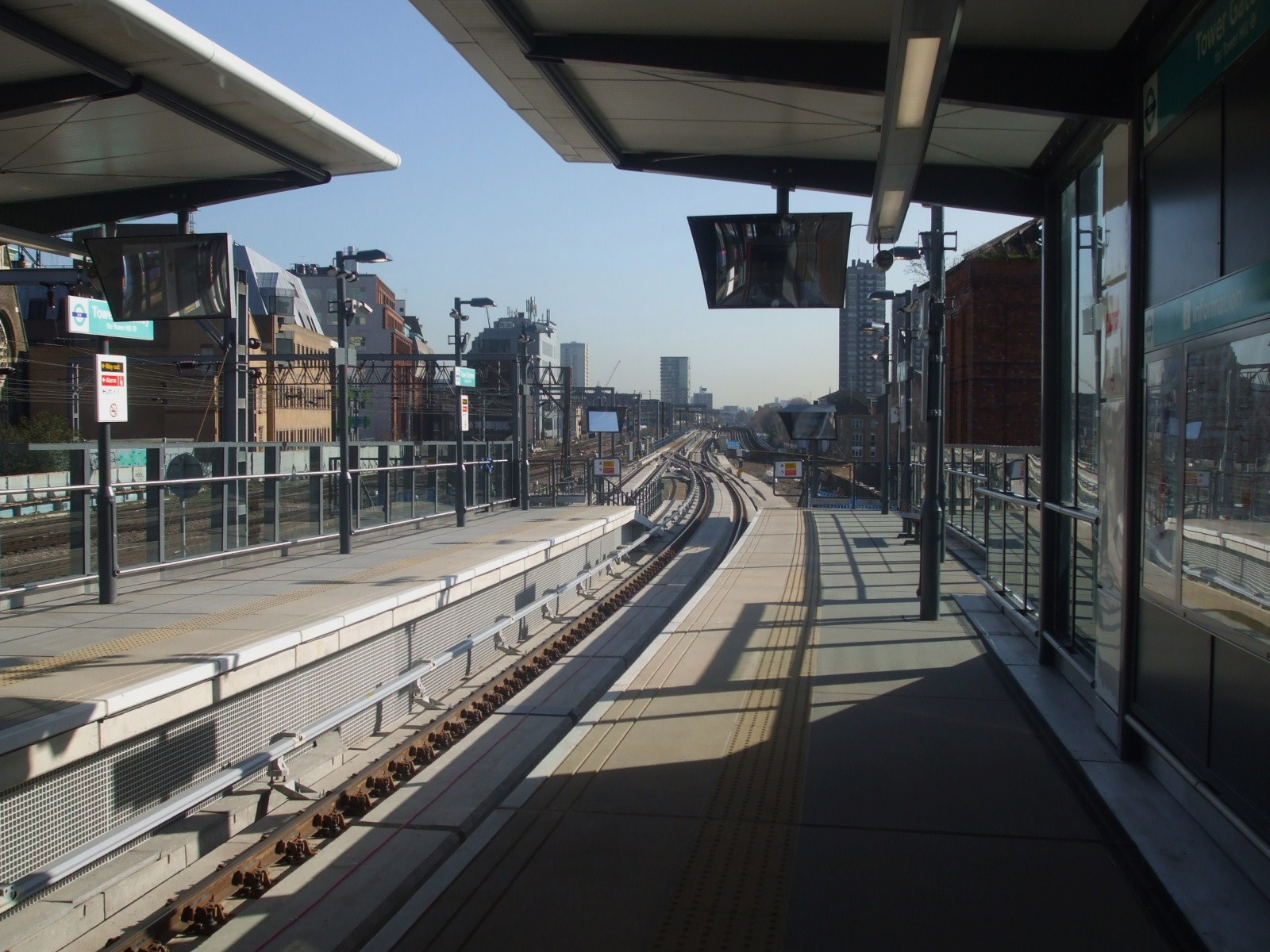
View east from the station after remodelling

In keeping with the DLR's original basic lightweight philosophy, Tower Gateway is a simple elevated terminus. As built it had two tracks and a cross-over. When the extension to Bank opened, its importance was substantially reduced. Before reconstruction it had a fairly narrow central platform, and a single track leading from the main route to a set of points immediately prior to the platforms.

Further major alterations began on 30 June 2008. The station reopened on 2 March 2009, rebuilt as a single-track terminus to enable three-car trains with a platform on each side of the train, one for arriving passengers and the other for departures (the Spanish solution).

== Services ==
The typical off-peak service in trains per hour from Tower Gateway is 6 tph to and from Beckton via Canning Town. Additional services run to and from the station during the peak hours, increasing the service up to 8 tph to and from the station.

Preceding station	DLR	Following station
Terminus	Docklands Light Railway	Shadwell towards Beckton

== Future ==
A Transport Supporting Paper released by the office of the Mayor of London in 2014 envisages the closure of Tower Gateway DLR station and the branch serving it, with a replacement interchange being provided via a new station on the Bank branch connected to Tower Hill station. The reasoning is given that currently, 90 per cent of DLR City passengers use Bank station, but only 75 per cent of services go there; this would increase service to Bank from 23tph to 30tph, thereby unlocking more capacity on the Bank branch. In exchange, services from Fenchurch Street railway station might move to the current Tower Gateway location.

== Connections ==
London Buses routes 42, 78, 100, 343 and night route N551 serve the station.
