= Woolwich station =

Woolwich station may refer to:

== Transport ==
- Woolwich railway station, on the Elizabeth line in south east London, United Kingdom
- Woolwich Arsenal station, a National Rail and Docklands Light Railway interchange in south east London
- Woolwich Dockyard railway station, a National Rail station in south east London
- North Woolwich railway station, a closed National Rail station situated north of the river Thames
  - North Woolwich Old Station Museum, a small railway museum (closed)

== Other uses ==
- Woolwich Fire Station in south east London
- Woolwich Power Station in south east London
- North Woolwich Old Station Museum
