= North Woolwich =

Area of Newham in London, England

Coordinates: 51.501°N 0.058°E

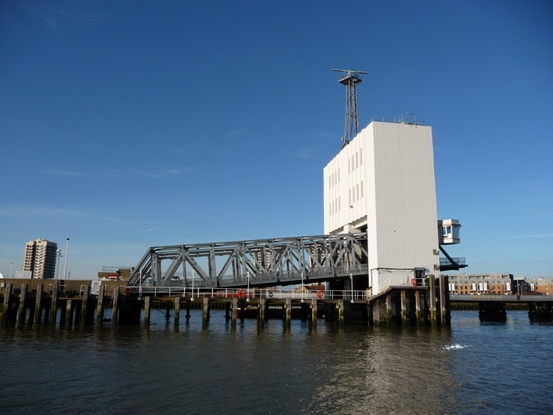
- North Woolwich ferry terminal

- Location within Greater London
- OS grid reference: TQ435795
  - Charing Cross: 8 mi (12.9 km) WNW
- London borough: Newham
- Ceremonial county: Greater London
- Region: London
- Country: England
- Sovereign state: United Kingdom
- Post town: LONDON
- Postcode district: E16
- Dialling code: 020
- Police: Metropolitan
- Fire: London
- Ambulance: London
- UK Parliament: West Ham and Beckton
- London Assembly: City and East

North Woolwich is an area in the London Borough of Newham in East London, England, on the northern bank of the River Thames, across the river from Woolwich. It is connected to Woolwich by the Woolwich Ferry and Woolwich foot tunnel.

Despite lying on the northern, Essex, side of the Thames, the area was within the historic county of Kent. It was part of the parish of Woolwich in the Blackheath hundred, but since 1965 has been in Greater London. Its position within Kent was an arrangement most likely imposed in the aftermath of the Norman Conquest of England from 1066.

== History ==
=== Toponymy ===
The placename North Woolwich was probably taken from North Woolwich railway station which opened in 1847 and closed in 2006; before that, the area was referred to by terms such as "Woolwich in Essex", "Kent in Essex" and "detached Woolwich".

=== Local government ===
The area now called North Woolwich was originally in the eastern part of the Manor of Ham, in the Becontree hundred of Essex; a territory that was subsequently divided into the more familiar West and East Ham, sometime in the 12th century. North Woolwich appears to have been separated a century or so before that time, following the Norman conquest.

Having defeated the English, William the Conqueror rewarded his followers and consolidated his rule, by dividing the lands of his new Kingdom between them. Amongst the foremost of these was Hamo, Steward to the king and Sheriff of Kent, who was given manors in Essex, Kent and Surrey.

The Domesday Book of 1086 shows Hamo as holding land on both sides of the river as part of the manor of Woolwich. The widely held view is that the upheaval of the conquest gave Hamo an opportunity to attach some of his land in Essex to his manor of Woolwich and by extension to his Sheriffdom of Kent. In so doing he became both lord of the manor and Sheriff on both sides of the ferry crossing, an arrangement that allowed him to more effectively tax the revenues of the ferry. This enhanced control of the crossing may also have given him personal military and political advantages.

The parish of Woolwich developed from the manor, and administered North Woolwich until 1889 when it was replaced by the Metropolitan Borough of Woolwich and made part of the new County of London. The neighbouring areas' local authorities of East Ham, West Ham and Barking, while also heavily urbanised, were excluded from the new London authority to remain in Essex; and so North Woolwich remained an anomaly at county level.

Local administration changed again in 1965, with the creation of the London Borough of Newham as part of a new Greater London area. North Woolwich joined West Ham, East Ham and other areas between the rivers Lea, Thames and Roding to form an authority which effectively reestablished the old area of Ham.

The administrative association with Woolwich ended at that time, and Woolwich itself became part of a new London Borough of Greenwich, whereas North Woolwich became part of the London Borough of Newham.

=== Urban development ===
It appears that a hamlet in the area was destroyed by medieval floods and the area remained uninhabited from that time until the 19th century.

The area was formerly the site of industries including the cable works of W. T. Henley (later Associated Electrical Industries) and the Western Electric Company (later Standard Telephones and Cables) on the river to the west of the ferry, and a large Harland & Wolff ship building and repair shop at Gallions Point to the south of the King George V Dock entrance lock (not to be confused with their works at the western end of the dock). Often on the day of launch of a new ship, the company would invite children from the local primary school (Storey Street, now closed) to witness the event.

The population peaked just before the First World War, and reduced substantially in the Second World War when it was heavily bombed.

In the last decade, North Woolwich has seen major redevelopment as part of wider urban regeneration across the Royal Docks, including the ongoing redevelopment of the former North Woolwich railway station site (the redevelopment is of the former goods yard rather than the station building) to provide 348 homes, as well as 75 new homes at Woolwich Reach and 163 apartments at Stories Wharf, in the vicinity of the Woolwich ferry terminal.

== Geography ==
Unlike many areas of London, North Woolwich had formally defined boundaries by which it comprised two separate tracts of riverside land. The smaller and more westerly part, containing 68 acres (28 ha), extended west for about 1/2 mile (800 m) from North Woolwich station. The larger detached part, further fragmented by dock facilities, extended east from the Royal Victoria Gardens. However as in many areas of London, informal local definitions of districts are more nuanced

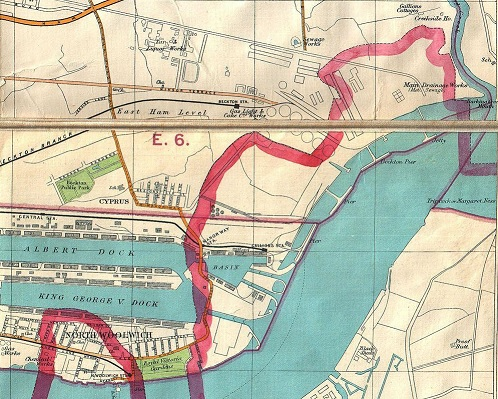
The formal boundaries of North Woolwich about 1917.

Most of Pier Road and the Royal Victoria Gardens, as well as King George V DLR station, are, strictly speaking, in a finger of East Ham surrounded by North Woolwich. However, as is so often the case in London, formal boundaries have not proved the deciding factor in defining local areas, and this part of East Ham has also long been regarded as being part of North Woolwich.

Conversely, the area of the eastern part that lies north of the docks – an area of employment land, infrastructure facilities and post-industrial dereliction, with very few residents – is more usually seen as being part of Beckton, an area that has never had any formal definition.

In summary, the area now commonly considered as North Woolwich differs markedly from the two areas which formerly had the association with Woolwich, covering a smaller area but with a higher population. It could now be said to consist of the area to the south of King George V Dock and Lock, east of the boundary with the Silvertown area of West Ham.

=== Nearby places ===
- Woolwich
- Silvertown
- Custom House
- Beckton

The nearest Docklands Light Railway station is King George V.

== Transport ==
The King George V DLR station is North Woolwich's principal public transport asset, offering direct links to the City, Canary Wharf (via Poplar), Stratford and Woolwich.

The extension of the Docklands Light Railway to the area opened in December 2005. Until 2009, this terminated at King George V; a further extension under the river to Woolwich Arsenal opened in 2009.

The disused North Woolwich railway station, which was closed in preparation for future transport developments which will use sections of the line, is situated adjacent to the ferry terminal. This situation means that North Woolwich now sports two old station buildings. The closed North London Line station is adjacent to an earlier station which closed in 1979; this housed the Old Station Museum from 1984 until it closed in 2008, which was devoted to the history of the Great Eastern and London and North Eastern railways.

North Woolwich is also linked to Woolwich, to its south, by the Woolwich Free Ferry (which connects the North Circular and South Circular roads) and the Woolwich foot tunnel.

North Woolwich is served by London Buses routes 473, 474 and SL2 which provide connections to Stratford, Canning Town, Beckton, Manor Park, Barking, Ilford and Walthamstow.

== Gallery ==
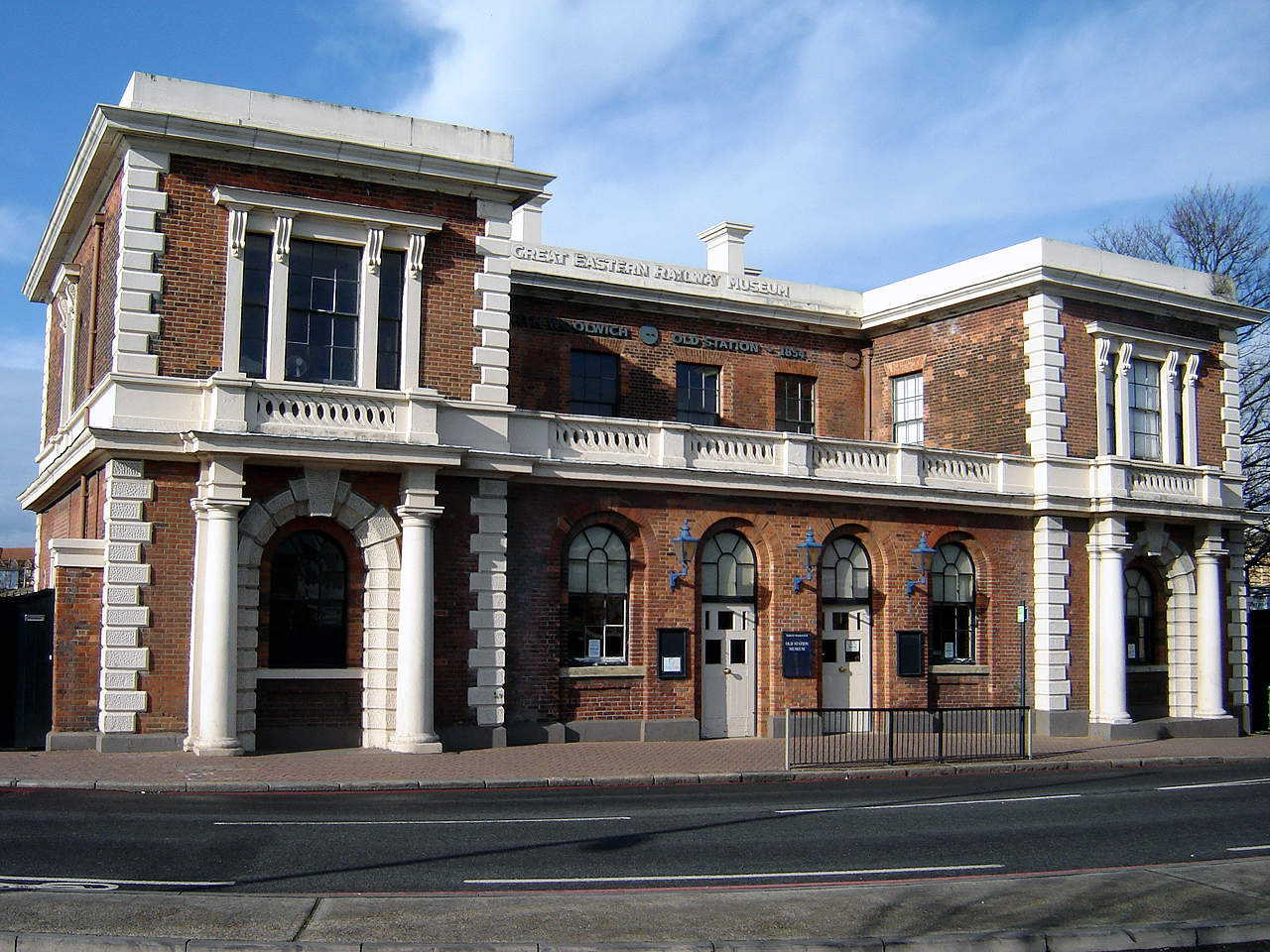
North Woolwich old railway museum frontage. (February 2007)

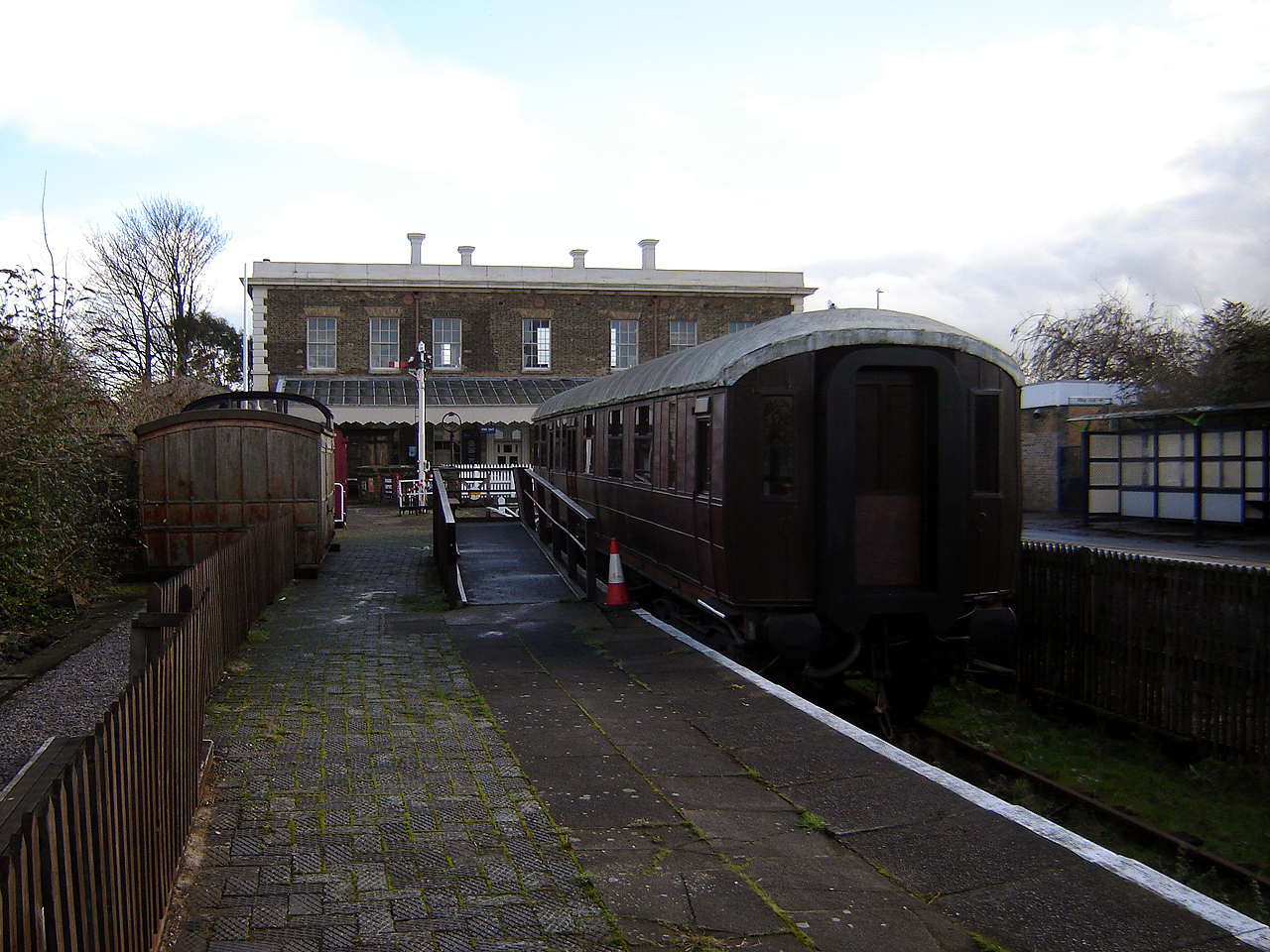
North Woolwich old railway museum. The platform for the closed North London Line station is visible on the far right. (February 2007)
