= Royal Docks Heritage Railway =

Proposed railway

Coordinates: 51.4994°N 0.0623°E

The Royal Docks Heritage Railway, endorsed in 2006 by Newham London Borough Council, was proposed to open during 2007, taking over the North Woolwich Old Station Museum and the closed section of the North London Line between Custom House and North Woolwich railway stations. Rather than concentrating on the Great Eastern Railway, it would have shown the heritage of local and suburban National Rail lines in London and the south east.

The idea was to re-double the track between stations and run heritage train services and training trains. At closure, North London Line services used only one track, but the second track was in place for much of the route. The line might have been Britain's first mainline electric preserved railway. The 1980s station building was to be the public entrance to the museum site. The former official website included details of the visions for the museum plus pictures of the line, taken from a special train run the day after the last public service.

== RailSchool ==
The Royal Docks Heritage Railway was associated with a separate training organisation called RailSchool. The British Rail Class 50 diesel locomotive No. 50033 Glorious was to be lent to RailSchool by Swindon Steam Railway Museum.

== List of Stations along Royal Docks Heritage Route ==
- Custom House
- Connaught (Halt)
- Silvertown
- Albert Road (Halt)
- North Woolwich

== End of the project ==
Later approval of the Crossrail project, re-using most of the proposed heritage railway route, effectively killed the scheme.
