= North Woolwich railway station =

Former railway station in London

North Woolwich
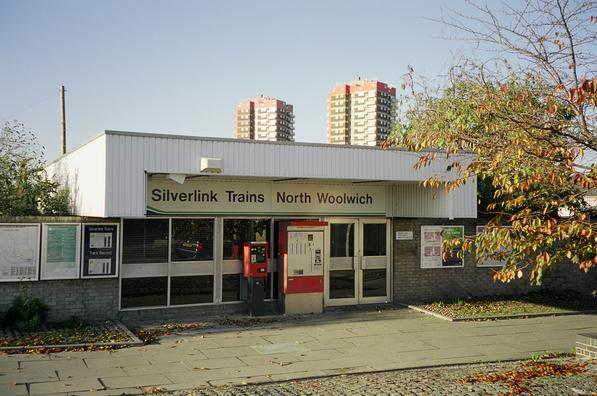
- North Woolwich station in 2005, prior to closure

General information
- Location: North Woolwich, Newham, London; England
- Coordinates: 51.4994°N 0.0623°E
- Owned by: Network Rail
- Managed by: Silverlink
- Platforms: 1

Other information
- Station code: NWW
- Fare zone: 3

History
- Original company: Eastern Counties Railway
- Pre-grouping: Great Eastern Railway
- Post-grouping: London and North Eastern Railway

Key dates
- 14 June 1847: Opened
- 29 May 1994: Closed for JLE works
- 29 October 1995: Reopened
- 9 December 2006: Closed

Passengers
- National Rail entry and exit
- 2004/05: ▲146,908
- 2005/06: ▼118,920
- 2006/07: ▲375,126
Location

North Woolwich railway station in North Woolwich in east London was the eastern terminus of the North London line. The station closed in 2006, to allow for the North London line between Stratford and Canning Town to be converted to Docklands Light Railway (DLR) operation. The local area is now served by the nearby King George V DLR station. The historic station building (built by Sir William Tite in 1847) was Grade II-listed in 1998.

== History ==
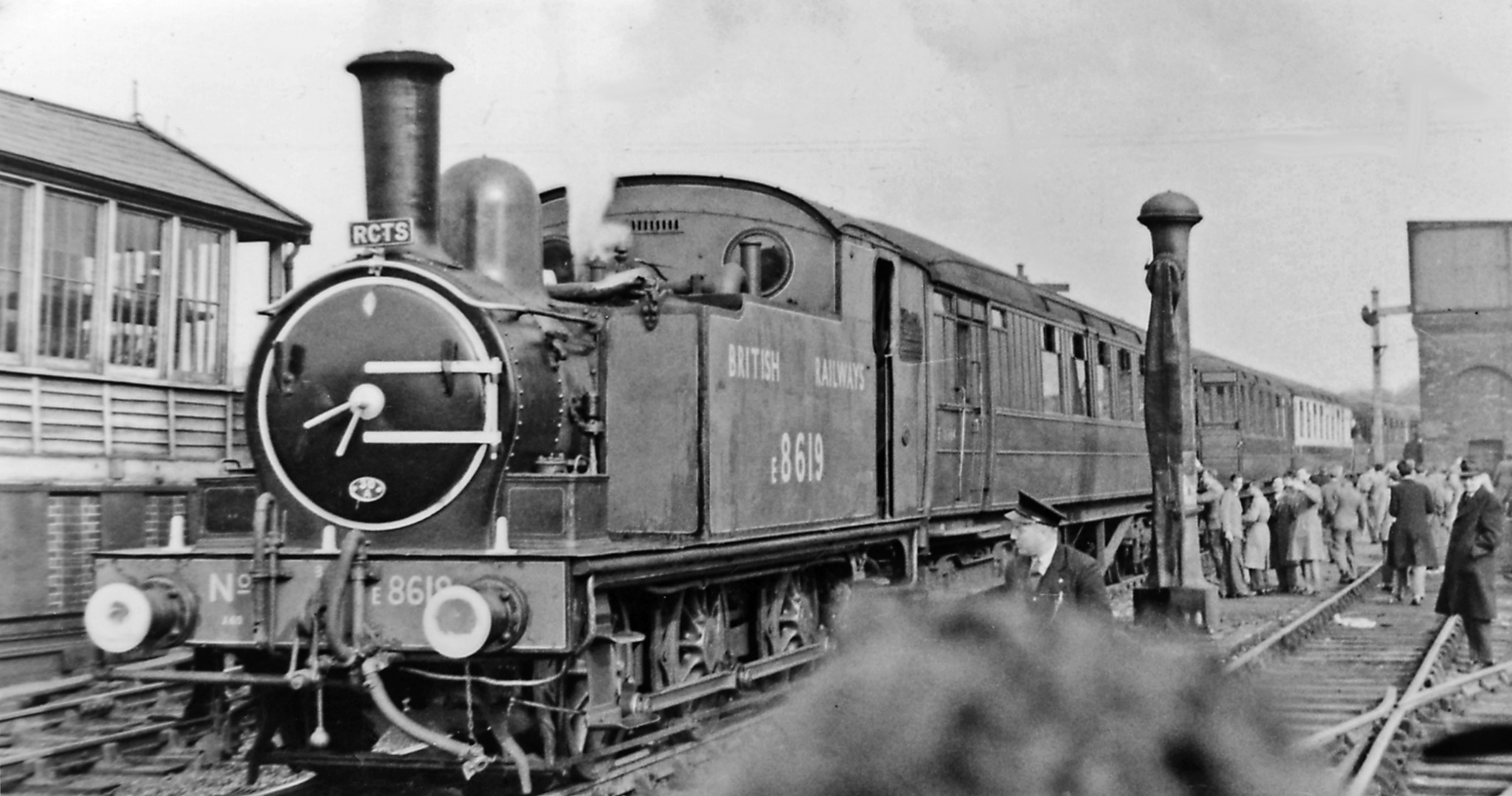
RCTS East London Tour in 1951

The station opened on 14 June 1847 as the southern terminus of the Eastern Counties and Thames Junction Railway from Stratford. The station building itself was designed by Sir William Tite. The service was later extended beyond Stratford to Palace Gates. In 1963 diesel traction replaced steam and the service was cut back to Stratford with peak-hour trains to Tottenham Hale.

=== North London line ===
The route became an extension of the North London line (NLL) in 1979. In 1979, the original station building and a platform were closed, being replaced by a minimalist entrance and passenger shelter on the south side. From the 1980s onward, only one track of the double track line was used through the Connaught Tunnel under the Royal Docks and on to North Woolwich.

In 1985 the line from North Woolwich was electrified on the third rail system under British Rail, with the service running round inner north London to Richmond (a route part-third rail and part-overhead wire). Prior to closure, the typical service frequency Monday to Saturday was every 30 minutes during the daytime, increasing to every 20 minutes in the evening and every 30 minutes all day Sunday.

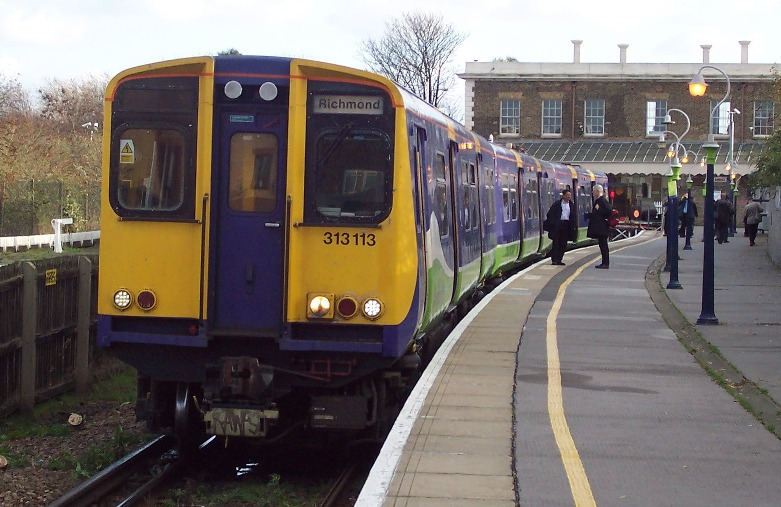
Class 313 waiting to depart a few days before the station closed.

For a period of about 18 months, from May 1994 until October 1995, the line from North Woolwich to Stratford (Low Level) closed temporarily during the Jubilee Line Extension (JLE) which involved reconstruction on the platforms at West Ham and Canning Town stations. A replacement bus was in place during this time. In 1998, the original station building was Grade II-listed.

From 1984 until 2008 the original station buildings and one disused platform served as the North Woolwich Old Station Museum, dedicated to the history of the Great Eastern Railway. The building was then owned by the Passmore Edwards Museum Trust and run by the London Borough of Newham. On its closure most of the collection was dispersed and the building passed to the Trust's successor, the River Lea Tidal Mill Trust.

=== Station closure ===
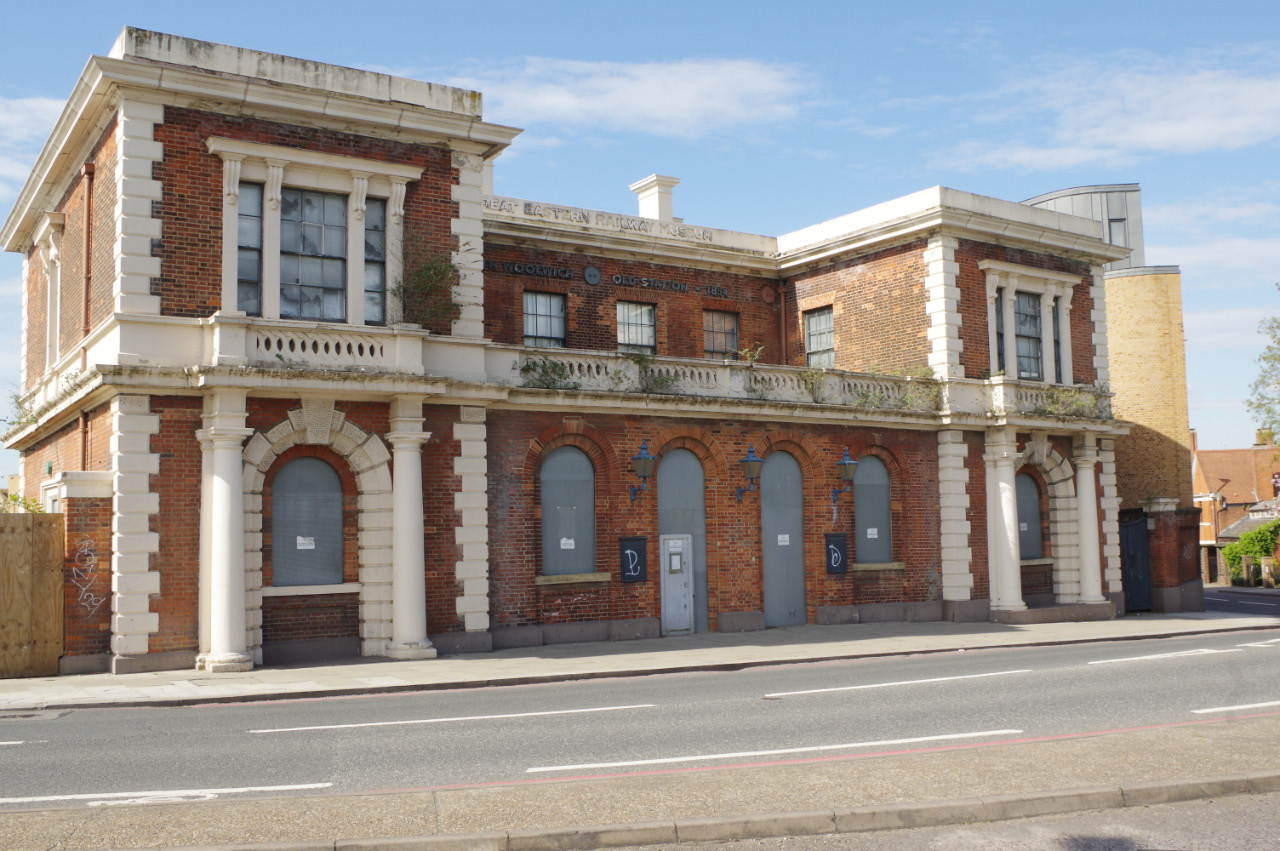
The historic station building in 2017, following the closure of the North Woolwich Old Station Museum

The station and the line to Stratford closed on 9 December 2006 to allow conversion of the North London line between Stratford and Canning Town to a Docklands Light Railway (DLR) line. At closure the station was served by Silverlink. Following the opening of the DLR extension to London City Airport in 2005, the area was better served by more frequent services from King George V DLR station. Following the extension of the line to Woolwich Arsenal in 2009, a rapid transit connection across the Thames was provided for the first time.

== Future ==
The Elizabeth line uses the Connaught Tunnel and nearby NLL route, with a new tunnel under the River Thames near the site of North Woolwich station. This prevents any future use of the station for railway purposes - preventing two proposed schemes for using the short section of railway track near the station:

- The North Woolwich Old Station Museum mentioned above.
- The Royal Docks Heritage Railway proposed a new museum at the site with a heritage railway.

Ownership of the station site passed to the House Mill Trust after closure, but high maintenance costs led to it being sold on to a property investment firm, Sav Group, in 2018, with the station building and trackbed subsequently being purchased in 2021 by the New Covenant Church.

In 2023 plans were submitted to redevelop the former goods yard with apartments, a café and a commercial space.

Disused railways
Preceding station	National Rail	Following station
Silvertown towards Richmond	Silverlink North London Line	Terminus
