= Woolwich Works =

Culture venue in Woolwich, London

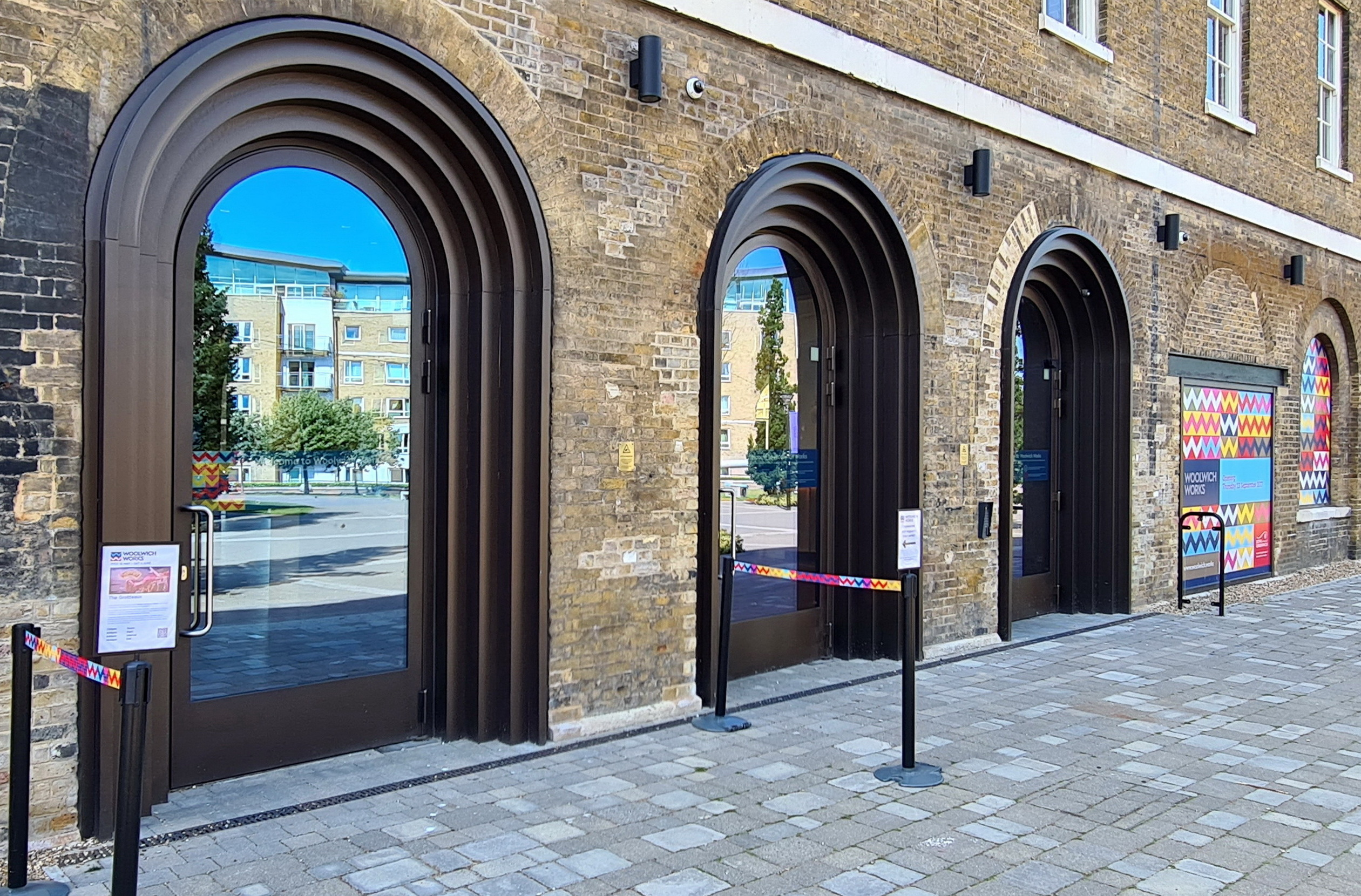
- Entrance of Fireworks Factory & Workers' Yard (Building 41/41A), part of Woolwich Works
- Interactive map of Woolwich Works
- Address: Artillery Square / No 1 Street / Cartridge Place / Carriage Street; SE18 London, United Kingdom
- Coordinates: 51°29′38.83″N 0°4′12.63″E
- Owner: Royal Borough of Greenwich
- Operator: Woolwich Works Trust
- Capacity: 1200 (The Fireworks)
- Type: Artistic venues: The Academy, The Fireworks Factory, Workers' Yard, The Cartridge Factory, The Laboratory and The Carriageworks
- Public transit: Woolwich; Woolwich Arsenal

Construction
- Opened: September 23, 2021
- Architect: Bennetts Associates (refurbishments)

Tenants
- National Youth Jazz Orchestra, Chineke! Orchestra, Punchdrunk, Protein and Woolwich Contemporary Print Fair

Website
- www.woolwich.works

Woolwich Works, also known as Woolwich Creative District, is a multi-disciplinary cultural venue on the south bank of the River Thames in Woolwich in southeast London, that opened in September 2021.

It occupies a range of historic buildings at the Royal Arsenal, and includes a 1200-seat auditorium for concerts and events, a performance courtyard that seats up to 600, as well as offices, television studios and rehearsal spaces for resident companies. Future phases will include a 450-seat black box theatre and a riverside restaurant. Woolwich Works is situated close to the Royal Arsenal Pier and the new Woolwich Elizabeth line station.

== History ==
The development of a creative district in the Royal Arsenal was intended as part of the regeneration of the site that started in the mid 1990s, after the Arsenal ceased to be a military establishment. It is also seen as part of the wider regeneration of the Woolwich town centre.

In October 2018, planning permission was granted by Greenwich Council for the first phase of a restoration of five listed buildings in the historic Royal Arsenal, estimated at a cost of £31.6 million. The aim was to create a 15,000sqm complex of theatres, rehearsal studios, exhibition spaces and restaurants. Originally this development was known as 'Woolwich Creative District' but names of the district and individual buildings were later put to the public vote and in July 2019 the name 'Woolwich Works' was announced. The opening took place on September 23, 2021. The final bill came in at £45.6 million. It was anticipated that the new creative district will provide more than 400 local jobs. Chief executive is James Heaton.

In June 2022 Woolwich Works reported being in financial difficulties and sought a two million pound loan from Greenwich Council. The Council indicated that it was minded to grant such a loan subject to various conditions.

== Current use ==
Woolwich Works offers a variety of music, dance and theatre experiences, with an emphasis on contemporary and popular music, and stand-up comedy. It is also the home of the National Youth Jazz Orchestra, the multicultural Chineke! Orchestra, theatre company Punchdrunk, and dance company Protein. The Woolwich Contemporary Print Fair has been using the premises since 2016, long before Woolwich Works was established, and will continue to do so. The venue is also for hire for weddings, parties and conferences.

== Facilities ==
The buildings that make up Woolwich Works are grouped in two clusters, located to the west and east of No 1 Street. The cluster on the west side of No 1 Street consists of two listed buildings: Building 40 and Building 41/41A; the cluster on the east side of No 1 Street comprises three listed buildings, Building 17, Building 18 and Building 19 (along with a modern structure between Buildings 17 and 18). The numbers refer to the Ministry of Defence building numbers.

As of 2022 the buildings have been renamed as follows:

=== Academy ===
Building 40, the Old Royal Military Academy, is a freestanding building overlooking Artillery Square. It was built in 1718–23 on the site of a Tudor mansion named Tower Place. The brown-brick east façade has rich ornamentation. Behind the main façade were two principal rooms, either side of an 'entrance saloon': to the north, the Board Room (a meeting-cum-dining room for the Board of Ordnance); and to the south, the Academy Room (for the training of recruits to the Board's military corps: the Royal Artillery and the Royal Engineers). Until 1807 the wing beyond the entrance saloon, to the west, housed the Ordnance Storekeeper (he had previously lived in Tower Place).

After a period of delay, what became the Royal Military Academy was formally opened in 1741; it remained in the building until 1806, after which it moved to new premises on Woolwich Common. The old building was then taken over by the Royal Laboratory, which used it to store patterns, and converted the Storekeeper's house into chemical laboratories. After the First World War the building served as the Royal Arsenal Officers' Mess, until the closure of the Arsenal in 1994. It was then briefly used by the Royal Artillery Museum and now houses Academy Performing Arts (part of Woolwich Works).

=== Workers' Yard ===
Building 41, formerly known as New Laboratory Square, consists of a quadrangle around a courtyard. The western elevation is the oldest part, designed by James Wyatt as a storehouse for naval ordnance supplies in 1783. In 1808–10 the north and east wings were added as storehouses. By 1860 the complex had been taken over by the Royal Laboratory, mainly for the manufacture of ammunition for small arms. The From 2003–18 Greenwich Heritage Centre was located in the west range of the quadrangle. The courtyard, which can be used as a performance space for 600 visitors, is referred to as Workers' Yard. The central courtyard is used as an open air performance space. Around it are a number of venues for hire, the names of which reflect the former trades carried out there (e.g. Coopers Studio, Stitchers Studio, Ropekeepers Studio) and people who lived and worked in the area (e.g. Knight Gallery). The main entrance is at No 1 Street.

=== Fireworks Factory ===
Building 41A forms the south elevation of the quadrangle. With its characteristic glass façade and saw-tooth roof, it was built as a carpenters' workshop in 1877–78. In the years leading up to the closure of the Arsenal in 1994, much of the building was in use as Customs and Excise stores; from 2001-2016 it housed the Cold War exhibits of Firepower: The Royal Artillery Museum. From 2019–21 the entire complex was renovated and appropriated for use as a performing arts and exhibition venue, and renamed The Fireworks Factory.

=== Cartridge Factory ===
Building 17 dates from 1856: it is a two-storey, iron-framed block with two-colour brick walls. The cast-iron columns made by Benjamin Hick & Son of Bolton, are a feature in the interior, which is said to be of 'considerable structural interest' as an early example of iron framing. It was originally built for the manufacture of paper cartridges. From 2001-2016 it served as the main gallery space for Firepower: The Royal Artillery Museum.

=== Laboratory ===
Building 18, originally the Royal Laboratory Offices, stands to the north of the Cartridge Factory and dates from the same period (though designed in a more classical style with a pilastered stone porch and a pediment). It was enlarged considerably between 1869 and 1877. Inside it retains original staircases. The building was converted in 1999–2000 to accommodate the Royal Artillery Institution Library, later renamed James Clavell Library, after its main sponsor.

Buildings 17 and 18 were built as part of the Royal Laboratory within the Arsenal, which controlled the manufacture of ammunition. A modern infill of 1999–2000 connects the two buildings (it was built to provide an entrance and exhibition space for Firepower: The Royal Artillery Museum). The buildings have not yet been fully integrated in the Woolwich Works project. In 2021 immersive theatre company Punchdrunk took a temporary lease of the buildings. Future plans will see the construction of a 450-seat black box theatre in the modern structure and the return of the Greenwich Heritage Centre to Building 18.

=== Carriageworks ===
Building 19 was originally known as 'the mounting ground' – it was at this site north of the Royal Carriage Factory that guns were placed on their carriages. In the early 1860s the site was covered with an iron-framed and corrugated-sheet clad structure, which was replaced with the present larger and more durable building in 1887. It consists of three parallel sheds, of which the northernmost is shorter. The brick walls contain round-headed windows in relieving arches between pilaster strips. In the interior, tall cast-iron columns and beams for gantry cranes remain. In the early twenty-first century the building was used as a works depot for Berkeley Homes's projects on adjacent sites. In 2021 Punchdrunk moved in and the venue was renamed The Carriageworks. The main entrances are on Cartridge Place (studios) and Carriage Street (offices).

== Gallery ==
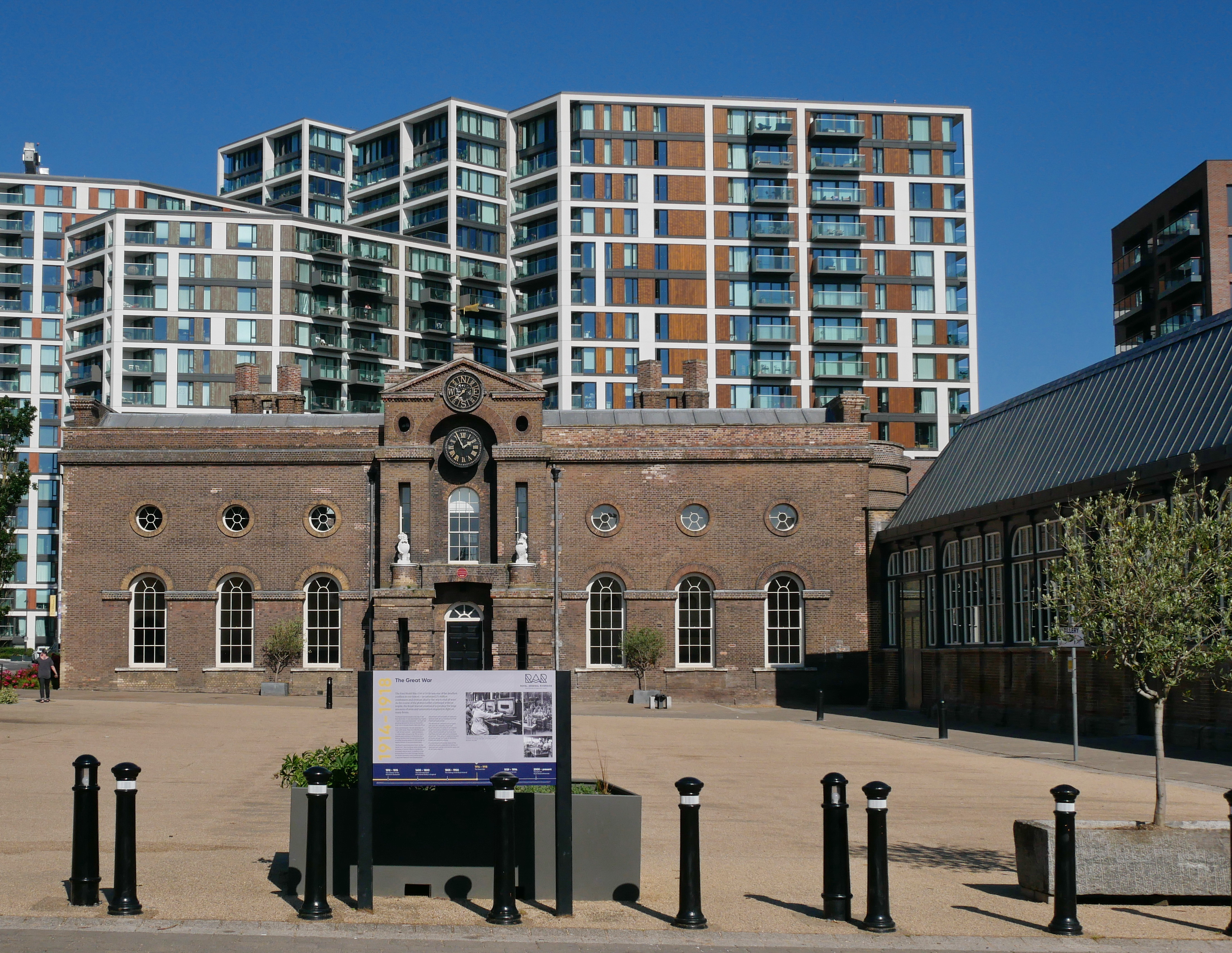
East façade Academy and section of Fireworks Factory

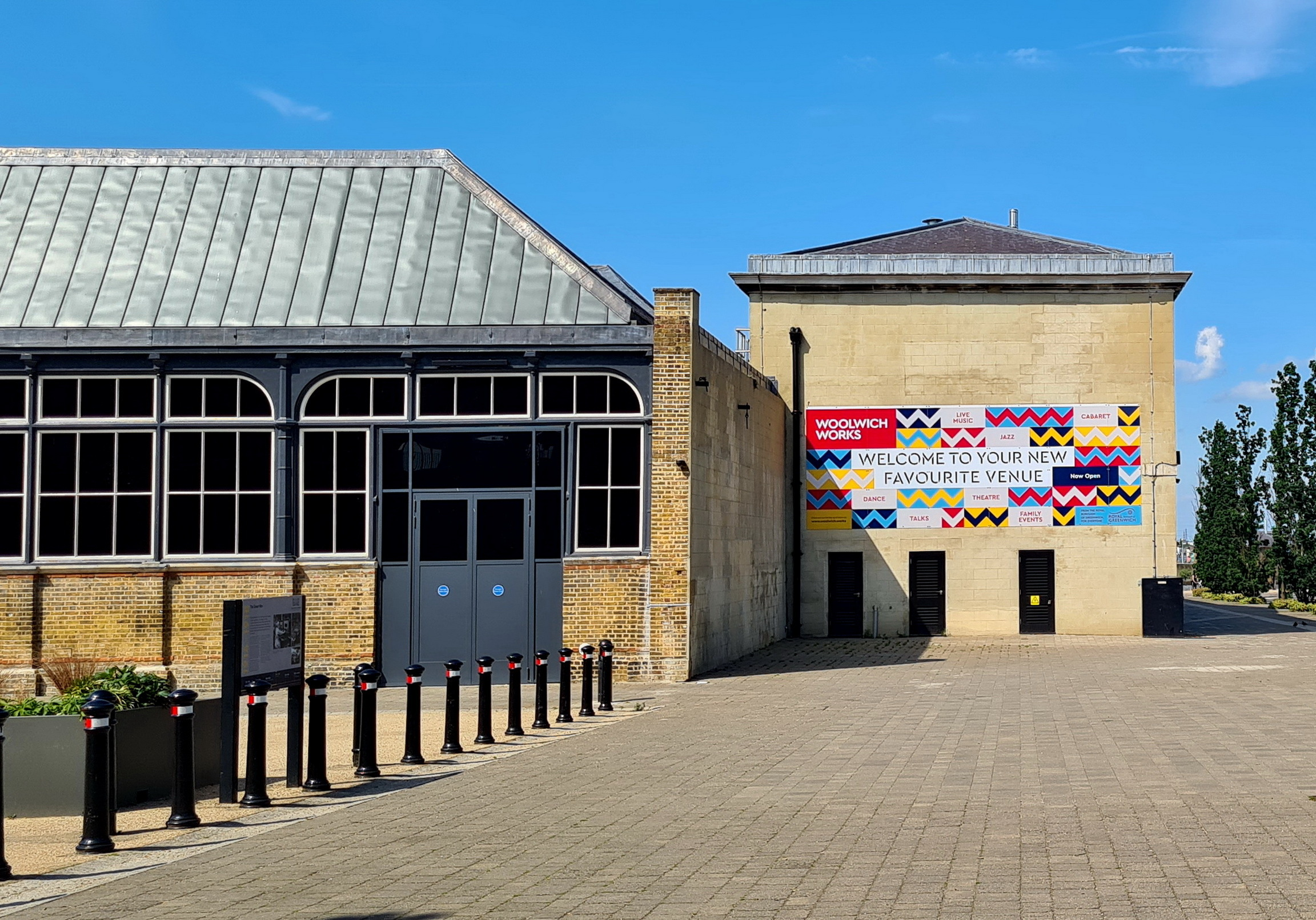
South-east corner of the quadrangle

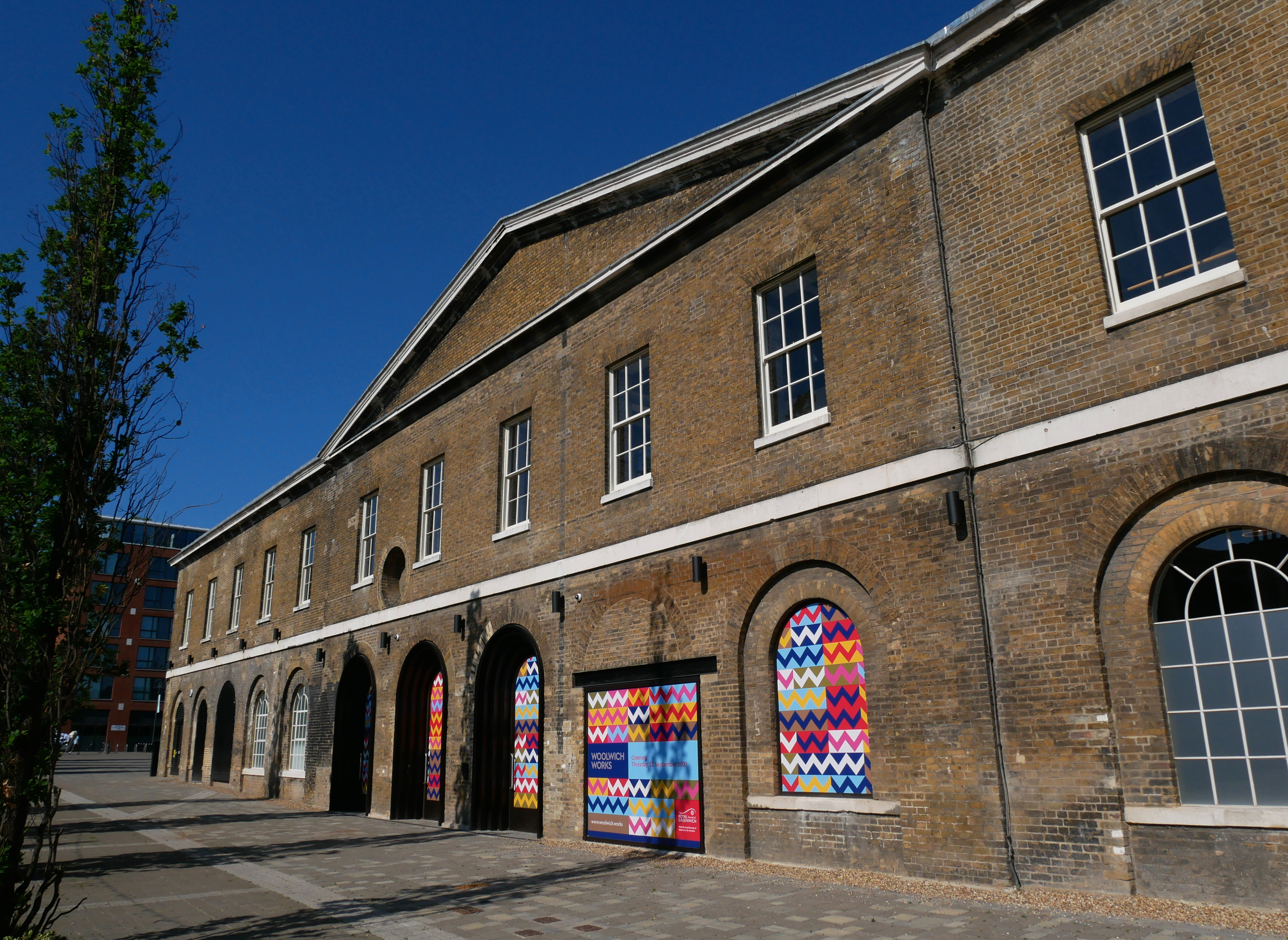
East range and main entrance

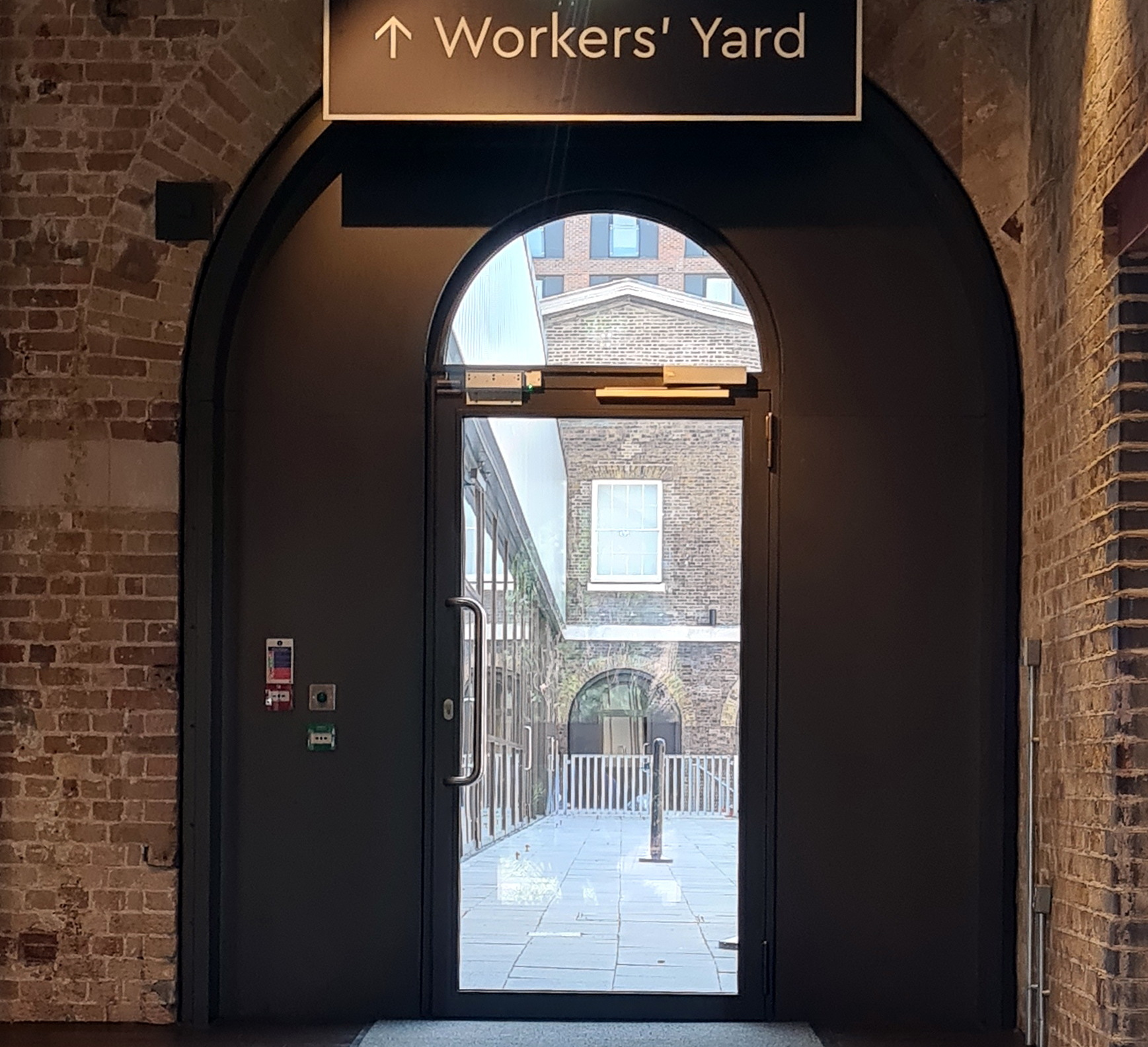
View towards Workers' Yard

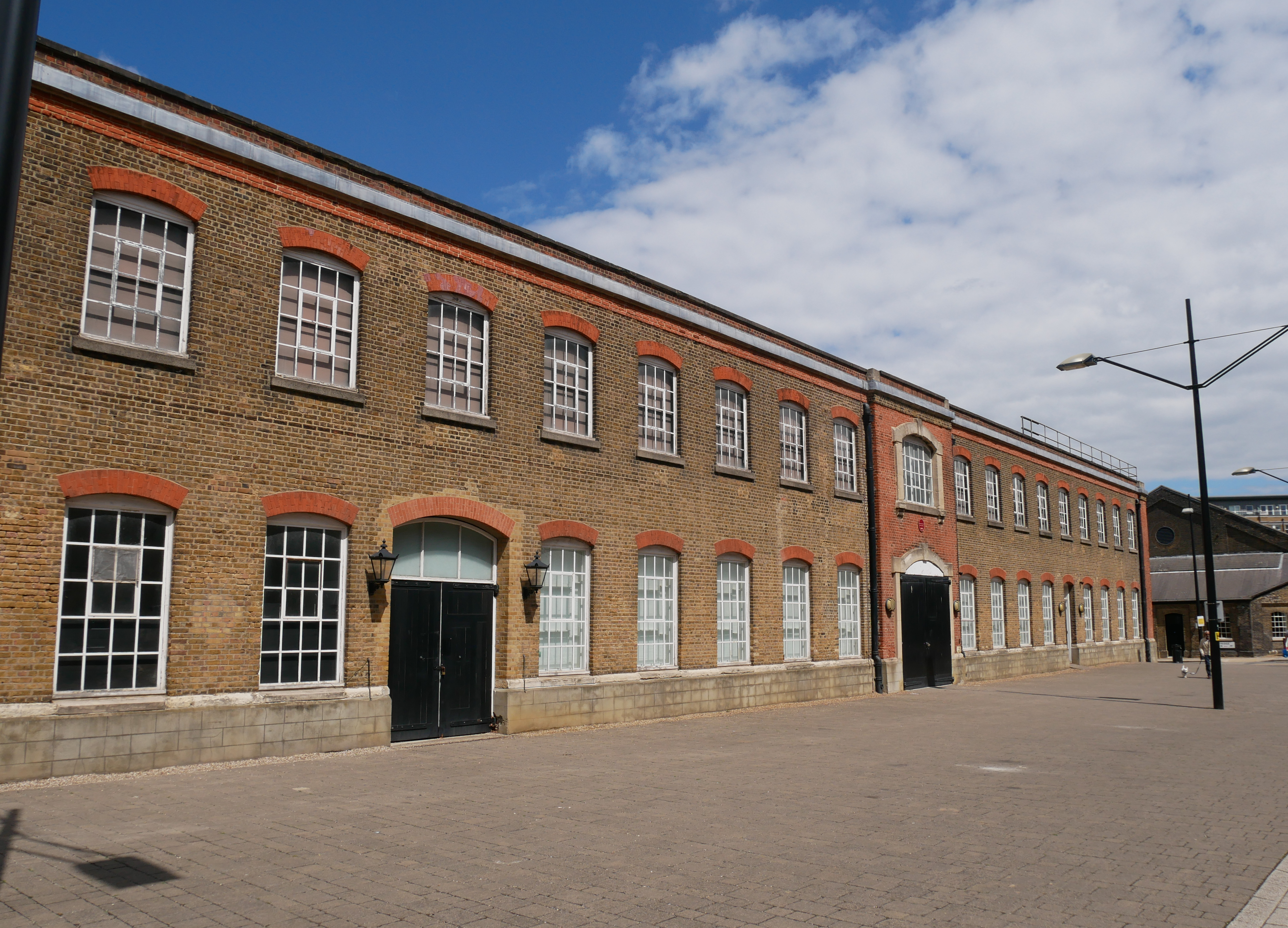
Building 17, south façade

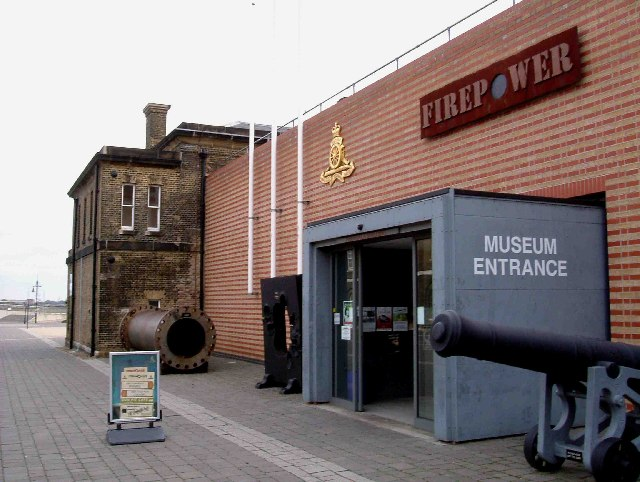
Former Firepower museum entrance

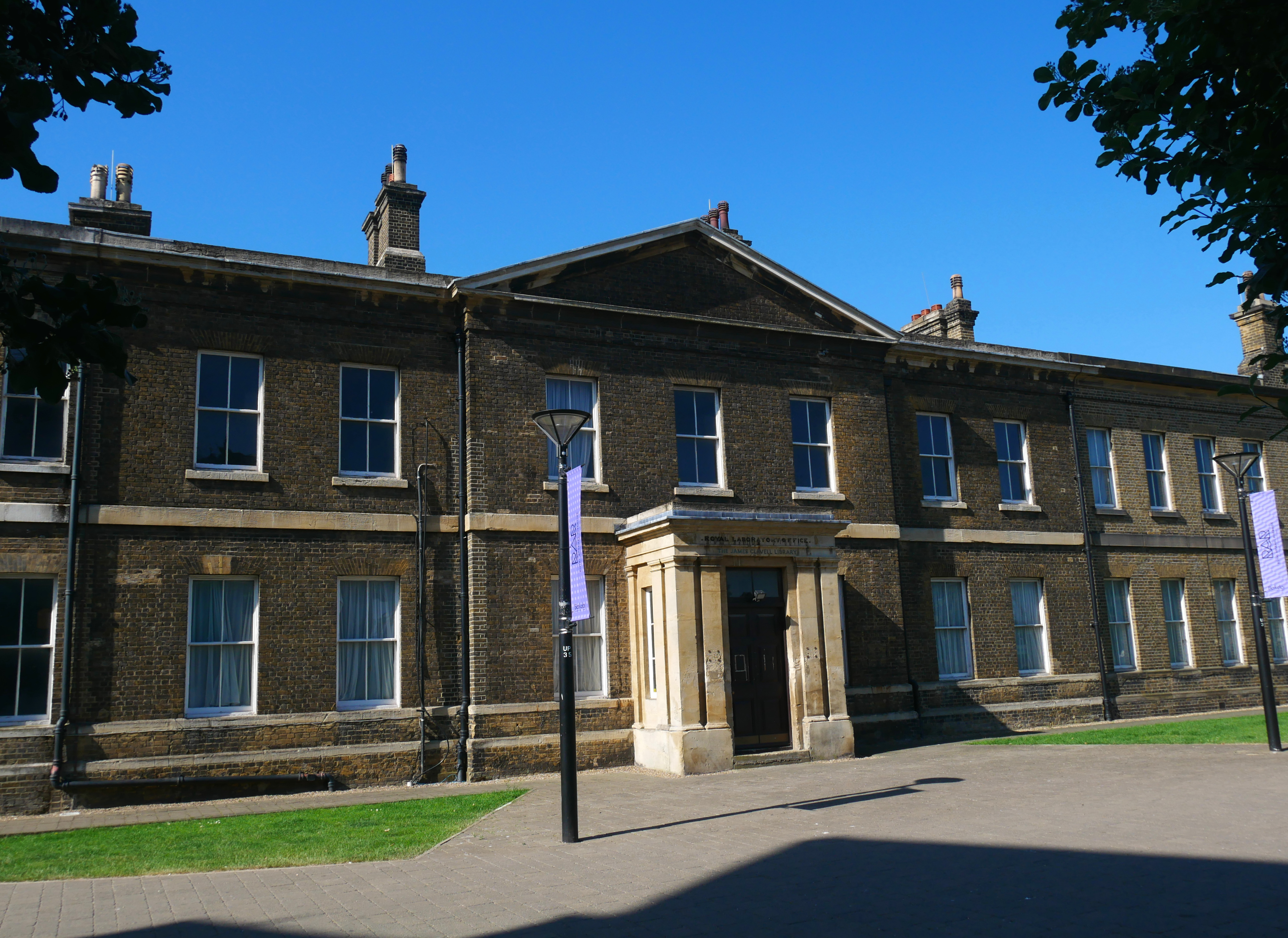
Building 18, north façade

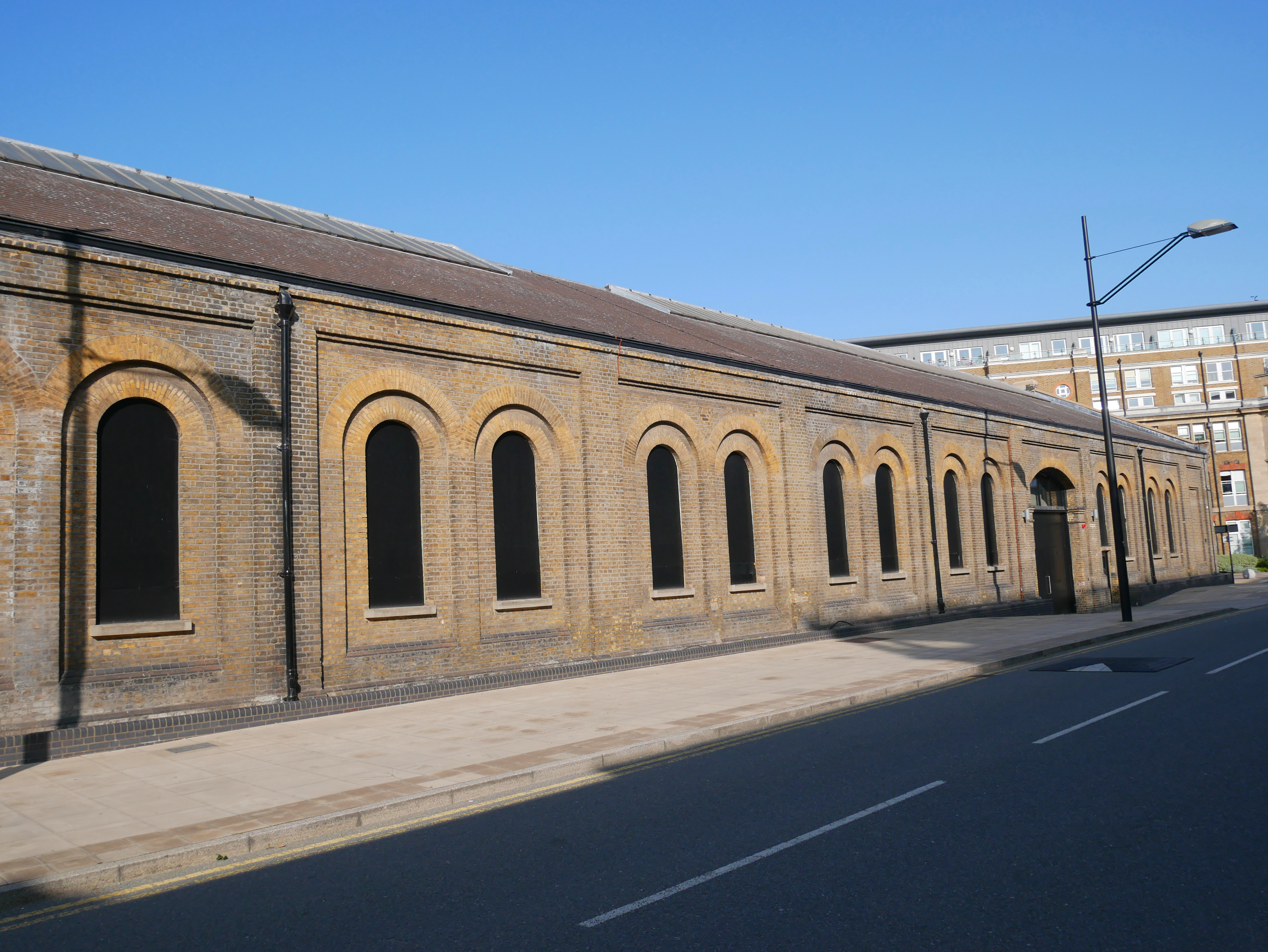
Building 19, south façade
