= King George V DLR station =

Docklands Light Railway station

King George V
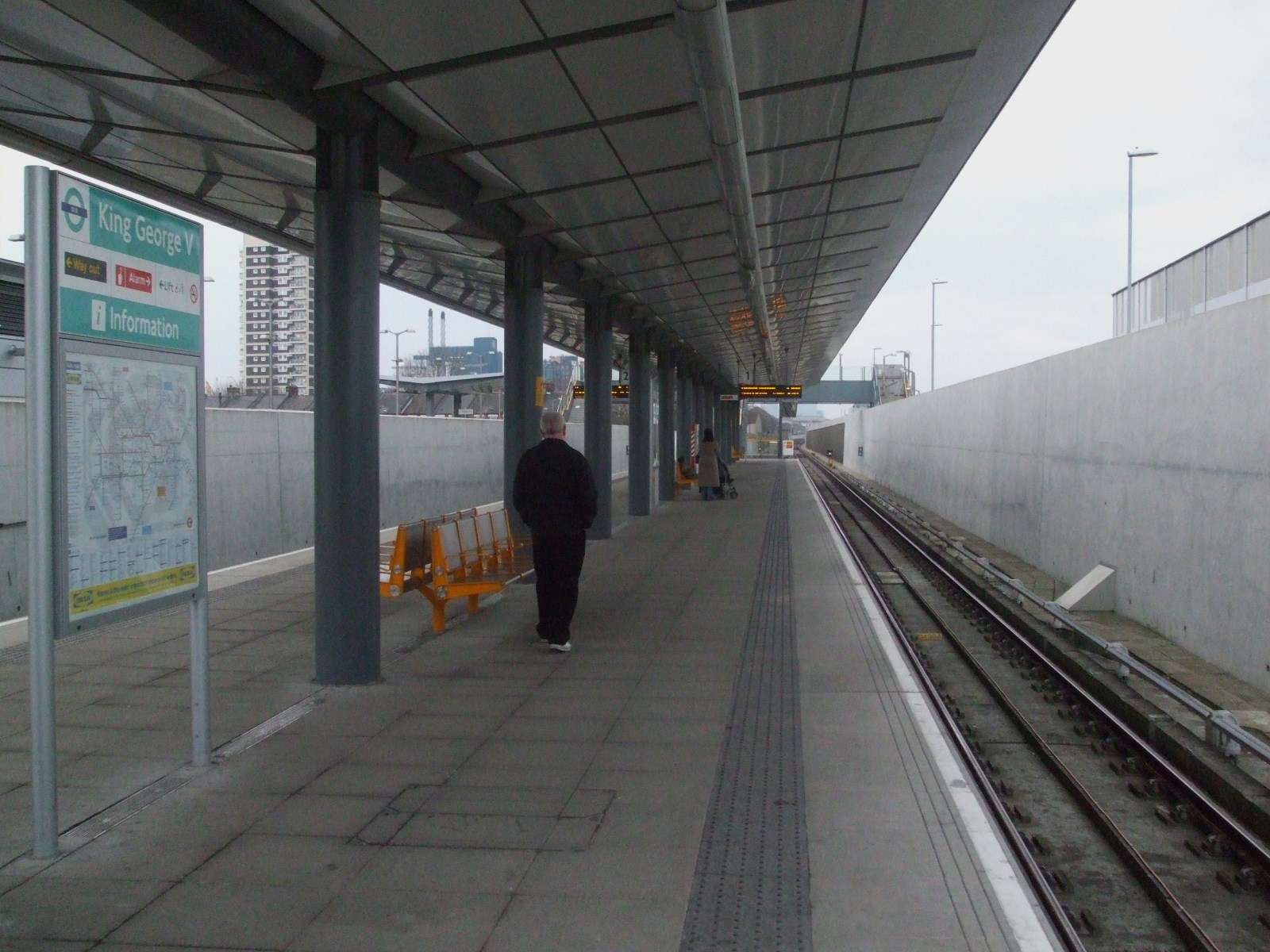
- Looking west along island platform

General information
- Location: North Woolwich, Newham
- Coordinates: 51.501972°N 0.062778°E
- Owned by: Transport for London
- Managed by: Docklands Light Railway
- Platforms: 2

Construction
- Structure type: At-grade
- Accessible: Yes

Other information
- Status: Unstaffed
- Fare zone: 3
- Website: Edit this at Wikidata

History
- Opened: 2 December 2005

Passengers

DLR annual entry and exit
- 2020: ▼1.402 million
- 2021: ▼1.238 million
- 2022: ▲1.620 million
- 2023: ▼1.590 million
- 2024: ▼1.46 million
Location
- Location in Newham

King George V is a Docklands Light Railway (DLR) station in North Woolwich, East London, which opened on 2 December 2005. The station replaced North Woolwich railway station on the North London line and is named after King George V Dock nearby in the London Borough of Newham. King George V is in London fare zone 3. Station and on-train announcements refer to the name in its only said form: 'King George the Fifth'.

== History ==
The station opened on 2 December 2005. Until January 2009, it served as a temporary terminus for the King George V branch of DLR, but the line has since been extended through a tunnel under the River Thames to its new terminus, Woolwich Arsenal.

On 5 January 2021, a woman was injured in a serious incident at the station.

== Location ==
The station is at the northern end of Pier Road in North Woolwich, and is within walking distance of the Woolwich Ferry.

== Services ==
The typical off-peak service in trains per hour from King George V is:

- 6 tph to Stratford International
- 6 tph to Bank
- 12 tph to Woolwich Arsenal

Additional services call at the station during the peak hours, increasing the service to up to 16 tph in each direction, with up to 8 tph to Bank and Stratford International.

Preceding station	DLR	Following station
London City Airport towards Bank or Stratford International	Docklands Light Railway	Woolwich Arsenal Terminus
