= Nick Derbyshire (architect) =

British railway architect

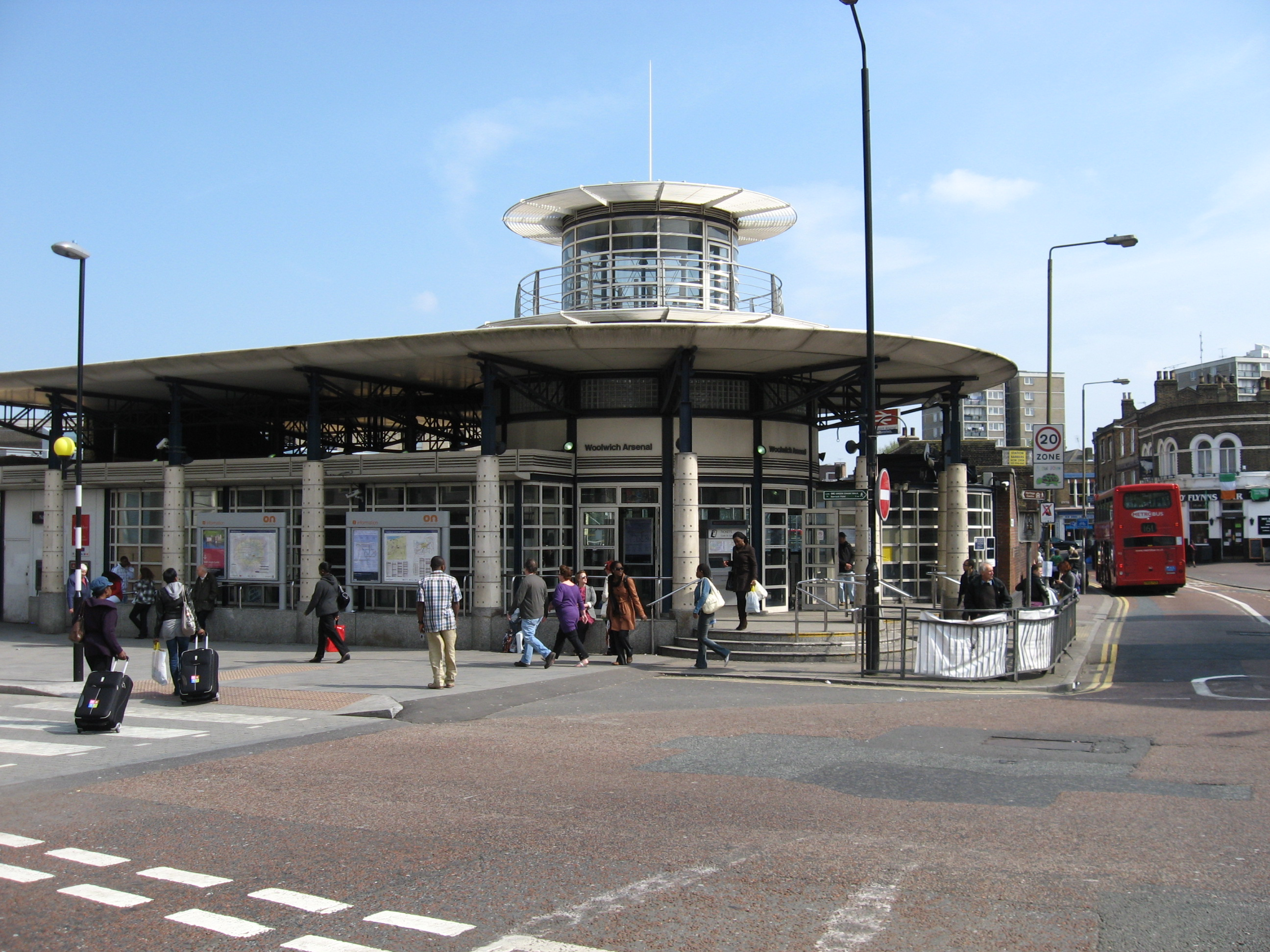
Woolwich Arsenal railway station

Nick Derbyshire (20 July 1944 – 21 August 2016) was the last chief architect for British Rail.

== Career ==
He joined the architects' office of the Eastern Region of British Railways in York in 1970. In 1991 he was appointed Chief Architect for British Rail, leading the Architecture and Design Group, which was a stand-alone company under the control of British Rail. In 1994 he took it over from British Rail as Nick Derbyshire Design Associates, but left in 1997 and set up his own firm, Nick Derbyshire Architects.

== Works ==
- Newcastle railway station travel centre 1985
- Waterloo International railway station Eurostar extension
- London Liverpool Street railway station redevelopment 1991
- Woolwich Arsenal railway station 1992–93
- Ashford International railway station 1995
- Earl's Court tube station refurbishment 1998
