= University of East London Stratford Campus =

University House
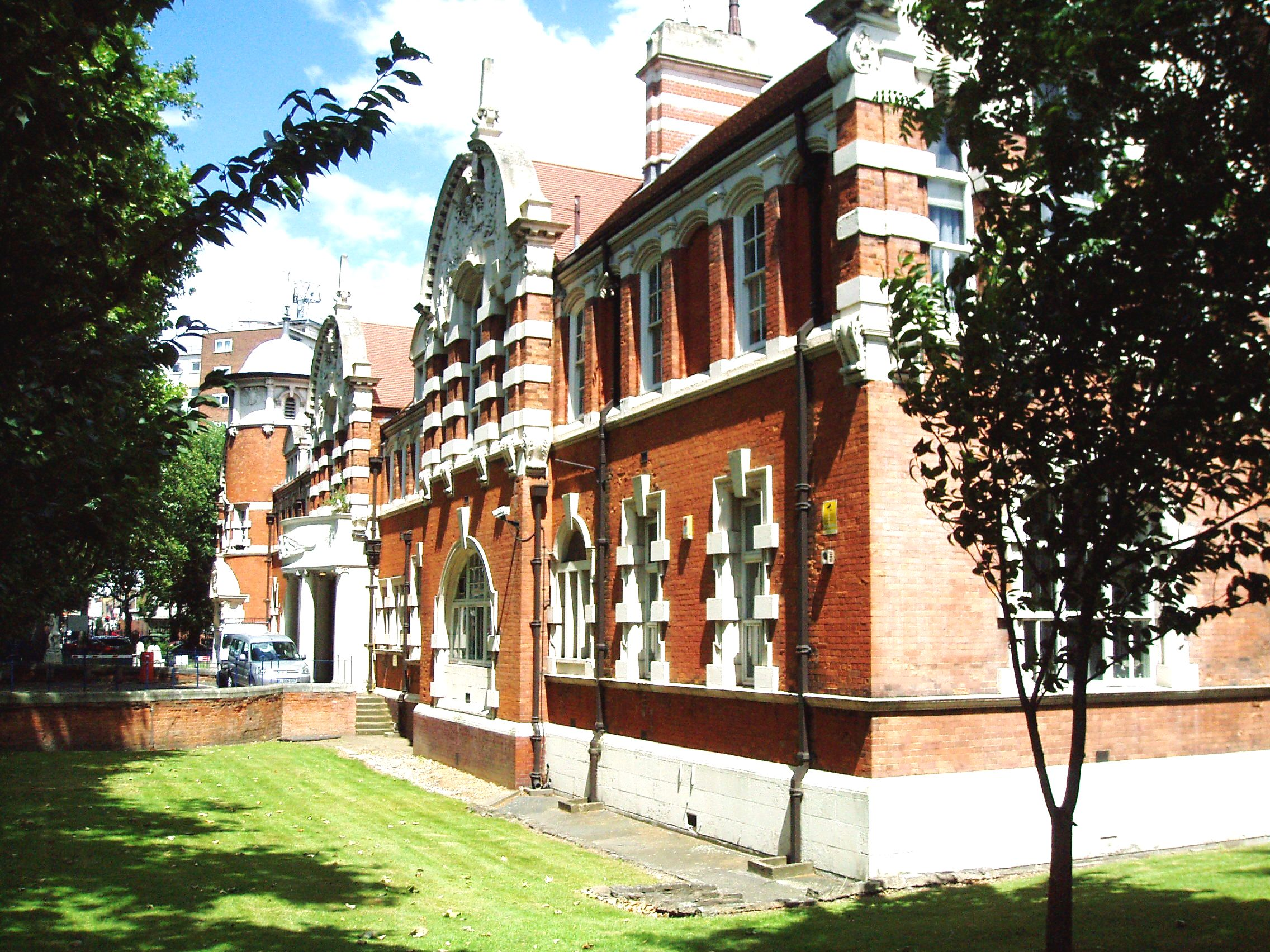
- The Grade II* listed building today, now the University of East London Stratford Campus
- Interactive map of the University House area
- Former names: West Ham Technical Institute

General information
- Type: College
- Architectural style: Renaissance Revival
- Location: Stratford, London Borough of Newham, England
- Coordinates: 51°32′36.29″N 0°0′34.61″E
- Construction started: 29 October 1898
- Opened: 1900
- Cost: £45,000
- Client: West Ham Council
- Owner: University of East London

Technical details
- Structural system: Brick

Design and construction
- Architecture firm: Gibson and Russell
- Main contractor: W.B. Rhind
- Designations: Grade II* listed

Website
- UEL Stratford campus

The University of East London Stratford Campus is based in and around University House, a Grade II* listed building, located in Stratford, London in the London Borough of Newham. The nearest station is Maryland.

== History ==
=== West Ham Technical Institute ===
In 1892 the newly formed Borough of West Ham decided to establish a technical institute to serve the local community. Construction started on 29 October 1898, costing £45,000 to build and £15,000 to equip. Designed by James Glen Sivewright Gibson and Samuel Bridgman Russell in the Renaissance Revival architecture style, with added carving introduced by the foreman of construction Scottish sculptor W.B. Rhind (1853 - 1933). The frontage towards Romford Road shows figures representing Fine art and science; towards Water Lane are figures symbolical of Literature, Engineering, and Music; two female figures adorn the main entrance, and there are four figures in the niches of the square tower representing Perseverance and Industry. When complete, the building was considered one of the finest in that style, and appeared in various architecture journals of the time.

The institute was to be a "people's university" in the words of John Passmore Edwards, speaking at the building's opening ceremony in 1900 - he also opened the local museum, the Passmore Edwards Museum, in a separate building on the same site on the same occasion. Under principal Albert E. Briscoe, the college provided courses in science, engineering and art. In addition, under Maud J. Foster of the L.C.C. Training School, it had a Women's Department. The Institute it established its own internal degree courses in science and engineering, which were ratified by the University of London. Day secretarial courses for girls were added in 1906, a girls Trade School in 1912, a junior engineering school for boys in 1913, and a Junior School of Arts & Crafts in 1914.

It became the West Ham Municipal college in 1921 and latterly, West Ham College of Technology.

As demand for technical education grew throughout the 1930s and 1940s, the county council created two further colleges at Walthamstow and Dagenham.

=== North East London Polytechnic ===
In 1970, these three colleges (West Ham, Walthamstow, Dagenham) were combined as a merger of higher education colleges to create the North East London Polytechnic. Campuses were modernised and revitalised by buildings such as the Arthur Edwards building on the Stratford campus, completed in 1982. In 1988, the North East London Polytechnic became a Higher Education Institution, renamed the Polytechnic of East London in 1989.

=== University of East London ===
In 1992, the Polytechnic of East London became the University of East London. A "new university", the UEL's history of founding institutions exemplify the developments that took place in British further and higher education policy throughout the late nineteenth and twentieth centuries. The University of East London consisted of the Barking Campus (closed 2006) and the Stratford Campus.

In 1999 the University of East London Docklands Campus was opened, the first new university campus built in London for over 50 years.

== Present: Stratford Campus ==
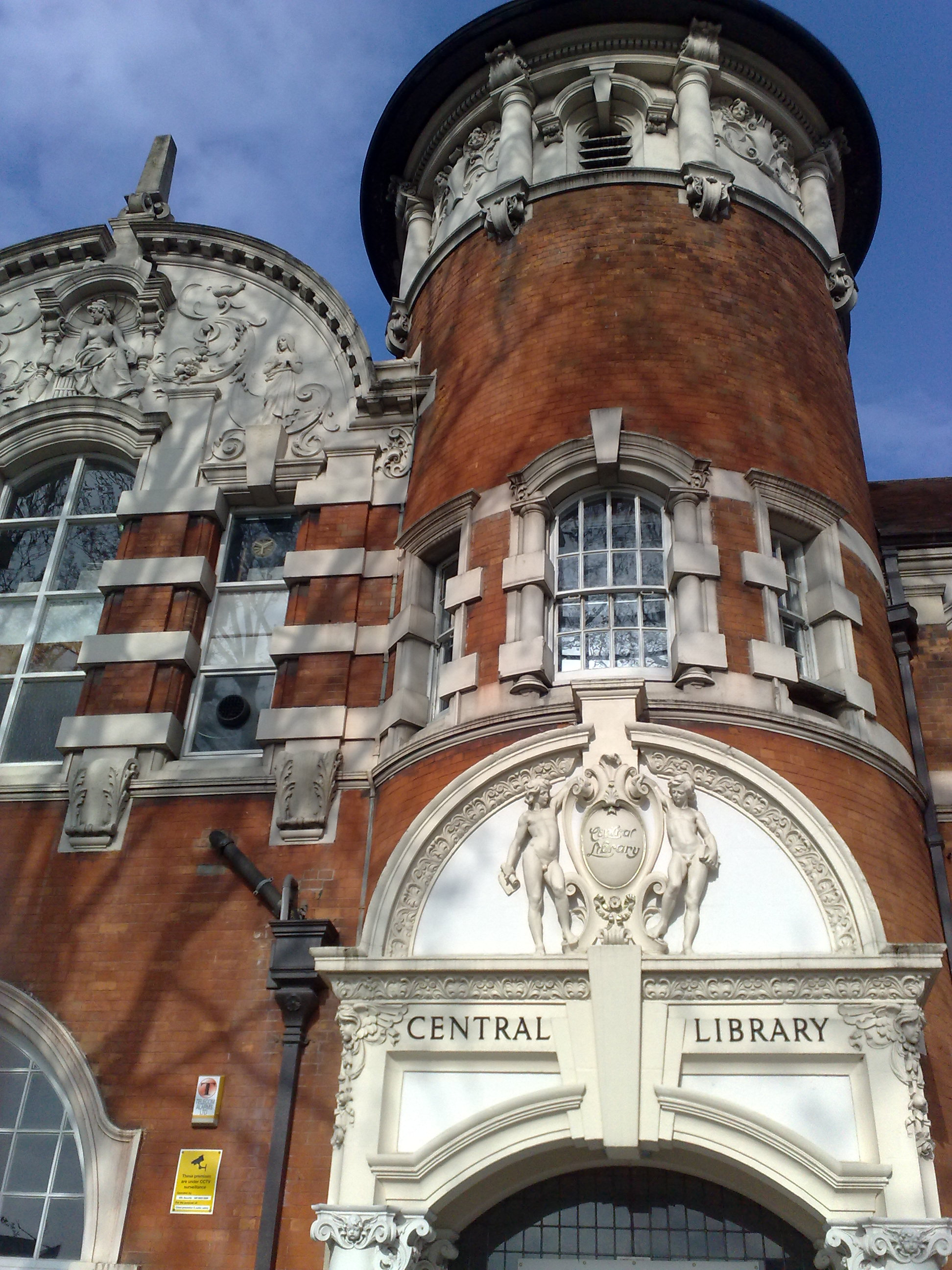
Details around the entrance to the library of the University of East London Stratford Campus

The present Stratford campus of the University of East London is centred on the now Grade II* listed University House.

The campus is home to the School of Education and Communities, the Schools of Health Sport & Bioscience and the School of Psychology. The Centre for Clinical Education was opened in January 2008. Operating in partnership with the National Health Service, the centre is London's only provider of podiatric education.

Duncan House is near to the campus. It is used by the university's human resource services and by the School of Law and Social Sciences. It contains a library servicing the needs of those who attend the building.

=== Developments ===
In 2013, the School of Law and Social Sciences and the Institute of Performing Arts have moved to a new campus, University Square Stratford, located in Stratford's Cultural Quarter. The building is also shared with Birkbeck College, University of London. Building began on site in July 2011 and is scheduled for completion in summer 2013, with the first students admitted for the academic year 2013/14.

In 2011 UEL appointed Make Architects to lead on the design of a new, replacement library at the Stratford Campus. The project has a budget of £13 million and a target opening date of 2013. It opened in September 2013.
