= Woolwich railway station =

Railway station in London, England

Woolwich
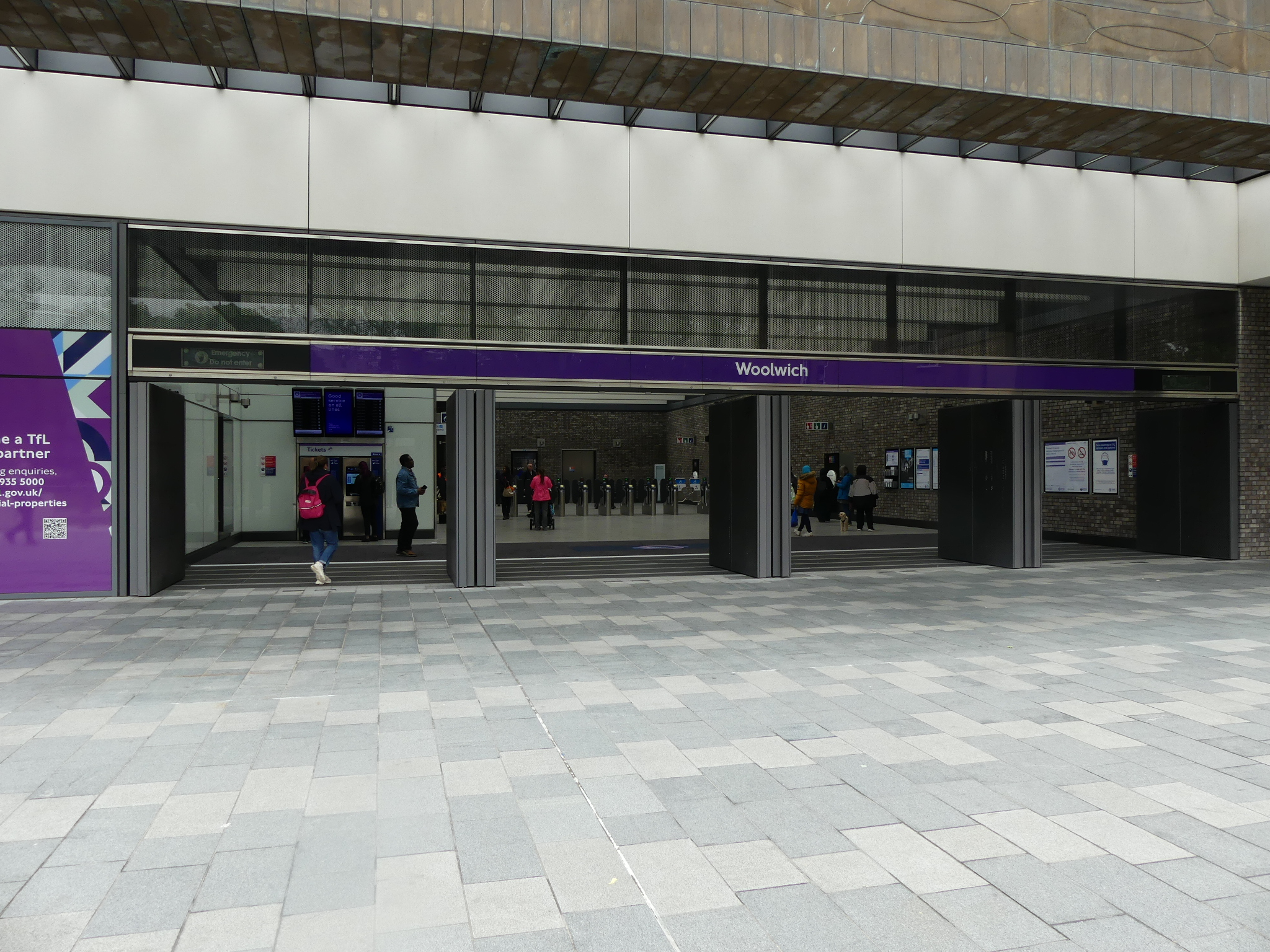
- Station entrance seen in May 2022
- Interactive map of Woolwich

General information
- Location: Woolwich
- Local authority: Royal Borough of Greenwich
- Managed by: Elizabeth line
- Owner: Transport for London
- Station code: WWC
- Number of platforms: 2
- Fare zone: 4
- OSI: Woolwich Arsenal

National Rail annual entry and exit
- 2022–23: 8.340 million
- 2023–24: ▲13.237 million
- 2024–25: ▲13.756 million

Key dates
- 24 May 2022: Opening

Other information
- External links: Departures; Facilities
- Coordinates: 51.491578°N 0.071819°E

Woolwich railway station is an Elizabeth line station in Woolwich in London, England which opened on 24 May 2022, and has up to 12 trains per hour to Canary Wharf and Central London. It is in London fare zone 4.

This station received almost 9 million passengers in the first year of its opening.

== History ==
Woolwich railway station (not to be confused with the similarly named Woolwich Arsenal or Woolwich Dockyard stations) was built as part of the Crossrail rail project to provide infrastructure for the Elizabeth line. Crossrail was jointly sponsored by the Department for Transport (DfT) and Transport for London (TfL). The construction of a station at Woolwich was not proposed as part of the original Crossrail route. However, after talks between Greenwich London Borough Council and developer Berkeley Homes about the £162 million required for the station, the House of Commons Select Committee recognised its inclusion in March 2007.

=== Construction ===
In May 2021, Crossrail said that Woolwich station had recently entered the T-12 process, meaning that the station was considered to be 12 weeks away from handover to TfL. Reaching this milestone meant that work was now focused on testing and commissioning systems, and the contractor began demobilising staff across the site. The station was officially handed over to TfL on 25 June 2021, and opened along with the rest of the Elizabeth line from Paddington to Abbey Wood on 24 May 2022.

== Site ==
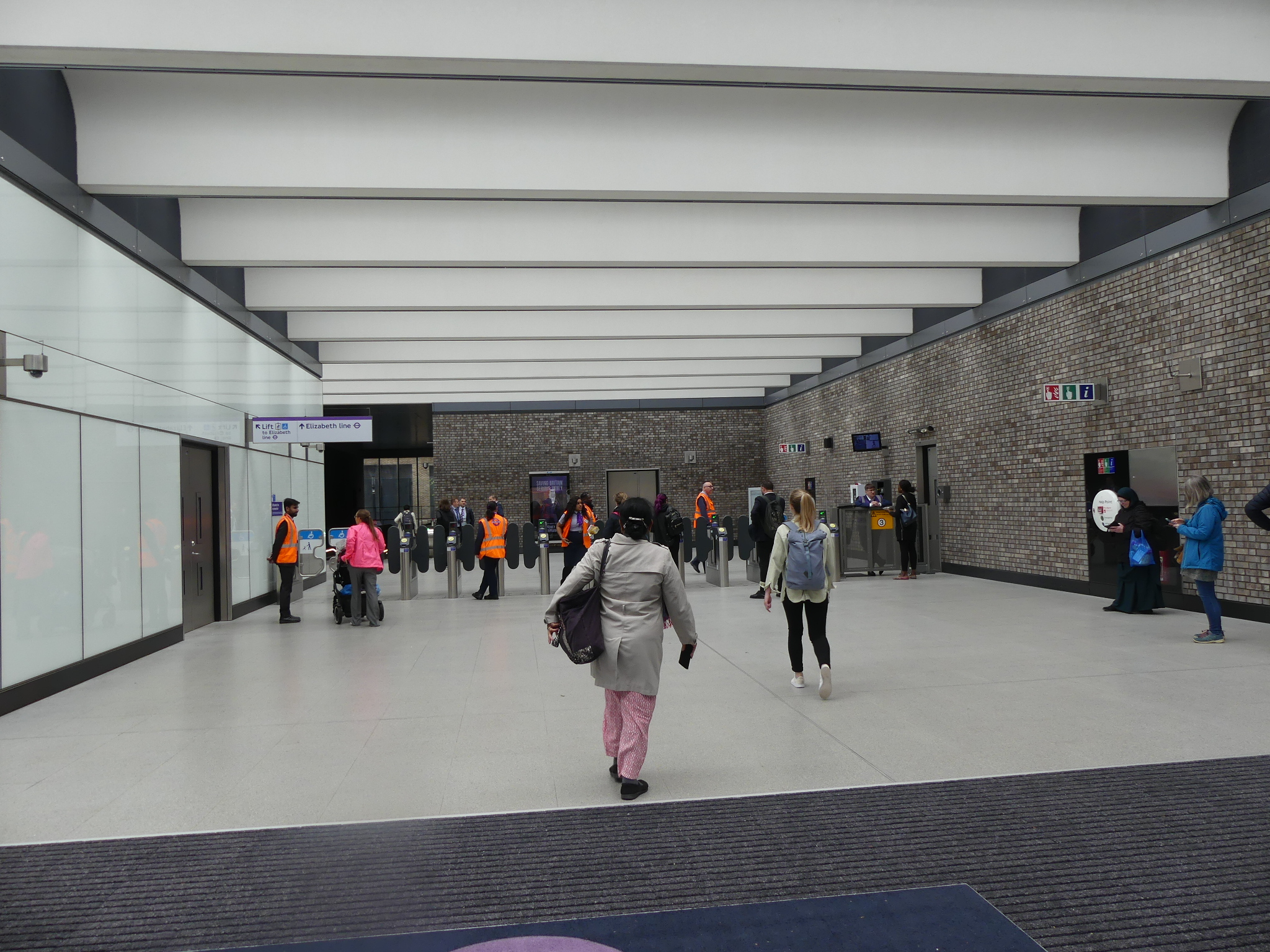
The ticket hall and gateline

The station was built on the southeast portion of the Elizabeth line that ends at Abbey Wood, and is the penultimate station on this branch. The Woolwich redevelopment site at Royal Arsenal is a modern waterside housing and retail development area adjacent to the station. It is spread across approximately 30 hectares (75 acres) of land and is being developed by Berkeley Homes.

The site was developed with the construction of approximately 2,517 new homes, in addition to the 1,248 homes already built. The area is also to include a new cultural quarter known as Woolwich Works, as well as infrastructural developments such as retail stores, restaurants and cafes, offices, hotels and a cinema.

== Design ==
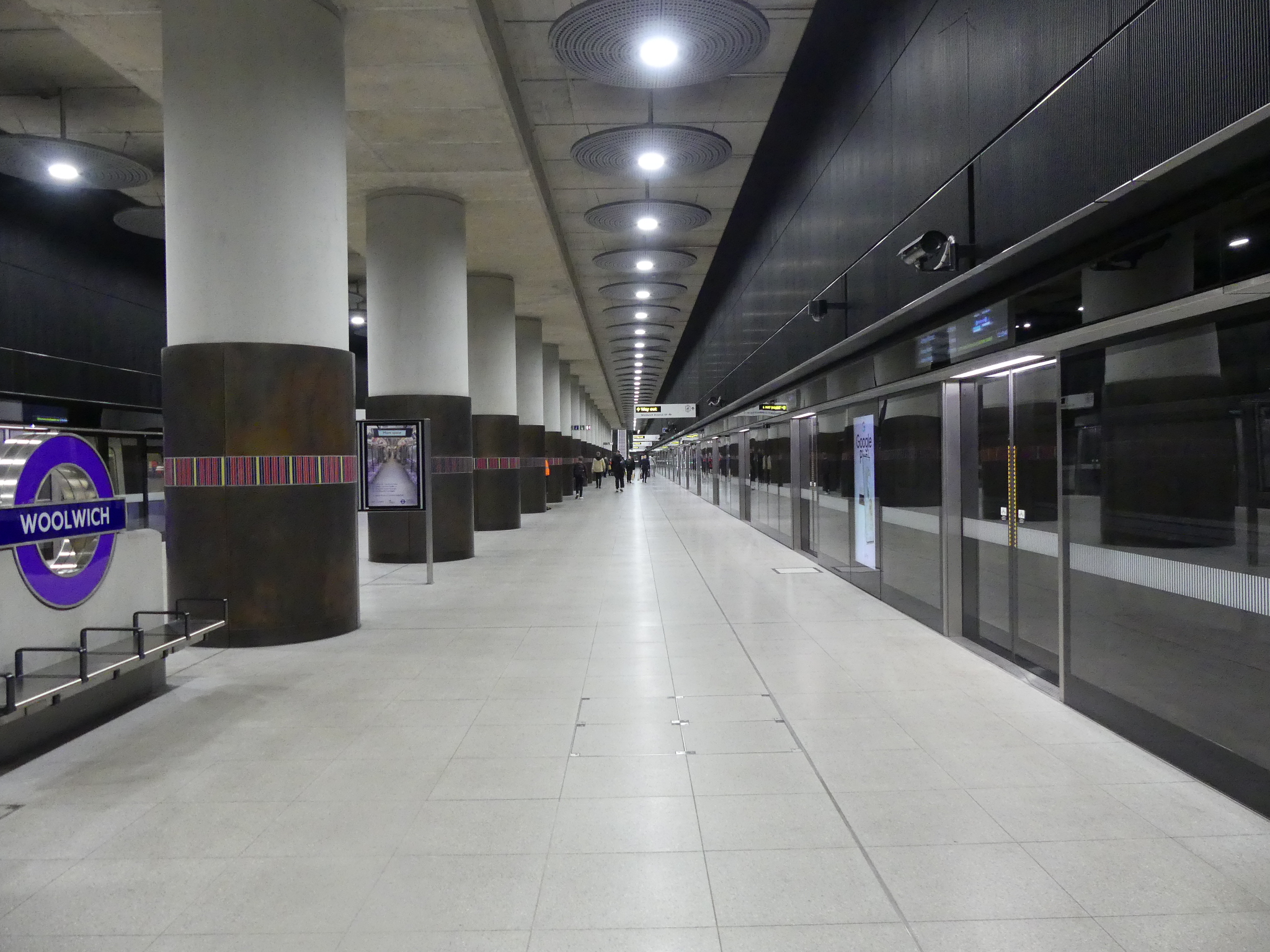
Woolwich station platform

The station box is 276 m (906 ft) long and 14 m (46 ft) below ground, and sits below a major housing development site. The station was built by Balfour Beatty after a design by Weston Williamson, Mott MacDonald and Arup Group (engineering). The station entrance in Dial Arch Square features a 30-metre wide (98 ft) bronze-clad portal. Natural light will enter through the main entrance and ceiling into the ticket hall, whilst a connection to daylight is present below ground on the platforms.

Set back from the main street and surrounded by a series of heritage listed buildings and a large retail unit, the station acts as a simple portal connecting all these elements together. The station entrance opens out on to Dial Arch Square, a green space, flanked by a series of Grade I and II listed buildings. In addition to enhancing the experience in and out of the station, the urban realm design also helps connect the station with the wider town centre. In addition to the station improvements, Crossrail has been working with the Royal Borough of Greenwich on proposals for improvements to the area around the station.

The station was awarded a Civic Trust Award in 2023.

== Services ==
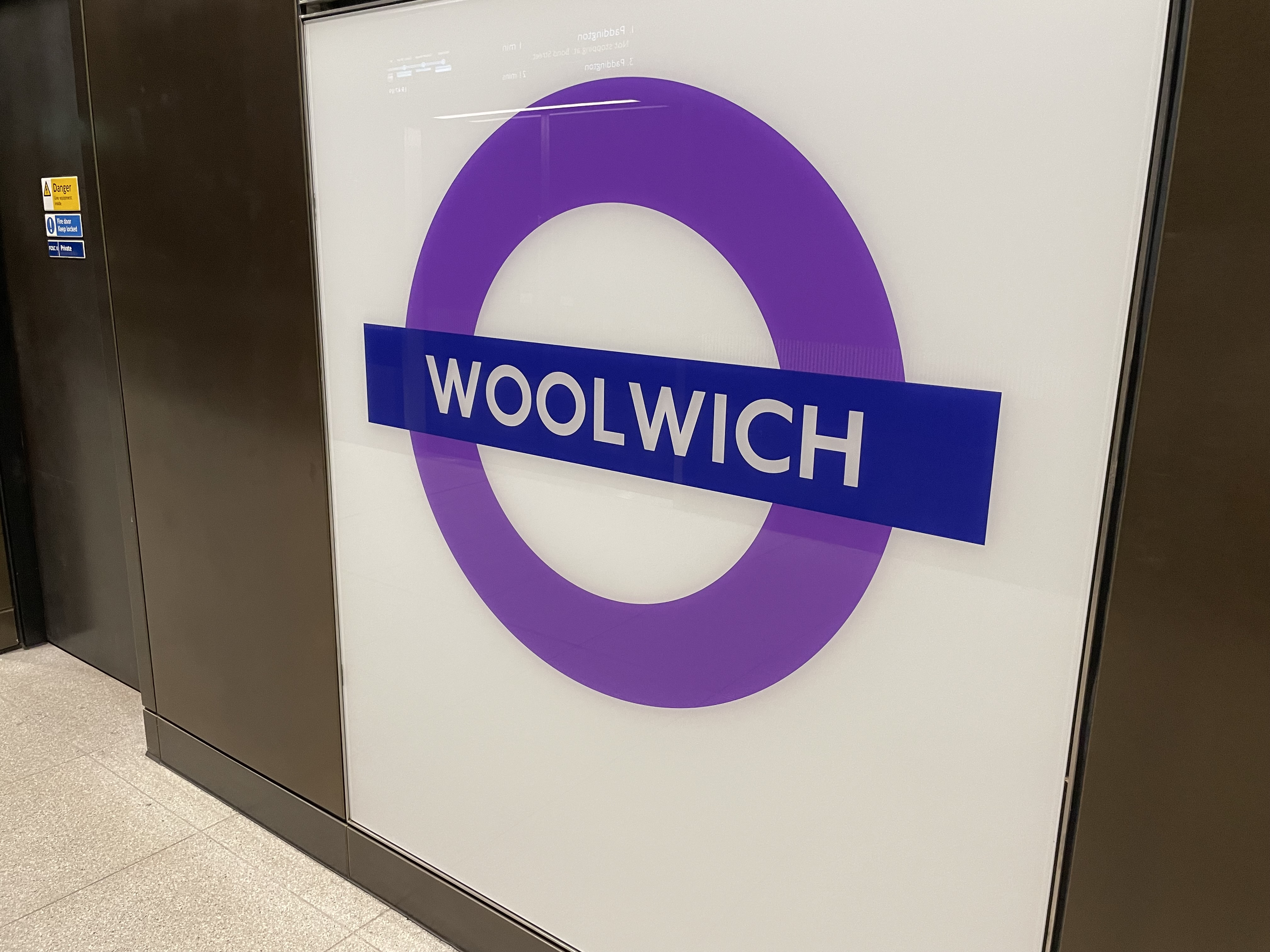
Woolwich station TfL roundel

All services at Woolwich are operated by the Elizabeth line using Class 345 EMUs.

The typical off-peak service in trains per hour is:

- 8 tph to Abbey Wood
- 4 tph to Maidenhead of which 2 continue to Reading
- 4 tph to Heathrow Terminal 4

Additional services call at the station during the peak hours, increasing the service to up to 12 tph in each direction.

Preceding station	Elizabeth line	Following station
Custom House towards Reading or Heathrow Terminal 4	Elizabeth line	Abbey Wood Terminus

== Connections ==
The closest existing station is Woolwich Arsenal which has National Rail and Docklands Light Railway services. The stations are separate but within a short walking distance of each other, and have an out-of-station interchange. There are also Thames Clippers river bus services from Woolwich (Royal Arsenal) Pier to central London. London Buses routes 53, 54, 96, 99, 122, 161, 177, 180, 244, 291, 301, 380, 422, 469, Superloop route SL11 and night routes N1, N53 and N472 serve the station.
