= London Borough of Newham Heritage Service =

The London Borough of Newham Heritage Service is a public service run by the London Borough of Newham. It runs the Newham Local Studies and Archives Library in Stratford, London and administers the Newham Photos website and the former collections of the Passmore Edwards Museum and the North Woolwich Old Station Museum, both now closed. Although much of those collections has been transferred to other institutions (such as Godfrey Kneller's 1721 The Harvey Family), the collection run by the service is still substantial and includes significant holdings of Bow porcelain and of artworks by the outsider artist Madge Gill. Some items from the collection are on loan to House Mill.
