= North Woolwich Old Station Museum =

Former railway museum in London, England

Coordinates: 51°29′59″N 0°3′47″E

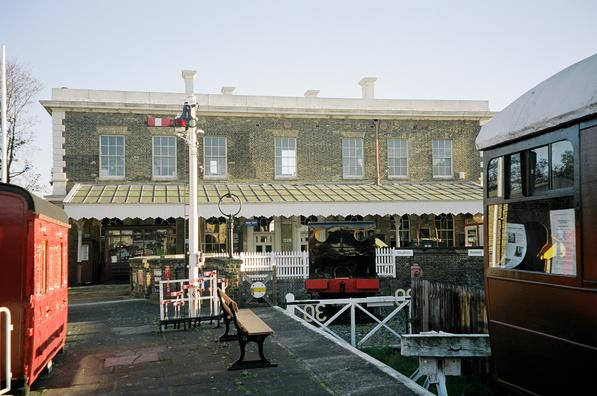
The museum from the rear of the station building

The North Woolwich Old Station Museum was a small railway museum in North Woolwich, in Newham, east London. Located in the former Great Eastern Railway terminal station building at North Woolwich railway station, the museum opened in 1984. It closed in 2008.

== History ==
The station building at North Woolwich was opened in 1847, and was designed by Sir William Tite. The station was bombed during the London Blitz in 1940. The building was in use as a ticket office until 1979 when it was replaced by a more austere building on the one remaining platform. It was derelict for many years until its opening as a museum by the Queen Mother on 20 November 1984. It had been established by the London Borough of Newham and the building owner, the Passmore Edwards Museum Trust.

The line was electrified in 1985 when it became part of the North London line but closed on 9 December 2006, following the opening of the Docklands Light Railway in the local area.

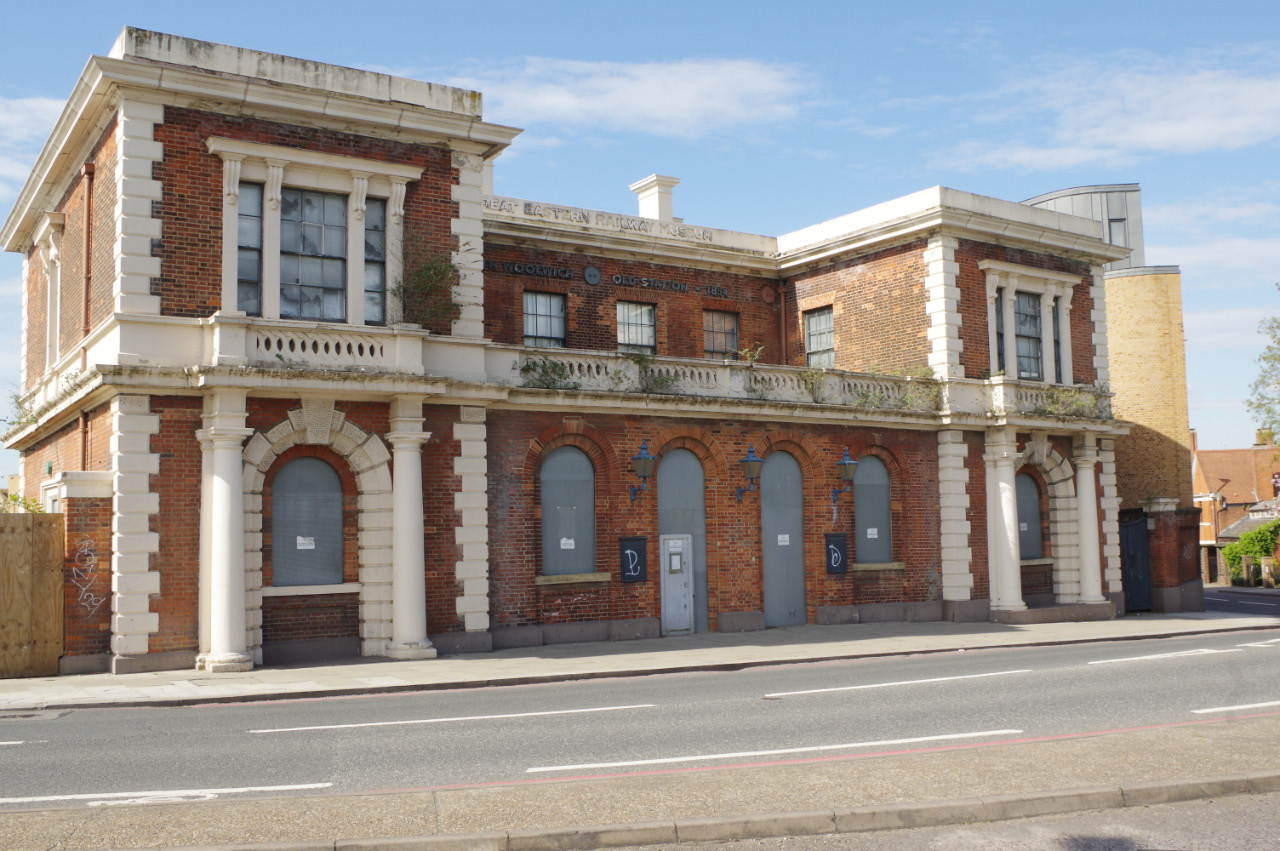
The historic station building in 2017, following the closure of the museum

The collections included historical materials on railways in East London, model trains, and a non-operational steam locomotive. The building was also used for some local community functions. The station building was Grade II-listed in 1998.

=== Closure ===
By 2008, the Borough of Newham was no longer able to finance the Museum. Its closure was finalised in November 2008. By 2011 all externally visible displays including the rolling stock and signage had been removed. Most loans were returned to their private lenders, with other items dispersed to the East Anglian Railway Museum, Mangapps Railway Museum and the Great Eastern Railway Society and some items retained by Newham Heritage Service, also heir to the collections of the Passmore Edwards Museum.

The building has been disused since. It remains owned by the River Lea Tidal Mill Trust (now House Mill Trust). It was put up for sale in 2020.

== Locomotives formerly stored ==
Type	Factory	Gauge	Works No.	Class	Built	Now at
Steam	Neilson	0-4-0ST	2119	GER Class 209	1876	Flour Mill, Lydney, Gloucestershire (under overhaul)
Steam	Peckett	0-4-0ST	2000	Peckett	1942	Barrow Hill Engine Shed, Derbyshire
Diesel-mechanical	Planet	4 wheel	3294		1948	Waltham Abbey Royal Gunpowder Mills

== See also ==
- List of railway museums in the United Kingdom
- Heritage railways
  - List of heritage railways in the United Kingdom
- Restored trains
- North Woolwich railway station
