= King George V Dock, London =

Dock in London

King George V Dock
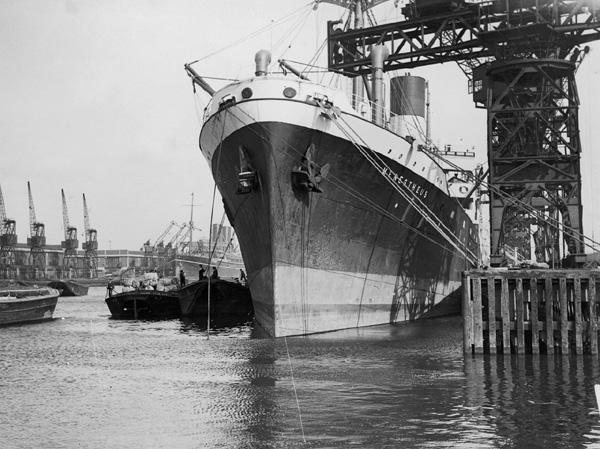
- The Blue Funnel Line cargo liner Menestheus in King George V Dock around 1940

- Location within London Borough of Newham
- 51.5037°N 0.0597°E
- Location: London

History
- Built: 1921

King George V Dock, in the London Borough of Newham, is one of three docks in the Royal Docks of east London, now part of the redeveloped Docklands.

== History ==
Originating with the London and India Docks Company (New Works) Act 1901 (1 Edw. 7. c. ccxxvii), and begun in 1912 by the Port of London Authority, the King George V was the last of London's upstream enclosed docks to be built. After delay by the First World War, construction was completed in 1921. Although at 64 acres (26 ha) of water it was smaller than the other royals, it had its own entrance from the Thames through a lock and bascule bridge. The dock could berth liners as large as the RMS Mauretania. At its western end was a large graving dock (since filled in) and machine shop used for ship repairs by Harland & Wolff. From the 1960s onwards, the King George V Dock experienced a steady decline – as did all of London's other docks – as the shipping industry adopted containerisation, which effectively moved traffic downstream to Tilbury. It finally closed to commercial traffic along with the other Royal Docks in 1981.

Redevelopment in the late 20th century included the construction of London City Airport which was built on the north bank of the dock with a single runway and completed in 1987. King George V station on the London City Airport branch of the Docklands Light Railway, which opened in December 2005, is named after the dock.
