= Woolwich Dockyard railway station =

Railway station in Woolwich, London, England

Woolwich Dockyard
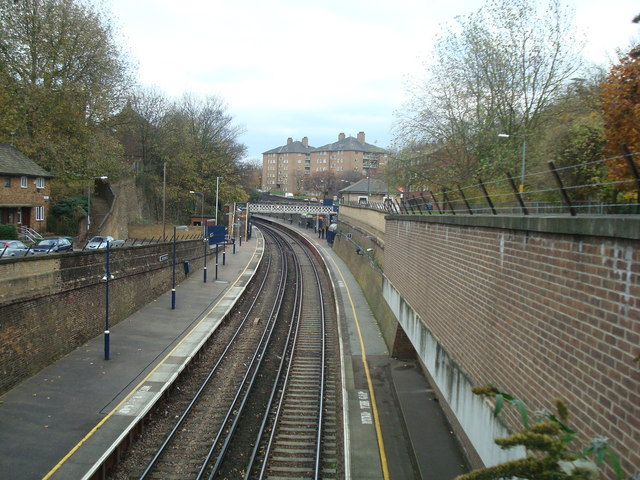
- Interactive map of Woolwich Dockyard

General information
- Location: Woolwich
- Local authority: Royal Borough of Greenwich
- Managed by: Southeastern
- Station code: WWD
- DfT category: E
- Number of platforms: 2
- Fare zone: 3

National Rail annual entry and exit
- 2020–21: ▼0.176 million
- 2021–22: ▲0.376 million
- 2022–23: ▼0.338 million
- 2023–24: ▼0.307 million
- 2024–25: ▲0.315 million

Key dates
- 30 July 1849: Opened

Other information
- External links: Departures; Facilities
- Coordinates: 51.4913°N 0.0536°E

Woolwich Dockyard railway station is in Woolwich in the Royal Borough of Greenwich. It is 8 miles 56 chains (14.0 km) measured from London Charing Cross. The station and all trains serving it are operated by Southeastern. It is in London fare zone 3. It takes its name from the former Woolwich Dockyard.

== Services ==
All services at Woolwich Dockyard are operated by Southeastern using Class 376, 465, 466 and 707 EMUs.

The typical off-peak service in trains per hour is:

- 4 tph to London Cannon Street (2 of these run via Greenwich and 2 run via Lewisham)
- 2 tph to Barnehurst, returning to London Cannon Street via Bexleyheath and Lewisham
- 2 tph to Dartford

Additional services, including trains to and from London Cannon Street via Sidcup call at the station during the peak hours.

Preceding station	National Rail	Following station
Charlton	Southeastern North Kent Line	Woolwich Arsenal

== Connections ==
London Buses routes 161, 177, 180, 380, 472 and night route N1 serve the station.
