= Passmore Edwards Museum =

Former museum in Stratford, east London

Coordinates: 51.5432°N 0.0097°E

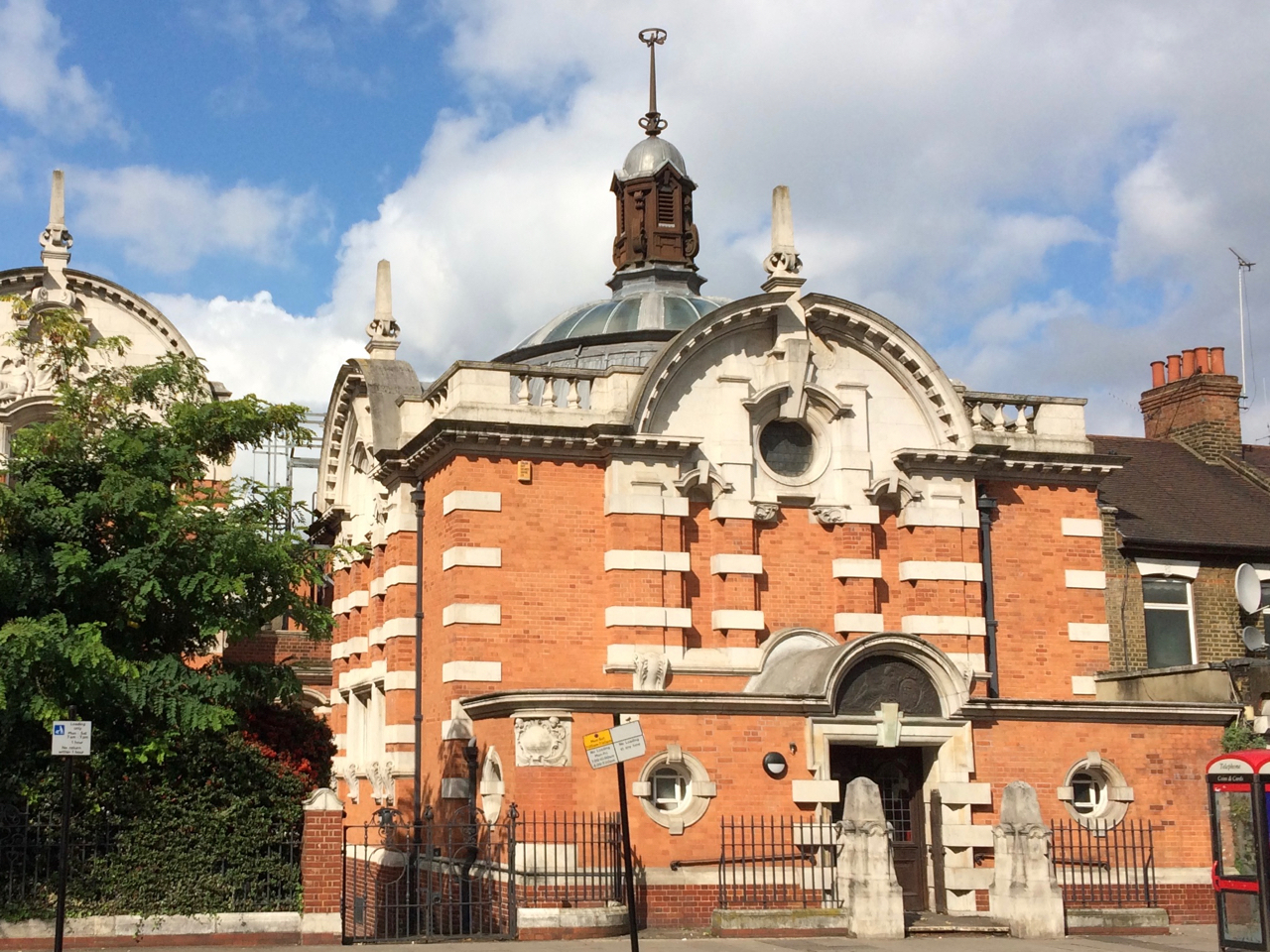
- Established: 18 October 1900
- Dissolved: 1994
- Location: Stratford, east London

The Passmore Edwards Museum was a museum in Stratford, east London. Earlier in its life it was also known as the Essex Local and Educational Museum of Natural History.

It began life as the collection and library of the Essex Field Club, which formed the new museum's nucleus by agreement between the Club and the Corporation of West Ham. In an agreement made between the Corporation of West Ham and the Essex Field Club, dated 25 July 1898, the museum was to be founded as follows:

- The Corporation agreed to dedicate the main portion of the building to the purposes of a Museum of Local (Essex) Natural History, Prehistoric Archaeology and Anthropology, and of educational series relating to the same; to warm, light, and provide for the caretaking of the building; that the Club should have the sole scientific control of the collections, and the appointment of the Curator, and be allowed to keep its Library in the building; the Corporation also agreeing to make a grant of not less than £100 per annum towards the curatorial expenses.
- The Club agreed to place their county collections, cases, and cabinets in the Museum (except the Epping Forest collections, which were to be retained in the Forest Museum at Chingford); to do their best to increase and improve the same; to undertake the selection and scientific control of the collections; to raise a certain capital sum for the further equipment of the Museum; to appoint a Curator, and to devote a sum of £50 per annum towards the curatorial expenses.

John Passmore Edwards contributed substantially to the foundation of the museum and its name was later changed to reflect this. On 6 October 1898 he laid the first stone.

The museum building adjoined the West Ham Technical Institute and was opened in 1900 by Daisy Greville, Countess of Warwick. Its central space had a galleried top-lit dome. It closed in 1994, and its collections were transferred to Newham Heritage Service and other museums. Its building is now used as the Student Union for the Stratford Campus of the University of East London.

== Source ==
- Distant, William Lucas (June 1899). "Editorial Gleanings". The Zoologist. 4th series, vol. 3 (696): 288.
