= Woolwich Arsenal station =

Docklands Light Railway and National Rail station

Woolwich Arsenal
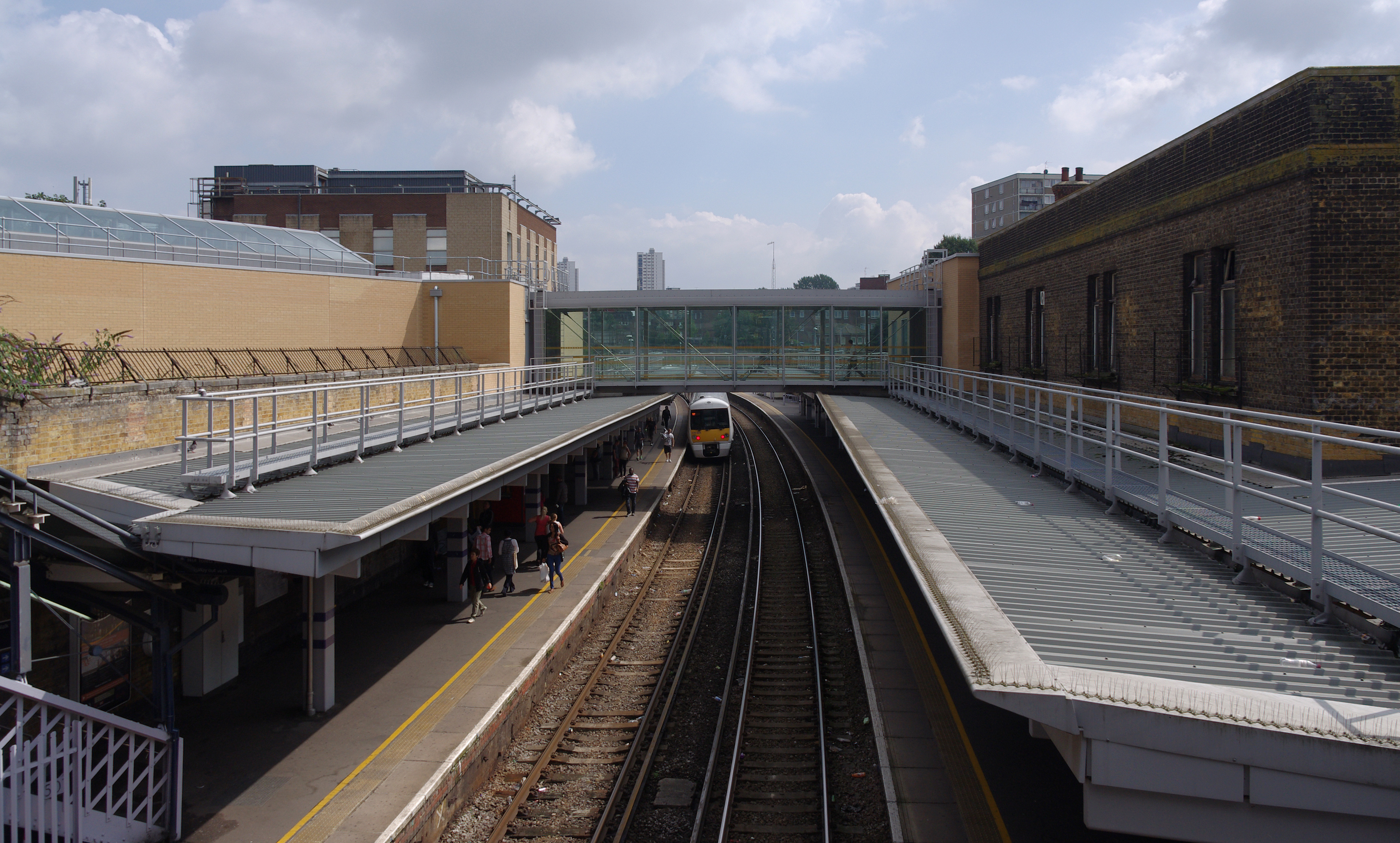
- Interactive map of Woolwich Arsenal

General information
- Location: Woolwich
- Local authority: Royal Borough of Greenwich
- Managed by: Southeastern
- Station code: WWA
- DfT category: C2
- Number of platforms: 4 (2 underground platforms served by DLR)
- Accessible: Yes
- Fare zone: 4
- OSI: Woolwich

DLR annual boardings and alightings
- 2021: ▲8.492 million
- 2022: ▼7.730 million
- 2023: ▼6.980 million
- 2024: ▼6.46 million
- 2025: ▼5.79 million

National Rail annual entry and exit
- 2020–21: ▼1.530 million
- 2021–22: ▲2.805 million
- 2022–23: ▼2.475 million
- 2023–24: ▼2.093 million
- 2024–25: ▲2.269 million

Key dates
- 1 November 1849: Opened
- 12 January 2009: DLR opened

Other information
- External links: Departures; Facilities
- Coordinates: 51.490°N 0.069°E

Woolwich Arsenal station is an interchange station in the heart of Woolwich in the Royal Borough of Greenwich for Docklands Light Railway (DLR) and National Rail services.

It has two parts; its raised, south-western part of the station is on the semi-slow, commuter service, corollary of the North Kent Line and also in its Dartford Loop services section between London and Dartford, run by Southeastern. Regular services beyond Dartford are to the Medway Towns, which start/finish in the opposite direction at Luton via the City of London, West Hampstead and St Albans. Its other part is the terminus of its own branch of the DLR, run by Transport for London.

The older part of the station, built in a modernist style, is located on a corner of General Gordon Square, a green town square. The newer part has entrances to Woolwich's subterranean end of the DLR, and faces the top of Powis Street, a long, semi-pedestrianised retail avenue. It is named after the area's Woolwich or Royal Arsenal, to distinguish the Arsenal site from the former Royal Dockyard, which before the 19th century was complemented with wharves and yards for large naval ships. In zoning it is the furthest DLR station – in London fare zone 4.

On the national network, it is 9 miles 32 chains (15.1 km) down from London Charing Cross.

== History ==
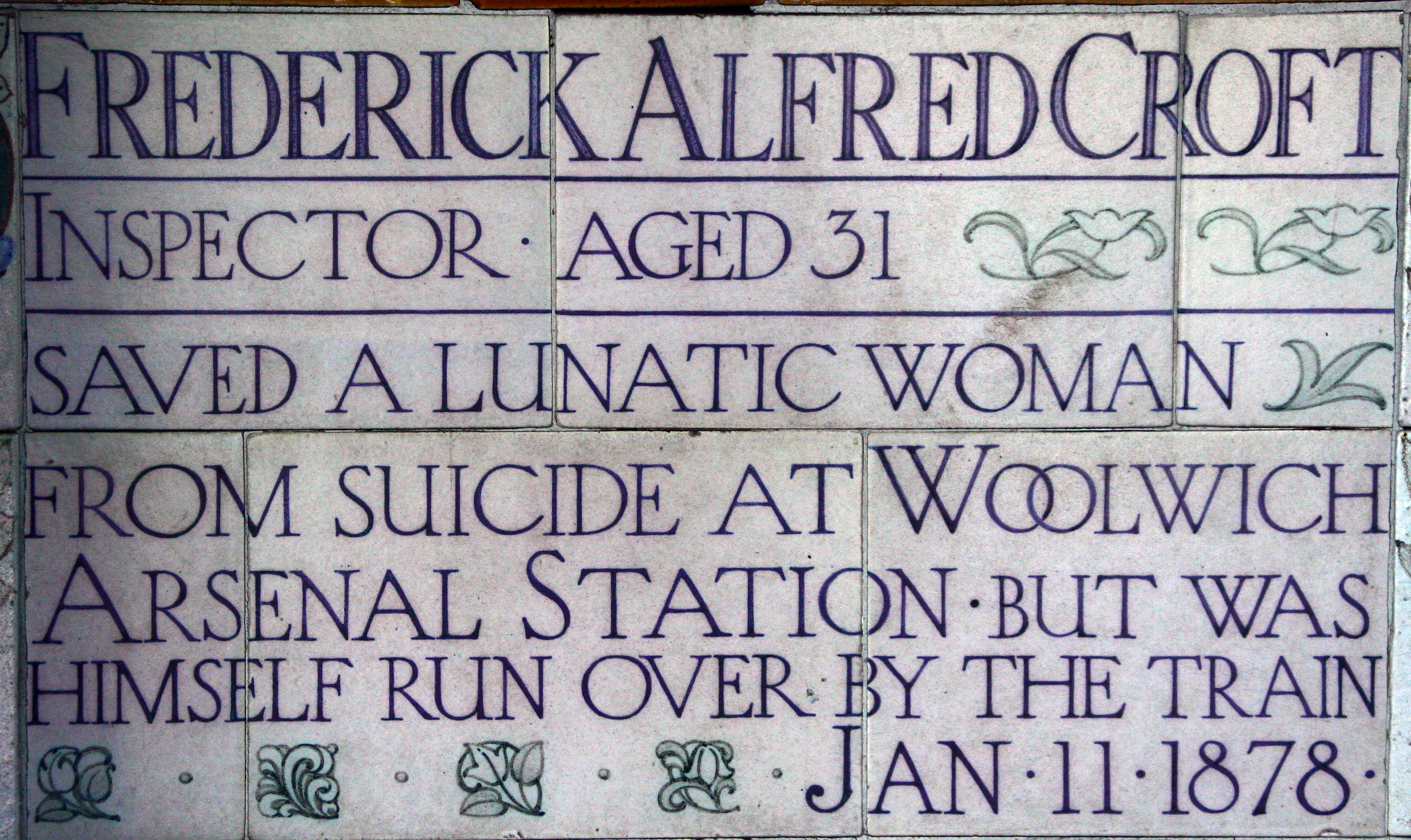
Memorial at Postman's Park to Inspector Frederick Croft, a railway police officer who lost his life saving a woman's life at the station in 1878.

The station opened in 1849, serving the North Kent Line from London to Gillingham. The station building was rebuilt in 1906 in a London brick form typical of southeast London. It was again rebuilt in 1992–93 to a modern design in steel and glass by the Architecture and Design Group of British Rail, under the leadership of Nick Derbyshire. It has a, clean, naturally-lit ellipsoid theme, contrasting with the earlier forms.

In 1973 a government report on the redevelopment of London's Docklands projected a greater form of the never-built "Fleet line" from Charing Cross via Fenchurch Street to Woolwich Arsenal and on towards Thamesmead, with a preceding stop at Silvertown. The Fleet line plans were shelved in favour of a route that became the western part of the Jubilee line, despite council (local government) approval, due to financial constraints. By the start of the 1990s plans emerged in both levels of government and business forums for the Jubilee Line Extension to serve the south bank of the Thames twice on its way to Stratford. In the Royal Borough of Greenwich the line takes in a small area, North Greenwich (a peninsula).

Woolwich Arsenal was expanded in 2009, when Transport for London completed the construction of an extension of what was then termed the London City Airport branch of the Docklands Light Railway from King George V to Woolwich Arsenal. The official opening took place on 12 January that year.

In 2014, a petition was started and presented to the then Mayor of London, Boris Johnson, to rezone Woolwich Arsenal station from Zone 4 to Zone 3. However he ruled this out, stating it would cause losses of over a million pounds a year.

== Accidents and incidents ==
- On 18 November 1948, a train – an electric multiple unit – crashed into the rear of another train, killing two people. It had departed from Woolwich Dockyard against signals.

== Design ==
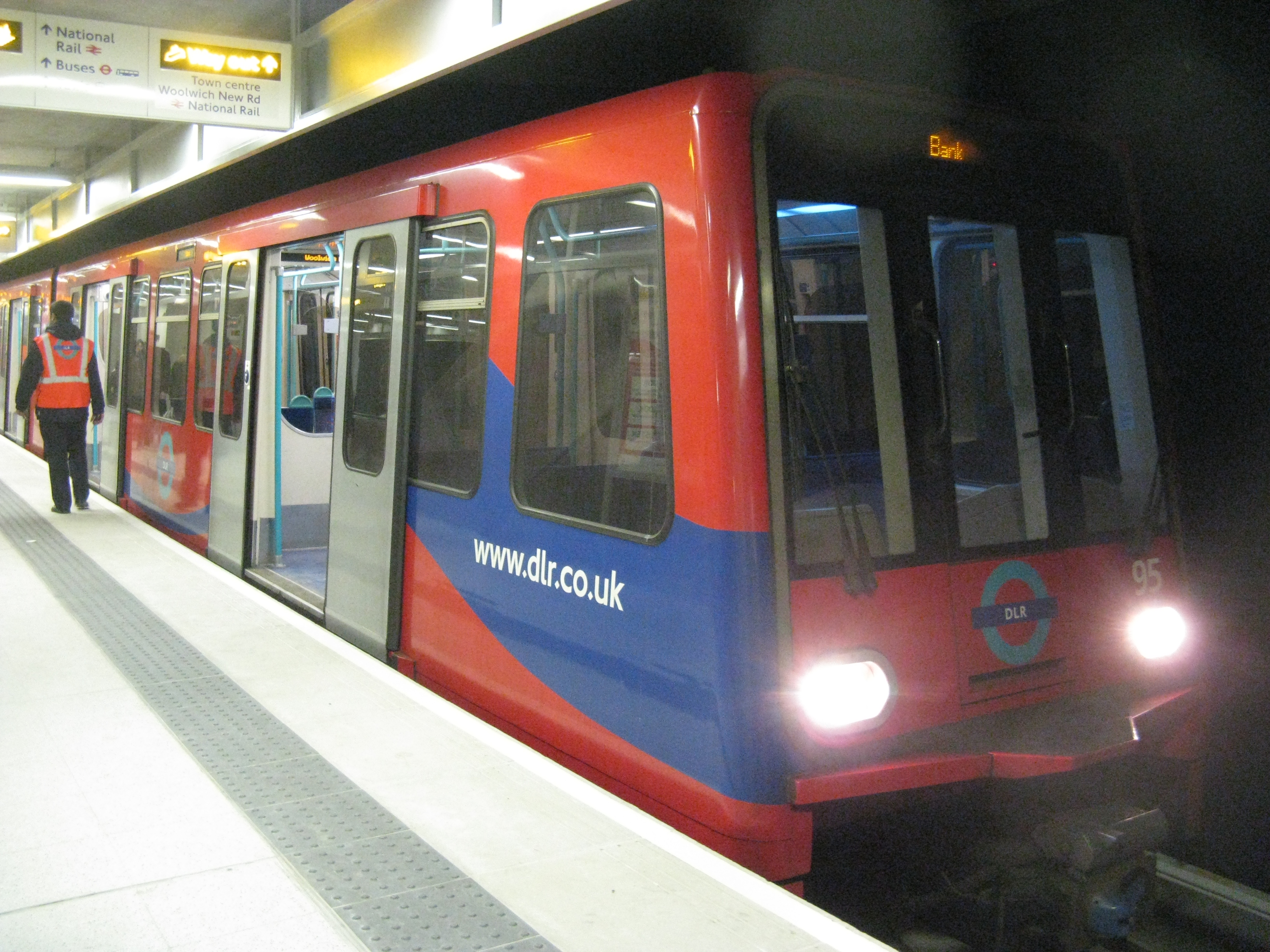
DLR train awaiting departure to Bank

The National Rail part of the station consists of two above-ground platforms. The up platform for London has a refreshment facility. The down platform serves trains going east, towards north Kent, via Plumstead, Abbey Wood and Slade Green.

The Docklands Light Railway part of the station is underground, and consists of two platforms in an island platform configuration. As Woolwich Arsenal is a terminus, both platforms serve an up line to Bank or Stratford International via London City Airport and Canning Town. Trains depart in an easterly direction because of the alignment beneath the River Thames.

== Connections ==
A large number of London Buses routes serve the station.

== Crossrail station at the former Royal Arsenal base ==
In May 2022 an Elizabeth line station opened in north-east Woolwich, after a campaign to complement housing developments built on former public-sector land. Among the successful lobbyists for this extra station were those who developed the land, including Berkeley Homes. The station is about 200 metres (660 ft) north of Woolwich Arsenal station, on the north side of the A206 road.

== Services ==
=== National Rail ===
National Rail services at Woolwich Arsenal are operated by Southeastern and Thameslink using Class 376, 465, 466, 700 and 707 EMUs.

The typical off-peak service in trains per hour is:

- 4 tph to London Cannon Street (2 of these run via Greenwich and 2 run via Lewisham)
- 2 tph to Luton via Greenwich
- 2 tph to Barnehurst, returning to London Cannon Street via Bexleyheath and Lewisham
- 2 tph to Dartford
- 2 tph to Rainham via Chatham

Additional services, including trains to and from London Cannon Street via Sidcup call at the station during the peak hours.

=== DLR ===
The typical off-peak DLR service in trains per hour from Woolwich Arsenal is:

- 6 tph to Stratford International
- 6 tph to Bank

Additional services during the peak hours, increasing the service to up to 16 tph to and from the station, with up to 8 tph to Bank and Stratford International.

Preceding station	National Rail	Following station
Charlton	Thameslink North Kent Line	Plumstead
Woolwich Dockyard	Southeastern North Kent Line	Plumstead
DLR
King George V towards Bank or Stratford International	Docklands Light Railway	Terminus
	Abandoned Plans	
Preceding station	London Underground	Following station
Silvertown towards Stanmore	Jubilee line Phase 3 (1980); Never constructed	Terminus
