= Eastern Counties and Thames Junction Railway =

Railway in east London

Overview
- Dates of operation: 1846–1862
- Successor: Great Eastern Railway

The Eastern Counties and Thames Junction Railway in east London connected the Royal Docks with the Eastern Counties Railway (ECR). Authorised in 1844, it opened in 1846, and was absorbed by the ECR in 1847. The ECR amalgamated with other railways to form the Great Eastern Railway in 1862.

== History ==
Eastern Counties and Thames Junction Railway Act 1844
- Act of Parliament
- Parliament of the United Kingdom
- Long title: An Act for making a Junction Railway from the Eastern Counties Railway at Stratford in the County of Essex to the River Thames, with a Branch Railway therefrom; and for constructing a Pier in the River Thames.
- Citation: 7 & 8 Vict. c. lxxi

Dates
- Royal assent: 4 July 1844
Other legislation
Repealed by	Great Eastern Railway Act 1862

Status: Repealed

North Woolwich Railway Act 1845
- Act of Parliament
- Parliament of the United Kingdom
- Long title: An Act for making a Railway from the Eastern Counties and Thames Junction Railway, near the Mouth of the River Lea, to North Woolwich.
- Citation: 8 & 9 Vict. c. lxxxv

Dates
- Royal assent: 21 July 1845

Eastern Counties Railway (North Woolwich) Act 1847
- Act of Parliament
- Parliament of the United Kingdom
- Long title: An Act to authorize the Purchase by the Eastern Counties Railway Company of the North Woolwich Railway and the Lease of the Pepper Warehouses and Wharfs of the East and West India Dock Company.
- Citation: 10 & 11 Vict. c. clvi

Dates
- Royal assent: 9 July 1847

Text of statute as originally enacted

The EC&TJR was incorporated by the Eastern Counties and Thames Junction Railway Act 1844 (7 & 8 Vict. c. lxxi) on 4 July 1844. It opened on 29 April 1846 from Stratford to Bow Creek to transport coal from a pier on the mouth of the River Lea. A year later it was extended to North Woolwich via Silvertown, under powers in the North Woolwich Railway Act 1845 (8 & 9 Vict. c. lxxxv), allowing connections with the Woolwich Ferry; the same year it was taken over by the Eastern Counties Railway under the Eastern Counties Railway (North Woolwich) Act 1847 (10 & 11 Vict. c. clvi).

Eastern Counties and Thames Junction Railway Branches Act 1846
- Act of Parliament
- Parliament of the United Kingdom
- Long title: An Act to enable the Eastern Counties Railway Company to make Two Branch Railways from the line of the Eastern Counties and Thames Junction Railway, one thereof terminating at the Pepper Warehouses belonging to the East India Dock Company, and the other terminating by a Junction with the Eastern Counties Railway.
- Citation: 9 & 10 Vict. c. ccclxvii

Dates
- Royal assent: 13 August 1846
Other legislation
Repealed by	Great Eastern Railway Act 1862

Status: Repealed

Text of statute as originally enacted

In 1846 a branch was added to the Pepper Warehouses belonging to the East India Dock Company, under the Eastern Counties and Thames Junction Railway Branches Act 1846 (9 & 10 Vict. c. ccclxvii) This entailed a drawbridge over Bow Creek (as depicted on OS London and its environs Sheet VIII.SW 1948).

When the Royal Victoria Dock opened in 1855 the line between Canning Town and North Woolwich had to have a swingbridge over the entrance to the dock, which increased journey times. In response, the line was rerouted north of the dock through two new stations, at Custom House and Tidal Basin. The southern line remained in service for local factories and was renamed the Silvertown Tramway.

After the construction of the Albert Dock, with the same problem envisaged on the route to Silvertown, in 1878 the railway built the 600 m (2,000 ft) cut and cover Connaught Tunnel (also known as the Silvertown Tunnel or Albert Dock Tunnel), at the new dock's entrance; it emerges on the eastern side just short of the old Tate & Lyle factory. In 1935, after it was discovered that larger ships entering the docks were scraping the roof of the tunnel, an iron casing was placed along the section under the dock.

In 1872 the Gas Light and Coke Company opened a branch running north-east to Beckton (not the site of Beckton DLR station) to serve its gasworks; in 1880, as the Royal Albert Dock opened, a branch line to Gallions was opened by the London and Saint Katharine Docks Company, which ran due east along the north edge of the dock to the River Thames on the far side of the dock. Both of these branches left the main line at Custom House. At the same time, the line was connected to the Palace Gates Line to Palace Gates in North London, and regular services between North Woolwich and Palace Gates operated. The line was quadrupled between Stratford Market and Tidal Basin in stages by 1892, though the western pair of tracks became less used over the years.

== Demise ==
The lines to Beckton and Gallions closed after bomb damage during the Blitz, as did Tidal Basin station. The line to Beckton reopened for goods (by-products from the gasworks), closing in 1972. The Palace Gates-North Woolwich line continued until 1963, when services were rerouted to Tottenham Hale, later terminating at Stratford.

In 1979 the diesel service from North Woolwich to Stratford was diverted via the old North London Railway via Dalston Kingsland to Camden Road and marketed as the Crosstown Linkline, a predecessor of the North London Line. In 1985 third-rail electrification was extended from Dalston via Stratford to North Woolwich, and electric trains started to run through from Richmond. The service was never as popular south of Stratford as on the rest of this route, and as services were enhanced from the original frequency the extra trains were terminated at Stratford. Part of the reason for this was that only one track beyond Custom House through the Connaught Tunnel was electrified, which restricted the service that could be provided on the easternmost section.

== Redevelopment ==
=== London Underground Jubilee line ===
The Jubilee Line Extension of the London Underground was built along the alignment of the former western tracks from Canning Town to Stratford, and opened in 1999. This took much of the remaining traffic from the line south of Stratford.

=== Docklands Light Railway ===
Part of the line between Custom House and Gallions was redeveloped as the Beckton branch of the Docklands Light Railway, as was a short section of the Beckton line between Woolwich Manor Way and the new Royal Docks Road.

With opening of the King George V branch of the DLR, the North London Line between Stratford and North Woolwich closed in December 2006. The stretch between Canning Town and Stratford was converted to become the Stratford International branch of the DLR, which opened in September 2011.

=== Crossrail ===
The Custom House to North Woolwich section of the railway, including the Connaught tunnel, has been reused as part of the Elizabeth line.

== Stations ==
Main line (opened 1846):

- Stratford
- Stratford Market (opened as Stratford Bridge, closed 1957, reopened 2011 as Stratford High Street)
- Canning Town
- Tidal Basin (opened 1858, closed 1943)
- Custom House (opened 1855)
- Silvertown (opened 1863, closed 2006)
- North Woolwich (closed 2006)

Branch from Custom House to Beckton (opened 1872, closed 1972):

- Beckton

Branch from Custom House to Gallions (opened 1874, closed 1940):

- Connaught Road
- Central
- Manor Way
- Gallions
