= Connaught Road railway station =

Former railway station in England

Connaught Road
- Interactive map of Connaught Road

General information
- Location: Royal Docks
- Owner: London and Saint Katharine Docks Company
- Number of platforms: 2

Key dates
- 1880: Opened
- 1940: Closed

Other information
- Coordinates: 51.50842°N 0.03755°E

Connaught Road was a railway station in east London that was opened by the London and Saint Katharine Docks Company on 3 August 1880. It was located on Connaught Road, north of the channel joining the Royal Victoria Dock and Royal Albert Dock.

The station was sited very close to the junction where the EC&TJR split into three branches (to Beckton, Gallions and North Woolwich), between Canning Town and Central stations, on the Gallions branch. Connaught Road was sparingly used by passenger services, which ceased from 8 September 1940 after destructive wartime bombing caused by a German air raid, and the goods line was closed with the closure of the Royal Docks.

With the redevelopment of London Docklands in the 1980s and 1990s, the line was replaced in 1994 by the Docklands Light Railway extension to Beckton. No trace of Connaught Road station remains today; the current Prince Regent and Royal Albert DLR stations are both roughly equidistant from the site.

Preceding station	Disused railways	Following station
Custom House	London and Saint Katharine Docks Company; Gallions Branch	Central
