= Rule Horror =

Genre of horror literature

In Zoo Rules Horror, the "elephant" in the elephant area sometimes turns white and grows rabbit ears

Rule Horror (simplified Chinese: 规则怪谈; traditional Chinese: 規則怪談; pinyin: Guīzé guàitán) is a form of online horror literature. This literary form constructs a bizarre world based on rule texts, evoking a sense of fear in readers. The genre is represented by Zoo Rules Horror, which emerged and became popular on the Chinese internet in November 2021.

== Origins and spread ==
The large-scale popularity of rule horror in the Chinese-speaking world is generally considered to have originated from Zoo Rules Horror on the anonymous Chinese forum A Island at the end of 2021. Prior to this, similar rule-based creepypastas belonged to niche hobbyist culture. In late November 2021, user phKeaLx (十六椰子, "Sixteen Coconut") posted on the horror section of A Island (A岛) a thread that presented multiple rules for a certain city's zoo, such as visitor guidelines, staff manuals, and aquarium notices. Unlike traditional novels, these contents have no obvious plot or characters and are merely rule descriptions written in an instructional style. The author constructed a bizarre world through multiple perspectives and contradictory rules, which quickly triggered extensive interpretations, fan creations, and dissemination across the Chinese internet. Driven by Zoo Rules Horror, many similar creations appeared on the Chinese internet, such as Index Ye Jiu's Chebyshev Candy Factory Rules Horror and Liu Chen's Closed School Rules Horror, among others. On Qidian and Jinjiang Literature City, numerous works featuring rule horror or rule horror elements also emerged. Xirang Chinese Network once held a "Daily Life and Horror" light novel solicitation event. Among them, Zoo Rules Horror is often regarded as the pinnacle of similar works.

== Content and features ==
......Rabbits do not make laughing sounds. If you hear laughter that is clearly not coming from visitors while visiting the rabbit area, before leaving the area, please tear off the dotted line on the map and hold it in your hand. Do not let go when you completely leave the zoo......

— Zoo Rules Horror, Visitor Guidelines (excerpt)

Rule horror generally comes in two forms. The first does not adopt the traditional novel narrative structure and lacks characters and coherent plots; the most famous example, Zoo Rules Horror, belongs to this category. The second is relatively traditional narrative novels that include characters, plots, and other conventional novel structures, using rule horror as a setting or a tool to advance the storyline. Taking Zoo Rules Horror as an example, the work consists of nine parts, including visitor guidelines, zoo staff rules, notes picked up by visitors, and so on. It appears similar to puzzle games or mystery novels, yet each rule is extremely concise and mechanically cold. Adjacent rules have no direct connection, and rules from different texts even contradict one another. For instance, the zoo's staff guidelines declare that the aquarium does not exist, while the aquarium's notice claims that the aquarium exists and does not serve any organization. The contradictions between different rules imply that no single rule is absolutely correct. At the same time, the author does not provide a clear truth, leaving readers with enormous imaginative space.

== Analysis and interpretation ==
Academia has offered multi-perspective interpretations of the rule horror phenomenon. Wang Xin of Shandong University argues that Zoo Rules Horror is a highly metaphorical text that constructs a terrifying world devoid of any sense of security. Modern society uses rules to avoid risks, but zoo rules horror destroys the reliability of rules by constructing contradictions between them, shattering the "safe zone" in readers' hearts and revealing the predicaments that arise when "disciplinary society" and "control society" intersect. Every guidance provided by the rules pushes people toward even greater danger. Rule horror "disciplines the spirit by disciplining the body," resulting in danger that "never disappears" in consciousness. Scholar Wang Yuxi believes that zoo rules horror also carries the shadow of Cthulhu literature. Rule horror and other horror novels with pseudo-Cthulhu settings differ from horror stories that directly depict physical violence; they emphasize creating terror through oppositions such as rationality and madness, order and chaos. The world of rule horror is one where order is out of control—whether one obeys or violates the rules, one may fall into the abyss at any moment. Therefore, rule horror can also be viewed as an allegorical story targeting the current bureaucratic social structure. Scholar Tang Xuetong also regards rule horror as a modern allegory of absurdism, reflecting on modernity through the absurdity of rules and thereby re-examining the many rules in everyday life.

== Cultural impact ==
After Zoo Rules Horror went viral in 2021, rule horror quickly moved from niche forum culture into mainstream online literature, short videos, and cross-media creations. On active Chinese novel platforms, one can find a large number of novels titled with "rule horror," many of which belong to romance, danmei, and other genres that have no direct connection to horror. In most long-form novels named after rule horror, the rules are not used for terror but serve as "background settings" to create a mysterious atmosphere in character relationships. This "backgroundization" of rule horror—where rules are no longer the main narrative subject but part of the world-building—also reflects its widespread popularity in Chinese online communities. Rule horror rapidly spawned games, short video narrations, fan creations, and more. Some works were adapted or influenced the development of other genres. After 2023, rule horror further integrated with AI-generated content, becoming one of the important themes in internet subculture. Meanwhile, the 2024 China Online Literature Blue Book noted that after shallow imitation of popular elements such as rule horror, problems such as increasingly similar techniques and scripts have emerged. As rule horror spreads among adolescents, its potential negative effects have also attracted attention. The 2025 issue of Banyuetan reported that rule-reasoning games represented by "rule horror" are popular among minors. These games often set seemingly reasonable but actually absurd and terrifying rules, blurring the boundary between normal and abnormal and easily leading to "cognitive confusion and mental panic."

== See also ==
- Urban legend
- Cthulhu Mythos
- ARG
- SCP Foundation
