= Manor Way railway station =

Railway station in east London

Manor Way
- Interactive map of Manor Way

General information
- Location: Cyprus, Beckton
- Owner: London and Saint Katharine Docks Company
- Number of platforms: 2

Key dates
- 1880: Opened
- 1887: re-sited slightly east
- 1940: Closed
- Replaced by: Gallions Reach

Other information
- Coordinates: 51.5074°N 0.0699°E

Manor Way was a railway station south of Beckton in east London, on the London and Saint Katharine Docks Company's line.

== History ==
It opened in November 1880 on Woolwich Manor Way in the parish of North Woolwich. It was between Central and Gallions stations on the Gallions branch of the line. It was re-sited to the east side of the Manor Way in 1887.

Manor Way was sparingly used by passenger services, which ceased in 1940 after wartime bombing, and the goods line closed with the subsequent closure of the Royal Docks.

With the redevelopment of the Docklands region in the 1980s and 1990s, the line was replaced in 1994 by the Docklands Light Railway extension to Beckton. No trace of the station remains today (the University of East London's Cyprus campus lies on the original 1880 site), although Gallions Reach DLR station is 200 yards (180 m) north-east of the site.

Preceding station	Disused railways	Following station
Central	London and Saint Katharine Docks Company; Gallions Branch	Gallions
