= Beckton station =

Beckton station may mean:

- Beckton DLR station, Docklands Light Railway station
- Beckton railway station, closed in 1940
- Beckton tube station, unbuilt Jubilee line station proposed in the 1970s
