= Gallions railway station =

Former railway station in England

Gallions
- Interactive map of Gallions

General information
- Location: Gallions Reach
- Local authority: London Borough of Newham
- Owner: London and Saint Katharine Docks Company
- Number of platforms: 2

Key dates
- 1880: Opened
- 1886: Relocated east
- 1940: Closed

Other information
- Coordinates: 51.5066°N 0.0771°E

Gallions was the name of two distinct railway stations that adjoined the River Thames by Gallions Reach in Beckton, east London.

== Opening of the branch and First station ==
Construction of a railway line from Custom House to Gallions was authorized by an act of Parliament that had also approved the construction of the Royal Albert Dock. The London and Saint Katharine Docks Company opened the branch on 3 August 1880, initially as far as Central, and it was fully opened when it reached the Gallions terminus in November 1880. The facility consisted of two platforms.

There were two primary reasons for building the branch. Firstly, the size of the docks necessitated a transport link to enable business and commuting to and from the docks. Secondly, because the Albert Dock handled passengers, easier access to the quays was required to connect ships that left for all parts of the British Empire. This was why a hotel was built adjacent to the terminus, which is mentioned in The Light That Failed by Rudyard Kipling (who actually stayed at the hotel) where the hero asks a P&O clerk, "Is it Tilbury and a tender or Gallions and the dock?".

== Second station ==
The station was subsequently relocated 275 yards further east, reopening on 12 December 1886, to facilitate the development of the dock.

The new terminus was located on a different alignment from its predecessor, which diverged at Manor Way slightly to the north. It consisted of an island platform with two platform faces: Platform 1 was generally used by the Great Eastern Railway (GER) services, and Platform 2 was used by the shuttle service operated by the dock company towards Custom House. Each of the platforms had a loop for locomotives to run around, with a water tower located at the end. Access to the platforms was from a footbridge at the west end of the station. The signal box contained 21 working and seven spare levers.

The tracks continued beyond the end of the platforms to the docks and a pier. In the later years, William Cory & Son Limited operated the pier, which handled coal and employed their locomotives for shunting.

== Locomotives ==
The line was operated by locomotives wholly owned by the dock company. Initially, the first locomotives were hired from the construction contractors Lucas and Aird, but later they were replaced by three 2-4-0T locomotives that were formerly owned by the London and North Western Railway (LNWR). These were numbered as No. 5 (LNWR No. 1819, built 1850), No. 6 (LNWR No. 1927, built 1849) and No. 7 (LNWR No. 436, built 1847). (Note: Note that these numbers were the last ones they carried on the LNWR, and the dock company also had other locomotives to shunt the docks and wharves in the area.) All three were allocated to the Custom House engine shed. In an 1890 photograph of one of these locomotives, it was seen carrying the name "Royal Albert Dock" on its water tanks.

== Services ==
When the service first started, two trains operated per hour. However, due to increased demand, the service was increased to three trains per hour by 1881. The GER began offering regular through-services to Fenchurch Street, some of which were routed via Bow Road and Stratford, while most of them were routed via Bromley-by-Bow and a spur at Abbey Mills Junction. Additional Liverpool Street services and shorter workings from Stratford (low-level platforms) or Stratford Bridge were later introduced.

On 1 January 1889 the London and Saint Katharine Docks Company and the East and West India Dock Company organizations united and started operating as a joint committee. They later merged in 1901 and became the London and India Docks Company.

The GER took over operation of all the train services in July 1896 when the dock company's three former LNWR locomotives were withdrawn.

Around the turn of the century the line reached its zenith in terms of passengers carried and in 1900 there were 53 weekday services each way.

These broke down as:

- 35 - Custom House
- 16 - Fenchurch Street (2 via Bow Road and Stratford Market)
- 2 - Stratford/Stratford Market

During World War I, Sunday services were withdrawn on 27 June 1915, followed by bank holiday workings in 1918. In early 1918, a special daily service was introduced for munitions workers of Woolwich Arsenal, which ran east of the station to a jetty for a connecting service; this service ceased at the end of the war.

On 31 March 1909 all remaining London dock companies merged and became the Port of London Authority (PLA), which became responsible for the operation of the branch and Gallions station.

In 1923, the GER became part of the London and North Eastern Railway (LNER), which took over the train workings. Throughout the branch's lifetime, the signal boxes and level crossings were in the responsibility of the dock company.

Passenger services continued to decline, and in 1932 the shuttle service from Custom House was withdrawn, leaving only the remaining through services. At the beginning of World War II, the service was further reduced and stopped operating between 13:10 on Saturdays and 07:20 on Sundays.

The 1938 timetable showed:

- 8 - Fenchurch Street (2 via Bow Road and Stratford Market),
- 3 - Stratford/Stratford Market
- 4 - Victoria Park

== Closure ==
After the Gallions terminus suffered severe bomb damage on 7 September 1940, it was closed and a replacement bus service was introduced. Goods trains continued to operate on the Royal Docks over adjacent PLA-owned lines.

The branch was eventually repaired and used for occasional trains to and from Cory's, as well as for wagon storage. This traffic ended in 1967.

The station building at Gallions was probably demolished in the early 1960s. (Note: Noted by Connor as extant in the 1950s, but gone by 1965.)

With the redevelopment of London Docklands in the 1980s and 1990s, the line between Custom House and Manor Way was turned into an extension of the Docklands Light Railway to Beckton. However, the final section between Manor Way and Gallions was not used and has since been built over. There is no trace of Gallions station left today, except for the hotel that stood adjacent to it. The hotel served as a public house until 1972 and included part of the original station platform. A study of photographs of the hotel in 2015 and via Google Earth suggests that the area has since been landscaped.

== Notes ==
Preceding station	Disused railways	Following station
Manor Way	London and Saint Katharine Docks Company; Gallions Branch	Terminus
