= Tidal Basin railway station =

Former railway station in England

Tidal Basin
- Interactive map of Tidal Basin

General information
- Location: Royal Victoria Dock
- Owner: Eastern Counties Railway
- Number of platforms: 2

Key dates
- 1858: Opened
- 15 August 1943: Closed
- Replaced by: Royal Victoria DLR

Other information
- Coordinates: 51.5090°N 0.0149°E

Tidal Basin railway station was a railway station near the Royal Victoria Dock, Canning Town, London, on the Eastern Counties and Thames Junction Railway. It opened in 1858, and was between Canning Town and Custom House stations. The station was damaged by bomb damage during the Blitz in 1941 but remained open until closed in 1943 as passenger numbers had fallen resulting from the area suffering from severe bombing damage and never reopened. The area was heavily redeveloped following the War, and today no trace remains; its approximate location is south east of Tarling Road (formerly Alice Street), east of the present day footbridge. Royal Victoria DLR station is located approximately 300 yards east.

It was located between Canning Town station to the west and Custom House station to the east.
