= Central railway station (London) =

Former railway station in England

Central
- Interactive map of Central

General information
- Location: Royal Albert Dock/Beckton Park
- Owner: London and Saint Katharine Docks Company
- Number of platforms: 2

Key dates
- 3 August 1880: Opened
- 9 September 1940: Closed
- Replaced by: None

Other information
- Coordinates: 51.50828°N 0.05397°E

Central was a railway station near the Royal Albert Dock and Beckton Park, in east London. It was served by the London and Saint Katharine Docks Company and was located between Connaught Road and Manor Way stations, on the Gallions branch of the line.

Central station was opened on 3 August 1880. It had few passenger services, which ceased in 1940 due to wartime bombing, while the goods line ceased operation with the closure of the Royal Docks. With the redevelopment of the Docklands area in the 1980s and 1990s, the line was replaced in 1994 by the Docklands Light Railway (DLR) extension to Beckton.

No trace of Central station remains, although Beckton Park DLR station is currently situated on or very close to the site.

Preceding station	Disused railways	Following station
Connaught Road	London and Saint Katharine Docks Company; Gallions Branch	Manor Way
