= Full time children =

Chinese job of doing household chores for parents

Full time children (Chinese: 全职儿女; pinyin: Quánzhí érnǚ) is a chinese internet term, which refers to young adults who live with their parents by doing housework or providing companionship in exchange for financial support. It is also known as full-time daughters or full-time sons. Some of them use their own savings but live with parents.

The rise of full-time children in China has been associated with rising youth unemployment, stressful working conditions, and changes in family relationships in China.

Some report improvements in their physical and mental health after leaving stressful jobs, while others experience anxiety about extended employment gaps and feelings of guilt toward their parents. Many have fewer contacts with people of their own age and rely more on the online community to communicate with others.

Public debate focused on whether full time children are a new form of work or it's just another of living off one's parents. Some media coverage views it as mutual family support. However, some critics argue it is an acceptable way to depend on parents.

== Etymology and meaning ==
The term combines quanzhi (全职, 'full-time') with ernü (儿女, 'sons and daughters'). "Quanzhi" (全职) refers to a word normally used for paid employment. "Ernü" (儿女) means daughters and sons. The forms "full-time daughter" (全职女儿) and "full-time son" (全职儿子) are also used as hashtags on social media in China.

Liu Wenrong, a researcher from the Shanghai Academy of Social Sciences, said the term is more comfortable for young people to accept and gives them a transitional role during self-improvement periods. The term allows room for denial and self-deprecation, Lu Xi, an assistant professor at the National University of Singapore said.

== Origin and online community ==
The term originated from the Douban platform in December 2022. Douban users created a discussion group called 全职儿女工作交流中心 (pinyin: Quánzhí Érnǚ Gōngzuò Jiāoliú Zhōngxīn; translation, "Full-Time Children Work Exchange Center"). The group described full-time children as young people who leave work to live with their parents in exchange for financial support while continuing their studies or preparing for civil service or graduate school entrance exams. The term spread to other platforms like Xiaohongshu, Weibo, Douyin, and Zhihu around 2023. Some full-time children use these platforms to document their daily lives and household tasks, such as cleaning, cooking, and running errands.

According to Liao and Yang's study, discussions about full-time children on Zhihu tend to be analytical, while posts on Xiaohongshu often use first-person narratives and personal experiences.

== Characteristics ==
=== Demographics ===
Full-time children were usually born after 1995 and are preparing to look for work or apply for further study. Tian Yunxiang and Pan Lu found that the group of full-time children are recent graduates with little work experience who are unmarried and have no children. Many have a university education, and some have studied abroad. Ma also identifies a small group of full-time children born in the 1970s and 1980s. Most of this group are women who leave work to care full-time for a sick parent.

=== Exchange care for support ===
Full-time children do housework and keep their parents company, while their parents provide money, meals, and housing. Their tasks include buying groceries, cooking, caring for pets, collecting deliveries, and accompanying parents to medical appointments. Some also help their parents use digital technology, and some tutor younger siblings or relatives to reduce family costs. Tian and Pan found that many full-time children see their main role as providing emotional comfort rather than doing housework. Some full-time children sign agreements with their parents, like promising to always reply to calls and messages.

=== Payment ===
Sun Yongjian found that most families did not call the money a wage but treated it as pocket money or household costs. The amount of money and the time when they receive the money are flexible. Some full-time children have no payment and live on their own savings, while others earn money from part-time work such as tutoring or making short videos on social media. In some families, the money comes from the interest on the parents' savings.

=== Duration ===
Some full-time children regard the role as temporary. Tian and Pan found that few of them want to keep this identity for a long time, and they hope to pass an exam or find a stable job. But for those who are caring for sick relatives, the role depends on the sick relative's health.

== Causes ==
Labor market pressures, young people's experiences of work, and changes in family structure are cited as reasons for its existence.

=== Labor market pressures ===
Youth unemployment in China rose sharply in 2023. During the COVID-19 pandemic, employers' demand for labor fell, but the number of graduates kept rising. Some young adults became full-time children after being laid off, while others could not find suitable work after graduating. Ma describes the trend as a sign of the lasting "scarring effect" of the pandemic on young people. Many full-time children use this time at home to prepare for civil service, public-sector or graduate school entrance exams.

=== Experiences of work ===
Some young people leave their jobs because of heavy workloads, long hours, intense workplace competition, or low pay, and they return home to recover. Some young people said they stopped looking for work after repeated failures, while others felt unable to choose among their options or found their previous jobs meaningless.

=== Family factors ===
Full-time children usually come from families that can afford to support them. Song's study found that their interviewees were generally urban, unmarried and from families with savings. Some parents are willing to give their children time rather than pressure them to work immediately, since the relationship between parents and adult children is becoming more equal. However, some young people return home to look after sick or elderly parents, particularly when their family cannot or does not want to hire professional caregivers.

Han links the trend to neo-familism, which refers to more reliance on family during economic uncertainty. Rao argues that limited social welfare makes young people more dependent on their families. However, taking adult children back can put extra pressure on families that are already struggling.

== Public perception ==
Public discussion mainly focused on whether being a full-time child is a new kind of job or just another way of living off one's parents. Some critics say the term makes depending on parents sound better. Others say it is a way for young people to get away from too much competition. Ou Lei and Yang hua says that a few news reports mostly focus on negative cases, which makes stereotypes about this group stronger. But some people argue that there should be more understanding for full-time children.

Tian and Pan explain that kenlao refers to adults who live with their parents without working or contributing to the family. In contrast, full-time children treat caring for their parents and doing housework as a form of work. Sun describes the relationship as mutual support. Parents mainly provide financial support, while their adult children provide housework and emotional support.

Song and colleagues argue that full-time children who stay home for a long time without preparing for employment may become similar to kenlao. But the emotional work of full-time children is often overlooked because caring for parents is regarded as a basic duty for adult children in China.

Rao said it gives young people time to recover from setbacks, but it also places risks on families that society should help share.

=== Media coverage ===
In 2023, several Chinese media outlets commented on the trend.

An article published on the digital platform of People's Daily warned full-time children not to become too comfortable with their current lifestyle.

Banyuetan called for more understanding of young people who take a break from job hunting. It also warned against labeling them too quickly.

The Beijing News argued that full-time children contribute to their families and are therefore different from kenlao.

Lu Xi, a researcher at the National University of Singapore, argued that some state media portrayed the phenomenon as an act of filial piety, while the main issue was unemployment.
