= Beckton railway station =

Disused railway station in Beckton, London

Beckton
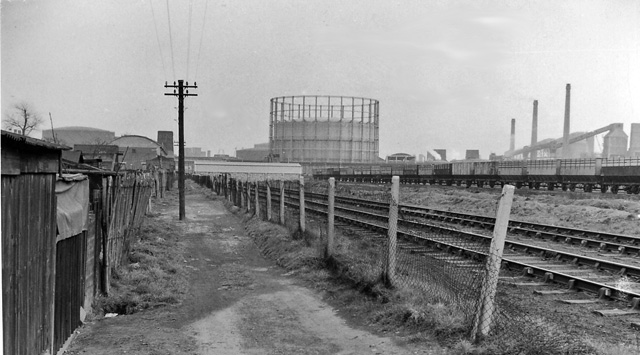
- Site of Beckton railway station in 1962
- Interactive map of Beckton

General information
- Location: Beckton
- Grid reference: TQ438815
- Owner: Gas Light and Coke Company
- Number of platforms: 1

Key dates
- 1874: Opened
- 1940: Closed

Other information
- Coordinates: 51.51438°N 0.07225°E

Beckton railway station was a railway station in Beckton, London originally owned by the Gas Light and Coke Company, to serve the (then) recently built Beckton Gas Works. The line was opened for freight in 1872 and to passengers in 1874. It was leased to the Great Eastern Railway from 1874.

== History ==
Beckton was the only station on the Beckton branch of the railway, which left the EC&TJR at Custom House, heading initially east by north-east before levelling out to due east once it crossed what is today the Woolwich Manor Way. The station shut to passengers in 1940 after bombing in the Blitz cut it off from the rest of the network. Passenger services were not resumed when the line reopened as by now the works was better served by bus services using the Barking by-pass. The branch survived as a freight line, with the last trainload of pitch from the works leaving in December 1970.

== Replacement ==
Today, most of the line to Beckton has been taken up and is now a public footpath, known as the "Beckton Corridor". A short stretch of the line east of Woolwich Manor Way has been reused as the final part of the Beckton branch of the Docklands Light Railway. Beckton DLR station is located several hundred yards west of Beckton railway station; "eastbound" trains from Gallions Reach loop back round over the old line in the reverse direction, entering the station from the east.
