= Silvertown railway station =

Former railway station in London

Silvertown
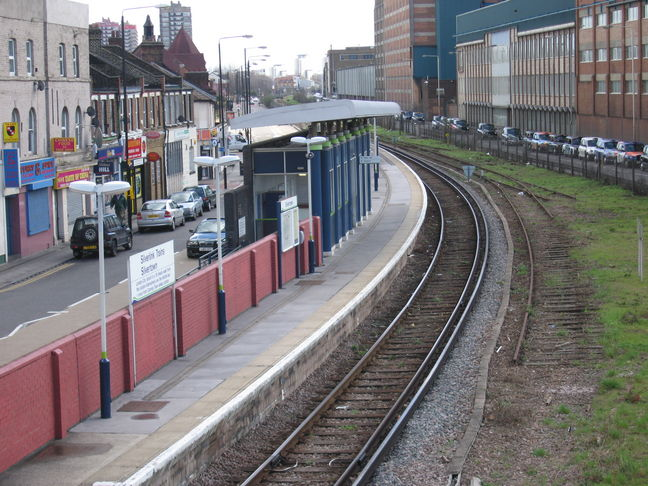
- In April 2006 a single track and platform were still in use, with disused infrastructure still visible

General information
- Location: Silvertown, Newham, London; England
- Coordinates: 51.5019°N 0.0452°E
- Owner: Network Rail
- Manager: Silverlink
- Platforms: 1

Other information
- Station code: SVW
- Fare zone: 3

History
- Original company: Eastern Counties Railway
- Pre-grouping: Great Eastern Railway
- Post-grouping: London and North Eastern Railway

Key dates
- 19 June 1863: Opened as Silvertown
- 4 October 1987: Renamed Silvertown and London City Airport
- 29 May 1994: Closed
- 29 October 1995: Reopened
- 30 September 2001: Renamed Silvertown
- 9 December 2006: Closed

Passengers
- National Rail entry and exit
- 2004/05: ▼22,563
- 2005/06: ▲24,765
- 2006/07: ▲250,771
Location

Silvertown railway station was on the North London Line (NLL) serving the Silvertown area of east London. The station and the eastern section of the line it was on were closed in 2006. It was situated between Custom House (now a Docklands Light Railway and Elizabeth line station) and North Woolwich, the now closed eastern terminus of the line.

== History ==
=== Great Eastern Railway (1863-1922) ===
The first line in the area was the Eastern Counties and Thames Junction Railway which ran from Stratford to North Woolwich and ran just south of the eventual Silvertown station site. In 1855 a new route was opened from Canning Town and was routed via the north side of Royal Victoria Dock crossing the cut that joined it to Royal Albert Dock by a swing bridge. The new line joined the original line at a junction just east of the station and the new line became the route for passenger trains. The original line was renamed the Silvertown Tramway and served river and dock industries.

It is worth noting that in 1855 a lot of industrial and residential development was yet to happen in the Silvertown area.

Indicating the area was developing as a residential district, in 1861/2 St Mark's Church, Silvertown was constructed between the two railway lines and still survives in 2026.

Silvertown station was opened in 1863 by the Great Eastern Railway, who had succeeded the Eastern Counties Railway

The swing bridge became a bottleneck in dock operations so in 1878 the route west of the station was diverted via the newly opened 550m Connaught Tunnel whilst the 1855 route remained open for goods traffic.

Silvertown station was rebuilt in 1881 with an extended brick station building, wooden platforms and a covered footbridge.

=== London & North Eastern Railway (1923-1947) ===
Following the 1921 Railways Act the station became the responsibility of the London & North Eastern Railway (LNER) on 1 January 1923.

The early part of World War II saw a down turn in passenger numbers. Early on in the war dock workers and plant were reassigned to other ports located on the coast. During the late summer of 1940 during the Blitz the Royal Docks were badly bombed by the Luftwaffe and the train service through Silvertown had to be cut short at Custom House from 7 September 1940 to 1 December 1941. The North African invasion of 1942 and then D-Day in 1944 saw activity at the docks and the station return.

One of the results of the bombing is that many of the tightly packed houses north of the line had been reduced to rubble. Dockers had moved away and were increasingly using road transport to access the area.

=== British Railways (1948-1994) ===
Silvertown station became an Eastern Region station when the UK railways were nationalised on 1 January 1948. By the 1960s the docks and railways were in decline.

The signal box was closed on 24 August 1969 and by 1971 the top level had been demolished.

At this time the up line was converted to be used by goods services dealing with remaining traffic from the Silvertown factories and Wards scrapyard. Passenger services used the down line and the single whilst passenger services used the down line. North Woolwich was also reduced to a single platform and thus when a down service entered the single-line section it would have to arrive at North Woolwich and then depart back and arrive at Custom House before the next down train could depart.

In 1973 a government report on the redevelopment of London's Docklands proposed an extension of the unbuilt Fleet line from Charing Cross via Fenchurch Street to Woolwich Arsenal, with stations on each side at Custom House and Woolwich Arsenal. The proposal was developed during the 1970s as the Fleet line developed into the Jubilee line. Although approved in 1980, financial constraints meant that the route was not proceeded with. By the start of the 1990s new plans had been developed to extend the Jubilee line on a route south of the River Thames towards Stratford.

A decline in use of the station led to the removal of one of the two platforms in 1980, leaving just one platform to serve trains in both directions. The other track was retained as a freight only line. North Woolwich station was also reduced to one platform at this time.

After third rail electrification of the line in 1985 by British Rail, services were increased and the single-track section became a bottleneck. Prior to closure, the typical Monday to Saturday service frequency westbound towards Stratford and eastbound towards North Woolwich was one train every 30 minutes during the daytime, increasing to one every 20 minutes in the evening; one train called every 30 minutes all day on Sundays.

=== The privatisation era (1994-2012) ===
After London City Airport opened nearby there was an attempt to offer the station for connection to the airport, the station being renamed Silvertown and London City Airport on 4 October 1987, but the walk through adjacent side streets, and the relatively infrequent service, which was peripheral rather than into central London, led to little usage of the airport interchange.

Following privatisation the stations was operated by the Silverlink who started operations on 2 March 1997. For a short period the trains were marketed as North London Railways and throughout the rest of the franchise Class 313 EMUs operated services.

As a result of few airport passengers using the station the name reverted to Silvertown on 30th September 2001. In the years before closure Silvertown was one of the ten least used stations in the London area.

In December 2006 the line between Stratford and North Woolwich was permanently closed to make a way for a future DLR extension from Canning Town to Stratford International (which opened in February 2011). Silvertown station was closed on 9 December 2006. The nearest DLR station to the disused Silvertown station is London City Airport.

The remaining station buildings and platforms were demolished in 2012 as part of the construction of Crossrail, by Vinci, the contractor responsible for the reconditioning of the Connaught tunnel. Despite talk of constructing a replacement station nearby, this has not been provided for in the Crossrail Act 2008. Nevertheless, passive provision has been made for a station shortly to the east in the event of development of nearby properties.

== Description ==
=== 1930s ===
A level crossing existed at the west end of the station which was a toll-road. From opening the station had two tracks and two wooden platforms. The station building was on the up (towards London) side.

In 1881 the station was upgraded with an enlarged brick station building, additional awnings on the up platform and the original timber platforms were extended for longer trains. The two platforms were linked by a covered footbridge. A signal box was provided and this was higher than the station building, its lofty position giving the signaller a good view of the junction with the Silvertown Tramway. It also housed the entrance to the station building.

=== Before closure ===
The up line was converted to goods only operation in 1967 and the up platform was demolished. A new station building was provided in 1980 and further refurbished using GLC funding as part of the cross-London Link.

=== Silvertown Tramway ===
The eastern end of the Silvertown Tramway was located a short distance east from the station. This was a goods only line that started south of Canning Town and served a number of factories and works along its route. When the Eastern Counties and Thames Junction Railway opened the line in 1844 this was in fact the main line to North Woolwich. This arrangement lasted to 1855 when a new route was added that was routed via a new route. After this date the original route was named the Silvertown Tramway (and also known as the "Abandoned Line") which served several factories, Thames side wharves and engineering works some of which had their own shunting locomotive.

The tramway was owned by the dock company and later the Port of London Authority but the LNER and later British Railways operated the line. Outward traffic was gathered at Silvertown sidings just west of the site for onward movement.

In 1964 there were 18 companies still connected to the Silvertown tramway.

By the 1990s only a scrap yard Ward Ferrous Metals scrapyard remained at the Silvertown end and had utilised a number of industrial diesel shunters as part of its operations. Rail traffic finished on 15 September 1991.

== Operations ==
=== Passenger Services ===
Before Silvertown station opened trains operated between Bishopsgate and North Woolwich.

After 1855 passenger trains used the 1855 route but it was not until 1863 that Silvertown was open for rail traffic. By 11 October 1858 trains from Fenchuch Street via Stratford Bridge and in 1858 a second Fenchurch Street service via Bromley-by-Bow and a curve at Abbey Mills with departures from North Woolwich alternating on departure.

In 1876 trains were diverted via the Connaught Tunnel route.

The Bradshaw's timetable guide of 1910 details a total of 63 up weekday trains North Woolwich and calling at Silvertown consisted of:

1910 up services serving Silvertown station.
Destination	Number	remarks
Fenchurch Street	26	via Bromley by Bow
Fenchurch Street	26	via Stratford Bridge and Bow
Palace Gates	11	via Stratford Low-Level platforms, Lea Bridge and Seven Sisters.

Road access to the area was difficult until the opening of the Silverton Way road which carried the roads over the various dockside railways. A trolley bus service was extended into the Silvertown area in 1938 and the new electric trolleybus attracted many rail passengers away from the gas lit, grubby steam worked services being run by the LNER.

After bombing closed the Custom House to North Woolwich section from 1 January 1941 the half-hourly service operated from North Woolwich to Stratford Low-Level platforms with peak hour extensions to Palace Gates.

Between the end of the war and then end of steam services passenger services were run by Class N7 0-6-2T later supplemented by LNER Thompson Class L1 2-6-4Ts hauling rakes of GER Quint-Art carriage sets.

In 1962 there were 38 up trains calling at Silvertown consisting of nine Palace Gates services with the rest terminating at Stratford Low-Level platforms. Some Class 125 DMUs started working services and eventually succeeded the steam worked services. The closure of the Palace Gates branch on 7 January 1963 saw services terminating at Tottenham Hale. Saturday services ended on 4 January 1969.

The 14 May 1979 timetable saw a major change with the Silvertown service being linked to a new service from Camden Road where it connected with Broad Street to Richmond services.

Following third rail electrification of the line in late 1984 and early 1995 along with the closure of Broad Street, the May 1985 timetable ran from North Woolwich to Richmond. The service was worked by British Rail Class 416 Electric Multiple Units for 4 years before Class 313 EMUs took over.

Prior to closure in 2009, the typical Monday to Saturday service frequency westbound towards Stratford and eastbound towards North Woolwich was one train every 30 minutes during the daytime, increasing to one every 20 minutes in the evening; one train called every 30 minutes all day on Sundays.

=== Silvertown Goods Depot ===
The GER opened a goods depot which was accessed by road from the North Woolwich Road and from the Silvertown Tramway. It was a brick built single tracked affair and supplied with an electronic telegraph. Little else is known of the establishment located in an area heavily bombed during World War II but its official closure date was 5 May 1967.

=== Proposals ===
In 2017 there were proposals from London City Airport to fund the construction of a £50 million Crossrail station so as to serve London City Airport. However, Transport for London require a formal feasibility study from City Airport to be completed. This is so that progress of the Crossrail project would not be affected by station's construction. In 2025, TfL set out that they did not support an additional Elizabeth line station in the area, as it could lead to increased operating costs and slower journeys for existing passengers using the line.

Disused railways
Preceding station	National Rail	Following station
Custom House towards Richmond	Silverlink North London Line	North Woolwich Terminus
Preceding station	London Underground	Following station
Custom House towards Stanmore	Jubilee line Phase 3 (1980) (never constructed)	Woolwich Arsenal Terminus
