= Beckton =

Area in East London, England

Coordinates: 51.5146°N 0.0673°E

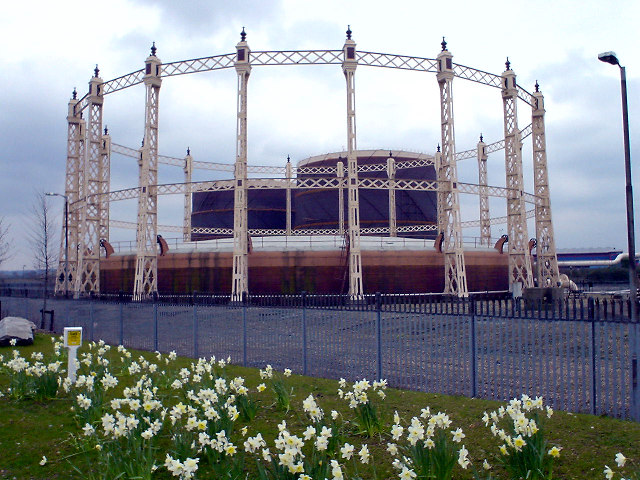
- Gas holders at Beckton

- Location within Greater London
- Population: 33,247 (ward, 2021)
- OS grid reference: TQ435815
  - Charing Cross: 8 mi (12.9 km) W
- London borough: Newham
- Ceremonial county: Greater London
- Region: London
- Country: England
- Sovereign state: United Kingdom
- Post town: LONDON
- Postcode district: E6
- Dialling code: 020
- Police: Metropolitan
- Fire: London
- Ambulance: London
- UK Parliament: West Ham and Beckton
- London Assembly: City and East

Beckton is a suburb in East London, England, located eight miles (thirteen kilometres) east of Charing Cross and part of the London Borough of Newham. Adjacent to the River Thames, the area consisted of unpopulated marshland known as the East Ham Levels in the parishes of Barking, East Ham, West Ham and Woolwich. The development of major industrial infrastructure in the 19th century to support the growing metropolis of London caused an increase in population with housing built in the area for workers of the Beckton Gas Works and Beckton Sewage Treatment Works. The area has a convoluted local government history and has formed part of Greater London since 1965. Between 1981 and 1995 it was within the London Docklands Development Corporation area, which caused the population to increase as new homes were built and the Docklands Light Railway was constructed.

== History ==
=== Toponymy ===
Beckton is named after Simon Adams Beck, the governor of the Gas Light and Coke Company when work building Beckton Gas Works began in November 1868. The name New Beckton was used in 1881 for the workers estate at Cyprus.

=== Local government ===
Prior to industrialisation, the area that became Beckton was remote and unpopulated Thameside marshland, known as the East Ham Levels. Urban development took place in the south of the parish of East Ham, the part of the parish of Barking to the west of the River Roding and the part of Woolwich parish that was north of the River Thames. The western extremity was in the parish of West Ham. There was also a county boundary, with Barking, East Ham and West Ham in Essex and Woolwich in Kent. The whole area became part of the expanded Metropolitan Police District in 1840. Reflecting an increase in population and the need for more effective local government, local boards were formed for Woolwich in 1852, West Ham in 1856, East Ham in 1878 and Barking Town in 1882. The section in the detached part of Woolwich parish came within the Metropolitan Board of Works district in 1855 and in 1889 this area became the County of London under the control of the newly formed London County Council. The Barking Town and East Ham sections now came within the Essex County Council area, but West Ham instead formed a separate county borough because its population was high enough. East Ham was also elevated to this status in 1915. This continued until 1965 when the London Borough of Newham in Greater London was formed from territory that had been part of East Ham, West Ham, Barking and Woolwich. Beckton was within the London Docklands Development Corporation area from 1981 to 1995.

=== Beckton sewage works ===
Beckton Sewage treatment works were first established in 1864 as part of Joseph Bazalgette's scheme to remove sewage (and hence reduce disease) from London by creating two large sewers from the capital, one on each side of the Thames and known as the Southern and Northern Outfall Sewers. The Beckton sewage works (TQ448823), at the end of the northern outfall sewer, is Europe's 7th largest and is now managed by Thames Water. The outfall sewer has been landscaped and now also serves as the Greenway cycle track through east London.

The site was mooted in 2005 as the location for a desalination plant, but the proposal was rejected by Mayor Ken Livingstone as environmentally unacceptable. The scheme has been resurrected by the successive mayor, Boris Johnson, as part of a deal with Thames Water to reduce delays in fixing roadworks throughout London. The sewerage works has been expanded to handle the flow from the Thames Tideway Scheme.

=== Beckton gasworks ===
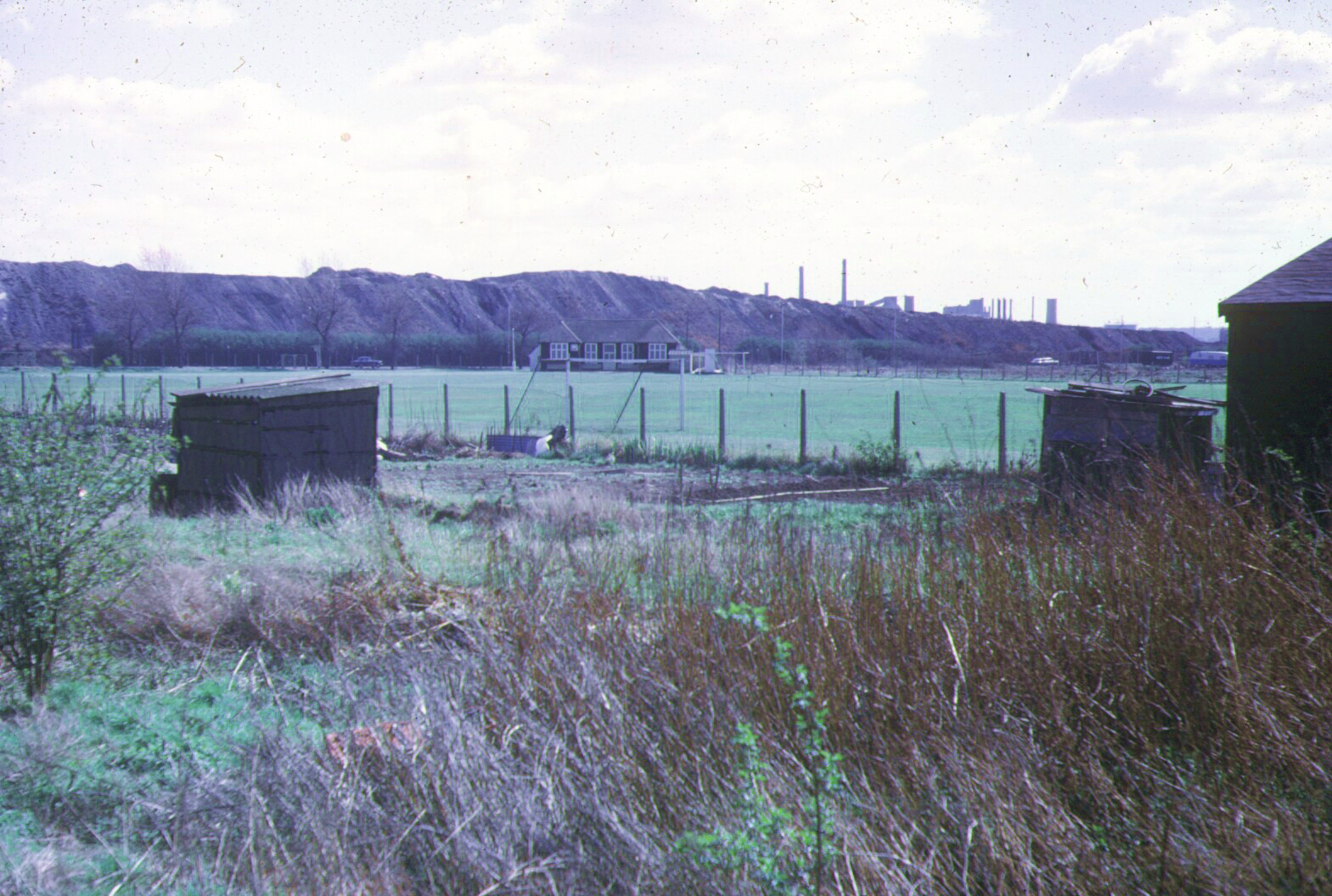
Beckton Alps and Gasworks 1973, from the A13

Situated north and east of the Royal Docks, the area was formerly heavily industrialised, and was the location of Beckton Gas Works, the largest gasworks in Europe, which served the capital. An adjacent by-products works also produced a wide variety of products including ink, dyes, mothballs, and fertilisers, all by-products of the process of turning coal to coke in the production of town gas. Britain converted from town gas to North Sea natural gas over the period 1966–77 and the Beckton gasworks were closed in 1976.

An extensive toxic spoil-heap from the Gasworks was known ironically as "Beckton Alps". Originally running from the Northern outfall sewer south to Winsor Terrace, this was landscaped in the 1980s. Part became a 25-metre-high (82 ft) Artificial ski slope for a time, opened by Diana, Princess of Wales, with a viewing platform at the summit and a Swiss-style bar at the foot. However, the site is now derelict.

=== Urban development ===
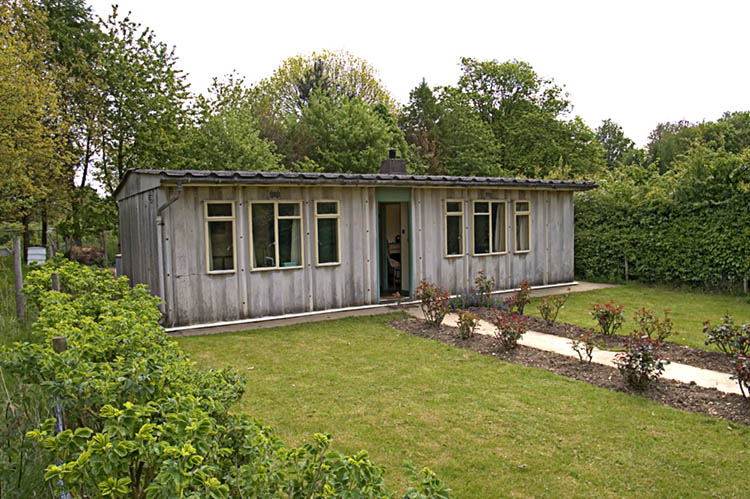
Prefabricated post-war home at Chiltern Open Air Museum: Universal House, steel frame clad with corrugated asbestos cement

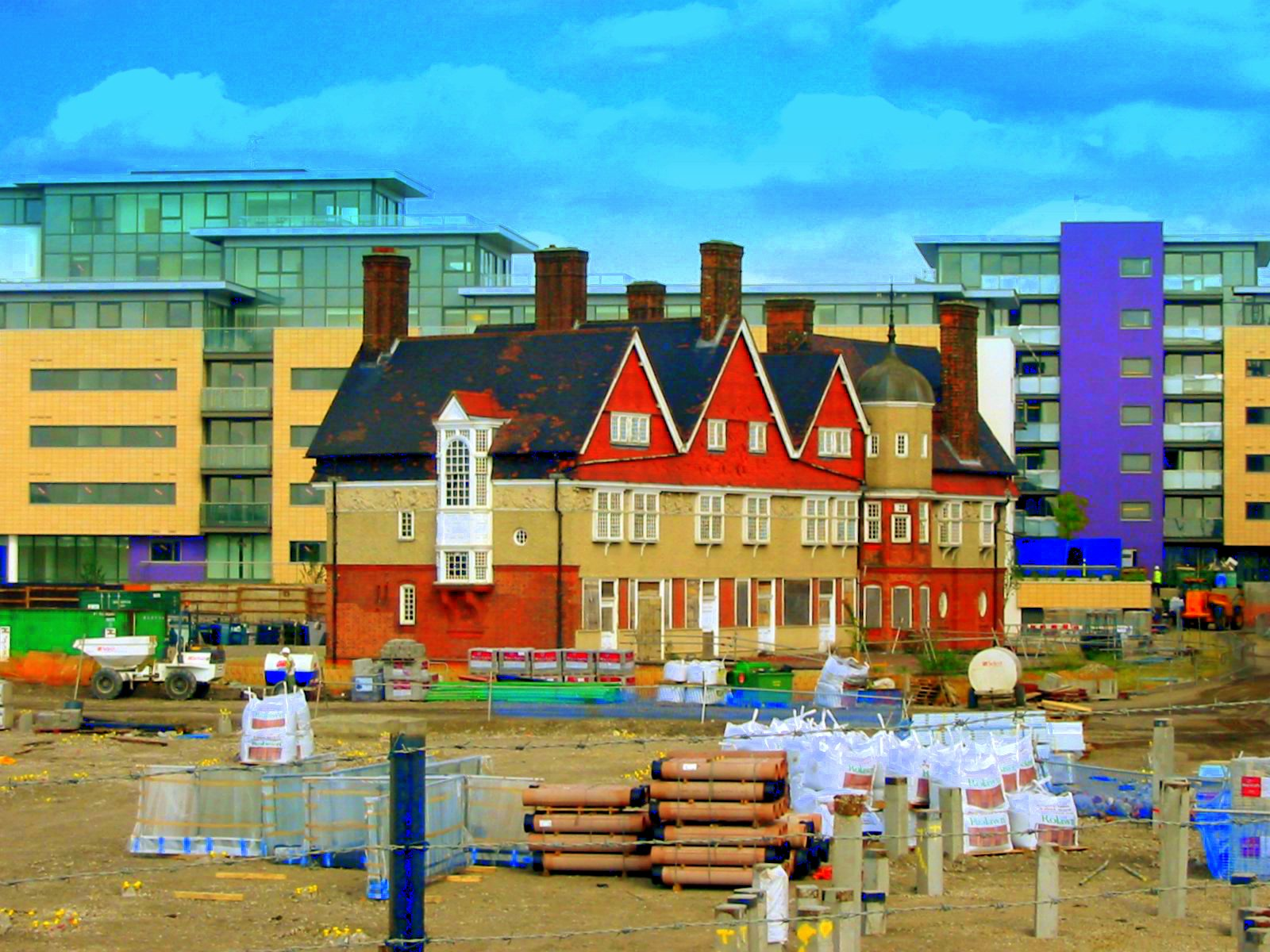
Gallions Hotel, Beckton

Beckton railway station opened in 1874 as the eastern terminus of a branch from Custom House.

Immediately after the Second World War, large numbers of prefabs were built in Beckton to house those made homeless by the war. The prefab-lined streets were all named after well-known generals and war heroes, but in the redevelopment of North Beckton in the 1980s, these were all swept away with the exception of Eisenhower Drive.

Containerisation during the 1960s, and the development of the docks at Tilbury, released all the land from the Thames up to the A13 which had been earmarked for a new, North Albert Dock. The original District Plan envisaged a large Council-owned estate, and major infrastructure works—including a huge drainage scheme with pumping stations—were put in place. However, following the creation of the London Docklands Development Corporation, much of the land was sold off resulting in today's blend of largely private housing.

In more recent times, industry has left the area, leaving huge areas of brownfield land, and Beckton has been redeveloped as part of the Docklands project. It now comprises mainly housing and several out-of-town shopping centres, and the architecture is mostly post-1982. Small areas of Victorian housing survive in Winsor Terrace, originally built as accommodation for Gas Light and Coke Company staff, and in the 'Nottingham' estate off Prince Regent Lane. It is served by local buses and Beckton DLR station, which acts as the terminus of the DLR's Beckton branch.

Beckton absorbed the localities of Cyprus and Winsor Park, which was built in the 1870s to house gasworks employees. Several original properties survive on Winsor Terrace, with two-up-two-downs for the workers and generously proportioned end-of-terrace houses for foremen. North Beckton, bordering the northern end of Woolwich Manor Way, was mostly built up in the late 1980s with a network of short streets, even shorter cul-de-sacs and dinky homes, many built as part of social housing schemes.

In the early 21st century, Beckton burgeons south and further east, towards Gallions Reach, being an essential part of the Thames Gateway. "Gallions Hotel", part of the Furlong City development by the lock that links the Royal Docks to the Thames, was formerly a rail terminus which connected with passenger ships leaving for all parts of the British Empire. Many colonial officials and their families spent their last night in Britain in the Gallions Hotel, which was mentioned by Rudyard Kipling in his novel, The Light That Failed.

In 2003, the largest Shopping Park in London, Gallions Reach was built. There are another three retail parks in the area; Beckton Triangle Retail Park, Beckton Gateway and Beckton Retail Park.

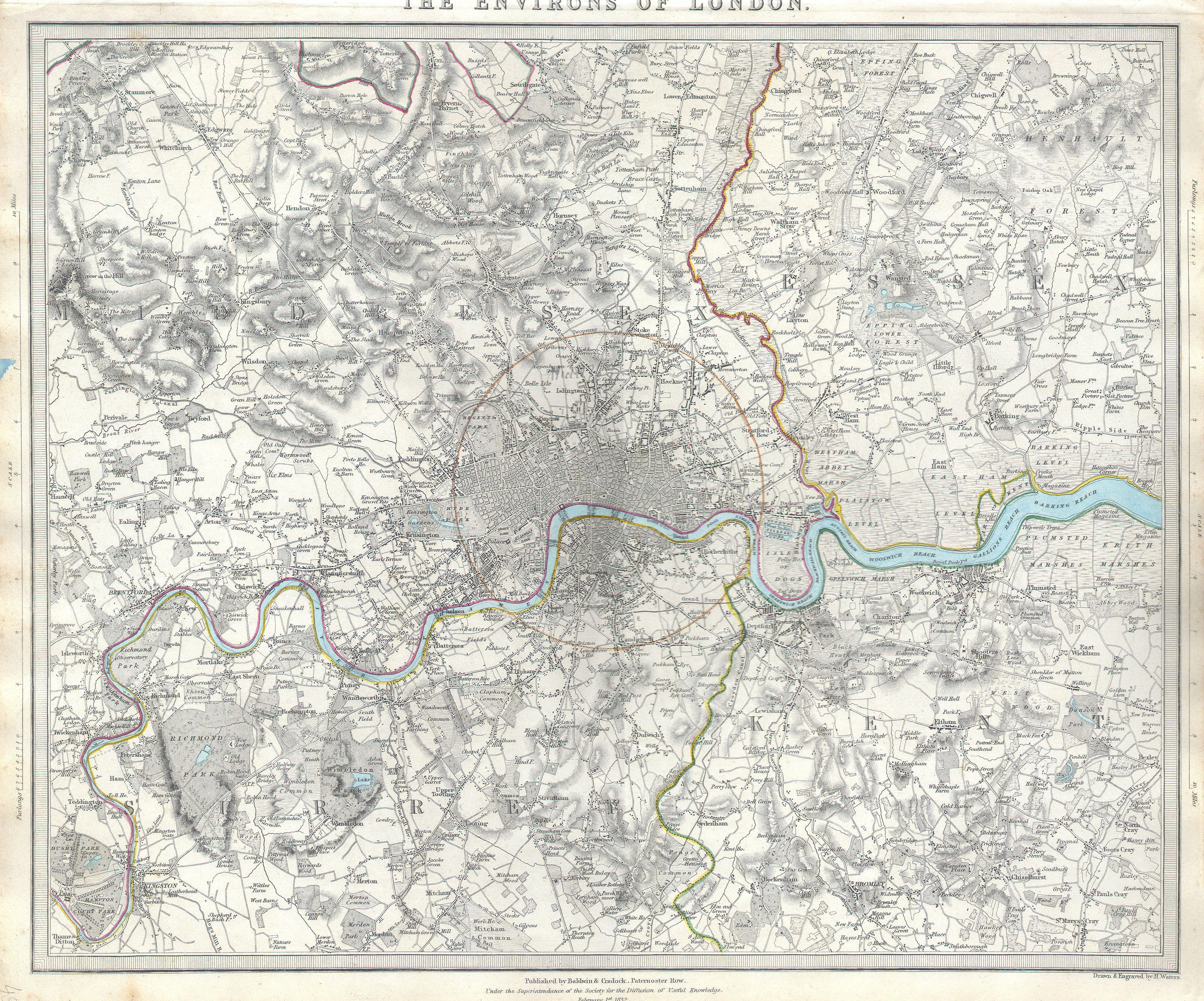
1832

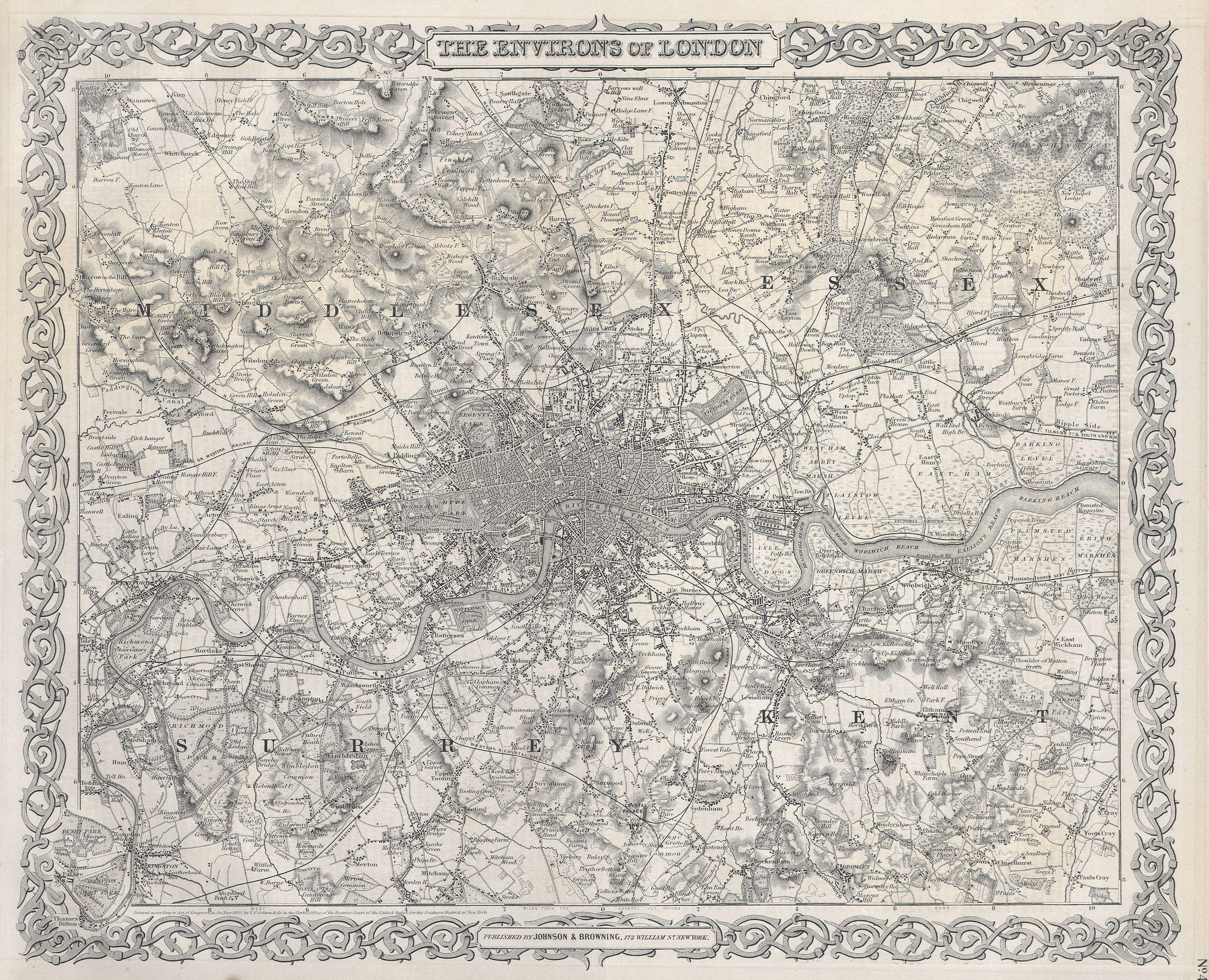
1855

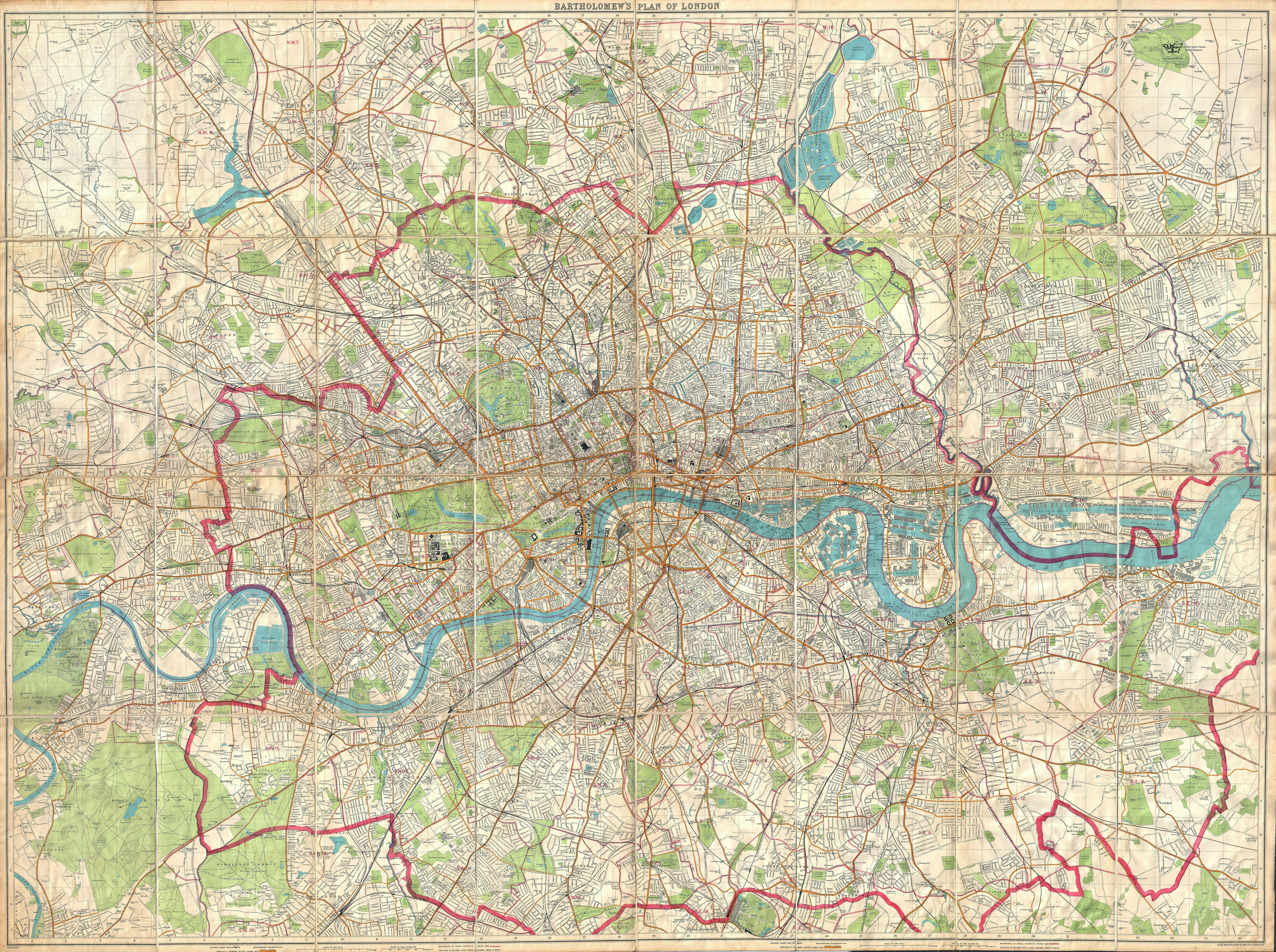
1899

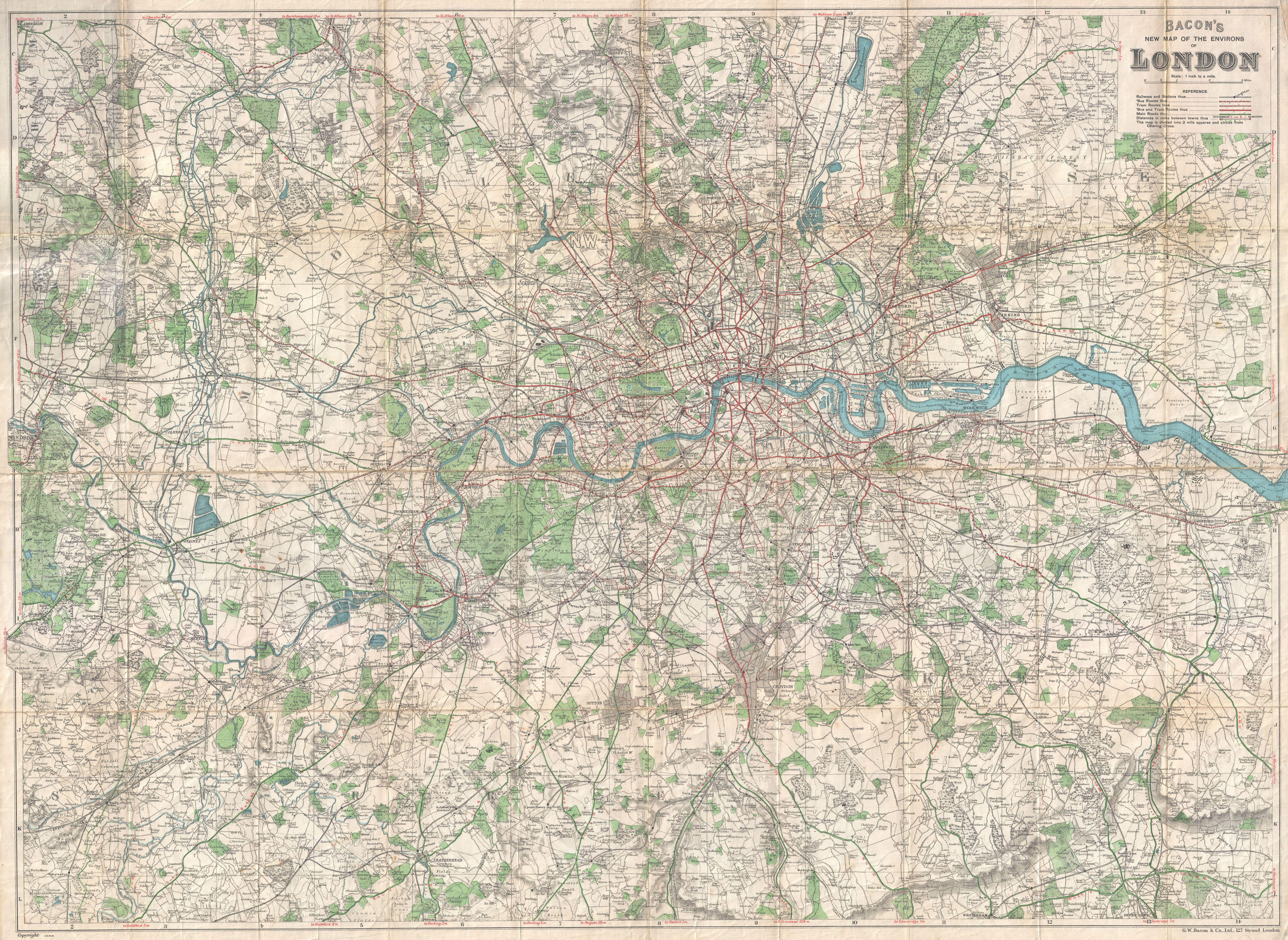
1920

== Geography ==
Its boundaries are the A13 trunk road to the north, Barking Creek to the east, the Royal Docks and North Woolwich to the south, and Prince Regent Lane to the west. The area around Prince Regent Lane is also known as Custom House. Modern Beckton is divided into East Beckton, Mid Beckton, North Beckton, West Beckton, South Beckton and Cyprus (named after the British capture of Cyprus from the Ottoman Empire in 1878, which occurred as the original estate was being built).

Beckton is at the western end of the London Riverside redevelopment zone of the Thames Gateway. Transport for London is planning a new bridge, the Gallions Reach Crossing, which will connect Beckton to Thamesmead on the southern bank of the River Thames.

== Demographics ==
Beckton is home to a significant Lithuanian community, which has led to the area being dubbed as Bektoniškės or "Little Lithuania". As many as 8,000 Lithuanians are estimated to have settled in Beckton following an increase in mobility for Lithuanian nationals across the European Union in 2007.

== Transport ==
There are Docklands Light Railway services from Beckton Bus Station to Canning Town Bus Station, Stratford International Bus Station and Tower Gateway DLR Station. There are a number of stations serving Beckton DLR Station, Beckton Bus Station. The nearest Docklands Light Railway station is Beckton for Mid and North Beckton; Cyprus for Cyprus area; Beckton Park for South Beckton and Royal Albert for West Beckton. Beckton is near the London City Airport and Woolwich. Beckton is served by many Transport for London bus services connecting it with areas including Barking Station, Beckton Bus Station, Beckton DLR Station, Beckton Triangle Retail Park, Canning Town Station, Canning Town Bus Station, Canning Town DLR Station, Central London, Chadwell Heath TFL Station, Dagenham, East Ham, Gallions Reach Shopping Park, Ilford, London City Airport, Manor Park, North Woolwich, Royal Albert, Stratford and Wanstead

Buses

The area is served by TfL bus services 101, 104, 129, 173, 262, 300, 366, 376, 474, 673, 678; and night bus N551.

Routes 101, 104, 173, 366, 376, 673 and 678 terminate inside the bus station while routes 129, 262, 300, 474 and N551 go past the station.

Buses at this station go as far as Wanstead, Canning Town, Stratford, Goodmayes, East Ham, Manor Park, Plaistow, Royal Albert, Chadwell Heath, Upton Park, Barking, Ilford, Loxford Estate, Redbridge, Dagenham, Gallions Reach and North Woolwich.

=== Beckton bus station ===
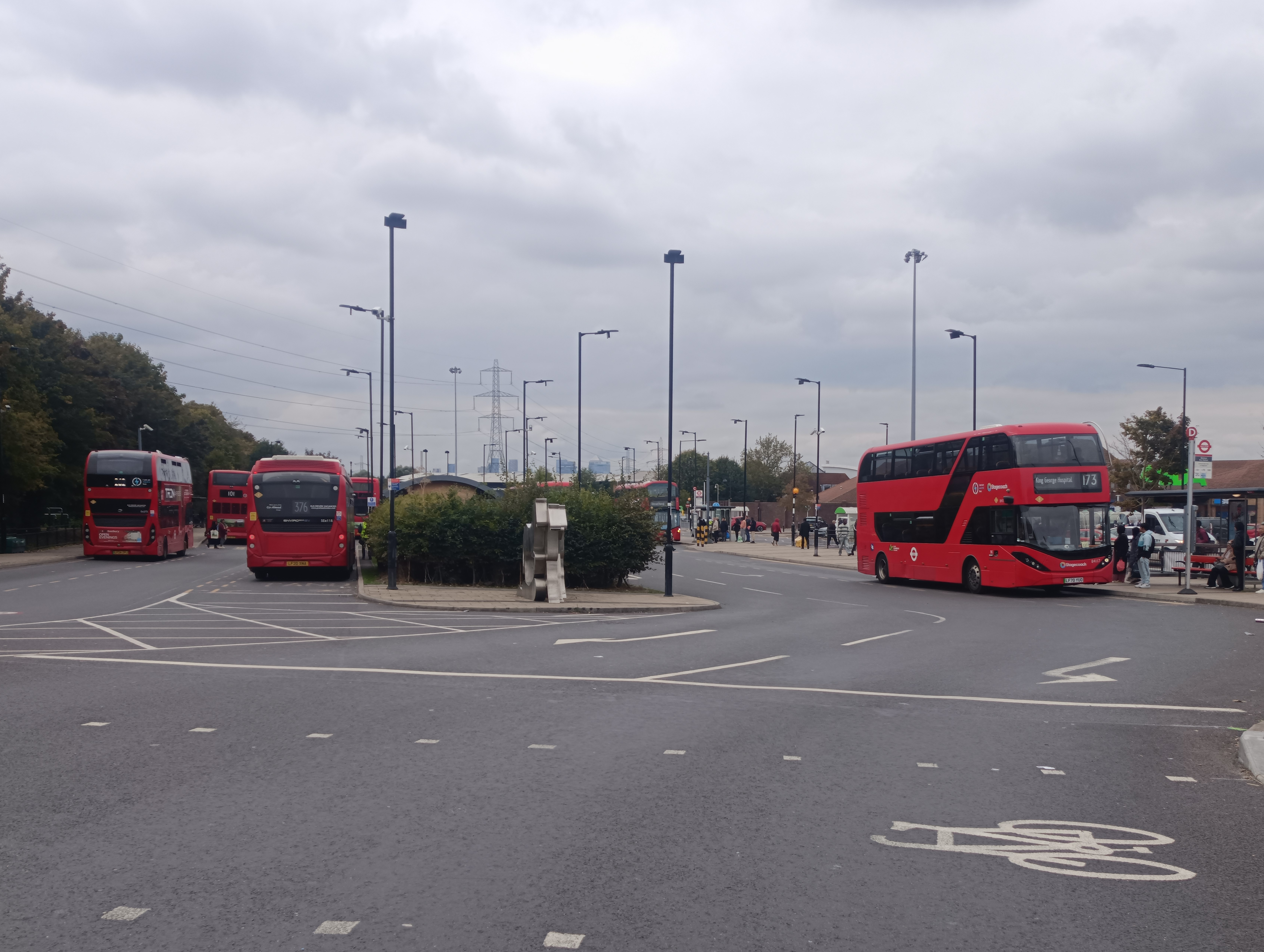
The bus station in 2025

Beckton is a London Buses bus station in the neighbourhood of Beckton, east London. The station is owned and maintained by Transport for London.

== Culture and community ==
The Gasworks were still extant—although derelict—in the early 1980s, when Stanley Kubrick's team came scouting for an area that could double for the battle scenes in his 1987 film, Full Metal Jacket. The Gasworks rough concrete structures were painted with Vietnamese script, and then strategically dynamited so as to resemble war-torn Huế. Retail parks now cover most of the Gasworks site.

Other notable films shot in and around the Beckton area during the 1980s included the 1981 James Bond film, For Your Eyes Only, which featured extensive aerial views of the Gasworks in the pre-credit sequence. Beckton was also used as a location in Michael Radford's 1984 feature film adaptation of George Orwell's Nineteen Eighty-Four—the Gasworks served as the setting for Orwell's "Proletarian Zones".

The video for Loop's 1990 single 'Arc-lite' was filmed on the set of Full Metal Jacket, as was the video for the 1997 Oasis single, "D'You Know What I Mean?"

Andrew Birkin's 1990 film of Ian McEwan's novel, The Cement Garden, was also filmed in Beckton and starred Charlotte Gainsbourg. In several scenes of The Cement Garden, aircraft can be heard taxiing at the nearby London City Airport. Winsor House, which served as the backdrop to the film was later demolished and the Winsor House Hotel stands there now.

In the opening minutes of the 2007 Simon Pegg film Hot Fuzz, the Tate & Lyle factory, Silvertown, and the City Airport aprons can be seen through the window blinds of Building 1000.

Footballer Jermain Defoe was born in Beckton. Defoe has said Beckton has "made him the man he is today". On 13 February 2006 Jermain Defoe scored his 100th Premier League goal against Charlton. He celebrated making a "B" sign with his hands to commemorate Beckton.

On 14 May 2010 Beckton was the location of a terrorist attack on local Member of Parliament Stephen Timms. He was approached by 21-year-old Islamist Roshonara Choudhry during his constituency surgery at the Beckton Globe library and stabbed twice in an attempted assassination. Timms survived the attack and the perpetrator was jailed for life.

== Education ==
The University of East London Docklands Campus is a campus of the University of East London (UEL) situated in the Docklands area of east London in the Cyprus area of Beckton. The campus opened in 1999. It is one of three UEL campuses, the others being the Stratford Campus and the new University Square Stratford location.

Kingsford Community School is a secondary school located close to Beckton DLR. It opened in September 2000, and educates full-time children from the ages of 11 to 16.
