= Custom House station =

Railway and DLR station in London

Custom House
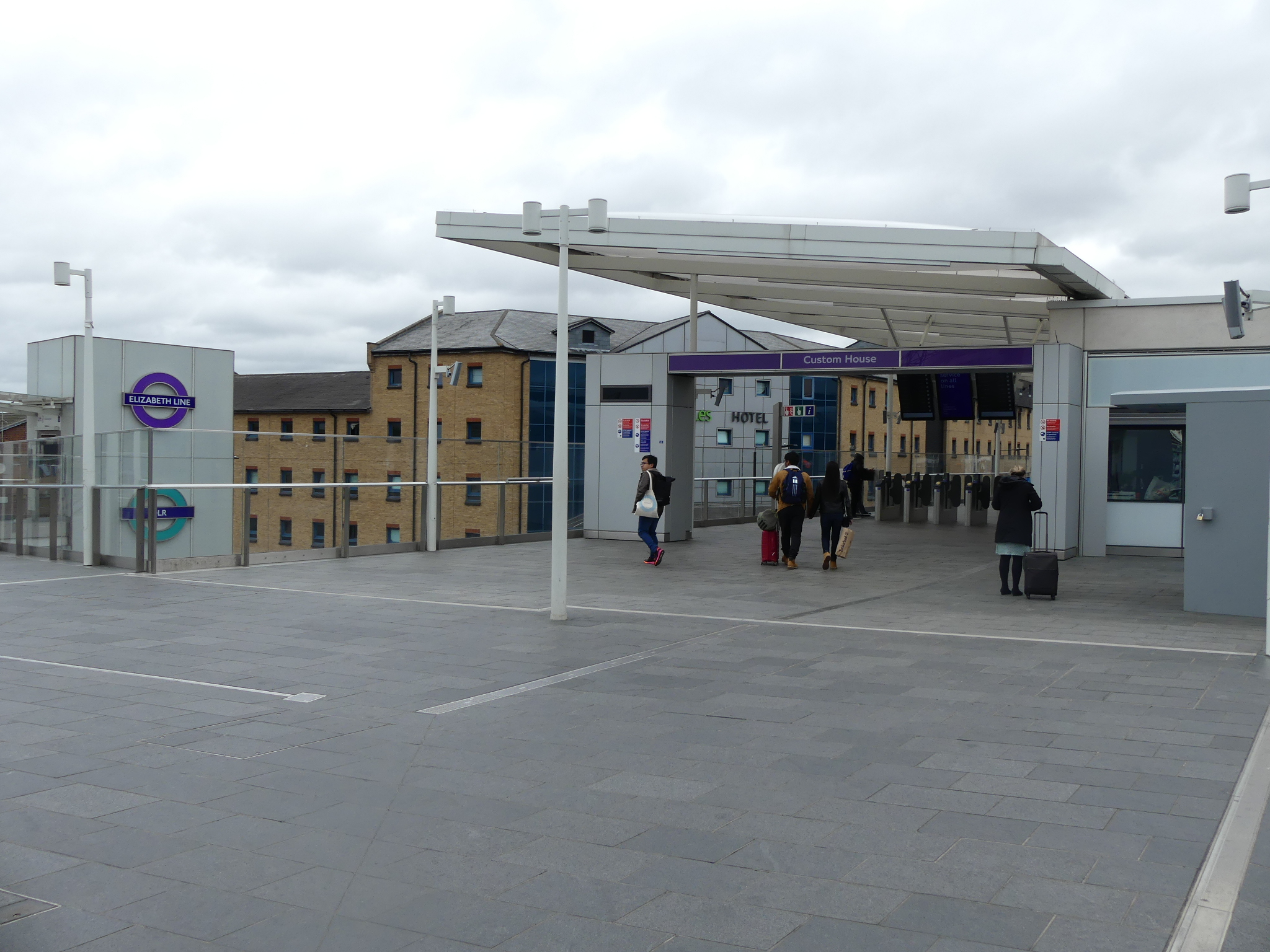
- Elizabeth line station entrance seen in May 2022
- Interactive map of Custom House

General information
- Location: Custom House
- Local authority: London Borough of Newham
- Managed by: Transport for London
- Owner: Transport for London
- Station code: CUS
- Number of platforms: 4
- Fare zone: 3

DLR annual boardings and alightings
- 2021: ▲2.065 million
- 2022: ▲3.650 million
- 2023: ▲5.070 million
- 2024: ▼4.18 million
- 2025: ▼3.80 million

National Rail annual entry and exit
- 2022–23: 5.272 million
- 2023–24: ▲9.238 million
- 2024–25: ▲9.795 million

Railway companies
- Original company: Eastern Counties Railway
- Pre-grouping: Great Eastern Railway
- Post-grouping: London and North Eastern Railway

Key dates
- 26 November 1855: Opened
- 28 March 1994: DLR service added
- 9 December 2006: North London Line service withdrawn
- 24 May 2022: Elizabeth line opened

Other information
- External links: Departures; Facilities
- Coordinates: 51.50990°N 0.02660°E

Custom House is an interchange station by the Royal Docks, in Custom House in the London Borough of Newham, London for Docklands Light Railway (DLR) – on which it is branded Custom House for ExCeL – and Elizabeth line services. It is situated in London fare zone 3. It takes its name from the old Custom House, which formerly stood nearby, and ExCeL London which it serves.

It is adjacent to the site of an older Custom House station built by the Eastern Counties Railway in 1855 and closed in 2006. These were replaced by new Elizabeth line platforms, which opened on 24 May 2022, along with the rest of the central section. As a result of the Crossrail project, the Custom House DLR station was closed from February 2017 until 7 January 2018.

== History ==
=== Heavy rail station ===
The original Custom House station was opened in 1855, by the Eastern Counties Railway (ECR) on the Eastern Counties and Thames Junction Railway (ECTJR) line which was built to link the Eastern Counties Railway at Stratford with the developing London docks of the mid-nineteenth century. The ECTJR was formally absorbed by the ECR in 1847.

By the 1860s the railways in East Anglia were in financial trouble, and most were leased to the ECR; they wished to amalgamate formally, but could not obtain government agreement for this until 1862, when the Great Eastern Railway was formed by amalgamation. Thus Custom House became a GER station in 1862.

On 14 October 1872 a branch to Beckton Gas Works opened to freight, the line diverging just to the east of the station. Passenger services commenced 17 March 1874 generally running from Stratford (Low Level platforms) or Stratford Market stations.

On 3 August 1880 the branch to Gallions was opened by the London and Saint Katharine Docks Company although initially trains terminated at Central before being extended to Gallions in November of that year. The dock company acquired three former London & North Western Railway 2-4-0T locomotives to operate a shuttle service between Custom House and Gallions.

The station was situated between housing to the north and exchange sidings for the dock system to the south (which opened in 1877). It was rebuilt in 1891 and was a three platform affair with a bay platform at the east end for Gallions Branch services. The station building was on the north side of the line and linked to the southbound platform by a footbridge. There was a shelter on the up platform and a signal box at the east end of the station.

Following the Railway Grouping of 1923 Custom House station became part of the London and North Eastern Railway. During the Second World War the station was bombed in the London Blitz on 7 September 1940. The Gallions and Beckton branches were also heavily bombed and the passenger service was withdrawn at this time.

Following nationalisation in 1948 Custom House became part of British Railways (Eastern Region). Passenger numbers fell during the 1950s and 1960s as the docks declined and car ownership grew. Eventually the service was reduced to a shuttle between Stratford (Low Level) platforms and North Woolwich generally operated by two car DMUs. In 1969 the station building was demolished and replaced by a shelter.

In 1978 it was announced a new Crosstown Linkline service would be operated linking North Woolwich, Custom House and Stratford to Camden Road and this commenced on 14 May 1979. The line was electrified by British Rail and from 13 May 1985 the Crosstown Linkline diesel service was replaced with electric through running from Richmond to North Woolwich, which replaced the Richmond–Broad Street service.

In 1986 the line became part of Network SouthEast. Following privatisation of the railways in 1994 the track through Custom House became the responsibility of Railtrack whilst train operations became the part of North London Railways (part of National Express) on 3 March 1997. This company was re-branded as Silverlink in September of that year. In 2002 following financial difficulties at Railtrack, Network Rail took over responsibility for the operation of the infrastructure around the station.

The original Custom House station was closed on Saturday 9 December 2006 along with Silvertown and North Woolwich. The area was by now well served by the Docklands Light Railway and this was also due to take over the track bed of the old ECTJR up to Stratford railway station.

=== Custom House Engine Shed ===
This engine shed was located to the east of the station and on the south side of the line. The three track engine shed was built in 1881 by the London and Saint Katharine Docks Company after a fire had destroyed an earlier wooden structure.

Early locomotives tended to be a series of second hand locomotives including some from the London and North Western Railway which tended to work passenger services on the Gallions branch and would have been seen at the GER station. The main duties undertaken by the shed's locomotives were shunting the various sidings, wharves and factories around the Victoria and Albert docks.

In 1889 the shed passed to the London and India Docks Joint Committee following the merger of some of the dock companies. The dock company's locomotives stopped working passenger services on the Gallions Branch from 1903 and services were then worked by the GER although occasionally Custom House locomotives did help out.

Six years later in 1909 the remaining dock companies were all merged under the umbrella of the Port of London Authority who became responsible for the operation of the shed and rail network in the docks. From time to time shunting locomotives from the Great Eastern (later LNER and British Railway) shed as Stratford were hired in to cover shortages.

By the mid-1920s the locomotive stock allocated to Custom House consisted of:

- Seven Robert Stephenson 0-6-0STs
- Two Manning Wardle 0-6-0STs
- Six Andrew Barclay 0-6-0Ts
- Seventeen Hudswell Clarke 0-6-0Ts

The first diesel engines (from the Yorkshire Engine Company) appeared in 1959 and a handful of steam engines were retained until 1963 (mainly for the banana traffic; the bananas were ripened en route by means of heating pipes in the vans, fed by steam from the locomotive). The reign of the diesels was short lived as the docks were in rapid decline and on 1 May 1970 the PLA system and Custom House shed closed.

=== Light rail station ===
In 1973 a government report on the redevelopment of London's Docklands proposed an extension of the unbuilt Fleet line from Charing Cross via Fenchurch Street to Beckton, with stations on each side at North Greenwich and Beckton. The proposal was developed during the 1970s as the Fleet line developed into the Jubilee line. The route was approved in 1980 with the main route running via Silvertown to Woolwich Arsenal and the Beckton route planned to operate as a shuttle service from Customs House. Financial constraints meant that the route was not proceeded with. By the start of the 1990s new plans had been developed to extend the Jubilee line on a route south of the River Thames towards Stratford.

The adjacent Docklands Light Railway (DLR) station opened on 28 March 1994 as part of the extension to Beckton.

== Today ==
=== Design ===
It is linked to the main entrance of the ExCeL Exhibition Centre by an overhead walkway, which also connects to the Royal Victoria Dock Bridge, spanning the Royal Victoria Dock to its southern side.

=== Location ===
It is the principal public transport access to the ExCeL Exhibition Centre and its adjacent complex of hotels, restaurants and bars.

== Services ==
=== Docklands Light Railway ===
The typical off-peak Docklands Light Railway service in trains per hour is:

- 12 tph to Canning Town of which 6 continue to Tower Gateway
- 12 tph to Beckton

Additional services call at the station during the peak hours, increasing the service to up to 16 tph in each direction.

=== Elizabeth line ===
Elizabeth line services at Custom House are operated using Class 345 EMUs.

The typical off-peak service in trains per hour is:

- 8 tph to Abbey Wood
- 4 tph to Maidenhead of which 2 continue to Reading
- 4 tph to Heathrow Terminal 4

Additional services call at the station during the peak hours, increasing the service to up to 12 tph in each direction.

Preceding station	DLR	Following station
Royal Victoria towards Tower Gateway	Docklands Light Railway	Prince Regent towards Beckton
Elizabeth line
Canary Wharf towards Reading or Heathrow Terminal 4	Elizabeth line	Woolwich towards Abbey Wood
	Disused railways	
Canning Town	Silverlink North London Line	Silvertown
Terminus	London and Saint Katharine Docks Company Gallions Branch	Connaught Road
	Abandoned Plans	
Preceding station	LUL	Following station
North Greenwich towards Stanmore	Jubilee line Phase 3 (1980); Never constructed	Beckton Terminus
North Greenwich towards Stanmore	Jubilee line Phase 3 (1980); Never constructed	Silvertown towards Woolwich Arsenal

== Connections ==
London Buses routes 147, 241, 300, 304, 325, 474, school route 678 and night route N551 serve the station.
