= Banyuetan =

Chinese semimonthly journal by Xinhua News Agency

- Categories: Politics
- Frequency: 10th and 25th of each month
- First issue: 1980
- Country: China
- Based in: Beijing
- Website: www.banyuetan.org
- ISSN: 1002-7335

Banyuetan
- Simplified Chinese: 半月谈
- Traditional Chinese: 半月談
Transcriptions
Standard Mandarin
- Hanyu Pinyin: Bànyuètán

Banyuetan is a semimonthly journal published by Xinhua News Agency. It is published on the 10th and 25th of each month.

In addition to Banyuetan (a semi-monthly magazine), the publications under the Banyetuan magazine also include Banyuetan Internal Edition (a monthly magazine, publicly distributed, not an internal reference), Current Affairs Information Handbook (a bi-monthly magazine), Pin Du (a monthly magazine), Uyghur and Tibetan versions of Banyuetan, Banyuetan website, Banyuetan online school, and Banyuetan public opinion survey center.

== History ==
On May 10, 1980, Xinhua News Agency, entrusted by the Publicity Department of the Chinese Communist Party, launched the semi-monthly magazine Banyuetan (Semi-Monthly Talk) in Beijing. The magazine was 32mo in size, 64 pages, and was printed and distributed simultaneously in Changchun, Jinan, Hefei, Nanjing, Shanghai, Fuzhou, Wuhan, Changsha, Chongqing, Kunming, Xi'an, Zhengzhou, and Ürümqi, in addition to Beijing. The initial motivation for launching Banyuetan was based on the Publicity Department's new requirements for Xinhua News Agency to strengthen the CCP's ideological and political work in the era of reform and opening up, necessitating the creation of a new type of Party journal specifically targeting grassroots groups.

In 1985, the circulation of Banyuetan reached 3.6 million, making it one of the largest-circulation current affairs periodicals in mainland China. After Deng Xiaoping's southern tour in 1992, Banyuetan was further revised and became one of the first CCP propaganda journals to be marketized. It was also used by the CCP as an important propaganda media during the reform and opening-up period. In 2009, Banyuetan was selected by the China World Records Association as the political journal with the largest circulation in China.
