= Royal Docks =

Area in Newham, London

Coordinates: 51.506661°N 0.04240°E

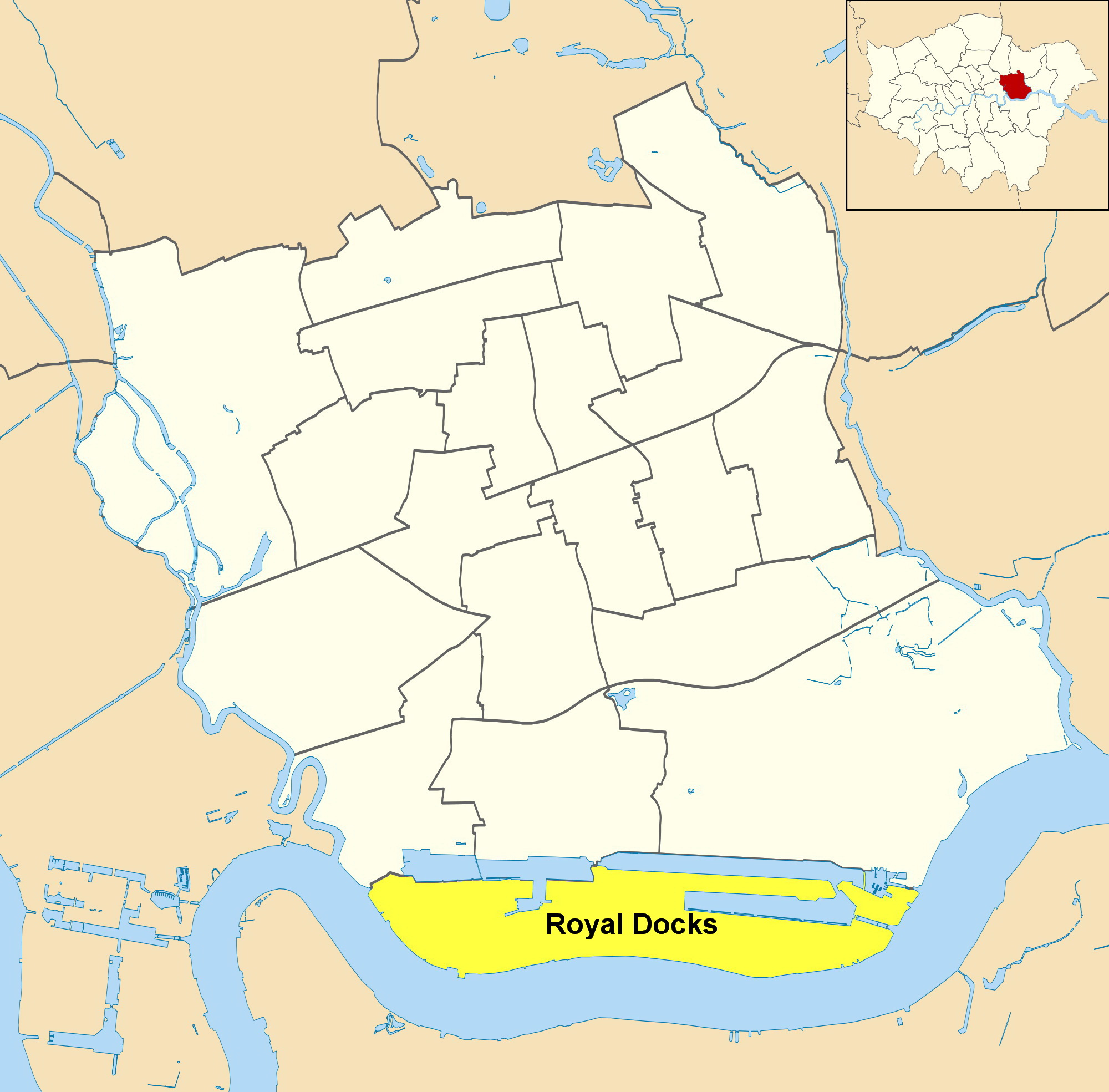
Ward map of Royal Docks within the London Borough of Newham

Royal Docks is an area in the London Borough of Newham in the London Docklands in East London, England.

The area is named after three docks – the Royal Albert Dock, the Royal Victoria Dock and the King George V Dock. They are more correctly called the Royal Group of Docks to distinguish them from the Royal Navy Dockyard, Royal being due to their naming after members of the royal family rather than Crown ownership. The three docks collectively formed the largest enclosed docks in the world, with a water area of nearly 250 acres (1.0 km^{2}) and an overall estate of 1,100 acres (4.5 km^{2}). The area was designated a special enterprise zone in 2012. North Woolwich is part of Royal Docks ward.

Royal Docks was also a ward of the London Borough of Newham, which at the 2011 Census had a population of 10,679. It was abolished for the 2022 elections and replaced by two new wards of Royal Albert and Royal Victoria.

== History ==
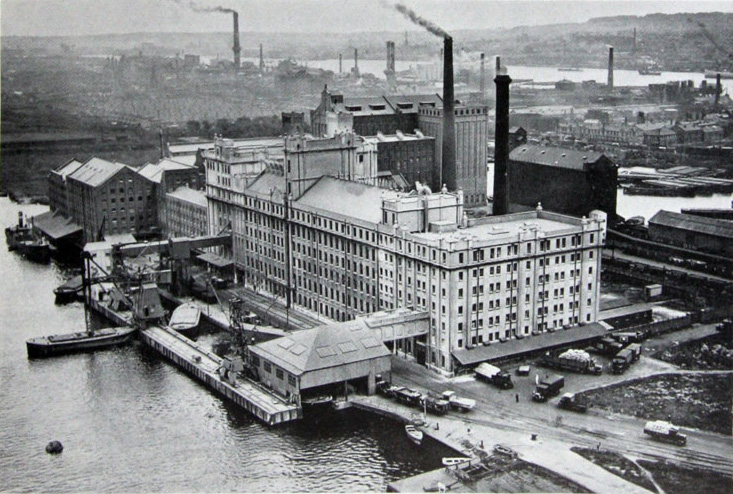
Spiller's Millennium Mills on the south side of the docks, 1934

The three docks were completed between 1855 and 1921 on riverside marshes in East Ham and West Ham (now the London Borough of Newham). The Victoria Dock was constructed by the Victoria (London) Dock Company, which became part of the London and Saint Katharine Docks Company in 1864. The London and Saint Katharine Docks Company then went on to build the Royal Albert Dock. Both docks were constructed to provide berths for large vessels that could not be accommodated further upriver. They were a great commercial success, becoming London's principal docks during the first half of the 20th century. They specialised particularly in the import and unloading of foodstuffs, with rows of giant granaries and refrigerated warehouses being sited alongside the quays. The docks' great size and provision of numerous finger quays gave them a collective span of over 12 miles (19.3 km) of quaysides, serving hundreds of cargo and passenger ships at a time. Following the opening of the Royal Albert Dock in 1880, giving the Royal Docks access to Gallions Reach, 11 miles (17.7 km) below London Bridge, the rival East and West India Dock Company responded with the construction of Tilbury Docks even further down river. The ruinous competition led eventually to all the enclosed docks being taken over by the Port of London Authority (PLA) in 1909. The PLA completed the King George V Dock in 1921 and reserved land to the north for a fourth dock, never built.

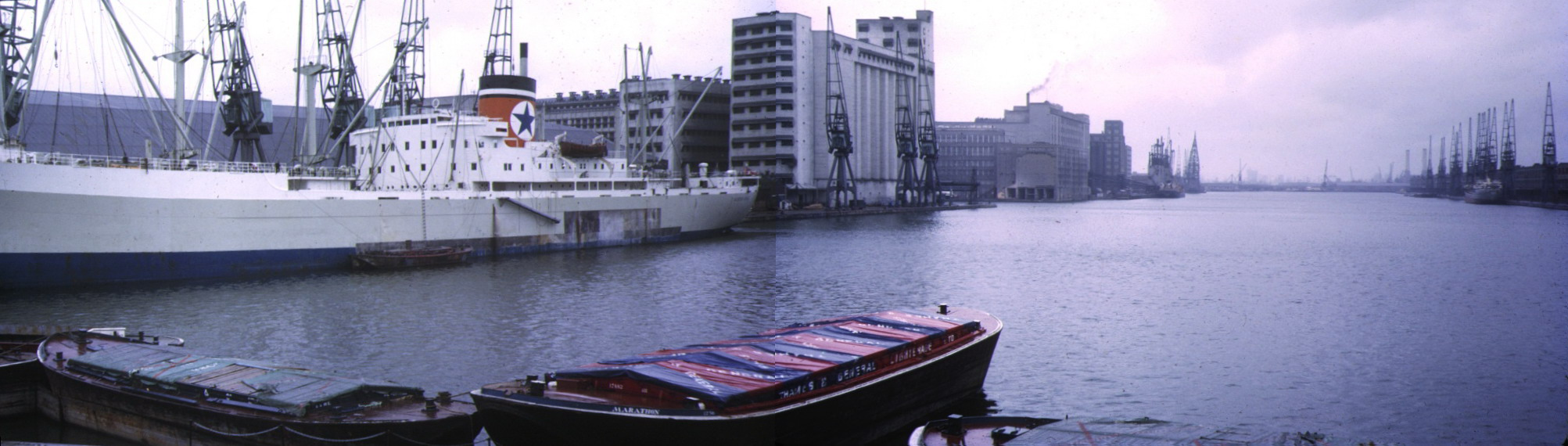
The Victoria dock in 1973

The General Strike of 1926 hit the Royal Docks hard, with 750,000 frozen carcasses threatened by the docks' electrical supply being cut off. The Royal Navy saved the day for the dock owners by connecting the generators of two submarines to power the warehouses' freezers.

Although the Royal Docks suffered severe damage from German bombing in World War II, they recovered after the war but suffered a steady decline from the 1960s onwards, following the adoption of containerization. Nonetheless, they survived longer than any of the other upstream docks, finally closing to commercial traffic only in 1981. The docks' closure led to high levels of unemployment and social deprivation in the surrounding communities of North Woolwich and Silvertown.

== Redevelopment ==
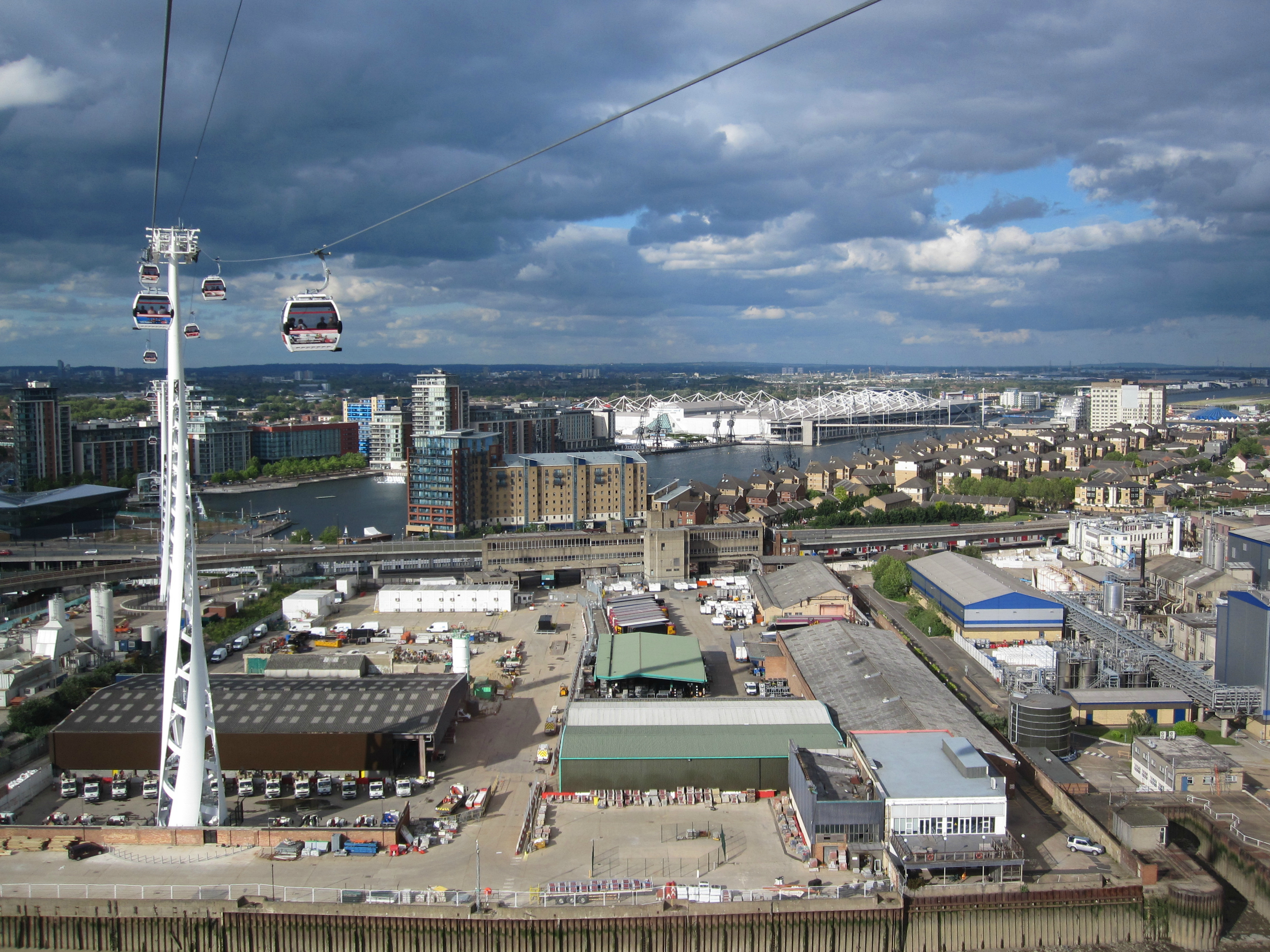
Aerial view of the docks from the London Cable Car with the ExCeL Centre in 2012

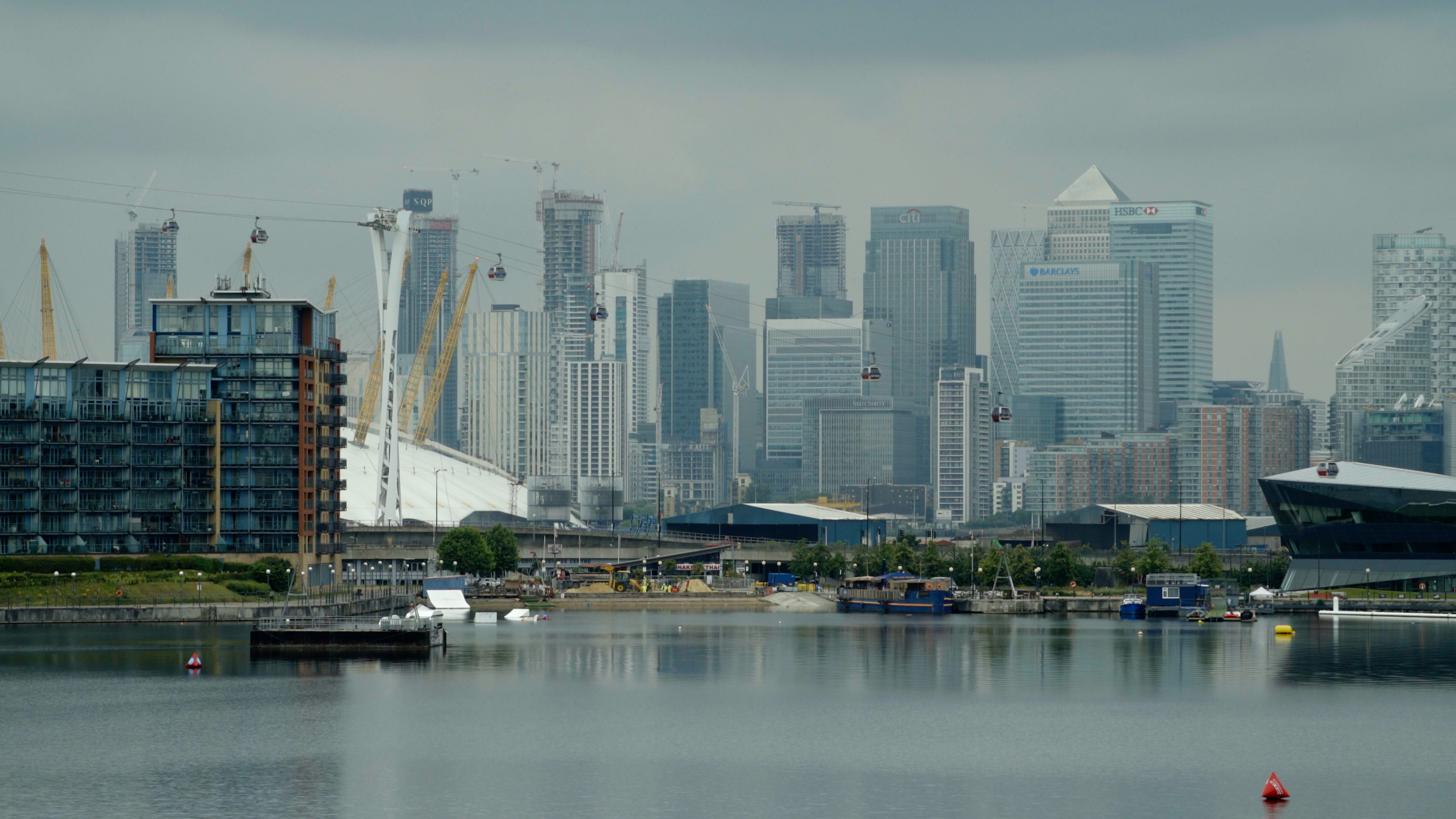
Looking west from the Royal Docks in 2019

Because of their relative remoteness from central London and poor transport links, the redevelopment of London's Docklands has proceeded more slowly in the Royals than in the other former docks. The London Docklands Development Corporation undertook much work during the 1980s and 1990s to improve local transport and promote new residential and commercial developments in the area. Thousands of new homes were built at Beckton, just north of the Royal Docks.

An extension of the Docklands Light Railway (DLR) opened in 1994 to provide direct links to the City of London and Canary Wharf. This was later extended round the south side of the docks with the link to London City Airport opening in December 2005. The line was later extended to Woolwich. Crossrail has served the area since 2022.

Several other major projects have been proposed or implemented since then. Many residential complexes have been built; most notably the architecturally progressive Eastern Quay on the south side of Royal Victoria Dock, Capital East on the north side of the dock and the large complex of Gallion's Reach in the extreme east of the Royal Docks. A series of major developments have seen the construction of a new university campus (for the University of East London) and the ExCeL Exhibition Centre, among much else. The Royal Docks have also seen the development of London City Airport (code LCY), opened in 1988 on the quay between the Royal Albert Dock and the King George V dock. While the docks themselves have been preserved largely intact, little remains of the old infrastructure, although some historic warehouses and cranes have been preserved.

In 2011 the 125 hectares (310 acres) Royal Docks were granted Enterprise Zone status to help attract jobs and businesses to the area.

In 2014, Singapore-listed Oxley Holdings and developer Ballymore UK set up a joint venture to develop Royal Wharf, with 3,385 new homes housing over 10,000 people, plus shops, restaurants and offices. The final phase, Mariner's Quarter, has the tallest building standing at 19 storeys, overlooking the Thames and Canary Wharf.

In March 2023, consultants unveiled proposals to use floating modules to create additional dockspace area that could be used to host Formula One motor racing events on a circuit incorporating 2.7km of the existing embankment along the Royal Victoria and Royal Albert Dock from ExCeL to the University of East London.

In July 2026, Dubai-based developer Arada unveiled its £2.5bn, 5,000 home Thameside West regeneration plans, including a new DLR station, aiming to start construction at the western extremity of the Royal Docks in early 2028.

== Transport ==
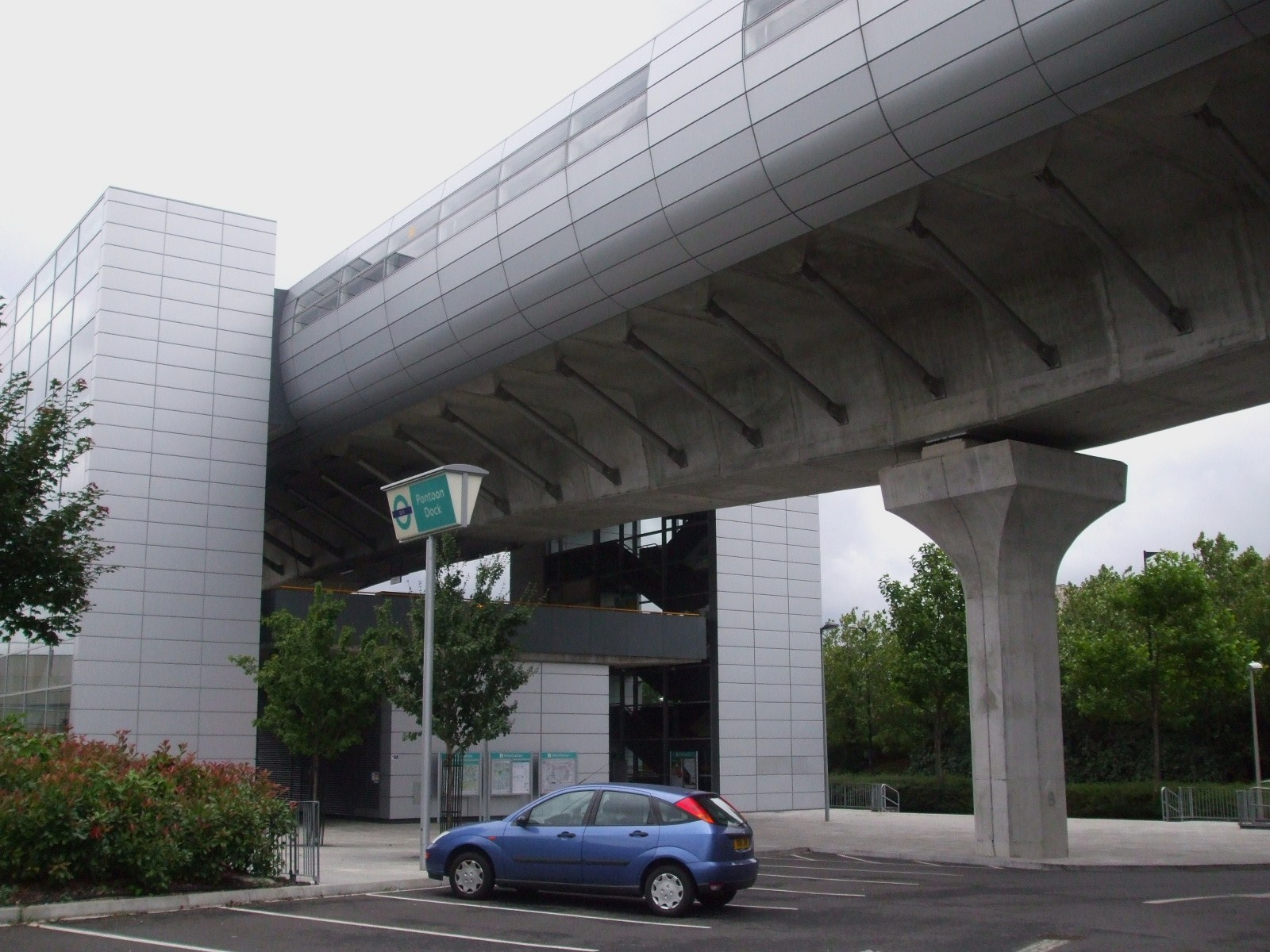
The Docks are served principally by the DLR

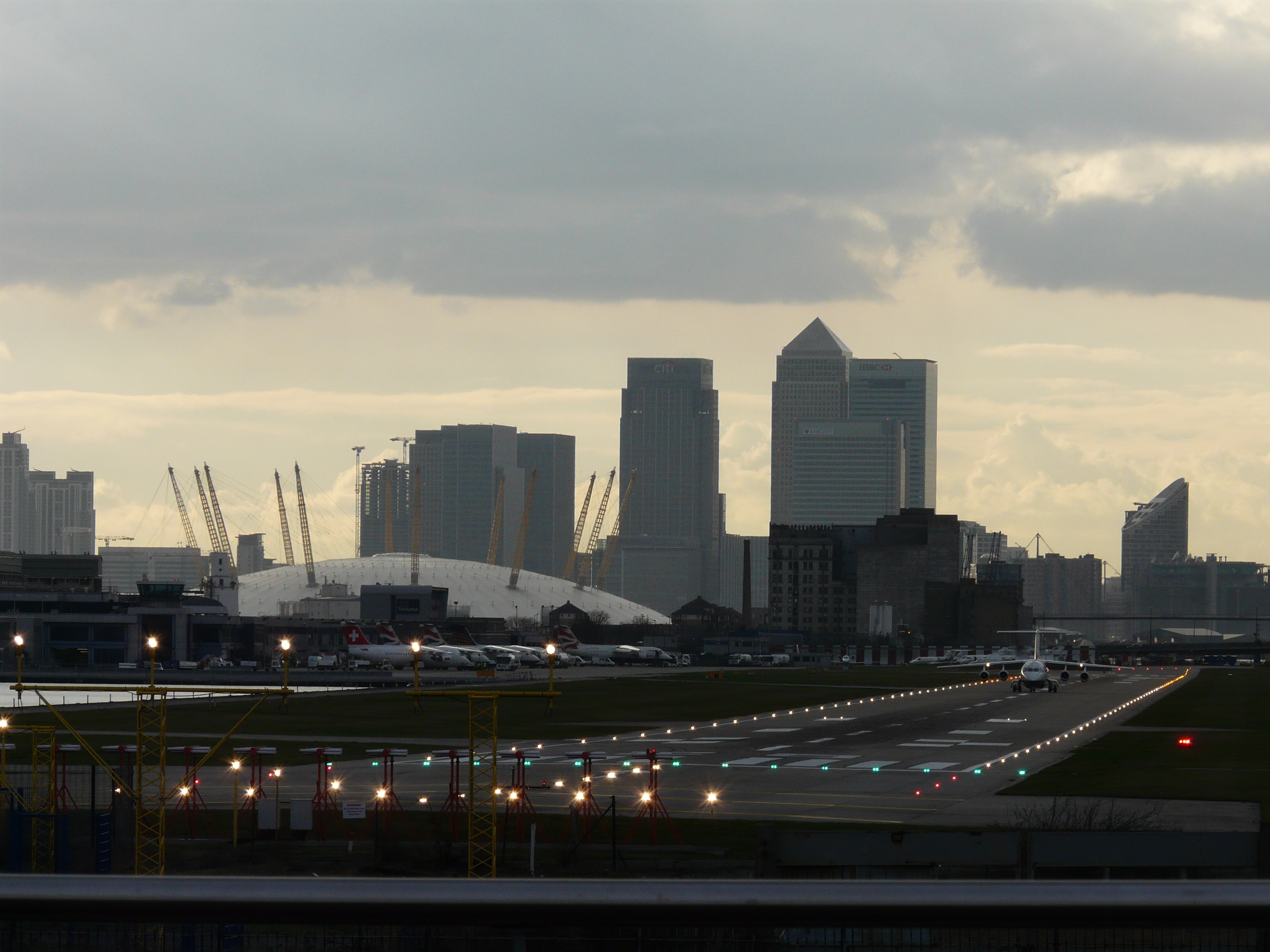
London City Airport, in the heart of the Docks, has been open since 1988

Aside from local bus routes, the area is primarily served by the DLR which goes from Canning Town (services west to Canary Wharf and Central London, and North to Stratford) along the north of the dock to Beckton, and along the south of the dock to North Woolwich and under the Thames to Woolwich Arsenal. Transport for London plan to extend the Beckton branch to Dagenham but this is dependent on funding. The DLR replaced the North London Line services that previously served the area from Canning Town to North Woolwich via Custom House and the 600 m Connaught tunnel beneath the docks.

From 2022, a branch of the Elizabeth line passes beneath the Royal Docks between Canning Town and Woolwich in a tunnel, serving Custom House station, with future provision for a station at Silvertown. Crossrail reuses the southern part of the former North London Line alignment from Custom House to North Woolwich (including the Connaught tunnel built in 1878).

There has also been a need for a further river crossing in the area. A long-standing proposal has been for a four-lane tolled bridge providing a road link between Beckton and Thamesmead on the south bank: the Thames Gateway Bridge. A public inquiry on the bridge closed in May 2006, it being particularly contentious in the residential neighbourhoods between Plumstead and the Danson Interchange (a junction on the A2). The plans were shelved, along with the DLR Dagenham extension, by then Mayor of London Boris Johnson when he came to power in 2008. However, in the run-up to the 2012 election, Johnson started to push for a crossing at Silvertown (the western end of the docks), now the location of the Silvertown Tunnel.

The Royal Docks is also home to London City Airport, between the northern and southern docks. It was opened in 1988 to serve the Canary Wharf development. It is closer to central London than Heathrow, and is served by a dedicated DLR station. In 2010, London City was the fifth busiest airport in terms of passengers and aircraft movements serving the London area.

== Navigation ==
Although the docks are now closed for commercial shipping, most of the water area of the docks still exists and is still navigable by craft of all sizes up to and including sizeable ships. The docks' principal use is now water sports, but they do see occasional visits by naval and merchant vessels, especially during the annual London Boat Show and the biennial DSEi arms fair, both of which are held at the ExCeL Exhibition Centre. Cruise ships including Fred Olsen Lines' Braemar (24,300 GT) were moored there during the London 2012 Olympics.

The management of the water areas of the Royal Docks, including locks and bridges, is now the responsibility of Royal Docks Management Authority Limited (RoDMA), which is owned and funded by the owners of the surrounding development land.

== See also ==
- Royal Docks Heritage Railway
