= London and Saint Katharine Docks Company =

The London and Saint Katharine Docks Company was formed in 1864 by the merger of the London Dock Company and the Saint Katharine Dock Company.

== History ==
=== London Dock Company ===
The London Dock Company was created by the Port of London Improvement Act 1800 (39 & 40 Geo. 3. c. xlvii).

=== Saint Katharine Dock Company ===
The Saint Katharine Dock Company was created by the St. Katharine's Dock Act 1825 (6 Geo. 4. c. cv). The docks opened in 1828.

=== Victoria (London) Dock Company ===
The Victoria (London) Dock Company was created by the Victoria (London) Dock Act 1850 (13 & 14 Vict. c. li). The Victoria Dock was built on Plaistow Marshes and opened in 1855.

=== Amalgamation ===
London and Saint Katharine Docks Company Act 1875 (Note: Section 1.)
- Act of Parliament
- Parliament of the United Kingdom
- Long title: An Act for authorising the London and Saint Katharine Docks Company to construct an Eastern Extension of their Victoria Dock upon lands part of the Victoria Dock Estate originally acquired by the Victoria (London) Dock Company for that purpose, with a new entrance from the River Thames at Galleons Reach; and for other purposes.
- Citation: 38 & 39 Vict. c. cliii
- Territorial extent: United Kingdom

Dates
- Royal assent: 19 July 1875
- Commencement: 19 July 1875 (Note: The Acts of Parliament (Commencement) Act 1793.)
- Repealed: 23 December 1920
Other legislation
Amends	Victoria (London) Docks Act 1853
Repealed by	Port of London (Consolidation) Act 1920

Status: Repealed

Text of statute as originally enacted

London and Saint Katharine Docks Act 1878
- Act of Parliament
- Parliament of the United Kingdom
- Long title: An Act to enable the London and Saint Katharine Docks Company to raise further money.
- Citation: 41 & 42 Vict. c. xxii
- Territorial extent: United Kingdom

Dates
- Royal assent: 16 April 1878
- Commencement: 16 April 1878
- Repealed: 23 December 1920
Other legislation
Repealed by	Port of London (Consolidation) Act 1920

Status: Repealed

Text of statute as originally enacted

London and Saint Katharine Docks Act 1882
- Act of Parliament
- Parliament of the United Kingdom
- Long title: An Act to enable the London and Saint Katharine Docks Company to raise further Money and to maintain their Railway from the North Woolwich Branch of the Great Eastern Railway to Galleons Reach and for other purposes.
- Citation: 45 & 46 Vict. c. ii
- Territorial extent: United Kingdom

Dates
- Royal assent: 21 April 1882
- Commencement: 21 April 1882
- Repealed: 23 December 1920
Other legislation
Repealed by	Port of London (Consolidation) Act 1920

Status: Repealed

Text of statute as originally enacted

London and Saint Katharine Docks Company Act 1884
- Act of Parliament
- Parliament of the United Kingdom
- Long title: An Act to enable the London and Saint Katharine Docks Company to make a new entrance to their Royal Albert Dock; and for other purposes.
- Citation: 47 & 48 Vict. c. xv
- Territorial extent: United Kingdom

Dates
- Royal assent: 19 May 1884
- Commencement: 19 May 1884
- Repealed: 23 December 1920
Other legislation
Repealed by	Port of London (Consolidation) Act 1920

Status: Repealed

Text of statute as originally enacted

The London Dock Company and the Saint Katharine Dock Company were merged into a new company, the London and Saint Katharine Docks Company, by the London and Saint Katharine Docks Act 1864 (27 & 28 Vict. c. clxxviii).

The act also merged the Victoria (London) Dock Company into the new company, giving the company a foothold in the area that was to become the Royal Docks. The London and Saint Katharine Docks Company Act 1875 (38 & 39 Vict. c. cliii) authorised construction of the Royal Albert Dock.

=== London and India Docks Company ===
The London and Saint Katharine Docks Company operated in cooperation with the East and West India Dock Company after the London and Saint Katharine and East and West India Docks Act 1888 (51 & 52 Vict. c. cxliii) was passed and the docks passed into the management of the London and India Docks Joint Committee, with representatives of both companies.

The two companies formally merged by the London and India Docks Amalgamation Act 1900 (63 & 64 Vict. c. cxi) as the London and India Docks Company on 1 January 1901.

=== Port of London Authority ===
On 31 March 1909, by the Port of London Act 1908 (8 Edw. 7. c. 68), the London and India Docks Company was taken over by the Port of London Authority.

== See also ==
- East and West India Dock Company
