= List of public art in the London Borough of Tower Hamlets =

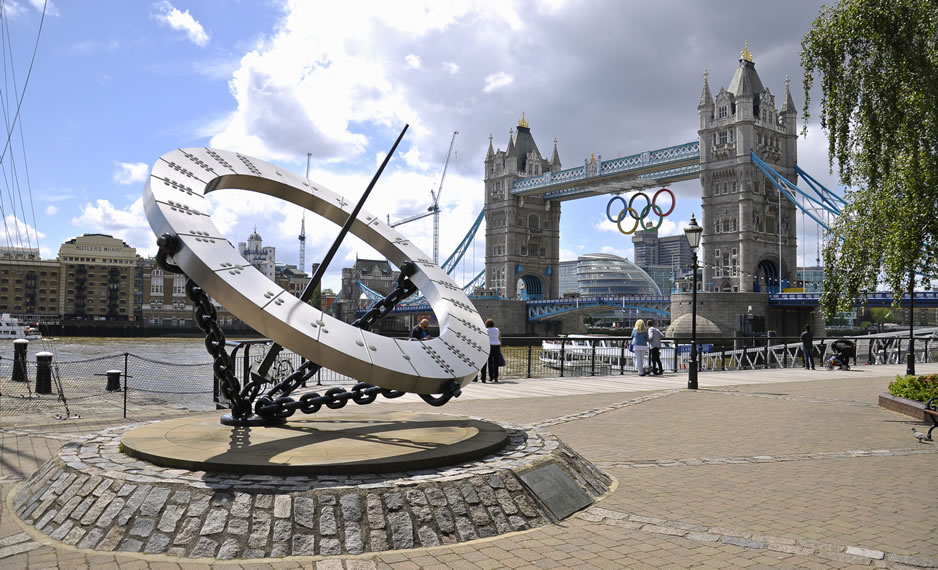
Timepiece (1973) by Wendy Taylor, with Tower Bridge in the background

This is a list of public art in the London Borough of Tower Hamlets.

== Bethnal Green ==
Image	Title / subject	Location and coordinates	Date	Artist / designer	Architect / other	Type	Material	Dimensions	Designation	Notes
	Lesson	Junction of Gosset Street and Turin Street, Avebury Estate 51.5277°N 0.0687°W	1956–1957	Franta Belsky	—N/a	Sculptural group	Bronze		Grade II	Unveiled in July 1959 by Isaac Hayward.
More images	Blind Beggar and his Dog	Cranbrook Estate 51.5298°N 0.0449°W	1958	Elisabeth Frink	—N/a	Sculptural group	Bronze		Grade II*	
More images	Stairway to Heaven Bethnal Green tube station disaster	Bethnal Green tube station 51.5272°N 0.0552°W	2017	—N/a	Harry Paticas	War memorial			—N/a	

== Bromley-by-Bow ==
Image	Title / subject	Location and coordinates	Date	Artist / designer	Architect / other	Type	Designation	Notes
	Bromley-by-Bow (North East Ward) War Memorial	Bromley Recreation Ground, St Leonard's Street 51.5268°N 0.0128°W	1921	—N/a	Harris & Son	Obelisk	—N/a	

== Isle of Dogs ==
Image	Title / subject	Location and coordinates	Date	Artist / designer	Type	Material	Dimensions	Designation	Notes
More images	Isle of Dogs War Memorial	Christ Church, Manchester Road 51.4890°N 0.0067°W	after 1918	?	Crucifix	Portland stone, timber and cast iron		Grade II	
More images	London River Man	Ensign House, Marsh Wall 51.5012°N 0.0213°W	1987	John W. Mills		Bronze	figure 145 cm (57 in) high		
More images	Leap	Blackwall Basin Graving Dock 51.5025°N 0.0089°W	1987–1989	Franta Belsky					
	On Strange and Distant Islands	Westferry Road portal of the Limehouse Link tunnel 51.5077°N 0.0291°W	1992	Michael Kenny	Sculpture	Limestone, marble, stainless steel		—N/a	
	Untitled	Eastern portal of the Limehouse Link tunnel 51.5085°N 0.0225°W	1992	Nigel Hall	Sculpture	Weathering steel	9 m tall	—N/a	
More images	Figurehead for Docklands	Poplar Dock 51.5065°N 0.008°W	1997	Anna Bisset					
More images	Traffic Light Tree	Roundabout on Trafalgar Way, outside Billingsgate Market (since 2013) 51.5068°N 0.0105°W	1998	Pierre Vivant					
More images	Hibbert Gate	Adjacent to North Dock West 51.5068°N 0.0243°W	2000	Leo Stevenson					
	Ecliptical Spheres	Dollar Bay	2019	James Hopkins	Sculptures	Stone and stainless steel		—N/a	

=== Canary Wharf ===
Image	Title / subject	Location and coordinates	Date	Artist / designer	Type	Material	Dimensions	Designation	Notes
More images	London Joint City and Midland Bank War Memorial	8 Canada Square 51.5049°N 0.0188°W	1921	Albert Toft	Tablets in architectural surround with flanking sculptures	Marble and bronze			
More images	Draped Seated Woman 1957–58	Cabot Square	1957–1958	Henry Moore	Sculpture	Bronze			Installed at Cabot Square "for at least five years" from 2017.
More images	Testa Addormentata	Corner of Bank Street and Upper Bank Street 51.50279°N 0.01994°W	1983	Igor Mitoraj					
More images	Centurione I	Columbus Courtyard 51.50628°N 0.02554°W	1987	Igor Mitoraj					
More images	Spirit of Enterprise	South Dock, Canary Wharf 51°30′9.83″N 0°1′29.04″W	1987	Wendy Taylor					
More images	Two Men on a Bench	Cabot Square 51.50545°N 0.02282°W	1990	Giles Penny					
	Cast glass panels	Cabot Square	1992	Jeff Bell	Cast glass panels	Cast lead crystal			Cladding for four ventilation shafts serving an underground car park.
	Gate	Westferry Circus 51.5058°N 0.0272°W	1992	Giuseppe Lund					
	Venus	Jubilee Park 51.5033°N 0.0187°W	1993	Helaine Blumenfeld	Sculpture	Bronze			
More images	Centauro	Upper Bank Street 51.5034°N 0.017°W	1994	Igor Mitoraj					
More images	Man With Arms Open	West India Avenue 51.5055°N 0.0244°W	1995	Giles Penny					
	Minotaur and Hare on Bench	Wood Wharf 51.5018°N 0.0143°W	1995	Sophie Ryder		Bronze			
	Portrait relief of Michael von Clemm	Cabot Square 51.5056°N 0.0233°W	1998	Gerald Laing					
More images	Original Form	25 North Colonnade 51.506°N 0.02°W	1999	Keith Rand					
More images	Six Public Clocks	Reuters Plaza 51.50417°N 0.01971°W	1999	Konstantin Grcic					
More images	Vanishing Point	Westferry Circus 51.5052°N 0.0273°W	1999	Jay Battle					
More images	Columbus Screen	Columbus Courtyard 51.5065°N 0.0254°W	2000	Wendy Ramshaw					
	Kiss	South Colonnade	2000	Nigel Hall	Sculpture	Painted steel			
More images	Returning to Embrace	10 Cabot Square 51.5057°N 0.0224°W	2000	Jon Buck					
	Speaking of the River	Canary Riverside 51°30′22.48″N 0°1′43.72″W	2000	Constance DeJong	audio benches				
	Windwand	Canary Riverside 51°30′20.87″N 0°1′41.43″W	2000	Ron Arad		Carbon fibre	50 m (160 ft) high		
	Unity of Opposites: Vortex	Adams Plaza 51.5055°N 0.0194°W	2001	Michael Lyons	Sculpture	Copper			
	12 Planters	Columbus Courtyard 51.5062°N 0.0251°W	2001–2002	Tatiana Orloff		Bronze			
More images	It Takes Two	Cabot Square 51.5052°N 0.0233°W	2002	Bob Allen	Sculpture	Bronze			
More images	HSBC lions	8 Canada Square 51.5052°N 0.018°W	2002	after W. W. Wagstaff					
	Arbor	Montgomery Square	2003	Nigel Ross					
	Cross Way	Montgomery Square 51.5033°N 0.0171°W	2003	Nigel Ross					
	Sacrificial Anode	Montgomery Square	2007	Eilis O'Connell					
More images	Sasso Cosmico	Westferry Circus 51.50579°N 0.02709°W	2007	Do König Vassilakis					
	Chimney	Westferry Circus 51°30′19.74″N 0°1′34.55″W	2008	Andrew Burton		Recycled fired bricks, steel			
	Avatar	Westferry Circus 51.5058°N 0.0261°W	2009	Robert Worley					
	Helisphere	Heron Quays DLR station	2009	Charles Hadcock	Sculpture	Cast iron			
More images	Torsion II	Bank Street, Jubilee Park exit 51.50295°N 0.01985°W	2009–2011	Charles Hadcock					
More images	Drawing Cube (Blue)	Montgomery Square	2010	Suresh Dutt					
	Turning Point	Wood Wharf 51.5028°N 0.0144°W	2010	Oliver Barratt		Painted bronze			
	Opening Lines	Wood Wharf 51.5028°N 0.0141°W	2010	Oliver Barratt		Painted bronze			
	A Beautiful Sunset Mistaken for a Dawn	Docklands Light Railway bridge over Middle Dock 51.50382°N 0.02124°W	2012	Sinta Tantra	Mural	Paint	30 m (98 ft) long		
	Coquino Coral	Junction of Bank Street and Upper Bank Street	2015	Yvonne Domenge	Sculpture	Polymer with onyx powder; stainless steel base			
	Fortuna	Jubilee Park 51.5035°N 0.0190°W	2016	Helaine Blumenfeld		Bronze			
	The Knot	Wood Wharf 51.5028°N 0.0146°W	2017	Richard Hudson	Sculpture	Mirrored steel			
	Tear	Bank Street 51.5033°N 0.0198°W	2017	Richard Hudson	Sculpture	Mirrored steel			
	Illusion	Cabot Square	2018	Helaine Blumenfeld	Sculpture	Bronze			
	Metamorphosis	Wood Wharf 51.5019°N 0.0147°W	2019	Helaine Blumenfeld	Sculpture	Bronze			
	Skystation	Adams Plaza	2019	Peter Newman	Sculpture				Inspired by the LC4 chaise longue.
	Transitions	Crossrail Place, Everyman lobby 51.5061°N 0.0173°W	2019	Michal Rovner	Video art		16 m (52 ft) long		
More images	Captivated by Colour	Adams Plaza Bridge (interior) 51.50598°N 0.01911°W	2020	Camille Walala	Mural	Vinyl			
More images	The Clew	Cubitt Bridge 51.5045°N 0.0231°W	2020	Ottotto	Sculpture	LED lighting, steel			Originally part of the 2020 Canary Wharf Winter Lights festival, now a permanent installation.
	Scribbleform	Montgomery Square 51.5031°N 0.0163°W	2020	Julian Wild	Sculpture	Painted steel			
	Tandem Lovers	Reuters Plaza 51.5046°N 0.0194°W	2020	Gillie and Marc	Sculpture	Bronze			
	Click Your Heels Together Three Times	Adams Plaza Bridge (underside) 51.50598°N 0.01911°W	2023	Adam Nathaniel Furman	Wrapping				
	Elantica 'The Boulder'	Crossrail Place 51.5059°N 0.0179°W	2023	Tom & Lien Dekyvere	Sculpture	Circuit boards			Originally part of the Canary Wharf Winter Lights festival, now a permanent installation.
More images	Whale on the Wharf (Skyscraper)	Wood Wharf 51.5029°N 0.0138°W	2025	Jason Klimoski and Lesley Chang (StudioKCA)	Sculpture	Plastic waste			Sculpture made from plastic waste collected from oceans.

== Limehouse ==
Image	Title / subject	Location and coordinates	Date	Artist / designer	Type	Designation	Notes
More images	Limehouse (St Anne's) War Memorial	St Anne's churchyard, Commercial Road 51.5121°N 0.0300°W	1921	Arthur George Walker	Statue	Grade II	Unveiled 28 May 1921.
More images	Ratcliff Memorial Cross	St James's Gardens, Butcher Row 51.5110°N 0.0416°W	1923	?	Memorial cross	Grade II	Unveiled 15 April 1923.
	Restless Dream	Western portal of the Limehouse Link tunnel 51.5108°N 0.0403°W	1992	Zadok Ben-David	Sculpture	—N/a	
More images	Herring Gull	Narrow Street 51.5089°N 0.0334°W	1994	Jane Ackroyd	Sculpture	—N/a	
More images	Dragon's Gate	Salter Street, near Westferry DLR station 51.5102°N 0.0267°W	1996	Peter Dunn and Anne Thorne Architects	Sculpture	—N/a	
	Another Time XVI	River Thames off Limehouse 51.5086°N 0.0339°W	2012	Antony Gormley	Sculpture	—N/a	

== Mile End and Bow ==
Image	Title / subject	Location and coordinates	Date	Artist / designer	Type	Designation	Notes
More images	Statue of William Ewart Gladstone	In front of Bow Church, Bow Road 51.5284°N 0.0179°W	1882	Albert Bruce-Joy	Statue	Grade II	
	Bust of Edward VII	39 Mile End Road 51.5205°N 0.0538°W	1911	?	Bust	Grade II	Unveiled 12 October 1911.
	Memorial to George Lansbury	Bow Road 51.5268°N 0.0274°W	1955		Memorial	—N/a	
	Bryant & May War Memorial	Grove Hall Park 51.5295°N 0.0178°W	1958	?	Memorial cross	Grade II	
	Statue of Clement Attlee	Queen Mary University of London Mile End campus 51.5239°N 0.0396°W	1988	Frank Forster	Statue	—N/a	Unveiled 30 November 1988 in its original location, outside Limehouse Library, by Harold Wilson, the last living member of Attlee's cabinet. The figure holds a copy of the National Assistance Act 1948. In 2005 the work was badly vandalised and was boxed up to prevent further damage; it was removed to its current location in 2010. Peter Mandelson gave the statue its second unveiling on 4 April 2011.
	Knowledge	Library Square, Queen Mary University of London Mile End campus 51.5243°N 0.0403°W	2003	Wendy Taylor	Sculpture	—N/a	An abstract representation of knowledge in stainless steel. The sphere with its smooth surface stands for the world and the ease with which knowledge can spread and be shared. The arms attached to the globe represent the giving and acceptance of knowledge.
	Sculptural seating	Mile End Park 51.5267°N 0.0390°W	2006	Leona Matuszczak	Sculptural benches	—N/a	Group of four sculptural benches made from concrete.
More images	Sustrans Portrait Bench	Mile End Park 51.5281°N 0.0400°W	2011	?	Sculpture	—N/a	Unveiled 15 August 2011. Depicts Sylvia Pankhurst, Ledley King, and a towpath horse (not pictured).
	Elephant in the Room	Library Square, Queen Mary University of London Mile End campus 51.5243°N 0.0402°W	2017	Hannah Stewart and Chierol Lai	Sculpture	—N/a	A sculpture in bronze resin of a sleeping baby elephant, intended to raise awareness of mental health issues and commissioned following a competition run by Queen Mary Students' Union.

== Poplar and Blackwall ==
Image	Title / subject	Location and coordinates	Date	Artist / designer	Type	Designation	Notes
More images	The White Horse	Corner of Poplar High Street and Saltwell Street 51.5094°N 0.0212°W	18th century	?	Wooden sculpture	Grade II	Sign for a pub demolished in 2003.
	Female figure (formerly holding a cornucopia)	Lansbury Lawrence School, Poplar	Mid-19th century	?	Architectural sculpture	Grade II	From the Horn of Plenty pub, which stood on or near this site; mounted on the wall of the newly built school in 1951.
More images	Statue of Richard Green	East India Dock Road 51.511°N 0.0141°W	1865/1866	Edward William Wyon	Statue	Grade II	
	Blackwall tunnel plaque	Blackwall Tunnel northern approach, south of East India Dock Road 51.5113°N 0.0073°W	1897	Alfred Drury	Commemorative plaque	—N/a	Originally located on the original entrance gateway, demolished in 1959.
More images	Children's Memorial	Poplar Recreation Ground 51.5106°N 0.0167°W	1919	A. R. Adams		Grade II	Unveiled 23 June 1919. Commemorates the 18 children who were killed in a bombing raid (the first daylight raid of World War I) on Upper North Street School on 13 June 1917.
More images	Poplar (St Michael and All Angels) War Memorial	St Leonard's Road 51.5159°N 0.0114°W	1920	A. R. Adams	Sculptural group	Grade II	Unveiled 4 December 1920 by the Duke of York (the future George V).
	Poplar Rates Rebellion Mural Poplar Rates Rebellion	Hale Street 51.5096°N 0.0176°W	1990	Mark Francis	Mural	—N/a	
	Meridian Metaphor	Near the junction of Clove Crescent and Saffron Avenue	1991	David Jacobson	Sculpture		Removed in 2018
	Shadow Play	In front of Compass House, Mulberry Place 51.5103°N 0.0059°W	1992	Dave King			
More images	Domino Players	Clove Crescent 51.5096°N 0.0054°W	1992	Kim Bennet			
	Aerobic	Leamouth Roundabout 51.51085°N 0.00104°E	1993	Allen Jones			
More images	Mariner's Astrolabe, Virginia Quay Settlers Monument	Jamestown Way 51.5079°N 0.0003°E	1999	Wendy Taylor		Grade II	
	Acorn Wall Relief	Brunswick Wharf 51.5101°N 0.0004°E	2003	Wendy Taylor			
	Statue of Teddy Baldock	Langdon Park 51.5155°N 0.0137°W	2014	Carl Payne	Statue	—N/a	Unveiled 15 May 2014. Known as the "Pride of Poplar", the boxer grew up nearby on Byron Street. The statue was stolen on 1 February 2026.
	Blackwall Line	Station Square, Blackwall Reach	2020	Jo Chapman	Sculpture		Based on a Blackwall hitch, referencing the former Hercules Rope Works in Blackwall.
More images	Renaissance	Nutmeg Lane, East India Docks		Maurice Blik			

== St Katharine Docks ==
Image	Title / subject	Location and coordinates	Date	Artist / designer	Type	Designation	Notes
	Cannon	Entrance to St Katharine Docks 51.5061°N 0.0725°W	18th century				
	Anchor of Amsterdam	St Katharine Docks, at entrance to East Dock 51.5069°N 0.0708°W	1748 (placed here 1980s)				
More images	Girl with a Dolphin	Beside River Thames between Tower Bridge and entrance to docks 51.5062°N 0.0737°W	1973	David Wynne			
More images	Timepiece	Entrance to St Katharine Docks 51.5061°N 0.0726°W	1973	Wendy Taylor		Grade II	
	Elephants	Entrance to Ivory House, on gateposts 51.5082°N 0.071°W	1973	Peter Drew			
	Silver Jubilee Crystal Crown	Tower Hotel 51.507°N 0.0727°W	1977	Arthur Fleischmann	Relief		
	Geese	Thomas More Street	1990	David Norris			
	To Meet Again	Thomas More Street 51.5071°N 0.0676°W	1990	Michael Beck			
	Angelic Musician	Thomas More Street	1991	Carl Milles			
	Exotic Birds and other sculptures	Various locations around St Katharine Docks	1995–1997	Paula Haughney			

== Shadwell ==
Image	Title / subject	Location and coordinates	Date	Artist / designer	Type	Designation	Notes
	Memorial to Edward VII	King Edward Memorial Park 51.5096°N 0.0485°W	1922	Bertram Mackennal	Drinking fountain (formerly)		The bronze portrait medallion of Edward VII was stolen in 2007.
	Navigators' Memorial	King Edward Memorial Park 51.5086°N 0.0484°W	1922	?	Commemorative stone		
	Decorative enamel panels	Shadwell railway station 51.5113°N 0.0568°W	1995	Sarah McMenemy	Murals	—N/a	
	Cargoes	King Edward Memorial Park	2025	Hew Locke	Sculptures	—N/a	Commissioned as part of the Tideway scheme. A series of cast bronze boats, including a tug, a Chinese junk, a flat barge, a carrack, a Thames sailing barge and a Bangladesh river boat.

== Spitalfields ==
Image	Title / subject	Location and coordinates	Date	Artist / designer	Type	Designation	Notes
More images	Spitalfields roundels	Various locations around Spitalfields	1995	Keith Bowler	Bronze roundels in pavement	—N/a	Originally 25 roundels of different designs, around half of them remain
	The Whitechapel Threads	Bethnal Green Road, between Sclater Street and Braithwaite Street 51.5236°N 0.0747°W	1996	Tim Coppard and Hattie Coppard	Bronze sculpture	—N/a	The plaque reads “The threads are a reminder of the importance of the garment and textile industries in this part of London and of the many communities who have lived and worked in the area.”
	Brick Lane Arch / Banglatown Arch	Brick Lane 51.5177°N 0.0709°W	1997	Mina Thakur	Decorative arch	—N/a	Using the colours red and green of the flag of Bangladesh, marks the entrance to "Banglatown" on Brick Lane. Renovated in 2022.
	Vortex	Lamb Street 51.5203°N 0.0753°W	1999	Barbara Sandler	Sculpture	—N/a	
More images	I Goat	Brushfield Street 51.5191°N 0.0779°W	2011	Kenny Hunter	Sculpture	—N/a	
	Wooden Boat with Seven People	Brushfield Street 51.5191°N 0.0769°W	2011	Kalliopi Lemos	Sculpture	—N/a	
	Rabbitwoman and Dogman Drinking Coffee	Bishops Square 51.5195°N 0.0776°W	2017	Gillie and Marc	Sculpture	—N/a	
	Together Forever on Wheels	Bishops Square 51.5193°N 0.0771°W	2021	Gillie and Marc	Sculpture	—N/a	
	The Land is Calling	Brick Lane 51.5178°N 0.0708°W	2022	Mohammed Ali	Mural	—N/a	Commissioned for the 50th anniversary of Bangladesh's independence.
	Monkeys	Brick Lane 51.5231°N 0.0715°W	2024	Banksy	Graffiti	—N/a	Appeared on 7 August 2024. This was the third work by Banksy on an animal theme to appear in London in three consecutive days; six more were to follow.

== Tower Hill ==
Image	Title / subject	Location and coordinates	Date	Artist / designer	Architect / other	Type	Designation	Notes
More images	Merchant Navy First World War Memorial	Trinity Square Gardens 51.5096°N 0.0777°W	1928	William Reid Dick	Edwin Lutyens	War memorial	Grade I	
	Memorial to Charles Wakefield, 1st Viscount Wakefield	41 Trinity Square 51.5104°N 0.0768°W	1937	Cecil Thomas	—N/a	Portrait plaque	Grade II	
More images	Merchant Navy Second World War Memorial	Trinity Square Gardens 51.5097°N 0.0780°W	1952	Charles Wheeler	Edward Maufe	War memorial	Grade II*	
More images	City of London dragon boundary mark	Byward Street 51.5094°N 0.0786°W	Late 1960s	Birmingham Guild Limited	—N/a	Boundary post with sculpture	—N/a	Half-size replica of the original 19th-century sculptures from the Coal Exchange, now at the Victoria Embankment.
More images	Statue of Trajan	Trinity Place 51.5099°N 0.0762°W	20th century, after an original of the 2nd century	?	—N/a	Statue	—N/a	
	The Sea	Tower Hill Terrace 51.5093°N 0.0788°W	1965–1966	Cecil Thomas		Sculptural groups on gateposts	—N/a	
More images	Sundial	Wakefield Gardens, outside Tower Hill tube station 51.5098°N 0.0765°W	1992	Edwin Russell	John Chitty and Mike Duffie (landscape architects)	Sundial	—N/a	
More images	Merchant Navy Falklands War Memorial	Trinity Square Gardens 51.5097°N 0.0771°W	2005	Gordon Newton	—N/a	War memorial	—N/a	
More images	The Building Worker	Tower Hill 51.5094°N 0.0756°W	2006	Alan Wilson	—N/a	Statue	—N/a	

== Victoria Park and Hackney Wick ==
Image	Title / subject	Location and coordinates	Date	Artist / designer	Architect / other	Type	Designation	Notes
More images	Baroness Burdett Coutts Drinking Fountain Angela Burdett-Coutts, 1st Baroness Burdett-Coutts	Victoria Park 51.5371°N 0.0397°W	1862	—N/a	Henry Astley Darbishire	Drinking fountain	Grade II*	
	Hackney Wick War Memorial	Eastern side of Victoria Park, near Cadogan Terrace 51.5427°N 0.0303°W	1921	?	?	Obelisk	Grade II	Unveiled 12 March 1921.

== Wapping ==
Image	Title / subject	Location and coordinates	Date	Artist / designer	Type	Designation	Notes
	Bluecoat Boy	Raine's House 51.5067°N 0.0579°W		?	Statue in niche		
	Bluecoat Girl	Raine's House 51.5067°N 0.058°W		?	Statue in niche		
	Bust of John Rennie the Elder	Spirit Quay 51.5058°N 0.0624°W	1992	John Ravera	Bust	—N/a	
More images	Rope Circle	Hermitage Basin 51.5057°N 0.0668°W	1997	Wendy Taylor			
	Voyager	Cinnabar Wharf East	2001	Wendy Taylor	Sculpture		
More images	Memorial to the Civilians of East London, 2nd World War 1939–1945	Hermitage Riverside Memorial Garden	2008	Wendy Taylor	Sculpture	—N/a	Unveiled in July 2008 by Hazel Blears, then the Secretary of State for Communities and Local Government, and Alf Roffey, a survivor of the Blitz. On the site of Hermitage Wharf, which was destroyed in a bombing raid on 29 December 1940.

== Whitechapel and Stepney ==
Image	Title / subject	Location and coordinates	Date	Artist / designer	Type	Designation	Notes
More images	Drinking fountain	White Church Lane 51.5161°N 0.0692°W	1860	?	Drinking fountain	Grade II	Relocated from the Whitechapel Road. Inscribed "from one unknown yet well known", perhaps referring to William Weldon Champneys.
	Shepherd Boy Fountain	Albert Gardens, Stepney 51.5131°N 0.0472°W	1903	?	Drinking fountain with statue	Grade II	The figure is holding a sickle and leaning against a sheaf of corn, so is actually a harvester rather than a shepherd. Made in Paris by the Fonderies d'art du Val D'Orne.
	Statue of Alexandra of Denmark	Royal London Hospital, Stepney Way 51.5175°N 0.0592°W	1908	George Edward Wade	Statue	Grade II	
More images	King Edward VII Jewish Memorial Drinking Fountain	Whitechapel Road 51.5191°N 0.0603°W	1911	William Silver Frith	Drinking fountain with sculpture	Grade II	
More images	Stepney War Memorial	St Dunstan's churchyard 51.5168°N 0.0423°W	after 1918	?	Celtic cross	Grade II	
More images	St George in the East War Memorial	St George's Gardens (former churchyard of St George in the East) 51.5103°N 0.0595°W	1924	Joseph Clayton	Obelisk	Grade II	Unveiled 15 November 1924.
	Bust of William Booth	Mile End Road 51.5200°N 0.0559°W	1927	George Edward Wade	Bust		
	Cable Street Mural Battle of Cable Street	St George's Town Hall 51.5110°N 0.0586°W	1976–1983	Desmond Rochfort, Dave Binnington, Paul Butler and Ray Walker	Mural		
More images	Statue of William Booth	Mile End Road 51.5204°N 0.0542°W	1979 (casting)	George Edward Wade	Statue		
	Les Naï[a]des	45 Whitechapel Road	1985	Ivor Abrahams	Sculpture	—N/a	
	Gateway arch Altab Ali	Entrance to Altab Ali Park 51.5161°N 0.0693°W	1989	David Petersen			
More images	Spitalfields Column	Middlesex Street 51.5151°N 0.0747°W	1995	Richard Perry	Sculpture	—N/a	
	Ram and Magpie	Allen Gardens Playground, Buxton Street 51.5219°N 0.0677°W	1996	Paula Haughney	Sculpture	—N/a	
	Platform artworks	Whitechapel station	1997	Doug Patterson	Murals	—N/a	
More images	Shaheed Minar (Martyrs' Monument)	Altab Ali Park, on the corner of Whitechapel Road and White Church Lane 51.5159°N 0.0687°W	1999	After Hamidur Rahman	Sculpture	—N/a	Unveiled 17 February 1999 by Humayun Rashid Choudhury. A smaller replica of the Shaheed Minar in Dhaka, Bangladesh.
	Erasmus Weathervane	Whitechapel Gallery 51.5161°N 0.0701°W	2007	Rodney Graham	Weathervane		
	The Lady	Whitechurch Passage 51.5159°N 0.0693°W	2012	"Chinagirl Tile"	Ceramic relief	—N/a	
More images	Statue of Catherine Booth	Mile End Road 51.5204°N 0.0545°W	2015	After George Edward Wade	Statue	—N/a	Unveiled 2 July 2015.
More images	The Goodman's Fields Horses	Goodman's Fields Piazza 51.5136°N 0.0693°W	2015	Hamish Mackie	Sculptures, some set in a fountain	—N/a	Winner of the PMSA's Marsh Award for Excellence in Public Fountains.
	Bust of Sheikh Mujibur Rahman	Sidney Street 51.5189°N 0.0555°W	2016	?	Bust	—N/a	
	A Sunday Afternoon in Whitechapel	Whitechapel station	2018	Chantal Joffe	Aluminium panels	—N/a	A series of 2m-tall panels in laser-cut aluminium depicting members of the local community, enlarged from paper collages. A homage to Seurat's Sunday Afternoon on La Grande Jatte (1884).

== See also ==
- List of public art formerly in London for the statue of Robert Milligan (by Richard Westmacott), Faun with Goose (George Ehrlich) and Woman with Fish (Frank Dobson)
- The Wake (sculpture), a forthcoming memorial to victims of the Atlantic slave trade by the sculptor Khaleb Brooks, due to be installed at West India Quay in 2027

== Bibliography ==
- Matthews, Peter (2018). London's Statues and Monuments. Oxford: Shire Publications.
- Ward-Jackson, Philip (2003). Public Sculpture of the City of London. Public Sculpture of Britain. Liverpool: Liverpool University Press.
