= King Edward Park =

King Edward Park may refer to:

== Places ==
=== Australia ===
- King Edward Park, Brisbane, Queensland
- King Edward Park, East Maitland, New South Wales
- King Edward Park, Glen Innes, New South Wales
- King Edward Park, Newcastle, New South Wales

=== Canada ===
- King Edward Park, Edmonton in Edmonton, Alberta

=== United Kingdom ===
==== England ====
- King Edward Memorial Park in Shadwell, London, England
