= Traffic light (disambiguation) =

A traffic light is a traffic control device.

Traffic light or traffic lights may also refer to:

- Ramzor (Traffic Light), a 2008 Israeli television series
- Traffic Light (TV series), a 2011 American television series
- Traffic light coalition, a type of political coalition
- Traffic Light Protocol, a system for classifying sensitive information
- Traffic light rating system. a system for indicating the status of a variable using the red, amber, or green of traffic lights
- Traffic light system, the colloquial name for the COVID-19 Protection Framework used by the New Zealand Government
- "Traffic Light" (song), a 2021 song by Lee Mu-jin
- "Traffic Lights" (Lena Meyer Landrut song), a song by Lena Meyer-Landrut's 2015 album Crystal Sky
- "Traffic Light", a song on the Ting Tings' 2008 album We Started Nothing
- "Traffic Lights", a song on Monty Python's 1980 album Monty Python's Contractual Obligation Album
- Blue bottle experiment, also known as the Traffic Light reaction

== See also ==
- Traffic Light Tree, a piece of art
- Traffic-light auction, a type of auction
