= The Last Three =

The Last Three may refer to:

- That Nazty Nuisance, a 1943 American film, also known as The Last Three
- The Last Three (sculpture), a bronze sculpture by Gillie and Marc
- The Last Three of Venus, fictional Venusian scientists and adversaries of Dan Dare
