= Samuel Goldman (civil servant) =

Sir Samuel Goldman KCB (10 March 1912 – 28 July 2007) was Second Permanent Secretary at Her Majesty's Treasury and later an international banker.

He was the youngest son of Jewish immigrants. He was educated at the Davenant Foundation School and Raine's School. His father and brothers worked in the clothing business but at the age of 17 he gained a scholarship to the London School of Economics (LSE). His BSc in 1932 was the top first in Economics; he won the Gladstone Memorial Prize. In 1934 he gained an MSc for a thesis titled "English Theory of Capital from a Hayekian Viewpoint." Hayek himself approved the thesis.

He worked for Moody's Economist Services, 1934–38, Joseph Sebag & Co., 1938–39 and the Bank of England, 1940–47. He joined the Civil Service in 1947, first in the Central Statistical Office then transferred to the Treasury in September 1947. The leading priority then in the Treasury was post-war recovery. He spent his career in the finance group until 1968, becoming Chief Statistician, 1948; Assistant Secretary, 1952; Under-Secretary, 1960 and Third Secretary, 1962. In 1968, he was appointed Second Permanent Secretary in charge of public spending, serving under both the Labour government of Harold Wilson and the Conservative one of Edward Heath. He was made CB in 1963 and KCB in 1969.

Retiring in 1972, he became chairman of Henry Ansbacher Holdings and managing director of Orion Bank. He was Chairman of the Covent Garden Market Authority, 1976-81. He was among the first people to be made an honorary fellow of LSE.
