= Raine's Foundation School =

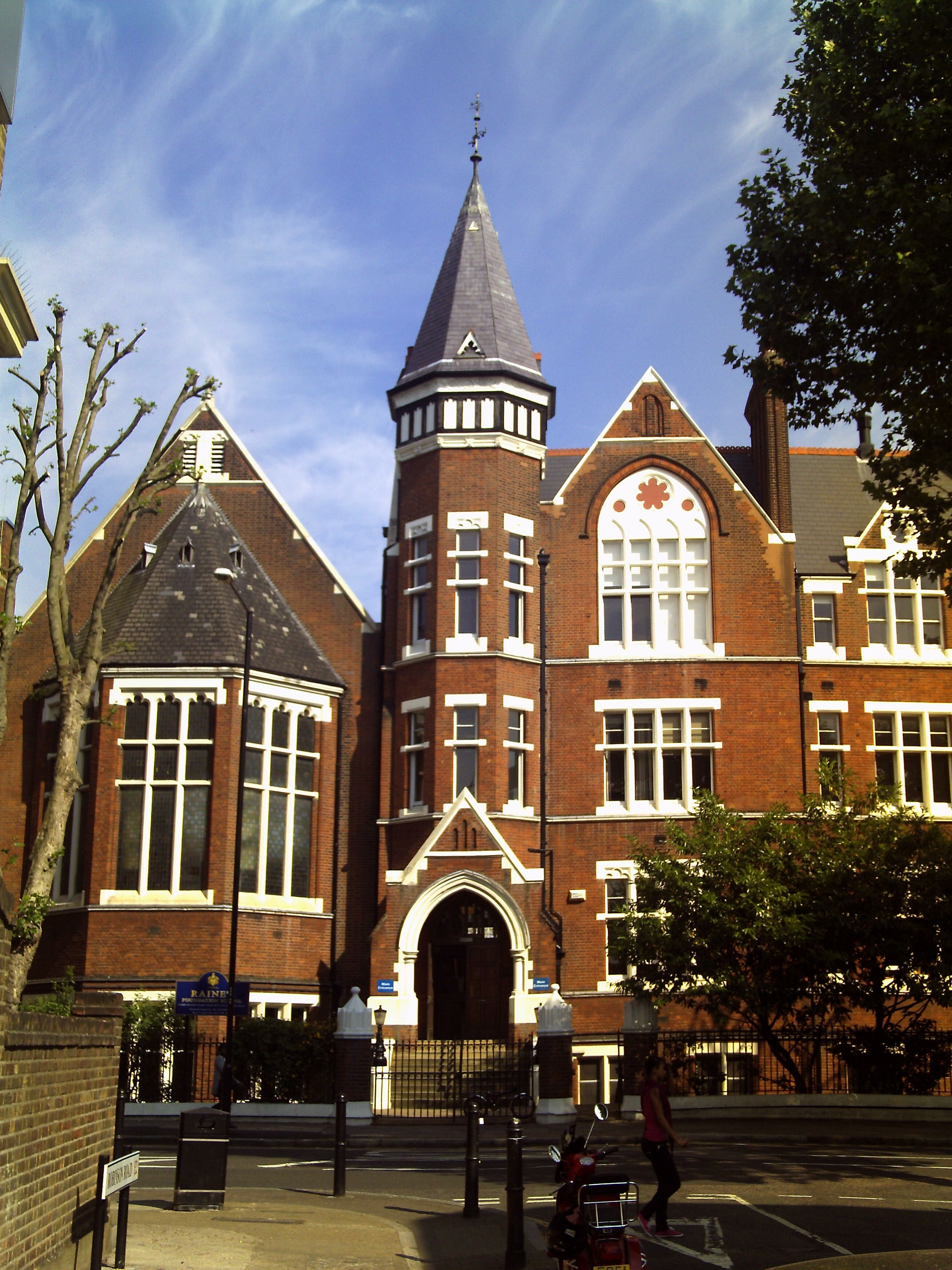

Location
- Approach Road; Bethnal Green, London, E2 9LY; England
- Coordinates: 51.5312°N 0.0511°W

Information
- Type: Voluntary aided school
- Motto: Come in and learn your duty to God and man
- Religious affiliation: Church of England
- Established: 1719; 307 years ago
- Founder: Henry Raine
- Closed: 2020
- Local authority: Tower Hamlets
- Department for Education URN: 100979 Tables
- Ofsted: Reports
- Gender: Mixed
- Age: 11 to 18
- Enrolment: 815
- Colours: Black, blue
- Former name: Raine's Foundation Grammar School

Raine's Foundation School was a Church of England voluntary aided school based on two sites in Bethnal Green in the London Borough of Tower Hamlets, England.

It was situated in the north of Bethnal Green, just to the east of Cambridge Heath Road (A107) and half a mile south of the Regent's Canal and not far from the Cambridge Heath railway station. It was opposite the London Chest Hospital, just off the Old Ford Road and in the parish of St James-the-Less, Bethnal Green.

Henry Raine, a very rich man who lived in Wapping, decided to create a school where poor children could get an education for free, so that they could go into skilled labour when they left. In 1719, the Lower School opened. It has moved many times and before closure the school had two separate buildings, one for Years 7 and 8, and one for Year 9 and above. From September 2010, due to works associated with the Building Schools for the Future (BSF) scheme, the Lower School site accommodated Years 7 to 8, with Years 9 to 13 remaining at the Upper School. The school closed in 2020 due to low pupil numbers.

== History ==
Henry Raine had made a good sum of money from selling alcohol. However he was a devout Christian, and he knew that he should use his wealth for good. He decided to found a school where poor children could get a free education. He built it in Wapping, where he lived and named it "the Lower School". The site still exists and is called Raine's House It opened in 1719.

"The Lower School", was designed to provide an education for fifty boys and fifty girls between the ages of 8 and 18 years. They would learn "the three Rs", which were reading, writing and arithmetic. Girls however were also taught to sew and to cook, and boys were also made to shovel coal underground for the school's heating, and to scrub the floors. This was done in between periods.

=== Boarding school ===
In 1736 Henry built and set aside money for a boarding school which would take on forty girls from the Lower School. It was known as "Raine's Hospital" and later "Asylum"(this did not have the connotations it has today). It would have been quite pleasant, with clothes being provided along with frequent meals.

The boys and the girls were separated at first and the boys would be beaten if caught talking to a girl. Because of this a fence was put up between the boarding and lower school.

In 1820, a new boys' school was opened as there was a large increase in boys at the lower school which was only a boys' school, the girls had the boarding school but were soon to move to the Lower School. It was opened in Silver Street by the Duke of Clarence who was later King William IV.

In 1883, the boarding school closed and a new boys' and girls' school opened in Cannon Street Road. Not all places were free anymore, it was 3d a week for the preparatory school and 6d for the senior school.

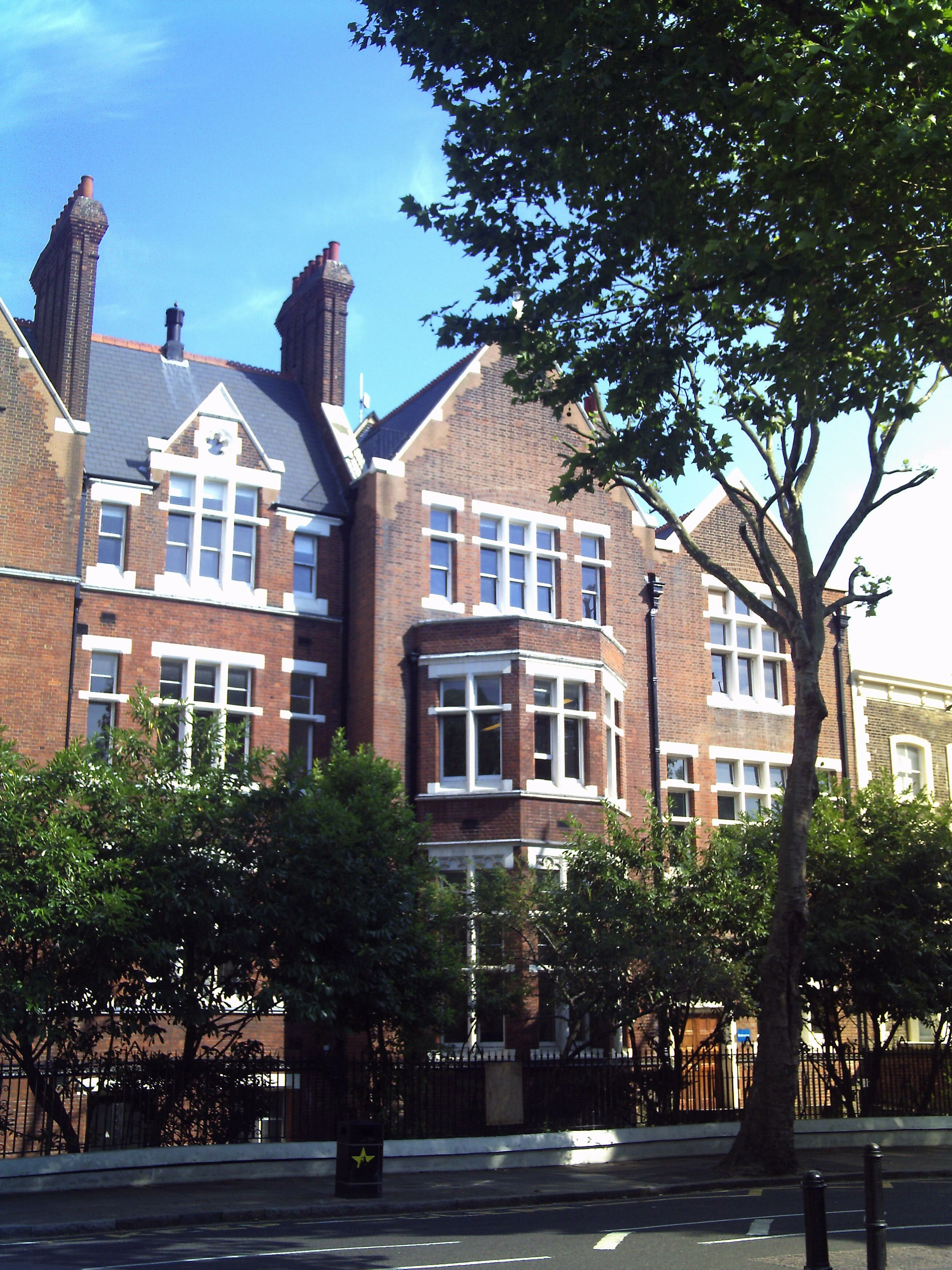
Raine's Foundation School-Approach Road site-part to south.

=== Former site ===
In 1913, the school moved to Arbour Square in Stepney; the building still stands today and is part of Tower Hamlets College. It was state of the art with its gymnasium, science laboratories, a girls' cookery room and in World War I a rifle range was built on the open rooftop for boys to prepare for army service in the war. The separation for boys and girls continued until 1964; even the hall was separated by a hinged folding wooden dividing wall.

=== Comprehensive ===
In 1977, Raine's merged with St Jude's Secondary School and became a comprehensive school.

In 1985, the school moved to Old Bethnal Green Road (the lower school for years 7 and 8), and the old Parmiter's building in Approach Road. Both are in Bethnal Green and remain there until closure. The Upper School site is being redeveloped from Summer 2010 as part of the Building Schools for the Future project. This resulted in Year 9 being based in the Lower School building.

In January 2020 Tower Hamlets London Borough Council made the decision to close the school due to low pupil numbers. The school formally closed in August 2020.

== Notable former pupils ==
Notable past pupils include:

- Eddie Marsan (born 1968), actor
- Simone Callender (born 1978), judoka
- Franz Drameh, actor
- Jocelyn Jee Esien, comedian
- Phillips Idowu (born 1978), world champion triple jumper, 2006 Commonwealth Games gold and 2008 Olympics silver
- Leon Knight (born 1982), professional footballer
- Anwar Uddin, footballer
- Terry Skiverton footballer

=== Raine's Foundation Grammar School ===
- Steven Berkoff (born 1937), actor, writer and director
- Georgia Brown, actor and singer
- Sidney Bloom, restaurant proprietor, founder of Bloom's restaurant
- Prof Gerald Dworkin, Herbert Smith Professor of European Law from 1993–7 at King's College London
- Leonard Fenton, actor
- Norman Giller (born 1940), sports historian and television scriptwriter
- Prof David Glass, Professor of Sociology at the LSE from 1948–78, and former President of the British Society for Population Studies
- Sir Samuel Goldman CB
- Mildred Gordon, Labour MP from 1987–97 for Bow and Poplar
- Prof Cyril Hilsum CBE (born 1925), physicist and academic, President from 1988–90 of the Institute of Physics who developed the semiconductor laser
- Rt Rev Alfred Charles Holland, Bishop of Newcastle, Australia from 1978–92
- Ralph Leigh, Rousseau scholar, Professor of French at the University of Cambridge from 1973–82
- Prof Nathaniel Lichfield, town planner notably involved with Milton Keynes and Peterborough, and Professor of Environmental Planning from 1966–79 at UCL
- Ivor Mairants (1908–1998), jazz and classical guitarist, teacher and composer
- Ann Mitchell (born 1939), actress
- Prof Sidney Michaelson (1925-1991) Scotland's first professor of Computer Science.
- Prof Walter Thomas James Morgan CBE (1900–2003), pioneer of immunochemistry, Professor of Biochemistry from 1951–69 at the University of London and Director from 1972–5 of The Lister Institute of Preventive Medicine
- Tony Rivers (born 1940), singer
- Dr Arthur Seldon CBE, economist
- Michael Varah (1944–2007), 800m runner, son of Chad Varah, who competed in the 1966 British Empire and Commonwealth Games
