= Gillie and Marc =

Artist team

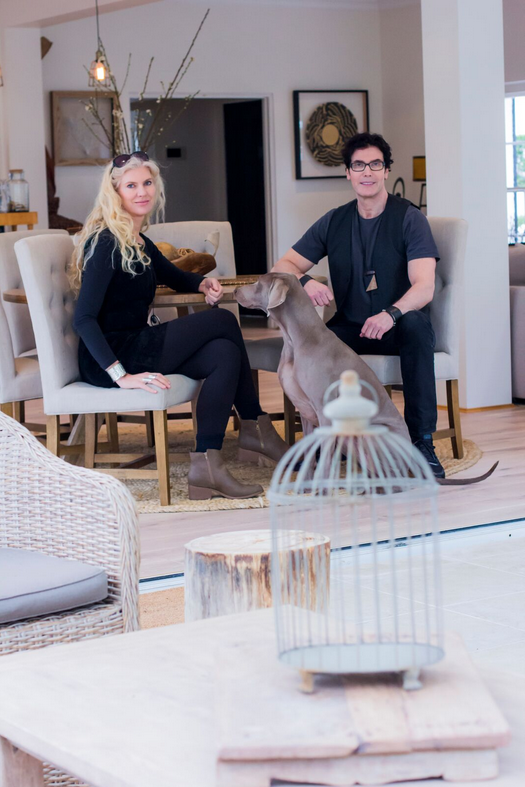
- Gillie and Marc Schattner in 2017
- Website: gillieandmarc.com

Gillie and Marc Schattner are a British and Australian collaborative artist couple. Gillie and Marc are known for their animal, human-animal hybrid and abstract sculptures, which have been exhibited as public works of art around the world. They also create paintings, street art and statues of people.

== Career ==
Gillie and Marc created and placed a big sculpture of The Last Three Northern white rhinoceros, in Astor Place. Art critic Jerry Saltz called their work "a kitschy monstrosity," and said that it "proves my adage that 95 percent of all public sculpture is crap."

Marc studied graphic design at Swinburne, Melbourne, while Gillie received no formal art training. Prior to collaborating, Gillie worked as a model, and Marc was an artist from Melbourne working in an advertising agency. The Schattners first exhibited as a pair in Singapore in 1990. Upon returning to Australia in 1999, they had a joint exhibition called Life Can’t Wait, painting portraits of twenty Australians who face death and were on the organ waiting list. The project was sponsored by the Australian Red Cross Blood Service and was used to create awareness and encourage the public to sign up to be organ donors. In 2006 they were Archibald Prize finalists for a portrait of former Olympic swimmer John Konrads representing his battle with bi-polar disorder. They made their first hybrid human-animal heads in 2005; they created the characters Dogman and Rabbitgirl, (who later became Rabbitwoman) in 2011. Their work has been stolen, and the nude figures have generated controversy.

== Public sculptures ==
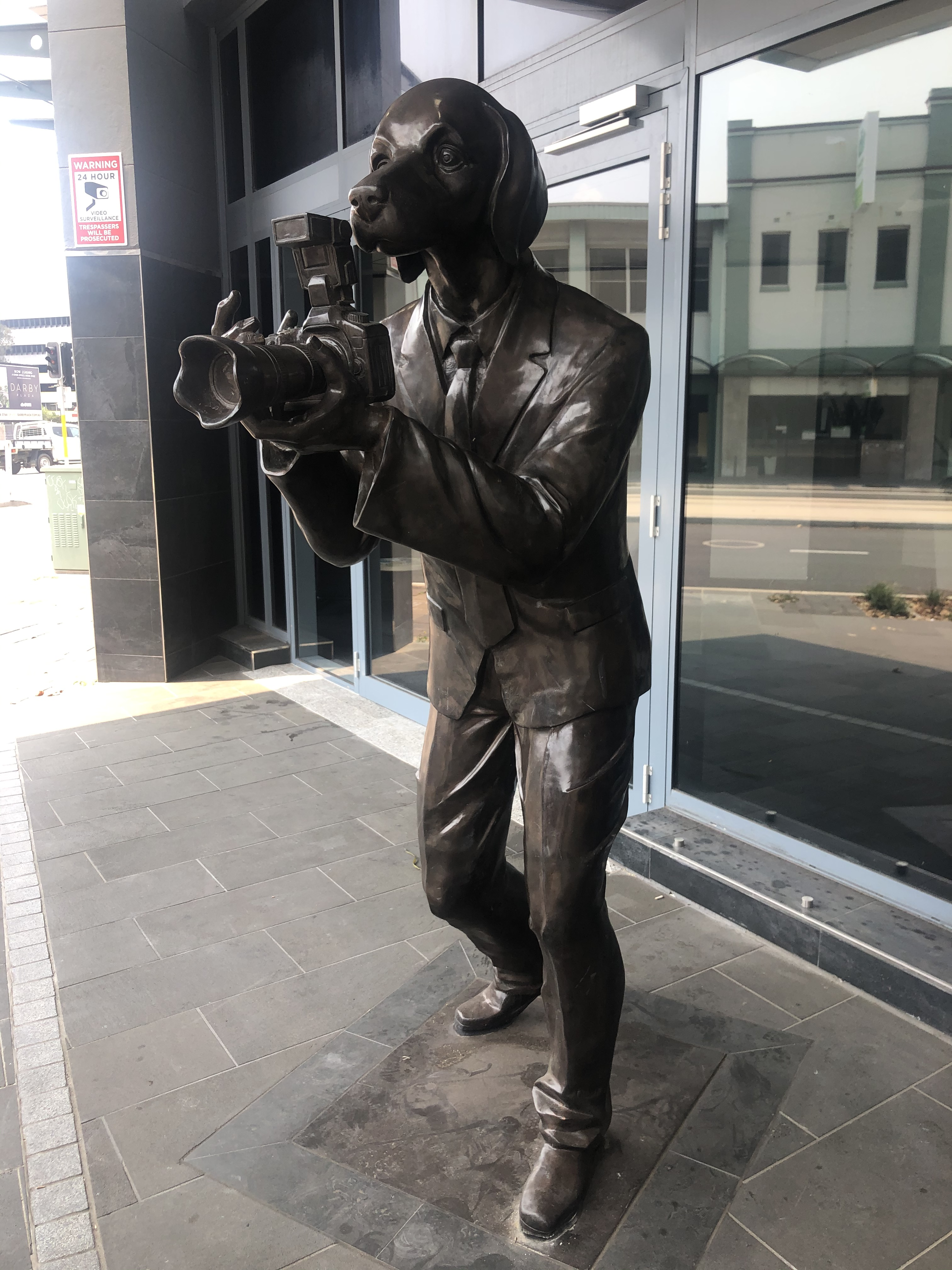
A Paparazzi Dog, on permanent display in Hunter Street, Newcastle, Australia

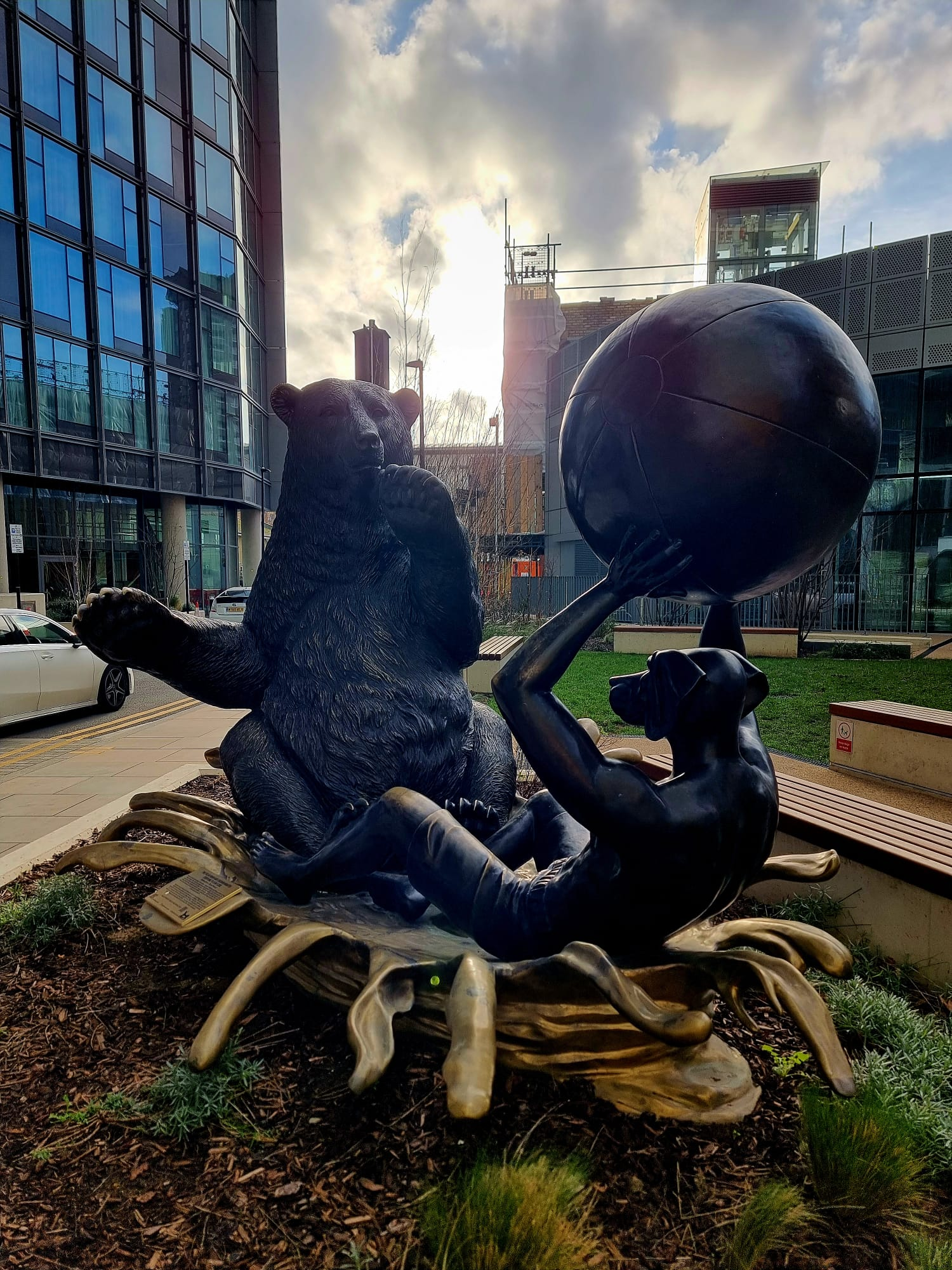
The Polar Bear and Dogman Wanted Everyone to Stay Cool, on permanent display on the Isle of Dogs, London, UK

In 2013, Gillie and Marc created a series of sculptures depicting a dog holding a camera, which were exhibited in Melbourne, Sydney, Singapore, Beijing, Shanghai and New York City.

In March 2017, Gillie and Marc announced plans to build what they claimed would be the "world's largest rhino sculpture" in Astor Place New York's East Village to raise awareness for rhino conservation. On March 14, 2018, the 17-feet tall sculpture was unveiled representing Sudan, Najin and Fatu - the last three Northern White Rhinos. Coincidentally, three days after the installation of The Last Three, Sudan, the last male Northern White Rhino died. Flowers were brought to the sculpture's base.

On Women's Equality Day (August 26) 2019 a group of 10 commissioned bronze sculptures were unveiled at 1285 Avenue of the Americas in New York City. All the pieces were created by Gillie and Marc. The 10 sculptures depict Oprah Winfrey, P!nk, Nicole Kidman, Jane Goodall, Cate Blanchett, Tererai Trent, Janet Mock, Tracy Dyson, Cheryl Strayed and Gabby Douglas.

Gillie and Marc created the Statue of Ruth Bader Ginsburg—a bronze sculpture of Associate Justice of the Supreme Court of the United States Ruth Bader Ginsburg. The statue was created in 2019, with Ginsburg's cooperation, as part of their installation "Statues for Equality." The statue was unveiled again and installed permanently on March 12, 2021, at City Point in Downtown Brooklyn, New York City. The 2,298 kg bronze sculpture entitled ‘rise up rhino’ was installed at Westfield London on Earth Day 2022. Other Rhino sculptures have been installed in Dubbo, La Trobe University, and Tamarama Beach where the sculpture won the Allen's People's Choice Award and Kids' Choice Award after it survived a king tide. They have also made sculptures of lions, tigers, and other animals.

In 2020, 21 bronze elephants were installed at Marble Arch in London which were created by Gillie and Marc after studying a mother and 20 orphans at the Sheldrick Wildlife Trust in Kenya. Also in 2020, the world's largest sculpture of Gorilla titled King Nyani was displayed in New York to raise awareness and funds for the critically endangered gorilla species. In 2022 Gillie and Marc installed nine, six-foot-tall sculptures of Critically Endangered animals called "Faces of the Wild" in Greenwich Village's Ruth Wittenberg Triangle to raise awareness about animals that are at risk of extinction. Later, as part of 2022 Born Free’s Year of the Lion celebrations 25 life-size bronze lion sculptures were staged at Newcastle’s Exhibition Park and the exhibition named Born Free Forever.

== New York City Chinatown controversy ==
In 2018 they gained attention and controversy for two public sculptures in New York City.

Gillie and Marc created a sculpture to celebrate the Chinese ‘Year of the Dog’ titled "He knew this was going to be a year of good fortune." The sculpture show their Dogman character holding a very large red apple. One copy was installed in a Melbourne shopping mall, while the other was intended to be unveiled the day before the Lunar New Year in New York City's Chinatown at Kimlau Square, which holds a memorial to Chinese-American World War II veterans.

The Chinatown community prevented the work from being installed. Led by Amy Chin, Special Advisor for Cultural Initiatives of the Chinatown Partnership, the community circulated a petition that said it would have been demeaning to place the statue, “under the Arch named for Lt. Benjamin R. Kimlau,” who died in World War II fighting for the United States. “This insulting image of a ‘Dog-Man’ has no place next to this sacred and solemn community site where we honor our community heroes.” The petition gained more than 300 signatories within the first 24 hours.

Questions have also been raised about the process used to select the project for one of the neighborhood’s most visible public spaces. Karlin Chan, the lone Chinese member of the Parks, Recreation, Cultural Affairs, & Waterfront Committee of Community Board 3, said that the sculpture is reflective of "a well-intentioned but wrong approach." However, Wellington Chen, the head of the LDC, said "Chinatown is the biggest victim. The neighborhood is not as vibrant as it was before. The sculpture was to be placed here to bring tourists in. Now Chinatown is bleeding."

== Personal life ==
Gillie and Marc met in 1990 during a film shoot in Hong Kong, where Gillie was a model and Marc was the creative director. She is Catholic and he is Jewish. They married through a Hindu ceremony seven days later. They have lived in Singapore, New York, and now live in Sydney.
