= Nathaniel Lichfield =

Nathaniel Lichfield (29 February 1916 – 27 February 2009) was a British urban and environmental planner who played a key role in the development of the 1960s new towns. In 1962 he founded the planning consultancy, Nathaniel Lichfield Associates (now Lichfields). His contributions extended over more than 60 years, continuing long after his retirement from University College London (UCL) in 1978. He was recognised by the Royal Town Planning Institute with a lifetime achievement award in 2004.

== Biography ==
Nathaniel Lichfield was born to Jewish immigrants from Poland, Hyman Lichman and Fanny (née Grecht), in the East End of London. The family home was shared with relatives where no English was spoken. He suffered from poor eyesight forcing him to sit at the front bench at school and he was advised to avoid reading books. Despite this he ignored medical advice and at the age of 13 he won the top academic prize and the Victor Ludorum cup at the Raine's Foundation School, in Bethnal Green, East London.

Lichfield suffered from tuberculosis and this forced him to leave school. Two years of recuperation were required before he took a job in a local estate agency where strenuous work that would aggravate his condition was unnecessary. He found the work intellectually unchallenging and left for a full-time job with Davidge and Partners, a town-planning consultancy. During this period he also took evening classes in estate management. He later studied for a BSc degree in the subject and subsequently received a fellowship at the Royal Institution of Chartered Surveyors.

In the 1930s he became deeply involved with the socialist and anti-fascist movement in the East End. He participated in the Battle of Cable Street against Oswald Mosley's Blackshirts in October 1936. Poor health however prevented him from joining the International Brigades in the Spanish Civil War and from undertaking military service in the WWII.

His pioneerings PhD thesis and subsequently the book based on it, The Economics of Planned Development (1956), was a study of the economic evaluation of planning projects. This formed the foundation for his subsequent work on social cost-benefit analysis. This breakthrough work came before the first applications of cost-benefit to transport planning in the late 1950s and early 1960s and therefore made him a leading presence in this field.

Lichfield was also involved in local government, working in municipal engineering and planning. From there he moved to central government and the Ministry of Town and Country Planning (From 1951 this was renamed the Ministry of Housing and Local Government). Within the ministry Lichfield became a leading member of a small group that worked to accelerate the pace of change towards the findings of the Schuster report of 1950, which recommended transformation of planning education through inclusion of the social sciences of economics, geography and sociology. In the early 1950s he was also a founder-member of the Land Use Society, a discussion and dining club of civil servants, academics and private-sector developers. Later in 1965, he played a similar role in helping to launch the Regional Studies Association, which promoted research in new disciplines and their application to planning practice.

In 1959–60 Lichfield took leave from the ministry to become a postdoctoral research fellow at the University of California, Berkeley. There he further developed some of the key ideas from his PhD to the form of the Planning Balance Sheet, which was later retitled Community Impact Evaluation.

In 1962 he founded the consultancy partnership, Nathaniel Lichfield Associates (now Lichfields), which became an almost indispensable part of many professional planning teams in the period of British planning covering the construction of the second wave of new towns, including Milton Keynes and Peterborough, in the late 1960s.

In 1962 University of California offered him a full professorship in the College of Environmental Design. He received a rival offer from the Wharton School of Finance at the University of Pennsylvania. He chose however to return to work in Britain when Richard Llewelyn-Davies, the founder of the Bartlett School of Architecture and Design at University College London offered him a Professorship there.

In 1966 he was also appointed to the new chair in the Economics of Environmental Planning at UCL.

Returning to Britain in his new position allowed him to pursue his research and teaching at UCL in parallel with the development of his specialist consultancy, Nathaniel Lichfield Associates. Together with other leading academics he played an important role in the planning of Milton Keynes. He was also involved the creation of the original masterplan for Peterborough new town, which was headed by the young master-planner Tom Hancock.

In the late 1960s and early 70s, Lichfield combined his parallel academic and professional responsibilities with a variety of public roles. He served as the president of the Royal Town Planning Institute in 1966. He also served as:

- Chairman of the planning committee of the Social Science Research Council;
- A member of the Urban Motorways Committee; and,
- A member of the South East Economic Planning Council.

In 1968 he was invited by Israel's Ministry of Housing and Development to advise on the countries approach to planning (within the 1948 borders). His week-long visit was managed by the minister's planning adviser, Dalia Kadury. The following year, following the death of Lichfield's first wife, Rachel Goulden, he and Dalia were married.

In the 1990s he was a member of the Council of the Urban Villages Forum. There he helped to develop key ideas that proved influential, not only in Britain – to the development concept at Poundbury, in Dorset – but more widely in the United States, in the New Urbanist movement. He founded a new partnership, Lichfield Planning, with his wife Dalia in 1992.

In his later years he served on the following boards:

- Council for National Academic Awards (as a member of its estate management, building economics and land-use board);
- Council of the Tavistock Institute of Human Relations;
- National Economic Development Office (On the shopping capacity sub-committee).

In 2002, aged 86, he received the DSc degree for his cumulative achievement from UCL.

== Works ==
- Lichfield, N.; Kettle, P. & Whitbread, N. (1975) – Evaluation in the Planning Process;
- Lichfield, N.; Darin-Drabkin, H. (1980) – Land Policy in Planning
- Lichfield, N. (1996) – Community Impact Evaluation.
- 1976: with Alan Proudlove "Conservation and Traffic: A Case Study of York" York: Sessions Book Trust.(Review)
