= Dundee Wharf =

Residential development in Limehouse, London, England

Coordinates: 51°30′28.44″N 0°1′51.60″W

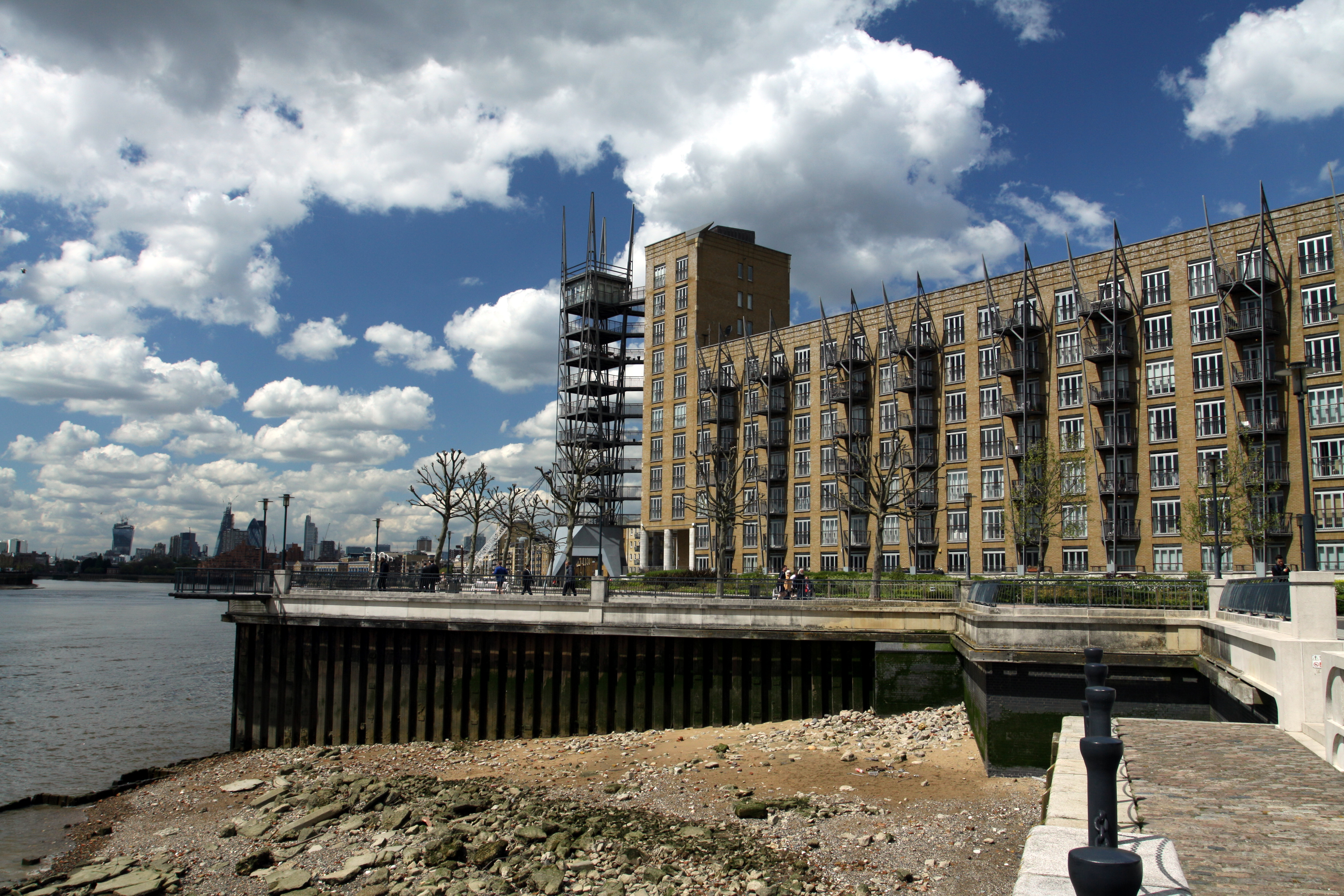
View to the Dundee Wharf with River Thames

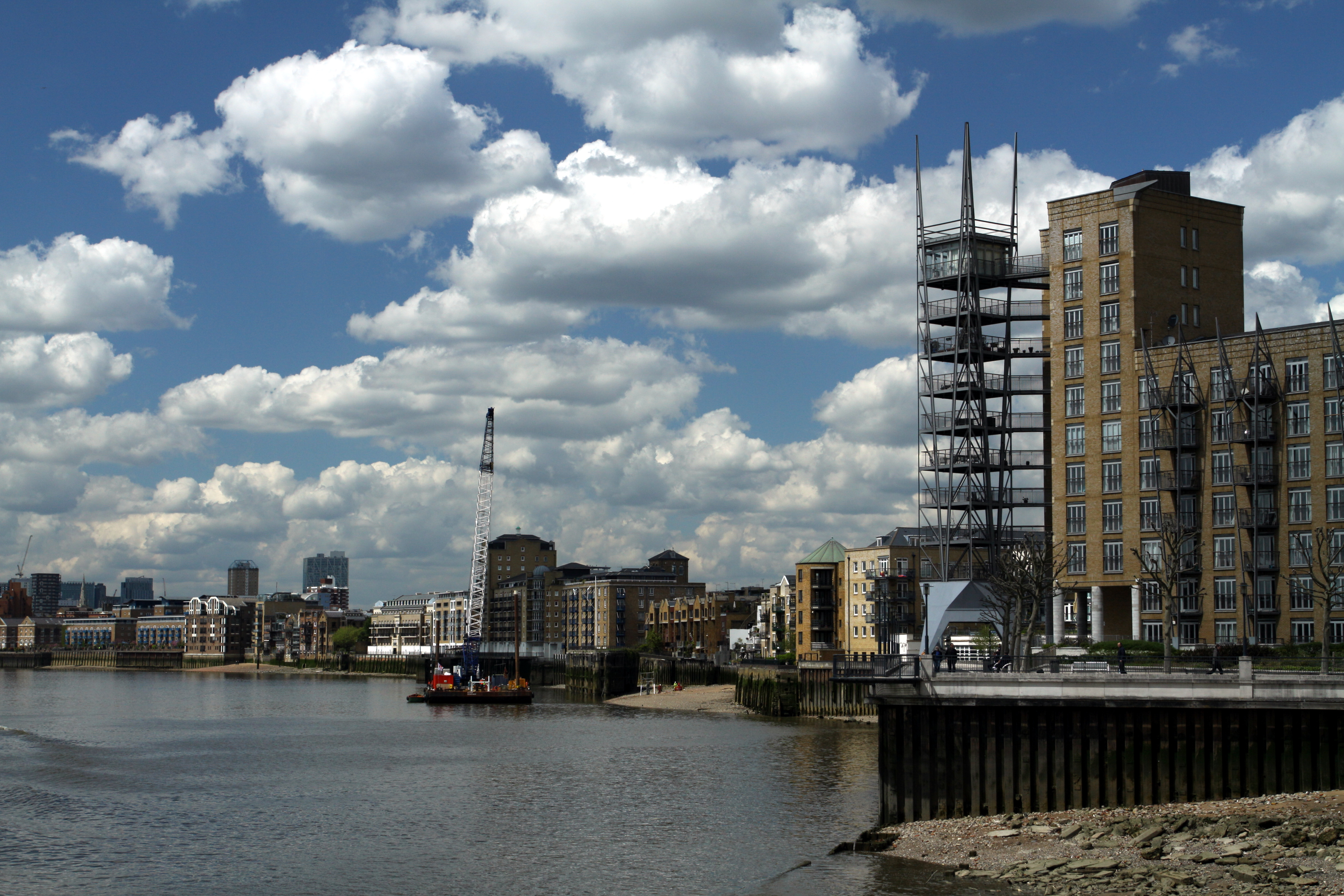
Detail to the tower

Dundee Wharf is a residential development in Limehouse in the London Borough of Tower Hamlets in London. The modern buildings occupy the site of a former shipyard known as Limekiln Dockyard. John Graves established this shipyard in 1633 and then expanded his holdings with Dundee Wharf itself. By 1650 George Margetts developed a ropemaking yard including a ropehouse, storehouse and a ropewalk on the site. A modern wharf with electric cranes was constructed in the 1930s. This was used by the Dundee, Perth & London Shipping Company to operate a twice-weekly service between Perth, Dundee, Leith and London.

The wharf was destroyed during the blitz and reconstructed in the 1950s, going out of use in 1969. After demolition for construction of the Limehouse Link the current residential development by architects CZWG was built.

Dundee Wharf has a prominent position on the River Thames. It was built in 1997 by Ballymore Properties to designs by the architect Piers Gough, a partner at Campbell Zogolvich Wiltinson and Gough (CZWG). Gough additionally designed the bridge over Limekiln Dock.

The name Limehouse comes from the lime oasts in Limekiln Dock in the 14th century and used to produce quick lime for building mortar. Pottery manufacture followed. In 1660 Samuel Pepys visited a porcelain factory in Duke's Shore. Limekiln Wharf was established in 1740 as England's first soft past porcelain factory. Industry moved into building barges and thrived well into the 19th century.

Dundee Wharf is on the embankment known as the Dunbars. Dundee, Aberdeen, Caledonia and Dunbar Wharves were owned by Dundee Perth and London Shipping Company. Their office building stands today adjacent to the entrance to Dundee Wharf. In 1835 their passenger paddle steamers SS London and SS Perth carried passengers on a twice-weekly service to Dundee, Scotland. A first class cabin cost 42 shillings and sixpence. More or less opposite the main entrance were banana warehouses, to the right River Plate Wharf. The river ferry from Limehouse Pier left from Limehouse Stairs. Prior to its demolition Dundee Wharf was a "massive fortress like warehouse" trading in general goods. The air was scented by the juniper berries used for the manufacture of London gin and stored at St Dunstan's Wharf on the opposite side of Limekiln. The Lockett Wilson was the last vessel that regularly used Dundee Wharf; it plied its trade between Dundee Wharf and up the Seine to Paris.

The first voluntary emigrants to Australia left from the Dunbars – the involuntary emigrants from Wapping Old Stairs.
