= Richard Hudson (sculptor) =

British sculptor (born 1954)

- Born: Richard Hudson; 1954 (age 71–72); Worcestershire (UK)
- Known for: sculpture
- Movement: Contemporary Visual Arts

Richard Hudson (born 1954, Yorkshire, United Kingdom) is a British sculptor whose organic sculptures are shown internationally and collected widely.

== Biography ==
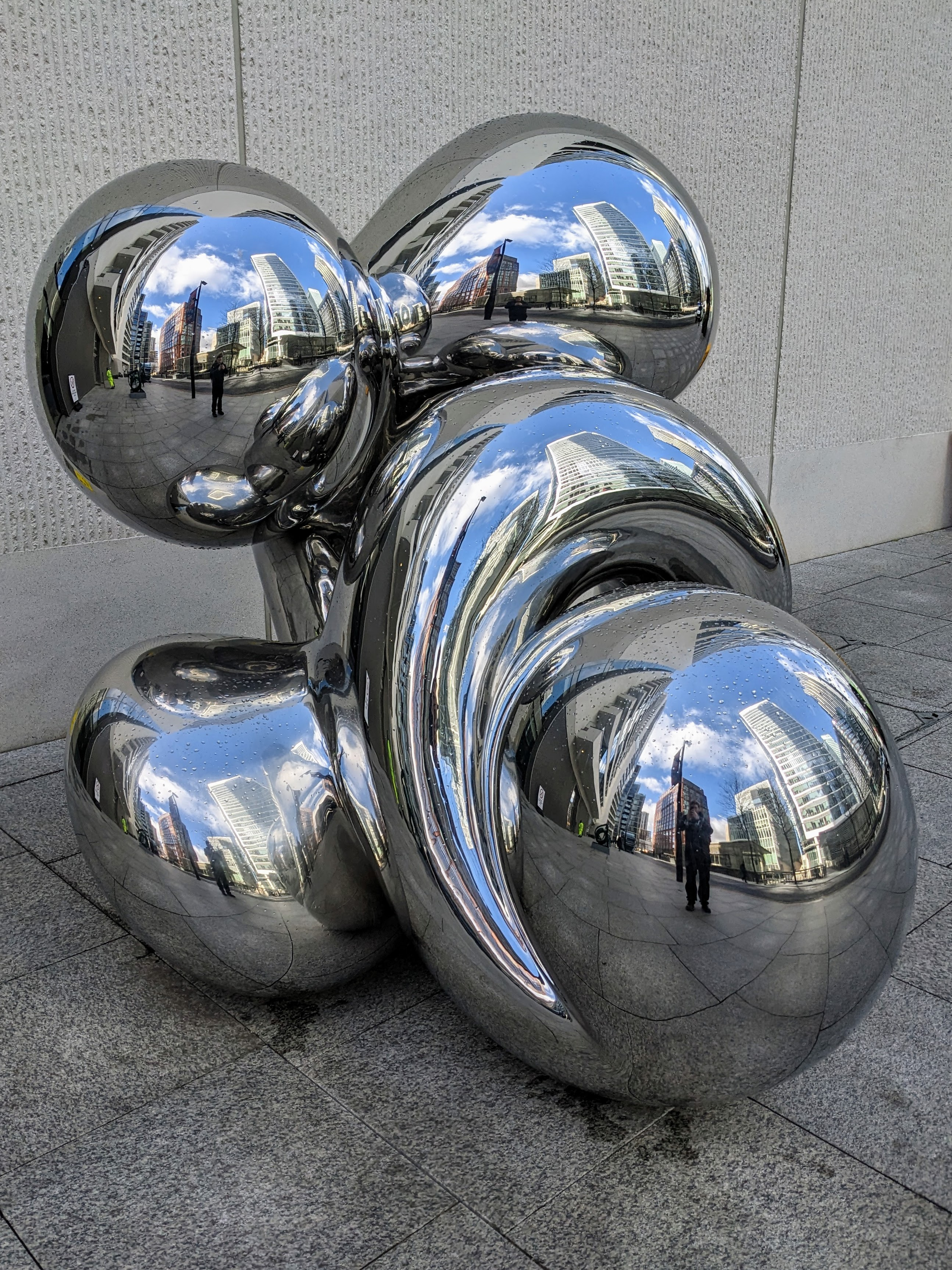
The Knot by Richard Hudson (2017) Canary Wharf, London

He began working with sculpture at a relatively late age after many years of traveling. He is best known for his work in polished mirrored steel, bronze and marble with a number of Monumental works on public display.

His "work on the female figure but has of late worked with an abstract expression. His soft lines and voluptuous, nearly bombastic style combined with inspiration from Modernism’s great names like Henry Moore, Jean Arp and Constantin Brancusi rocketed his career forward."

His son, Henry Hudson, is also an artist.

== Artwork ==
Hudson's sculptures often are formed from iconic abstractions of the female form. One of Hudson's well known sculptures is of Marilyn Monroe. He stated, "Line is the most important thing to me, the continuity of it ... I like sculptures that flow." Ana Pettus commissioned a Marilyn Monroe sculpture.

== Personal life ==
As of 2015, Hudson lived and worked in Madrid.
