= The Last Three (sculpture) =

Sculpture by Gillie and Marc

- Artist: Gillie and Marc
- Medium: Bronze sculpture
- Subject: Northern white rhinoceros
- Location: San Antonio Zoo, San Antonio, Texas, U.S.

The Last Three is a 17 foot tall bronze sculpture depicting the last three Northern white rhinoceros by Gillie and Marc. The art-critic Jerry Saltz called the work "a Kitschy Monstrosity," saying it was "an ugly, bathos-filled folly that proves my adage that 95 percent of all public sculpture is crap" and "little more than a place to take selfies." It is installed at the San Antonio Zoo, as of 2018.
