= Raine's House =

Building in Wapping, London, England

Coordinates: 51°30′24″N 0°03′29″W

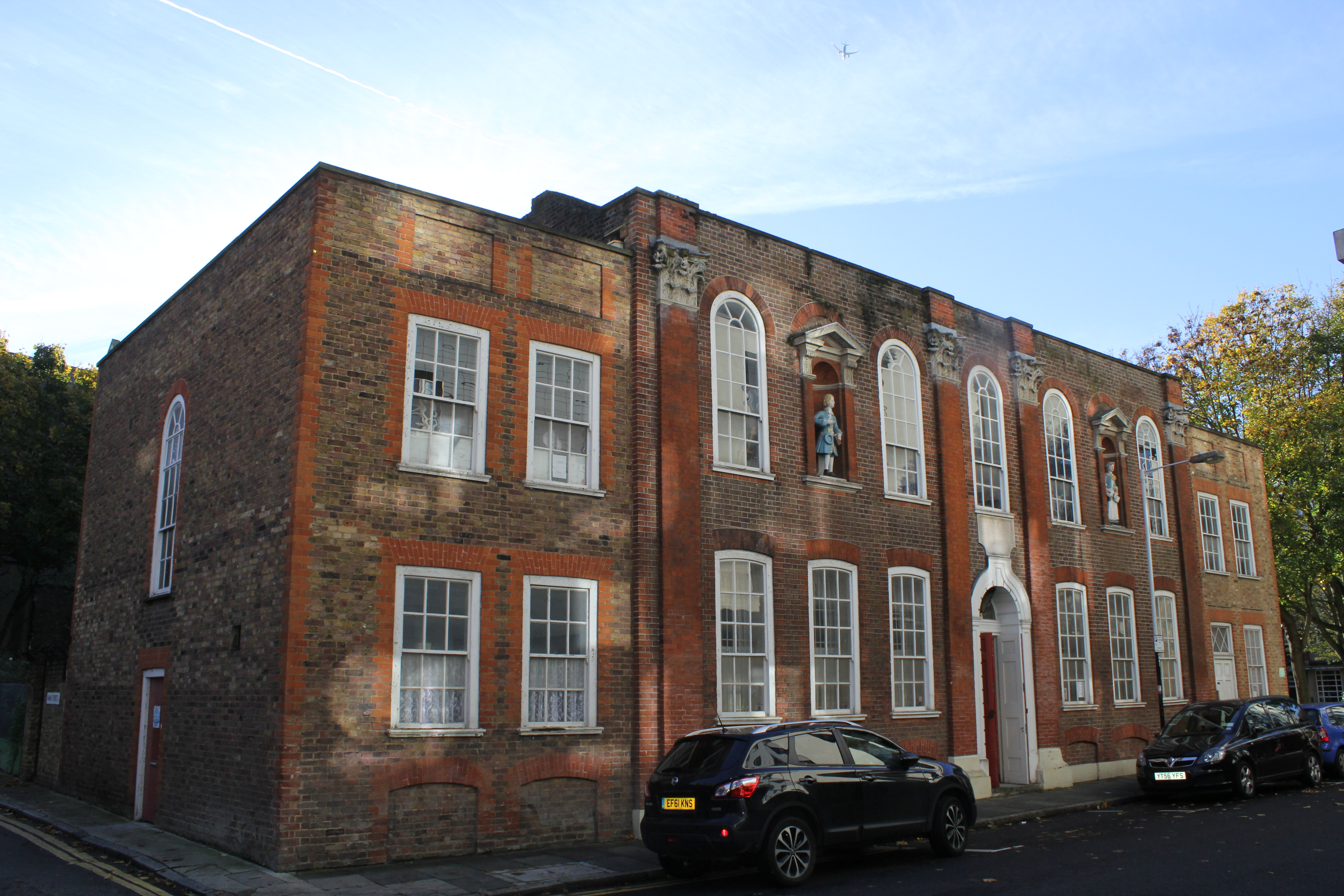
Raine's House, London

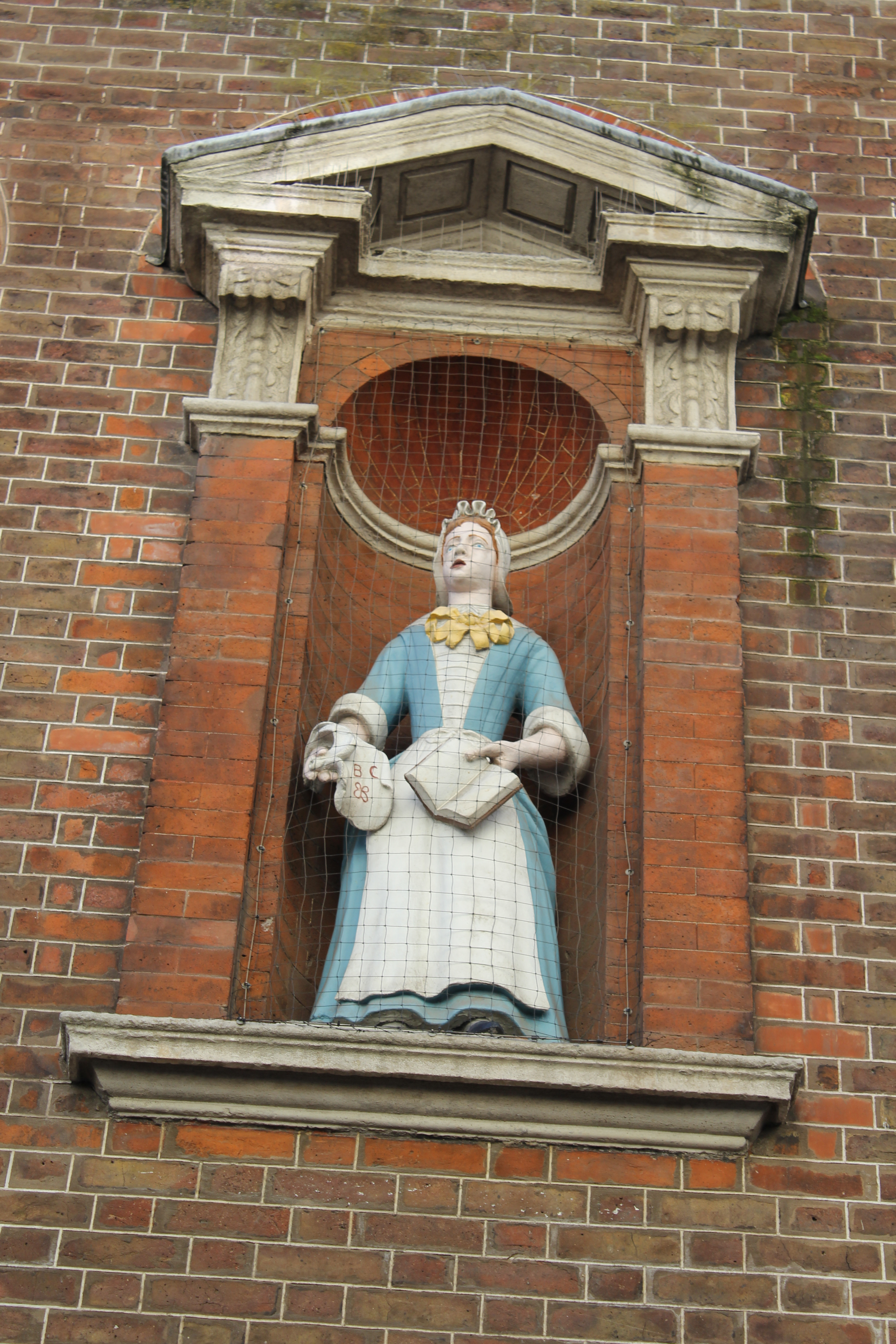
Replica of original statue

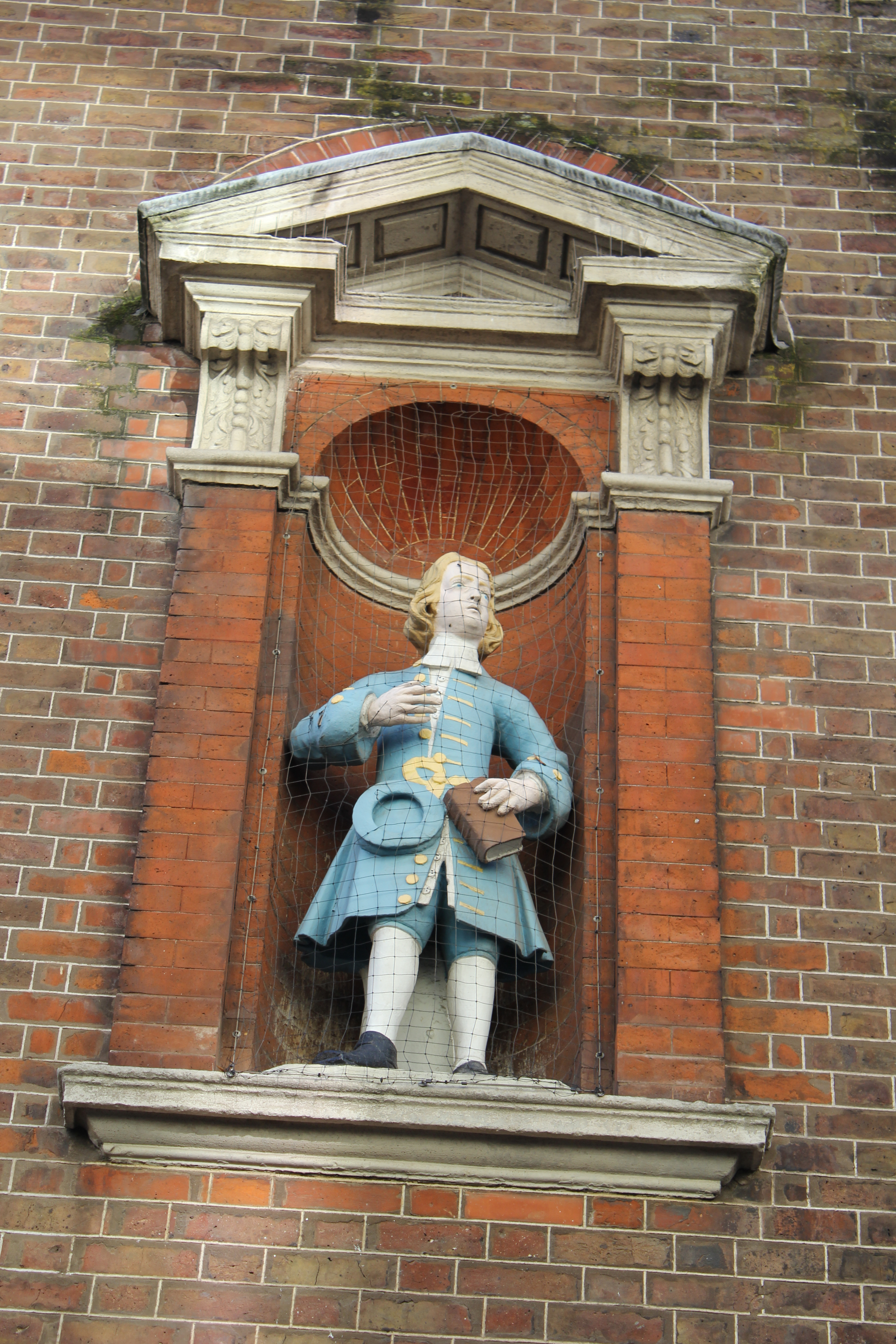
Replica of original statue

Raine's House, sometimes called Raine House, is a Grade II* listed house in Raine Street, Wapping, London E1. This listing recognises the building's special architectural or historic interest.

== History ==
This structure was built in 1719, and founded as a charity school by Henry Raine (1679–1738), who had made a large sum of money from selling alcohol. As a devout Christian, he felt that he should be philanthropic, and decided to found a school where poor children could get a free education. This school was built in the neighbourhood where he lived and he named it "the Lower School". It originally accommodated 50 boys and 50 girls.

In recent years, this building has been used as a community centre, and as offices of the Academy of St. Martin in the Fields. The original school moved, and is now called the Raine's Foundation School, on Approach Road, Bethnal Green.

== Physical features ==
The building has a baroque front, with giant pilasters. There is a stone plaque over the door, at the center of the building: "Come in & learn your duty to God & man. 1719".

Two of the window openings on the second floor have pedimented niches. Those niches were originally occupied by two contemporary figures of a boy and a girl, but they and other original objects from the school were moved when the school moved, and they are still preserved. The niches are now filled by replicas.
