= Michael Kenny (sculptor) =

English painter (1941–1999)

Michael Kenny RA (1941 – 28 December 1999) was a British artist. Best known as a sculptor, he also made important reliefs and drawings as well as sculptural constructions in wood and metal.

== Brief Biography ==
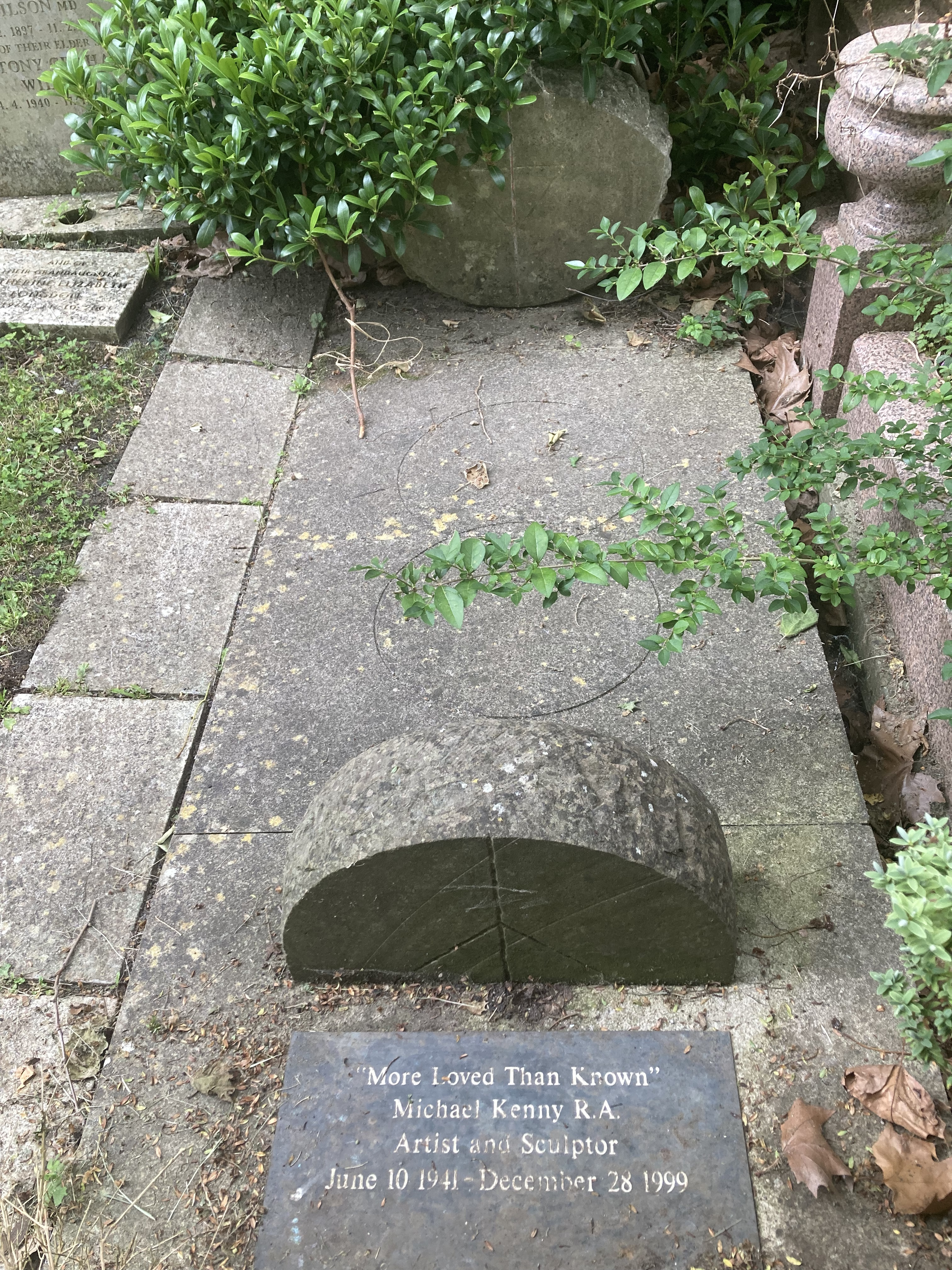
Grave of Michael Kenny in Highgate Cemetery

Having studied at Liverpool College of Art and then Slade School of Fine Art, Kenny taught at Slade 1970-1982 and at Goldsmiths School of Art 1983–88. He was made a Royal Academician in 1986 and completed many public commissions and exhibitions including retrospectives at Wilhelm-Lehmbruck Museum, Duisburg (1984), Hansard Gallery in Southampton (1990), and Dulwich Picture Gallery (1994) following a residency there from 1992 to 1993. He died on 28 December 1999. He is buried on the eastern side of Highgate Cemetery in London.

== Early life ==
Born in 1941, Kenny had a Jesuit education, going on to study at the Liverpool College of Art (1959–61). He continued his studies at Slade School of Fine Art (1961–64) under the supervision of sculptor Reginald Butler, who referred to young Kenny as "the Liverpool Italian" due to his fascination for the works of Giacometti and the vast plaster structures he was creating at the time.

During the 1970s he lectured at Slade; and he headed the department of Fine Arts at Goldsmiths College from 1983 to 1988. In 1995 he took the position of Principal of the London City and Guilds Art School. He was a widely recognised British sculptors during the 1980s and 1990s, and his robust geometric stonework won special attention. He became a Royal Academy of Arts Associate in 1976 and joined the list of Royal Academicians in 1986. In 1993, Kenny became artist-in-residence at the Dulwich Picture Gallery in south London.

== Exhibitions of his work ==
Kenny's first one-man show was in 1964 at Oxford's Bear Lane Gallery, and in 1978 he exhibited at Annely Juda. In 1964, he won an award Littlewoods Sculptural Design Competition and he received major awards from the Arts Council in 1975, 1977 and 1980. His work is widely. Collections are held at the British Museum, the RA, The Tate Gallery, the V&A, the Arts Council of Great Britain, the British Council, Leeds City Art Gallery, Bath's Quest Gallery and the Walker Art Gallery, Liverpool. Michael Kenny has been exhibited across Europe, US, Middle East and Asia; and his work is increasingly sought after by collectors. Indeed, his work is particularly recognised in Japan following various exhibitions and installations. He completed a collection of eight paintings inspired by the Ryōan-ji Zen Garden in Kyoto, illustrating Kenny's use of charcoal, right-leaning symmetry and a bleed of pink cherry blossom. One of his sculptures remains on public display in Yokohama, Japan.

== Motifs and meaning ==
Throughout his life, Kenny's work addressed the isolation of the human condition, expressed often through the seated or reclining female figure, abstracted and depersonalised, touching landscape and geometry; often incorporating devices such as plumb-lines evoking a science and accuracy within the emotive shapes. Due to its location, probably Kenny's widest viewed work is his 1992 sculpture – On Strange And Distant Islands – a 25 ft high lateral relief spanning 150 ft of wall above London's busy Limehouse Link tunnel eastern portal, carved from 70 tons of Kilkenny limestone.

His last series of drawings – The Stations of The Cross – encapsulate the full range of his imagery and references and, according to Professor Brian Falconbridge at a major exhibition of Kenny's work at the Quest Gallery in Bath, rank as one of the finest examples of religious art within the Christian tradition made since the Reformation. Acquired by the Royal Academy in 1998, the 14 powerful mixed-media drawings represent a modern interpretation of a pilgrimage of the mind, in which the 14 moments of Christ's Passion are captured in time.
