= King Edward VII Jewish Memorial Drinking Fountain =

Drinking fountain in Whitechapel, London

Coordinates: 51°31′09″N 0°03′37″W

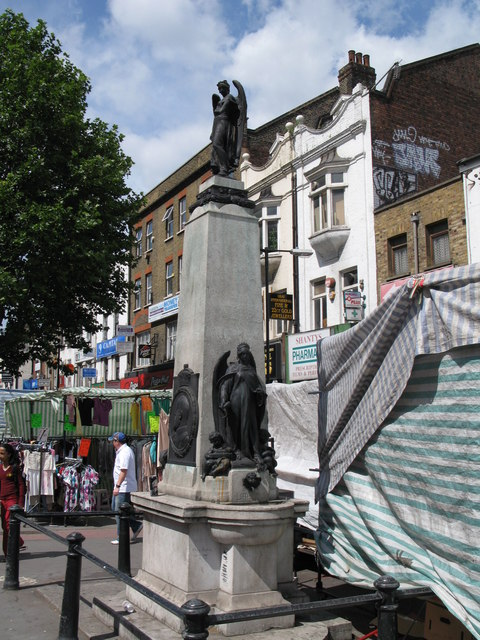
The King Edward VII Jewish Memorial Drinking Fountain in 2008

The King Edward VII Jewish Memorial Drinking Fountain is a drinking fountain on Whitechapel Road in the Whitechapel area located in the London Borough of Tower Hamlets.

A plaque on the fountain records that it was erected "from subscriptions raised from Jewish inhabitants of East London" in memory of Edward VII. The idea for the memorial was conceived by the writer Annie Gertrude Landa. It was unveiled on 15 March 1912 by Charles Rothschild. The figures are the work of the sculptor William Silver Frith.

The fountain is made from white stone with a tapered central square pillar. The pillar is surmounted by a bronze angel, with bronze figures of the Angel of Peace, the Angel of Liberty and the figure of Justice and cherubs on the faces of the pillar.

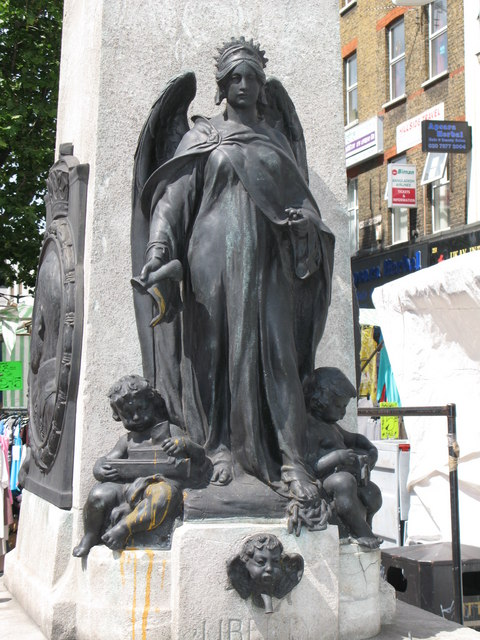
The figure of Liberty with cherubs holding a ship and a book

Each of the cherubs holds an object of significance to the Jewish community at the time of the memorial's unveiling. One cherub holds a ship; many members of the local Jewish community were recent immigrants. A cherub holding a needle and thread signifies the clothing industry which employed the majority of the East End Jewish community until the 1970s. A book is held by another cherub signifying the importance of education to the community both from the local secular Jewish schools and the schools of Talmudic study. A car held by a cherub shows the increasing pace of modernity and the shift away from the horse and cart in modern London. The remaining face bears a relief portrait of the King wearing the Order of the Garter.

The fountain was listed at Grade II on the National Heritage List for England in September 1973.

Michael McNay, writing in the Hidden Treasures of London, describes the memorial fountain as sitting "in the ethnic Asian community today as naturally as the exotic and overweening architecture of Mumbai, built on the high tide of the British Raj, suits the gateway of India".

In August 2015 the memorial was covered with pieces of red meat and chicken in what the Evening Standard described as an "apparent anti-Semitic attack". The incident was reported to police who launched an investigation; workers from Tower Hamlets Council were sent to clean the memorial.
