= Limehouse Link tunnel =

Road tunnel under Limehouse in East London

Limehouse Link
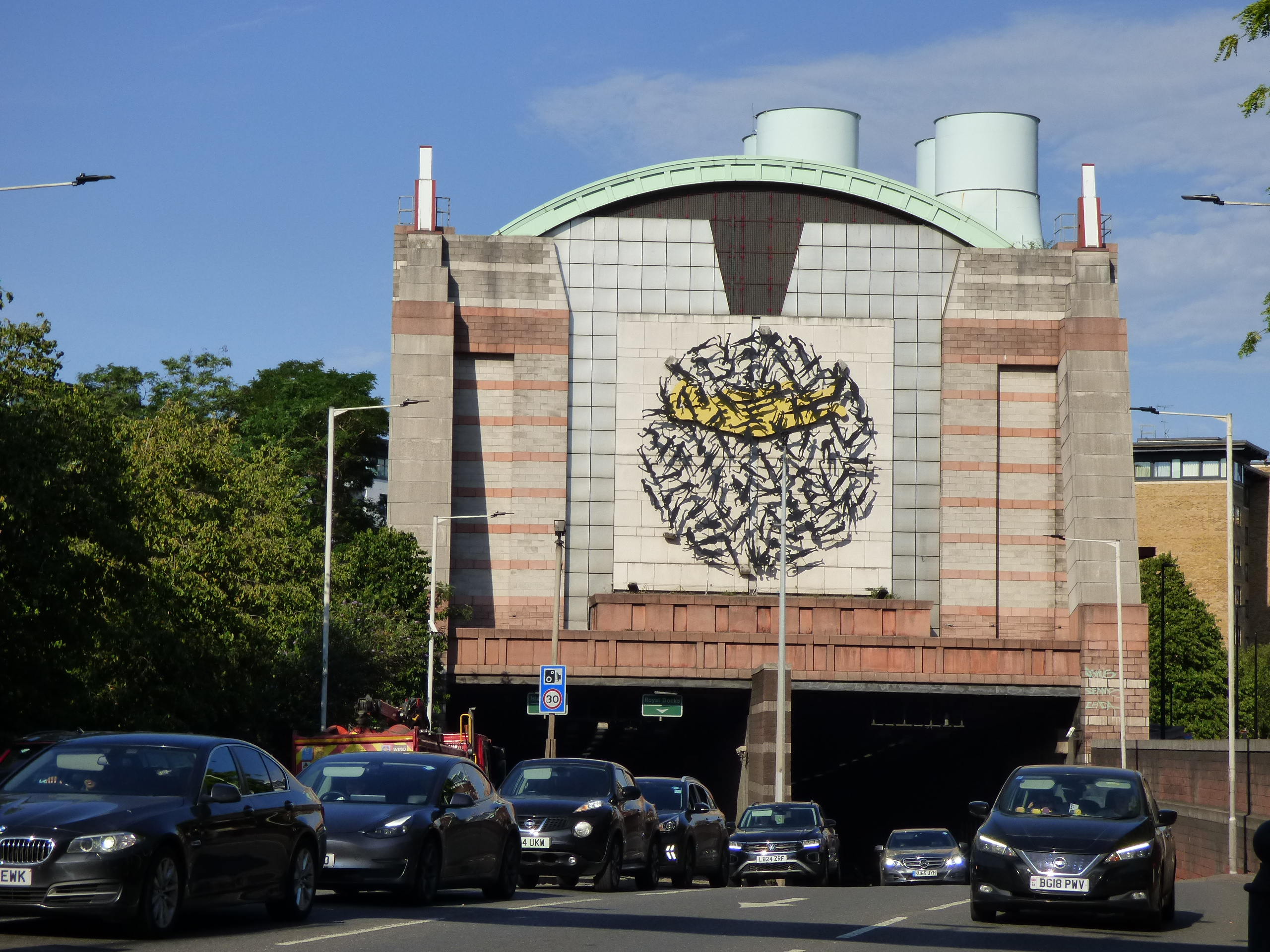
- The western portal of the Limehouse Link tunnel
- Interactive map of Limehouse Link

Overview
- Location: London Docklands
- Coordinates: 51.511°N 0.033°W
- Status: Active
- Route: A1203 road
- Start: Limehouse
- End: Limehouse

Operation
- Work began: 1989
- Opened: 1993
- Operator: Transport for London

Technical
- Operating speed: 30mph

The Limehouse Link tunnel is a 1.1-mile (1.8 km) long tunnel under Limehouse in East London on the A1203 road. The tunnel links the eastern end of The Highway to Canary Wharf in London Docklands. Built between 1989 and 1993 at a cost of £293,000,000 it has been calculated as the most expensive road scheme in Britain per mile, working out at £50,500 per foot at 2011 prices. It is the second largest non-estuarial road tunnel in the UK, after the Hindhead Tunnel in Surrey.

== History ==
During the early 1980s, it was clear that the existing road infrastructure serving the London Docklands development zone had no spare capacity, and the Limehouse Link formed the western part of improvements proposed by the London Docklands Development Corporation. Planning started in 1986, the designers were Sir Alexander Gibb & Partners. The design of the tunnel approaches and portal buildings was carried out by Anthony Meats and Rooney O'Carroll Architects as part of an overall consultancy on the LDDC highway infrastructure programme. Construction began in November 1989 and the tunnel project was officially opened in May 1993. At the time it was the second biggest engineering project in Europe after the Channel Tunnel.

== Construction ==
Balfour Beatty and Amec formed a joint venture to build the tunnel. Called 'Balfour Beatty Fairclough Joint Venture', the project involved five million man hours over 193 weeks.

== Description ==
The tunnel is actually twin parallel tunnels built by the cut-and-cover method, with the tunnels under waterways built bottom-up behind temporary cofferdam walls. The western portal of the tunnel is at the eastern end of The Highway (A1203), just east of its junction with Butcher Row. The access roads from the Highway into the tunnel run adjacent to the access roads to the Rotherhithe Tunnel for a short distance; the northern portal of that tunnel lies just north of the Link tunnel entrance. Heading east, the tunnel passes under the north side of Limehouse Basin, turns south-east to pass underneath Limekiln Dock and Dundee Wharf close to the embankment walls of the River Thames before turning north-east under Westferry Road. The eastern portal to the tunnel, emerging onto the A1261 Aspen Way, is just north of the Canary Wharf development, near West India Quay DLR station. Through the Blackwall area, the eastern extremity of Aspen Way includes a flyover crossing of a roundabout close to the line of the twin tunnels of the Blackwall Tunnel.

The tunnel has a 30 miles per hour (48 km/h) speed limit, enforced by SpeedCurb speed cameras above the carriageway at the tunnel entrances, exits and inside the tunnel.

The Limehouse Link tunnel is notable for including slip roads to and from Westferry Road towards the eastern end of the twin tunnels. Complex ground conditions and the need to avoid several key existing structures including other tunnels and a river basin increased costs.

New radio and loudspeaker public address systems were installed in early 2008.

=== Art ===
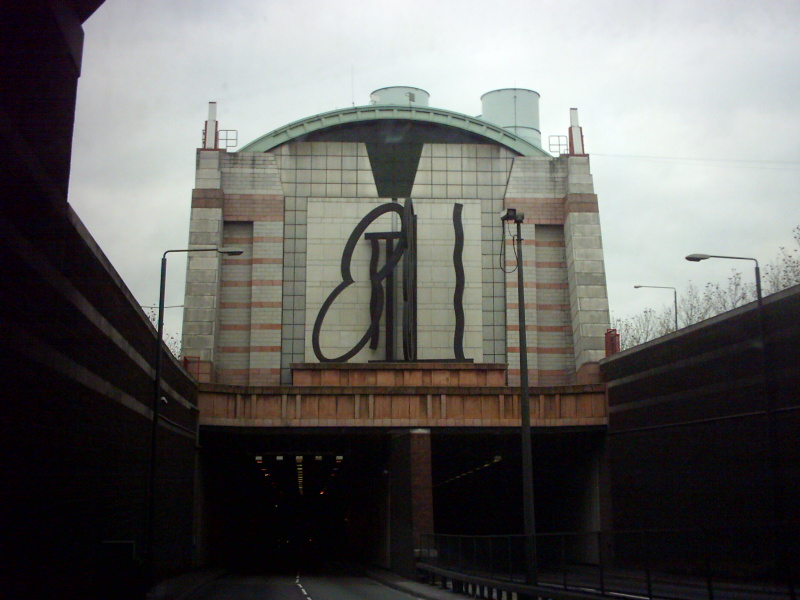
The eastern portal of the Limehouse Link tunnel.

The tunnel structures feature substantial works of public art. The western portal has Zadok Ben-David's circle of silhouettes, Restless Dream. The eastern portal has an untitled abstract by Nigel Hall. The eastern services building (Westferry Road) has artwork commissioned from UK artist and sculptor Michael Kenny (1941–1999), a relief work in Kilkenny limestone called On Strange And Distant Islands.

=== Sport ===
The tunnel is closed to road traffic and used by runners in The Big Half, an annual half marathon held on a Sunday morning in early September.
