= Wellington Chen =

American community leader

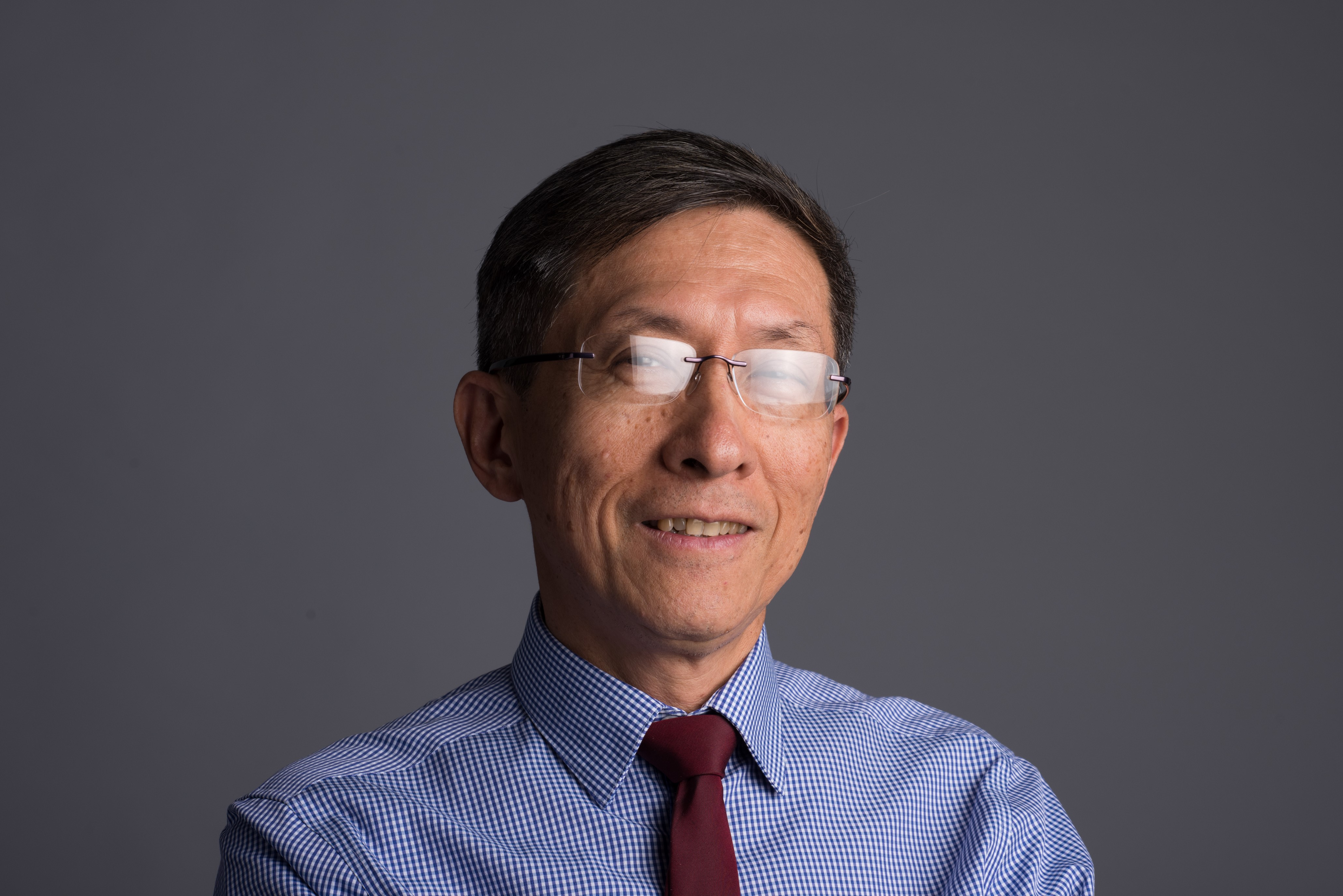
Chen in 2016

Wellington Chen serves as the executive director of the Chinatown Partnership Local Development Corporation in New York City. He is responsible for guiding the overall direction of the Chinatown Partnership, including strategic planning, setting policy, and serving as the public representative of the organization.

Chen is also a former commissioner of the NYC Board of Standards and Appeals and has been routinely referred to as a resource regarding economic growth in New York's Chinatowns. In January 2005, Chen was interviewed by Center for an Urban Future on prospects for economic growth in Flushing, New York, a high Asian population district in the Borough of Queens. In the interview Chen highlighted the importance of engaging the Borough of Queens in economic growth: "If the county of Queens were to become a city, it would be the fifth largest city in the United States. It's larger than Houston. This country used to think on a very different level. The two World's Fairs generated each time over 50 million visitors. We used to think on a global level. We used to compete on a global level. We need to get back on that mold."

Chen's programs as executive director of Chinatown Partnership is regarded was a major aspect of Chinatown's reforms and economic growth, and Chen was interviewed by NY1 in May 2009 regarding reflections on his personal and professional history.

An architect by training, Wellington worked for renowned architect I.M. Pei from 1980 to 1985. He has been a member of Community Board 7Q for over 13 years, and, currently serves on a number of boards, including the Coro NY Leadership Center, the Metropolitan Museum of Art, the NYC Landmarks Preservation Commission, NYC Regional Economic Development Council, and YMCA of Greater New York. Wellington was born in Taiwan and grew up in Singapore, Hong Kong and Brazil.
