= Traffic Light Tree =

Sculpture by Pierre Vivant

Coordinates: 51°30′25″N 0°00′38″W

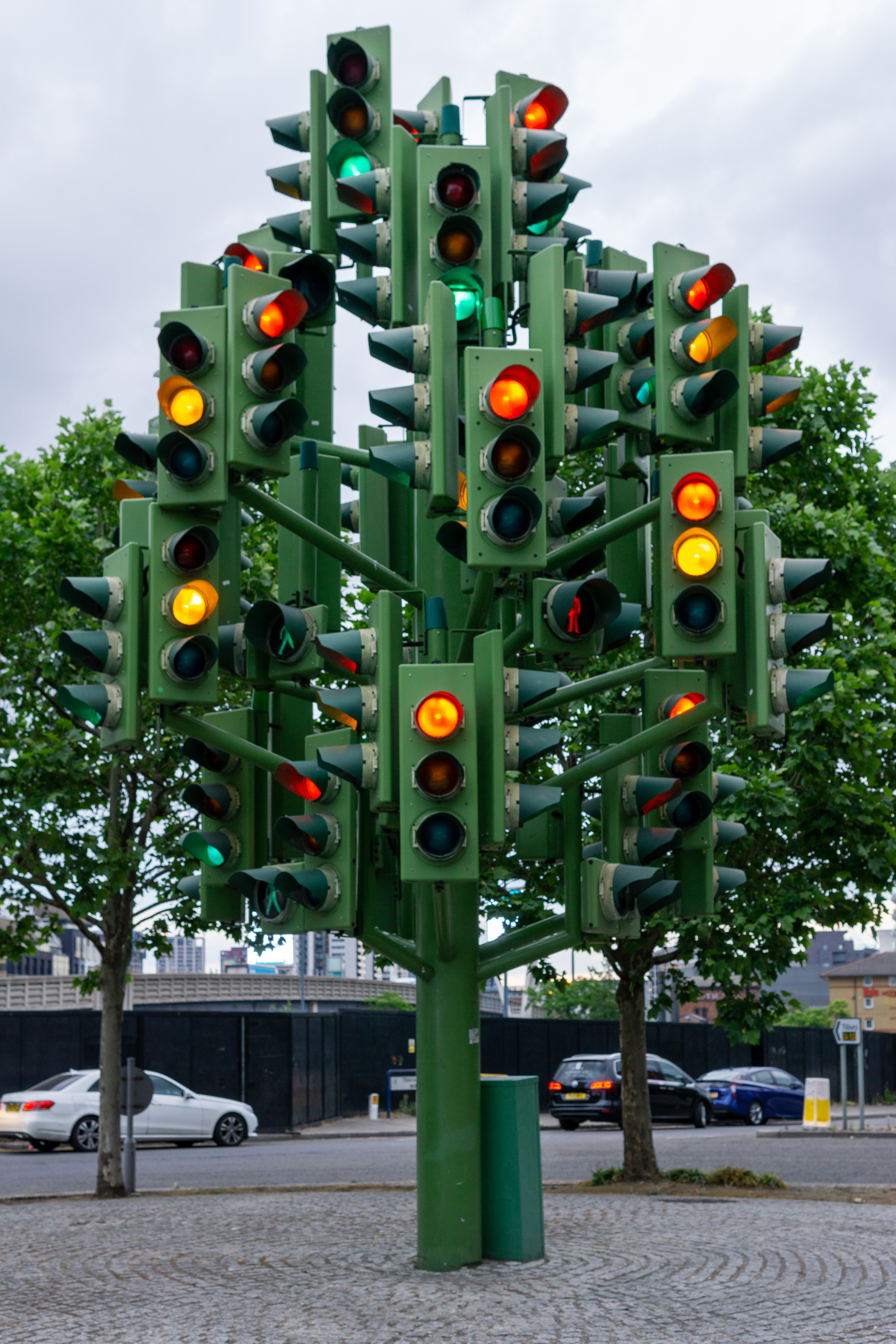
- Pierre Vivant's Traffic Light Tree in its current location on the Trafalgar Way roundabout
- Artist: Pierre Vivant
- Year: 1998
- Location: London, England

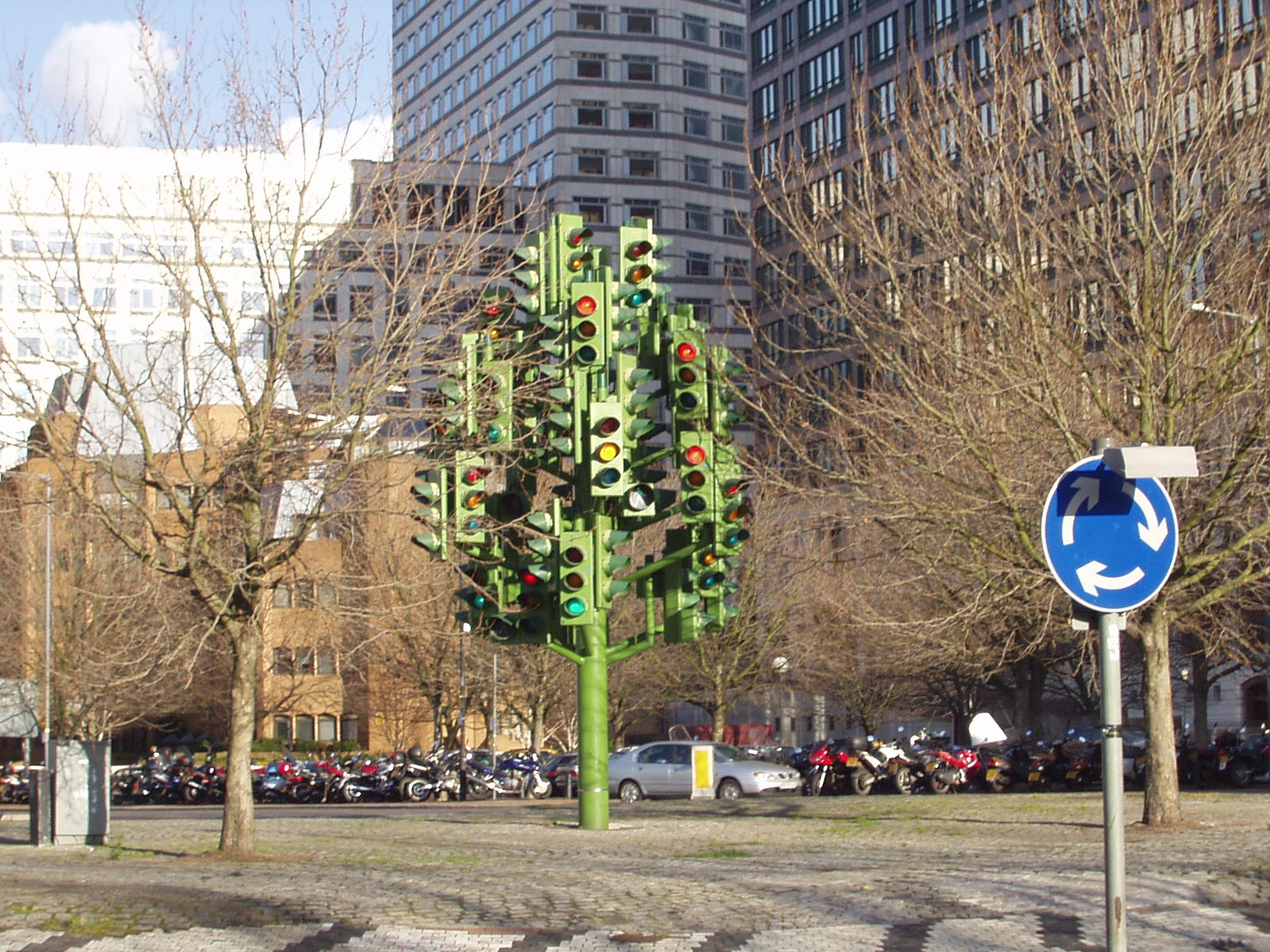
Traffic Light Tree in its original location, without visible control cabinet

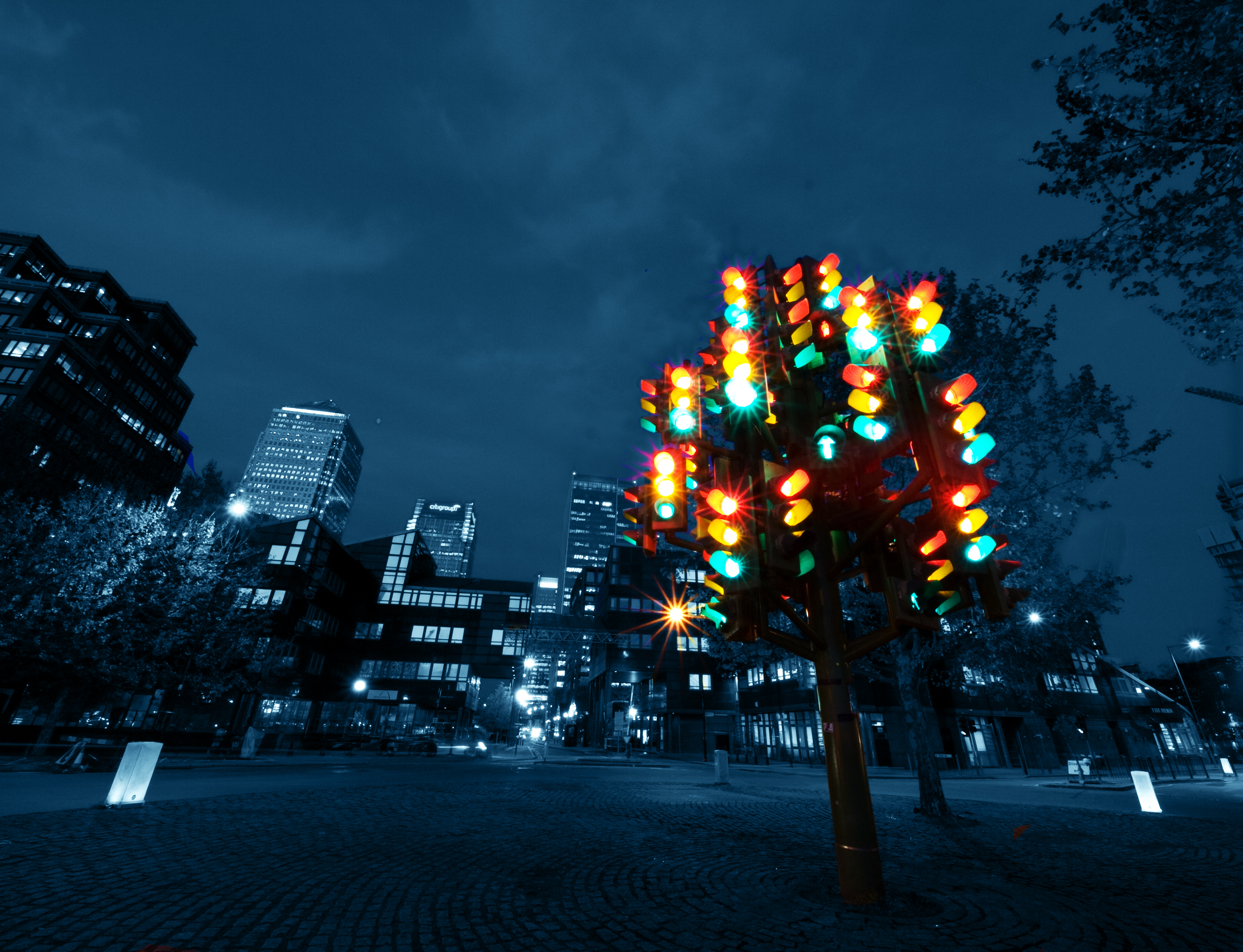
A photograph taken with a slow shutter speed to show all of the sculpture's lights illuminated

A video showing a 1¼-minute sequence of the lights

Traffic Light Tree is a public sculpture in between Poplar and Blackwall, London, England, created by the French sculptor Pierre Vivant following a competition run by the Public Art Commissions Agency for the London Docklands Development Corporation under their Public Art programme. Originally situated on a roundabout in Canary Wharf, at the junction of Heron Quay, Marsh Wall and Westferry Road, it is now located on a different roundabout near Billingsgate Market in Poplar.

Eight metres tall and containing 75 sets of lights, each controlled by computer, the sculpture was described by Vivant thus:

The Sculpture imitates the natural landscape of the adjacent London Plane Trees, while the changing pattern of the lights reveals and reflects the never ending rhythm of the surrounding domestic, financial and commercial activities.

The Public Art Commissions Agency has said "the arbitrary cycle of light changes is not supposed to mimic the seasonal rhythm of nature, but the restlessness of Canary Wharf."

Traffic Light Tree was installed in 1998 on the site of a plane tree that was suffering as a result of pollution. It was initially intended that the lights would be triggered to reflect flurries of activity on the London Stock Exchange, but this proved to be too expensive to put into practice.

Although some motorists were initially confused by the traffic lights, mistaking them for real signals, the sculpture soon became a favourite among both tourists and locals. In 2005, Saga Motor Insurance commissioned a survey asking British motorists about the best and worst roundabouts in the country. The one containing Traffic Light Tree was the clear favourite.

== Relocation ==
In December 2011, the sculpture was removed from Canary Wharf by the owner, Tower Hamlets Council, as part of remodelling work to the Westferry roundabout. In January 2012, the council stated that the work would remain on the Isle of Dogs, but no specific location was named, although it was reported in early 2013 that a planning application had been received by the council to re-install the piece on the Trafalgar Way roundabout near Billingsgate Market. Re-erection was planned to begin at the Trafalgar Way roundabout on 11 November 2013 and to be completed by 11 December 2013.

There was an official lighting-up ceremony at the new location on 20 January 2014, led by Mayor of Tower Hamlets Lutfur Rahman.

== See also ==
- List of public art in Tower Hamlets
