= King Edward Memorial Park =

Public open space in London, England

Coordinates: 51.5090°N 0.0490°W

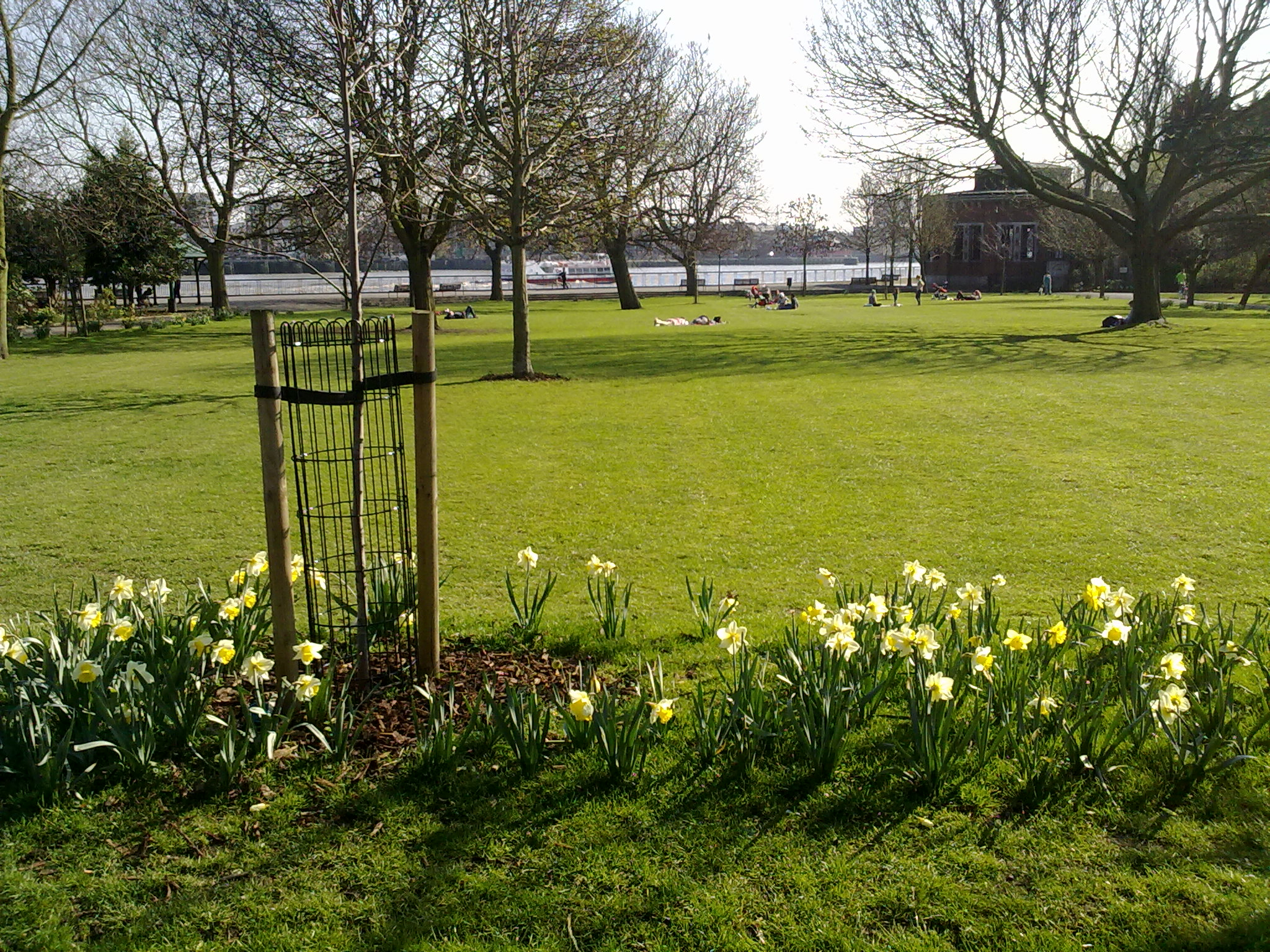

- Location within Greater London
- Sui generis: City of London
- Administrative area: Greater London
- Region: London
- Country: England
- Sovereign state: United Kingdom
- Police: City of London
- Fire: London
- Ambulance: London
- UK Parliament: Poplar and Limehouse
- London Assembly: City and East

King Edward Memorial Park is a public open space in the London Borough of Tower Hamlets, on the northern bank of the River Thames.

It was opened in 1922 in memory of King Edward VII. With an area of 3.3 hectares, it is the 11th largest park in Tower Hamlets. Along with a few others in the borough, it has received the Green Flag Award for quality, and is considered to have good biodiversity value.

The park includes a bandstand, waterfront benches, children's play area, bowling green, all weather football pitch and tennis courts. The paths and public toilets are accessible to wheelchair users. The Thames Path passes through the park.

== History ==
In May 1533, Sir Hugh Willoughby set off with three ships, from the site of the current park, in search for the Northeast Passage to India. A stone and plaque placed near the listed Rotherhithe Rotunda commemorate Willoughby's enterprise.

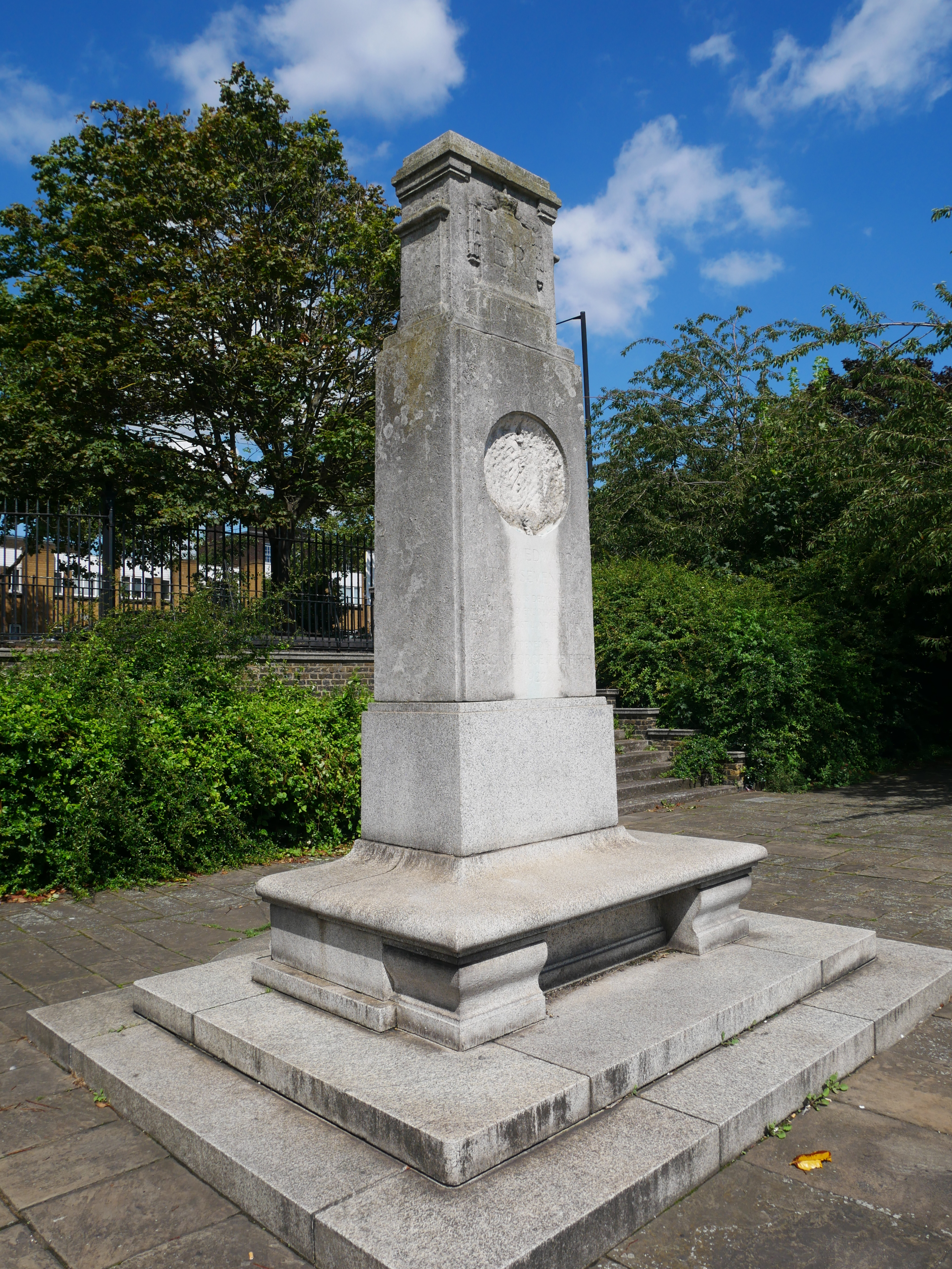
Monument at the north end of the park

The area had been built-up before being turned into a park, with one development being the Shadwell Fish Market, which opened in 1885. The market was not a commercial success and the land became used for informal football matches and a play area by local children. A report in The East London Observer on 23 December 1911, gives a report of a planning committee meeting about the setting up of the King Edward Memorial Park. Proposals and sketches of the plans appeared the next year by Stepney Borough Council.

King Edward Memorial Park was opened on 24 June 1922 by King George V and Queen Mary with the following dedication: "In grateful memory of King Edward VII. This park is dedicated to the use and enjoyment of the people of East London for ever." The Park proved to be a huge asset to the community from its very first day. In his first-hand account of the opening in 1922, George Jones writes:

"The 'New Park' proved to be an absolute bonus to the whole community and its planning was of the highest order, using the contours of levels and slopes down from The Highway to that new excellent promenade by the riverside amply provided with many bench seats and popular with senior citizens. Seen from the upper levels the huge vista of the then very busy Thames was an ever-changing kaleidoscope of colour and activity, of wharves and cranes and ships from all nations".

The park is famous for its unrestricted views of the river, for its amenities and its biodiversity value that has won it the Green Flag Award several times.

The park serves a number of local districts (Shadwell, Wapping, Stepney, Ratcliff and Limehouse), is the only riverside park between Tower Hill and the Isle of Dogs, and the only green space available in this portion of the Borough. Local schools use it for their sports days, religious festivals take place there making it a focal point for the local communities.

The importance of King Edward VII Memorial Park to local people is shown by the number of nearby residents with memorials there. The park benches on the riverfront are always adorned with flowers in remembrance of beloved family members and also many trees have been planted in honour of local people now passed.

== Proposed use for Thames Tunnel works ==
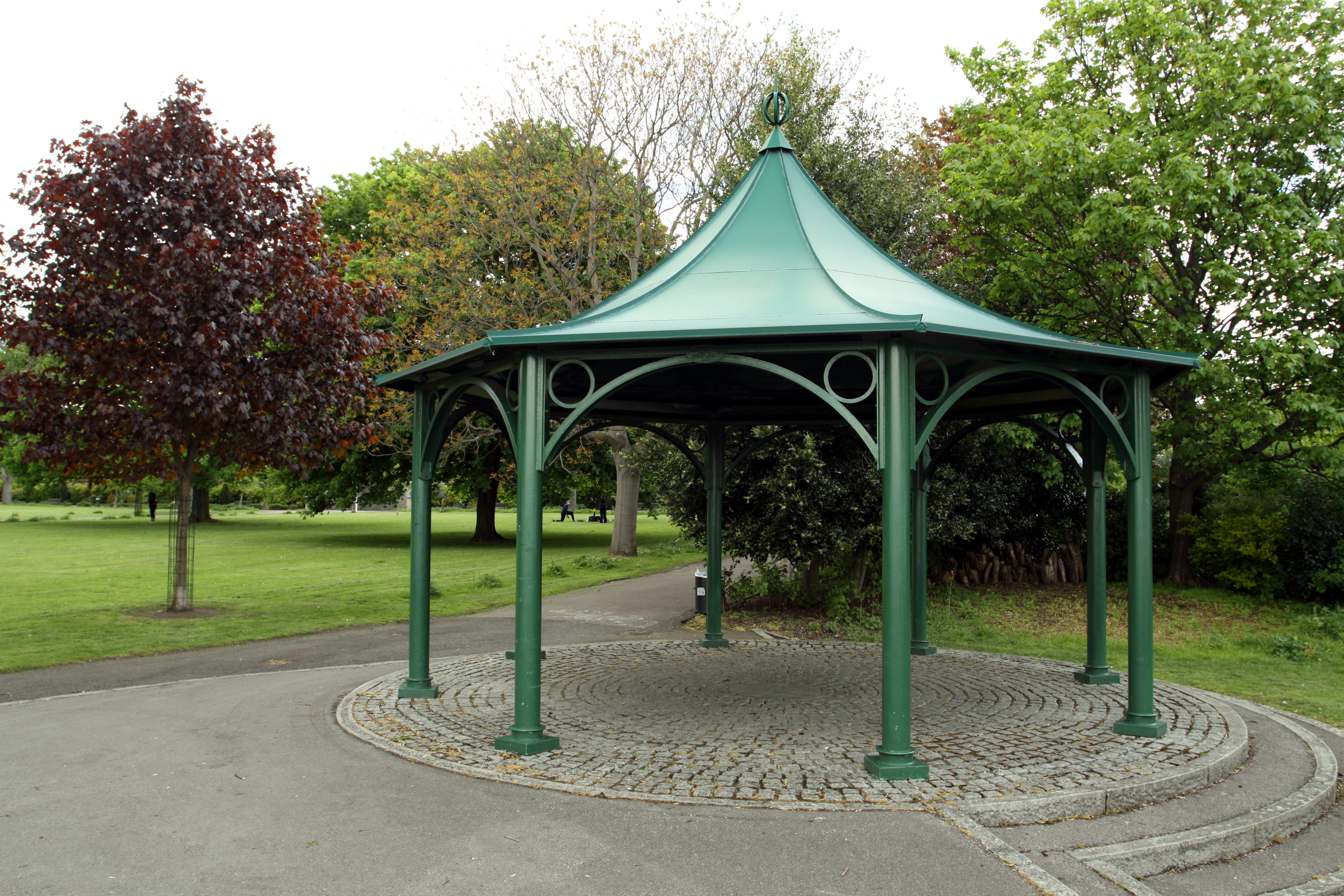
Pavilion in park

Thames Water has proposed to build a new sewer relief tunnel along the Thames, to avoid discharging sewage into the river as frequently as is currently necessary. The preferred route takes it past this park, and Thames Water proposed that part of the park should be used for construction of the tunnel, leaving a permanent access road through the park from The Highway and a ventilation shaft built on an extension to the foreshore.

=== December 2010 ===
Tower Hamlets Council announced official support for an option which would at least leave most of the park accessible during construction, and reinstate it at the end.

However, after looking at Thames Water's plans in more detail, it has emerged that the preferred option could make the park unusable for several years. The community has come together and created an action group that opposes the plans for the park and asks Thames Water to build on a brownfield site instead. In response to the campaign, many councillors and Cabinet Members have spoken against this project and Mayor Lutfur Rahman himself is a supporter of the SaveKEMP campaign.

=== February 2011 ===
On 2 February 2011 a motion to oppose Thames Water's plans and protect King Edward VII Memorial Park and its foreshore was passed with unanimous vote by the full Chamber of LBTH effectively overturning the position taken in December. The plan is also being officially opposed by Jim Fitzpatrick, Labour MP for Poplar and Limehouse who said, "I have been impressed by the energy and vigour of local people, for whom King Edward VII Memorial Park is an important part of their lives. The current proposal will turn one of London's vital green lungs into an industrial site and leave a permanent scar on the banks of the river. Thames Water needs to listen, to do its homework more thoroughly, and to come back with alternatives. Yes to reducing water pollution; yes to keeping King Edward VII Memorial Park green." John Biggs, Labour politician and elected member of the London Assembly for City and East London has spoken strongly against Thames Water's plans:

"I support the call by residents of Limehouse, Shadwell, Stepney and Wapping for Thames Water to review its preferred options for the Super Sewer and to focus specifically on brownfield sites for this development. I speak as someone who both endorses the Super Sewer and who knows the Park very well. It is clear to me that the current plans to build on the foreshore of the Park will damage an important local amenity which is more widely used than Thames Water has appreciated. Additionally, the park has an important role as a part of our heritage in the East End, and it needs to be treated with sensitivity. Despite the limitations of the current consultation, local people have seized the initiative to make their voices heard. Thames Water has said that it will use information gathered during the current consultation "to address any concerns which may arise". Local concerns are very clear. Thames Water should look again at options for brownfield development, beyond the options currently identified, so that reducing water pollution does not mean that a vital green space is irreparably damaged and for several years turned into a major construction site."

A large number of residents raised an online petition against the plan and have organised a protest group, as the riverside path would be closed to the public for up to seven years and the community would lose the only riverside park between Tower Hill and the Isle of Dogs.

=== November 2011 ===
Thames Water issued a modified proposal. The route of the access road has been changed to run next to the Thames Path from Glamis Road. This would reduce the impact on the park during construction, and also mean that, on completion, the access road would merge with Thames Path, slightly extending the park and making a wider section of the Thames Path.

=== September 2014 ===
Thames Water finally received permission to use the park for sewer works, but agreed a £4 million programme of improvements, a full refurbishment to be completed after the sewer construction. The improvements will include new sports and play facilities, a community building and extending the park onto the foreshore. Moreover, construction works will not normally take place on Saturdays, to reduce the impact on weekend use of the park.

=== July 2026 ===
Construction work on surface-level works relating to the Thames Tideway Tunnel project is ongoing. The planned July 2026 opening of a section of the Thames Path in the park was delayed following a theft of tools and parts.

== Transport links ==
The nearest stations are Wapping or Shadwell on the London Overground, and Shadwell on the Docklands Light Railway. Buses D3 and 100 also serve the park.
