= England Squadron =

Bomber squadron of the German airforce

- Englandgeschwader
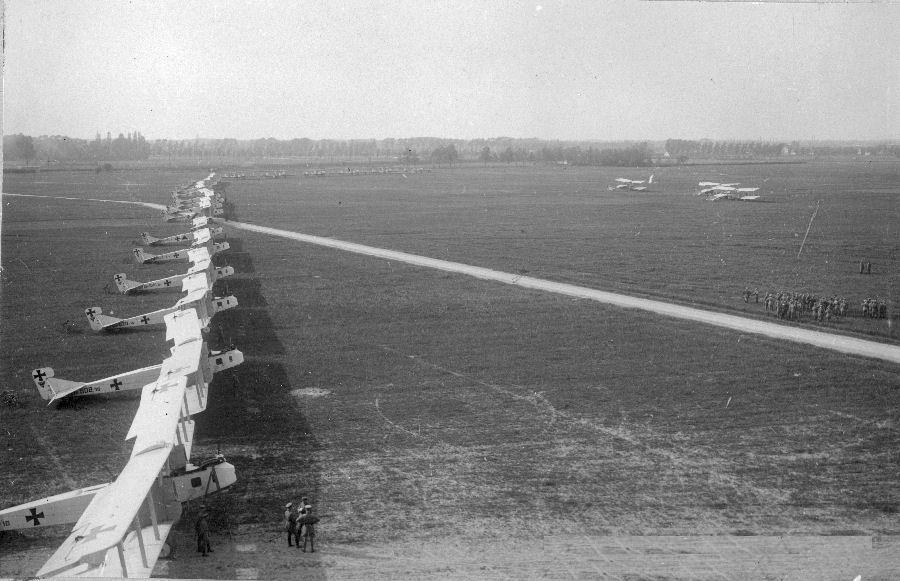
- The England Squadron lined up for inspection in 1917
- Country: German Empire
- Branch: Luftstreitkräfte

The England Squadron (German language: Englandgeschwader), officially Kagohl 3 or later Bogohl 3, was a squadron of the Imperial German Army Air Service, formed in late 1916 during the First World War for the purpose of the strategic bombing of the United Kingdom and specifically London. The first air raid of the squadron on 25 May 1917 was unable to reach London, but bombed the coastal town of Folkestone instead. On 13 June, the squadron bombed London in daylight causing nearly 600 casualties. A further raid in July prompted reinforcement and reorganisation of the capital's air defences, but German losses had also caused a switch to bombing by night.

On the night of 3/4 September, the squadron raided coastal towns in Kent and on the following night, London was attacked. Raids continued into the spring of 1918, supported by another squadron operating larger aircraft. The final attack was at the end of May, by which time more than 2,800 people had been killed or injured, 68% of those in the London area. A later plan for the squadron to join a massed attack on London and Paris with incendiary bombs in the autumn of 1918 was abandoned on the grounds that it might prejudice peace negotiations, and possibly the fear of reprisals against German cities.

== Background ==
A the outbreak of war in August 1914, the capability for a German strategic bombing campaign had initially rested with the eleven Zeppelin and Schütte-Lanz rigid airships which were operational with the Imperial German Air Service and the Imperial German Navy. However, the initial focus was on battlefield reconnaissance, tactical bombing and maritime patrol work. In the first weeks of the war, it seemed likely that the German offensive through Belgium would succeed in reaching the Pas de Calais area on the coast of the English Channel, which would put the South East of England within the range of the primitive bomber aircraft which were available at that time.

== Carrier Pigeon Squadron ==
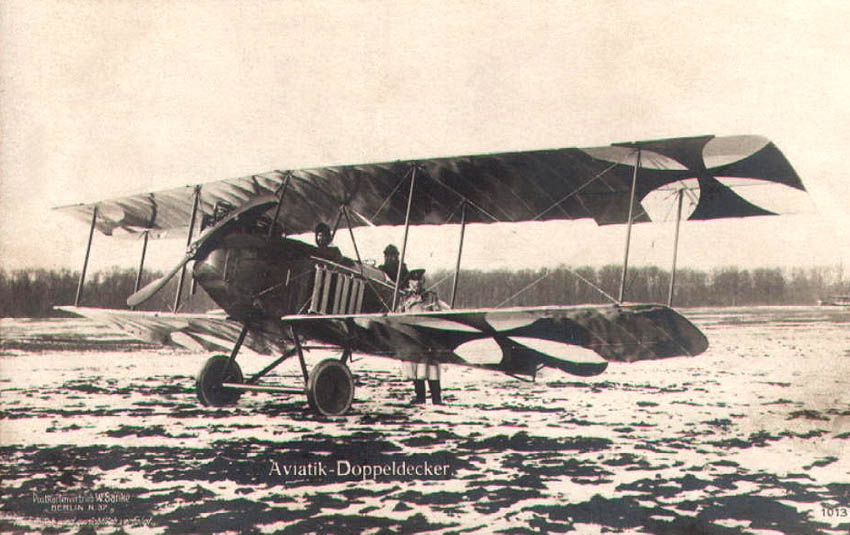
An Aviatik B.I, typical of the primitive two-seaters used by the Carrier Pigeon Squadron in late 1914.

Major Wilhelm Siegert was an aviation pioneer and an influential advocate of strategic bombing, who immediately approached the Oberste Heeresleitung (Supreme Army Command or OHL) proposing the formation of a bombing aeroplane force to attack Britain from Calais; the idea was accepted and on 19 October 1914, General Erich von Falkenhayn ordered Siegert to form an elite force for the purpose, the Fliergercorps der OHL. The new formation was selected from the best volunteers from the various branches of the Air Service and was installed at a temporary base amongst orchards at Ghistelles (Gistel) in occupied Belgium. To conceal its function, the unit was given the cover name of Breiftauben Abteilung or "Carrier Pigeon Squadron". The personnel were accommodated in a train so that they could deploy forwards at the earliest opportunity. The squadron was provided with thirty-six two-seat aircraft of various types. All of the aircraft were capable of carrying four 10 kilograms (22 lb) bombs, but not heavy defensive machine guns, so the aircrews relied on pistols or some prototype self-loading rifles which Siegert obtained from the museum of a weapons testing site. The squadron personnel were accommodated in railway carriages so that they could be quickly moved forward once the Channel coast had been captured. Amongst the talented pilots recruited to the squadron were Hermann Göring and Manfred von Richthofen.

With the failure of the German armies to make any progress in the First Battle of Ypres, it became clear that the Pas de Calais would not be captured in the near future and the focus of the Carrier Pigeon Squadron was broadened; on 28 January 1915, an attack was mounted on the port of Dunkirk, which was the main supply port for the British Expeditionary Force (BEF). Further raids followed on Furnes, La Panne and Nieuport, before the squadron was broken up; part was moved to Metz while the remainder was later redeployed to the Eastern Front. Returning to Ghistelles in December 1915, the squadron was designated Kampfgeschwader 1 der OHL ("Battle Group 1 of the Army High Command"), usually abbreviated to Kaghol 1, where it was engaged in airship escort, patrol work, tactical bombing over the Verdun and Somme battlefields. In August 1916, Kaghol 1 was split into two half-squadrons or halbgeschwader; Halbgeschwader 1 remained on the Western Front while Halbgeschwader 2 was redeployed to the Balkans theatre.

== Operation Turk's Cross ==
During the autumn of 1916, increasing losses to the German airship fleet while bombing London and other towns in England culminated in the disastrous raid of 27/28 November when two naval Zeppelins were shot down by defending fighters. Although the navy was determined to press on with improved airship designs, the recently reorganised army service had already decided that the campaign had "become impossible". The army air service had been given greater operational autonomy, was retitled Luftstreitkräfte (Air Force) and given a general officer to command it, General Ernst von Hoeppner. Siegert, who was contemptuous of Hoeppner's total lack of flying experience, was made Inspector General of the new force.

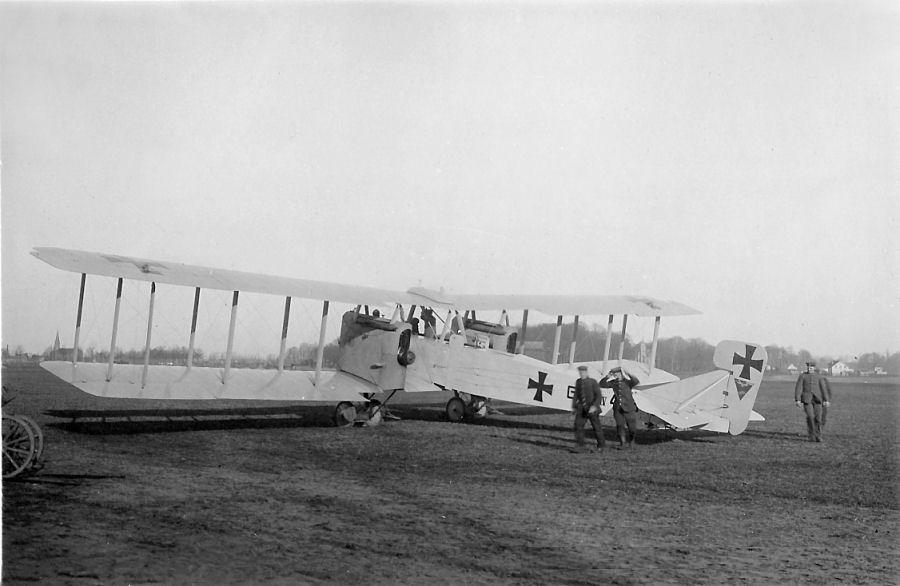
One of the England Squadron's first Gotha G.IV bombers in December 1916.

One of Hoeppner's first directives was to repurpose Halbgeschwader 1 to operate the new Gotha G.IV heavy bombers specifically to bomb London, a mission which Hoeppner called "Scheme 1" but the OHL designated Operation Turkenkreuz or Turk's Cross. (Note: Turkenkrauz refers to a type of wayside cross found in Austria and southern Germany commemorating a victory over the Ottomans in 1594.) Hoeppner and the OHL hoped for several results from the operation; besides degrading British morale, it was believed that by bombing in daylight, specific military, political and communications targets could be effectively targeted. A subsidiary effect would be the redeployment of British anti-aircraft guns and fighter aircraft from the Western Front to home defence duties. The half-squadron was expanded from three to six kasta or flights and was renamed Kampfgeschwader 3 der OHL, abbreviated to Kaghol 3, but was better known as Englandgeschwader or England Squadron. Experience with small numbers of the earlier Gotha G.II and G.III bombers had shown that an exceptionally level airfield was required to avoid damaging the delicate aircraft, and accordingly four new airfields would be built in the area around Ghent. While waiting for these to be finished and pending the arrival of their new aircraft, the squadron used their two-seaters for night raids on the ports of Calais and Dunkirk, and the logistic hub of Saint-Pol-sur-Ternoise. Detachments of aircrew were also sent in rotation for training at the naval air bases at Westerland and Heligoland, where they learned navigation at sea and warship recognition.

It had originally been planned that the England Squadron would be fully equipped with 30 new G.IV bombers by 1 February 1917, but shortages of strategic materials caused by the British blockade and problems with the Mercedes D.IVa engines resulted in lengthy production delays. Hoeppner had selected Hauptmann Ernst Brandenburg to command the England Squadron and he took up the appointment at Ghistelles on 5 March. A former infantry officer, he transferred to the air service as an air observer after being wounded in 1915 and had subsequently proved to have a flair for organisation. On arrival, Brandenburg intensified training to include more navigation over water and night flying.

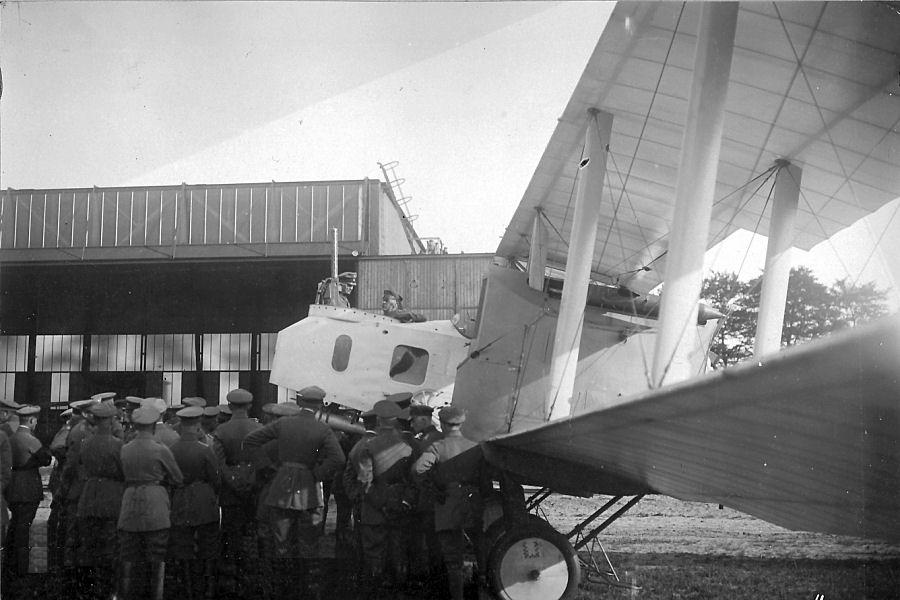
General Ludendorff and his staff inspect a Gotha G.IV of the England Squadron on 24 May 1917.

The first G.IV aircraft arrived in March 1917, but teething problems requiring the complete replacement of their engines meant that they could not be flown fully-laden until early May, with the full complement finally arriving at the end of that month. Brandenburg ordered that each aircraft should be test-flown for twenty-five hours before being considered operational. Even so, there were numerous difficulties with landing, since the bombers became dangerously unstable without the ballast of fuel and bombs and it was difficult to avoid breaking the frail undercarriage. In April, the squadron dispersed to the new airfields at Sint-Denijs-Westrem, Gontrode (near Melle) and in the following month, Mariakerke and Oostakker. The officers were quartered centrally in a chateau at Borluut near Sint-Denijs, while Brandenburg set up his headquarters at Gontrode. On 24 May, the squadron was inspected at Sint-Denijs by General Ludendorff and declared operational.

=== Folkestone raid ===
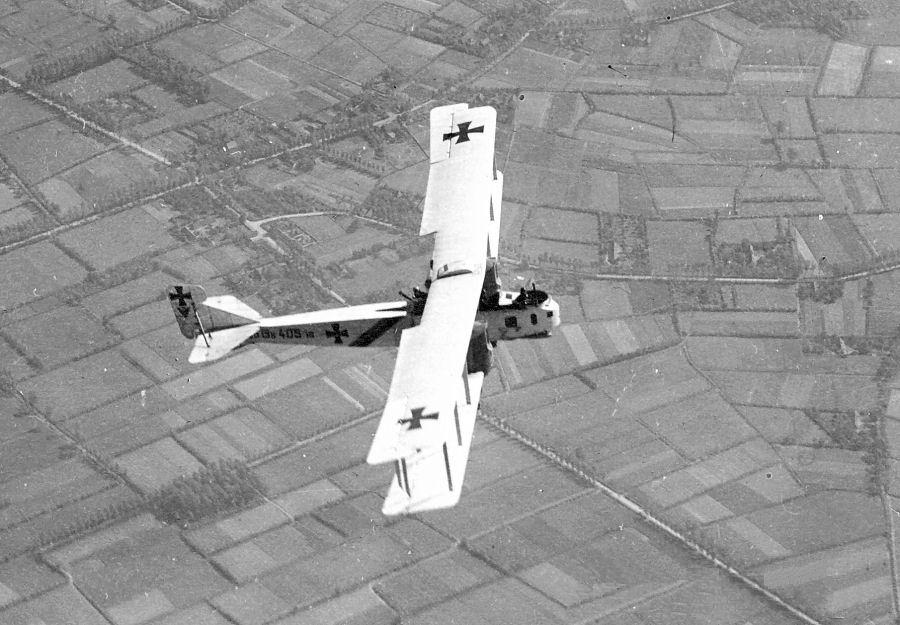
A Gotha G.IV over Belgium in June 1917 in the very pale blue paint scheme used during the daylight raids.

Having received a favourable weather forecast for the following day, 25 May, Brandenburg issued orders for the first Gotha attack on London. Twenty-three bombers took off at 2 pm and refuelled at Nieuwmunster near Zuienkerke on the Belgian coast, so that they had enough fuel to approach by a circuitous route over the North Sea. One aircraft dropped out with engine failure almost immediately and another turned back near the English coast. On the approach to London it was found that there was a thick cloud cover over the whole area and so on the return route, the coastal town of Folkestone and the army camp at Shorncliffe were attacked. There was no warning given to those on the ground and casualties totalled 95 dead and 195 injured, including many women and children who had been queuing outside shops in Tontine Street. British opposition, equipped and organised to oppose nocturnal airship raids, had been largely ineffective; Sir John French, who was in overall command of home defence, had previously ordered that only coastal anti-aircraft guns could fire at hostile aircraft, and although 70 fighters had taken off, only two actually sighted the bombers. However, RNAS fighters from Dunkirk intercepted the returning formation and shot down one into the Channel, while another crashed on landing. Retaliatory British raids were made on the airfield at Saint-Denijs on 28 May and 4 June but caused little damage. On 5 June, a second raid on London was rerouted before takeoff to Sheerness Dockyard because of a bad weather forecast; one Gotha was shot down into the Thames Estuary by anti-aircraft fire. Several small vessels were sunk in the docks and an ammunition store exploded; 13 were killed and 34 wounded, mostly military personnel.

=== Daylight London raids ===
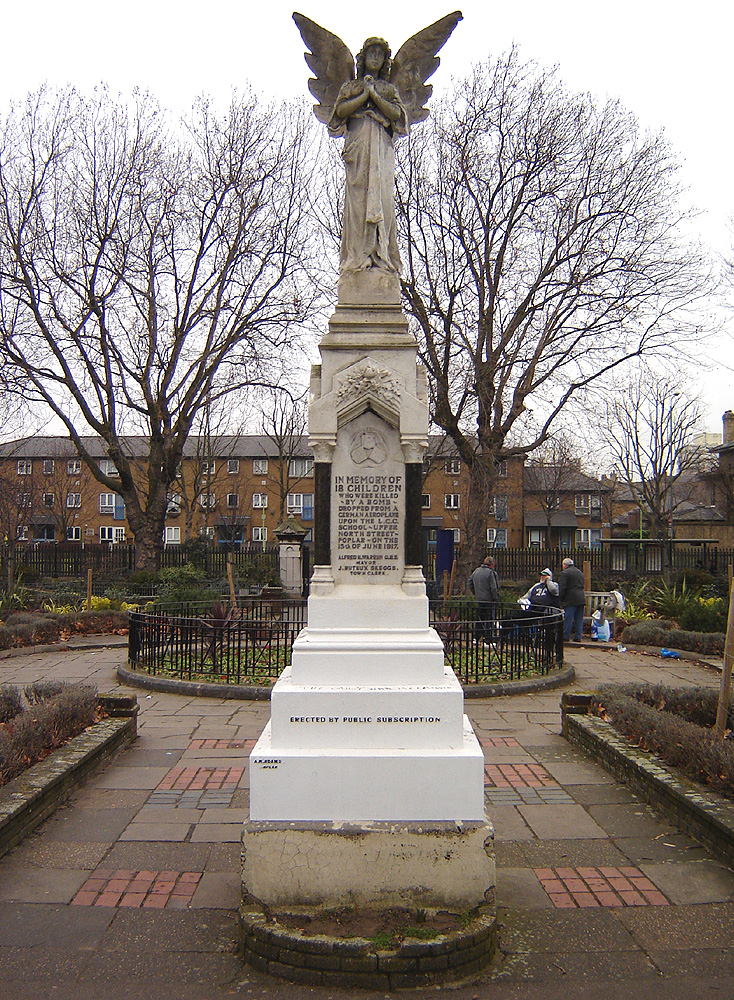
The Poplar Recreation Ground Memorial to the child victims of the bombing of Upper North Street School.

There were considerable difficulties in forecasting the weather over London, since the prevailing winds came from the west where the Germans had no sources of information. However, on 12 June 1916, the England Squadron's meteorologist was able to give a confident forecast of clear weather over the capital. On the morning of 13 June, twenty aircraft took off, but two quickly fell out with engine problems. All of the aircraft had been fitted with a reserve fuel tank to avoid a refuelling stop. Diversions were carried out with the aim of drawing defending fighters away from the main formation; one aircraft turned south to bomb Margate in Kent, while two left to bomb Sheerness and another overflew Greenwich on a photo reconnaissance mission. The remaining fourteen aircraft flew on in two lines abreast. The first three fighter squadrons were ordered to take off shortly before 11 am and the first of the London area anti-aircraft guns at Romford opened fire at 11:24. The squadron flew on unaffected, dropping a small number of bombs over East London before overflying the central districts, turning over Regents Park at 11:35 and then returning to attack the City of London.

A total of 72 bombs fell within a 1 mile (1.6 km) radius of Liverpool Street Station. Amongst the casualties were sixteen people killed in the station itself where a passenger train and a military hospital train were hit; elsewhere, nineteen were killed at an office in Fenchurch Street and eight at a brass foundry in Finsbury. As the squadron began its return flight, any remaining bombs were dropped on the East End, one bomb landing on the Upper North Street School in Poplar, resulting in the deaths of eighteen children, most of them under six years-old. Despite 94 sorties being flown by British fighters and being engaged by eleven of the London guns, all of the England Squadron's bombers returned without serious damage. The raid resulted in 162 deaths and 426 injuries, the highest casualty total of any raid on Britain in the war, as well as property losses of £126,000, equivalent to £9,736,000 in 2023.

The raid caused public outcry in London, especially over the poor showing of the London defences. The result was the allocation of some more modern aircraft to the home defence squadrons, but there were no more anti-aircraft guns available in the short term. Two squadrons of modern fighters were withdrawn from the Western Front on the condition that they return by 5 July. In Germany, the raid was considered a triumph and Brandenburg was summoned to Berlin on the following day to receive the Pour le Mérite or "Blue Max", the highest order of merit in the empire. While returning to the squadron on 19 June, his two-seat Albatros aircraft crashed; although he survived the accident, his leg had to be amputated. He was replaced by Hauptmann Rudolphe Kleine, an ambitious officer with a reputation for incaution.

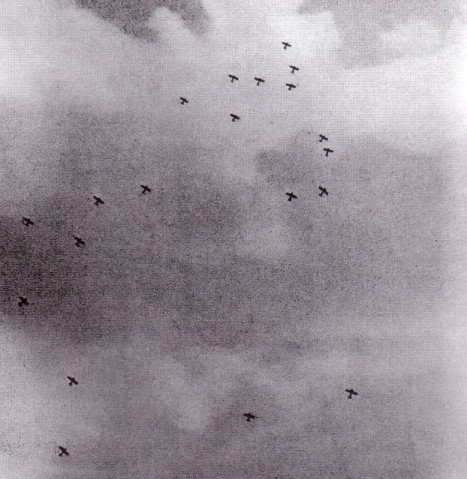
Formation of 22 Gotha G.IV bombers of the England Squadron over London on 7 July 1917.

A second raid was mounted on 7 July with 22 Gothas, one of which turned back on reaching the English coast but bombed Margate on its return flight. Opposing fighters were ineffective when they were able to make contact, with many pilots reporting jammed guns. The Gothas approached London in formation from the north, using Epping Forest as a landmark, sometimes breaking up into smaller groups to avoid the heavy anti-aircraft barrage before reforming again. Although a small number of bombs were dropped on the northern suburbs, the main focus was again the City of London, with one bomb destroying the Central Telegraph Office near St Paul's Cathedral and others landing near London Bridge Station. The formation flew off to the east, returning via the Essex coast. A total of 79 RFC and 22 RNAS fighters were airborne during the raid, but the only direct success for the defenders was a single Gotha which was shot down in the North Sea by an Armstrong Whitworth FK8. Another Gotha crashed on the beach at Ostend following earlier damage and three others were wrecked while landing. Total casualties on the ground amounted to 54 killed and 190 wounded, 10 of the deaths and 55 injuries were attributed to falling anti-aircraft shells or splinters. This second raid led to anti-German demonstrations in London, during which anyone suspected of being German was assaulted and their property ransacked. Public feeling ran so high that King George V was obliged to renounce his German titles and change his family name, which included the name Gotha, to the House of Windsor. More importantly, an urgent review of air defences was conducted by General Smuts, resulting in the establishment of the London Air Defence Area (LADA) to unify command and control, guns and fighters were reorganised into separate zones and an air raid warning system was adopted to try to minimise civilian casualties. A further raid on 22 July was directed at Harwich because of cloud further inland; 13 were killed and 22 injured.

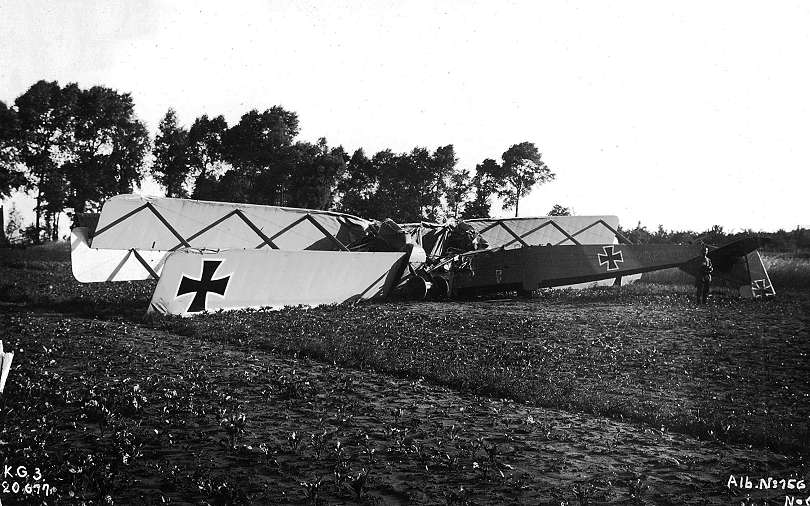
A crashed Gotha near Gontrode airfield on 20 July 1917; a majority of the England Squadron's losses were due to the Gotha's poor landing characteristics.

London was given a respite by poor summer weather. A raid on 12 August had such a strong headwind that the squadron only reached Southend-on-Sea before having to turn back; one Gotha was shot down, another crash-landed at Zeebrugge and four more were wrecked in landing accidents. Another attempt on 18 August never reached England at all, again because of adverse wind. On their return flight the squadron made landfall in the neutral Netherlands; a total of nine aircraft were lost to Dutch gunfire, ran out of fuel or crashed on landing. Only 15 Gothas were airworthy for the next raid on 22 August; five returned early with mechanical problems and the remainder only reached the English coastal towns. Two were shot down by RNAS fighters and one by anti-aircraft fire. This was the last daylight raid on England by the squadron; none of the August missions had reached London, for the loss of 18 bombers.

== Night raids ==
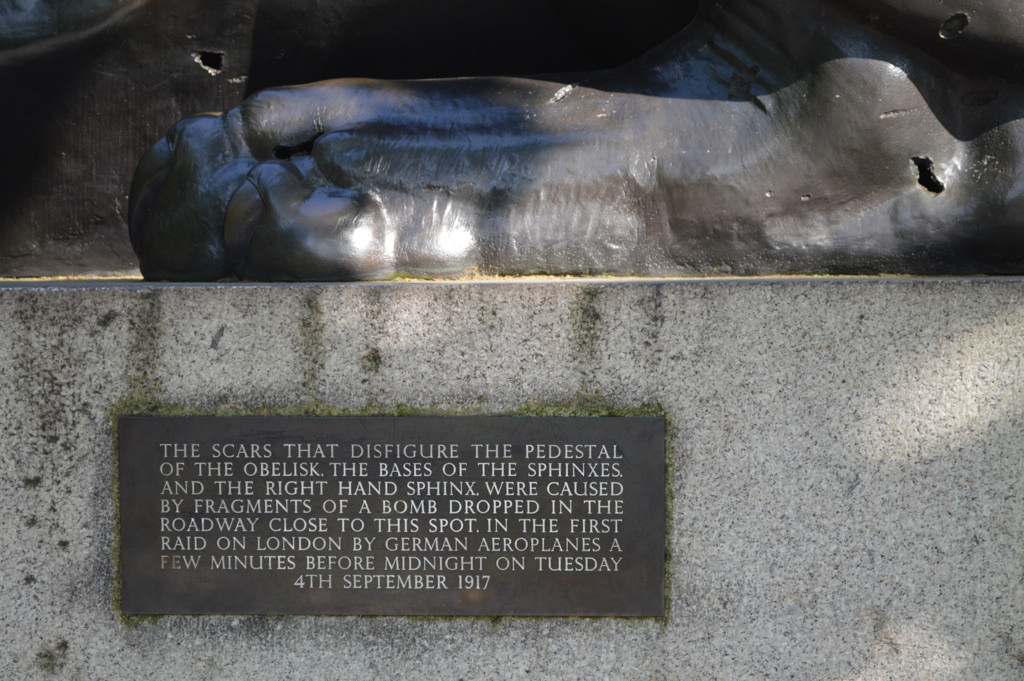
A plaque on one of the sphinxes flanking Cleopatra's Needle, commemorating the damage caused to the monument during the first night raid by aeroplanes.

The unsustainable losses of the August raids prompted Kleine's decision to switch to night bombing. A period of intense night flying training coincided with the delivery of the Gotha G.V to the squadron; however, hopes that the new aircraft would be able to fly higher and faster than their predecessor were unfounded, as they proved to be not much of an improvement. On the night of 3/4 September 1917, four Gothas raided Margate, Sheerness and Chatham Dockyard, where a bomb fell on a drill hall full of sleeping naval recruits; 138 died and 88 were injured. The success of this sortie resulted in a raid on London by 11 Gothas on the following night, when fine weather combined with good moonlight provided optimal conditions. The aircraft flew singly, taking off at five-minute intervals. On the inbound flight, one Gotha was caught by a searchlight and shot down into the River Medway by a gun at Fort Borstal, but the others were unmolested by fighters which were unable to locate the bombers. Most of the serious damage was confined to the West End, but bombs were scattered across the capital from Wanstead in the north east to Hampstead in the north west. One 50 kg bomb landed on the Victoria Embankment next to Cleopatra's Needle, destroying a passing tram.

=== Harvest moon offensive ===
By 24 September 1917, the weather had improved and the moon was moving into the phase known as the "harvest moon", which would later give its British name to this series of raids. Of the 16 Gothas which took off, three aircraft turned back with engine problems, while only three bombers actually reached London; the others, perhaps deterred by the recently improved anti-aircraft barrage, chose to bomb coastal towns in Essex and Kent. Of those that reached the capital, one approached from the south and bombed the London Docks, while the other two approached from the north and attacked Islington and the West End; a total of 14 were killed and 49 injured. One Gotha crashed in Belgium, perhaps damaged by ground fire. On the following night, again only three out of 15 Gothas reached London where they bombed the south eastern districts; one returning bomber was engaged by a Sopwith 1½ Strutter over Essex and another failed to return, whether it was the same aircraft is unknown. After a break caused by poor weather, another raid by 25 Gothas was launched on 28 December. Most of the aircraft turned back because of total cloud cover over England and none reached London; however a number of civilians were killed in crush incidents as crowds sought refuge in London Underground stations. Three Gothas failed to return, possibly victims of coastal guns, and poor visibility had spread to the continent by the time the remainder straggled back, resulting in one crash in the Netherlands and five in Belgium.

=== Arrival of the Giants ===
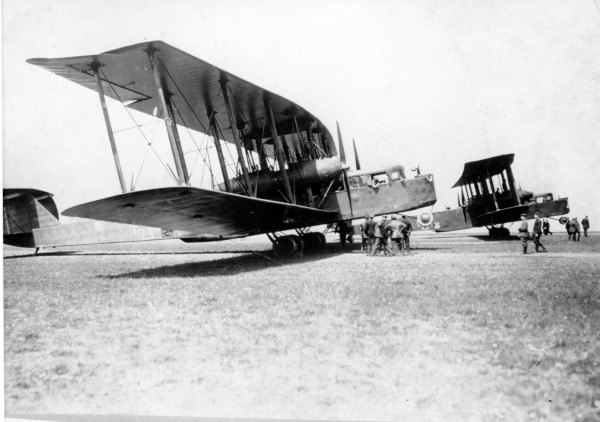
Zeppelin-Staaken R.VI giant bombers of Rfa 501.

Making their debut in the 28 September raid were two aircraft of Riesenflugzeug Abteilung 501 (abbreviated to "Rfa 501") which operated Riesenflugzeug or "giant aircraft", huge four-engined bombers with a crew of seven and a wingspan almost twice that of the Gotha. They were capable of carrying a much larger bomb load and could carry a single 1,000 kilograms (2,200 lb) weapon, but were extremely complex for the time, requiring a specially trained ground crew of 50 men for each aircraft. Rfa 501 had been transferred from the Eastern Front earlier in the month and operated from Sint-Denijs which they shared with two flights of the England Squadron. The two squadrons would largely cooperate during the following months.

On 29 September, the England Squadron had seven airworthy Gothas available for the next raid on London, while Rfa 501 could contribute three R.VI Giants. Cloud and a low mist made navigation difficult and only two Gothas and a single Giant reached the capital. Concentrations of bombs landed in Notting Hill to the southwest, Waterloo Station on the Southbank and Dalston in the northeast, where a pub called "The Eaglet" was hit, killing four. On 30 September, six of eleven attacking Gothas reached the London area, mostly in the east where two were killed. The last of the harvest moon raids was on 1 October when six of eighteen Gothas reached London, scattering bombs from Hoxton in the northeast to Pimlico in the west; total casualties that night were 11 killed and 41 injured.

=== Fire plan ===
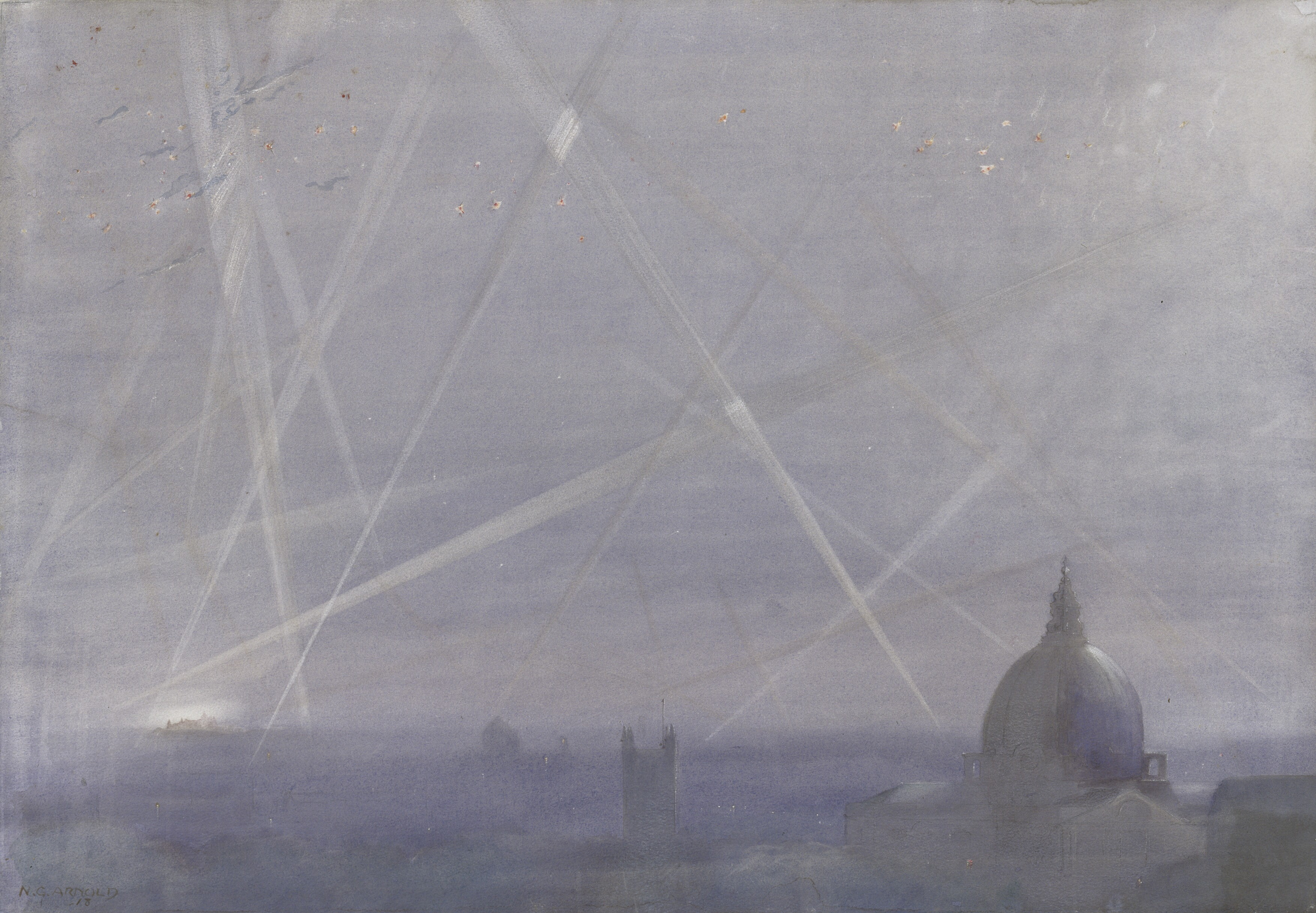
"An October Night Raid on London, 1917 - Seen from the Royal College of Science".

There was a pause in operations caused by bad weather, during which Klein was awarded the Pour le Mérite. When fine weather finally returned on 31 October, it coincided with the next full moon, the "hunter's moon". In view of the disappointing results in London so far, it was decided to resurrect a plan originally devised for the airship raids, by which large numbers of incendiary bombs would create numerous large fires in the capital, overwhelming the ability of the London Fire Brigade to extinguish them. An improved version of incendiary was employed, with each aircraft carrying a half-and-half mix of them with conventional high explosive (HE) bombs. 22 Gothas took off; all of them reached the English coast but strong crosswinds blew many of them off course causing them to abandon London as a target and instead bombed coastal towns on their return flight. Perhaps as few as five aircraft reached the metropolitan area and hit three main areas; Erith and Slade Green in the southeast, the Isle of Dogs, Greenwich and Charlton in the east and Tooting and Streatham in the south. Although a paint factory had been burned down, many of the incendiaries had either failed to ignite or had landed harmlessly in open spaces. Fog over the landing grounds in Belgium resulted in five Gothas being written-off in landing accidents.

A second attempt was made on 5 December with 19 Gothas and two Giants from Rfa 501. This time, a greater proportion of the bombs were incendiaries. Three Gothas turned back early and only six Gothas were able or willing to penetrate the London defences. Fires were started at Rose's lime juice factory near Liverpool Street Station, in clothing workshops at Whitechapel Road and a factory in Gray's Inn Road. Other incendiaries and bombs landed in a wide area south of the Thames from Balham to Stockwell. For the first time, the London guns successfully shot down one of the raiders, although it managed to reach Canterbury before crashing. A second bomber was hit by guns at Canvey Island and landed on the airfield at RFC Rochford; the crew surrendered their Gotha, the first that had been captured intact by the Allies, but an RFC officer took a flare pistol as a souvenir and accidentally discharged it into the fuselage, destroying much valuable intelligence. One other Gotha failed to return and was presumed to have been lost at sea, while two more crashed in Belgium and yet another was wrecked on landing, a total of six lost aircraft. Total damage from the 260 incendiary and 13 HE bombs that landed on the capital amounted to £92,000; two civilians were killed and another by a falling anti-aircraft shell. It was recognised that the emphasis on incendiaries was not having the intended effect, and later raids would use a greater proportion of high explosive bombs. On 12 December, the England Squadron was tasked with the tactical bombing of British camps at Ypres, during which Klein was shot down and killed by fighters from No. 1 Squadron RFC. Temporary command passed to Oberleutnant Richard Walter, the senior flight commander.

=== Winter raids ===
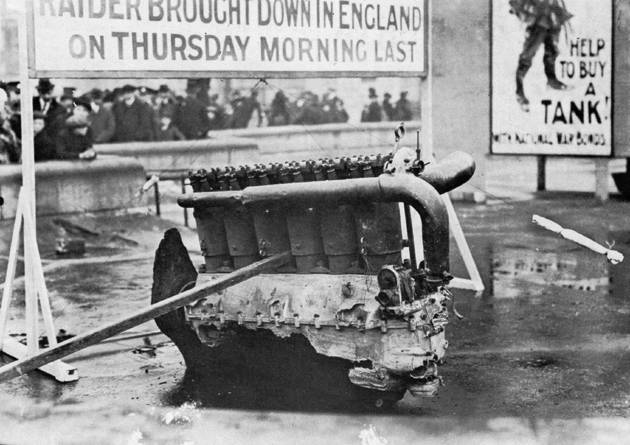
The engine of a Gotha V, shot down on 18 December 1917, put on public display at Trafalgar Square.

In mid-December 1917, the England Squadron had its official designation changed from Kaghol 3 to Bombengeschwader 3 der OHL, usually abbreviated to "Boghol 3". The squadron's next sortie against London was on 18 December, when 15 Gothas and a single Giant set out on an almost moonless night which had lulled the defenders into a false sense of security. Six Gothas and one Giant penetrated the London barrage and bombed the centre of the capital. Amongst several places hit were a piano factory in Farringdon Street and a Salvation Army hostel in Bermondsey. A total of 13 deaths and 79 injuries were recorded, for one Gotha shot down by No. 44 Squadron and another two which crashed on landing. Damage was estimated at £225,000, making it the most financially damaging raid by the squadron of the war.

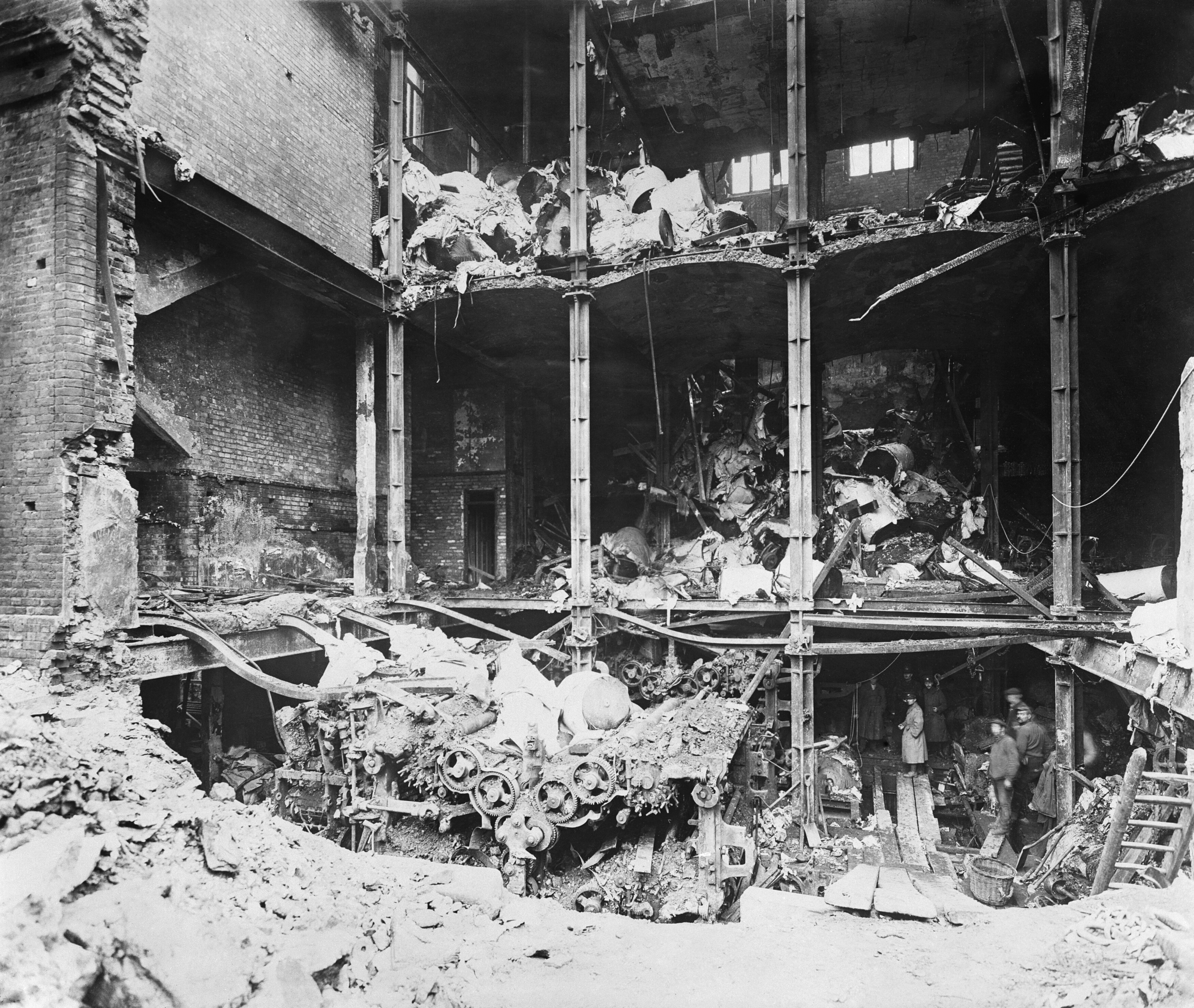
Odhams Printing Works in Long Acre, which was bombed on 28 January 1918; 38 people were killed and 85 injured in an air-raid shelter in the basement.

The start of 1918 was a cold one and London was concealed in fog for the first few weeks. On 28 January, the forecast looked promising, but fog closed-in as the squadron was taking off, resulting in seven Gothas successfully crossing the Channel, while only three reached London. Their arrival caused an accident at Bishopsgate Goods Yard as people rushed for shelter under the arches there; 14 were killed in the crush. Bombs fell over a wide area from Poplar in the east to Maida Vale in the west. The single Giant which had accompanied the raid later bombed a print works in Long Acre, the basement of which was being used as a public shelter; 38 were killed when the floors above collapsed, it took six weeks to recover all the bodies. The total casualties for the raid were 65 killed and 159 injured. One Gotha was shot down, again by 44 Squadron, and crashed near Wickford in Essex; another four were lost in landing accidents.

In February, Ernst Brandenburg returned to command the England Squadron again. walking with difficulty on a prosthetic leg. Raids on England were suspended until replacement aircraft and aircrew could be supplied, and in March, the squadron was tasked with supporting the German spring offensive. In the meantime, the Giants of Rfa 501 conducted a series of unsupported raids on London, which included the use of the devastating 1,000 kilograms (2,200 lb) bomb. The England Squadron had planned to join a massed raid on 9 May; Brandenburg ordered his Gothas to cancel due to a forecast of fog, but the Giants persisted and three out of four of them were lost.

=== Whitsun Raid ===
After a return to missions over the Western Front, Brandenburg finally received a good weather forecast for London on 19 May, which coincided with the Whitsun Bank Holiday weekend in England. Mustering a total of 38 Gothas, aided by three Giants, this was to be the largest air raid of the war. The clear skies and recently reorganised defences meant that 88 fighter sorties were launched and 30,000 anti-aircraft shells were fired against the raiders. Only 18 bombers reached the capital and 72 bombs were recorded over a wide area from Bexleyheath in the southeast to Regent's Park in the northwest; 48 were killed and 172 injured. Two Gothas were shot down by fighters, one crashing on the Isle of Sheppey and another at East Ham, another two were brought down by coastal guns and a fifth crashed in Belgium. It was the last air raid on England in the war, as further raids planned for July were cancelled in favour of supporting the faltering German Army.

== Elektron Plan ==
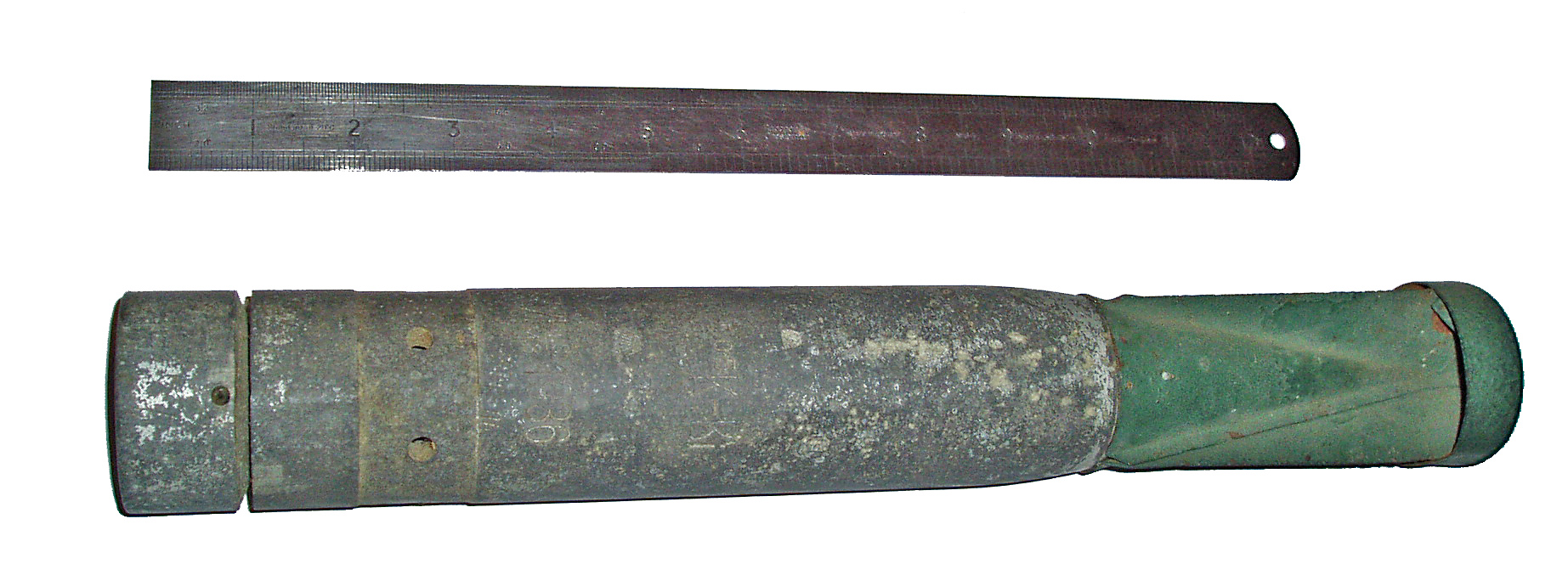
A later version of the B1 Elektronbrandbombe with a 30 cm rule for scale.

Meanwhile, German scientists had developed the B-1E Elektronbrandbombe, a small incendiary bomblet, only 35 centimetres (14 in) long and weighing 1 kilogram (2.2 lb), in which a priming charge of powdered magnesium ignited the main charge of thermite and the Elektron (magnesium alloy) body, resulting in an intense blaze of up to 3,000 °C. The plan was for the England Squadron (Boghol 3) together with Rfa 501 to attack London with thousands of these weapons, while Boghols 1, 2 and 4 simultaneously attacked Paris. The surviving aircraft were to return to refuel and rearm, continuing the attack until they were either destroyed or the crews were too exhausted to fly. The hope was that the inextinguishable firestorms created would cause mass panic and force the Allies to sue for peace. By August 1918, tens of thousands of Elektron bombs had been stockpiled close to the bomber bases, however the weather in September was the wettest on record and there were numerous postponements.

On 23 September, the England Squadron prepared to implement the plan on that evening, but an order from OHL cancelling the operation arrived only half an hour before takeoff. One of the Paris squadrons was already taxiing onto the runway and had to be stopped by a staff officer who drove his car in front of the aircraft. Erich Ludendorff, the chief policy-maker of the OHL, later wrote that the raids might have made the Allies less likely to agree to an armistice; however, the Chancellor of Germany, Georg von Hertling, had also lobbied the OHL against the incendiary plan because of the threat of reprisal bombing of German cities by the Independent Air Force. In any event, the Elektron bombs were withdrawn to depots and eventually dumped in the River Scheldt.

== Withdrawal and disbandment ==
In the weeks following the abandonment of the Elektron plan, the England Squadron were forced to move four times when their airfields were threatened by the advancing Allies. Although it had been intended to mount further conventional raids on London, the opportunity never arose, as the squadron was heavily engaged in reconnaissance and ground attack missions in support of the retreating German Army. The squadron was at Evere near Brussels when the Armistice of 11 November came into effect. According to the terms of the agreement, the aircraft should have been given to the Allies intact; however, some were burned or shot to pieces, while others that were apparently airworthy were sabotaged to make them dangerous to fly. The personnel of the squadron then travelled by lorry to Frankfurt where they were demobilised at the end of the month.

== Results and legacy ==
Between 25 May 1917 and 19 May 1918, the Gothas of the England Squadron, together with the Giants of Rfa 501, dropped 105,000 kg of high explosives and 6,500 kg of incendiaries on England. The raids killed 837 people and injured 1,991, of which 486 deaths and 1,432 injuries were in the London area, representing 68% of the total. Material damage that they inflicted was estimated at £1.4 million, £1.2 million of that being in London. Although German hopes of being able to hit specific war-related targets were not realised, there were often severe falls in munitions production around the time of major raids. Although the Germans also failed in their other aim of destroying the morale of Londoners to the extent that they pressured their government into suing for peace, the lack of preparation of civilians did engender mass panic at times and during the sustained "Harvest Moon raids" of October 1917, the capital was, by some accounts, close to collapse. However, rather than pleading for peace, the public reaction was to vociferously demand retaliation.

One major effect of the bombing campaign was that it forced the British to dissipate forces that could have been used elsewhere in the war. By 1918, the defences against air attack in Southern England amounted to 469 anti-aircraft guns and 622 searchlights along with numerous other pieces of equipment. A total of 376 aircraft were dedicated to home defence, operated by more than 4,000 airmen. On two occasions, front-line fighter squadrons had to be withdrawn from the Western Front, where they were desperately needed.

On the other side of the balance sheet, the German aeroplane raids forced a major reorganisation of the British home defences. Poor cooperation between the RFC and the RNAS resulted in the formation of the Royal Air Force, the world's first fully independent air force, under the direction of a separate Air Ministry. The integration of all arms in the London Air Defence Area was also ground-breaking and was the direct predecessor of the Dowding system which was so pivotal in the Battle of Britain in 1940. Furthermore, the experience of air raids in the First World War was the foundation of the government's efforts twenty years later to prepare the civilian population and engender the kind of civic stoicism which would become known as the "Blitz Spirit".
