= Poplar Recreation Ground Memorial =

War memorial in London

Coordinates: 51.5107°N 0.0168°W

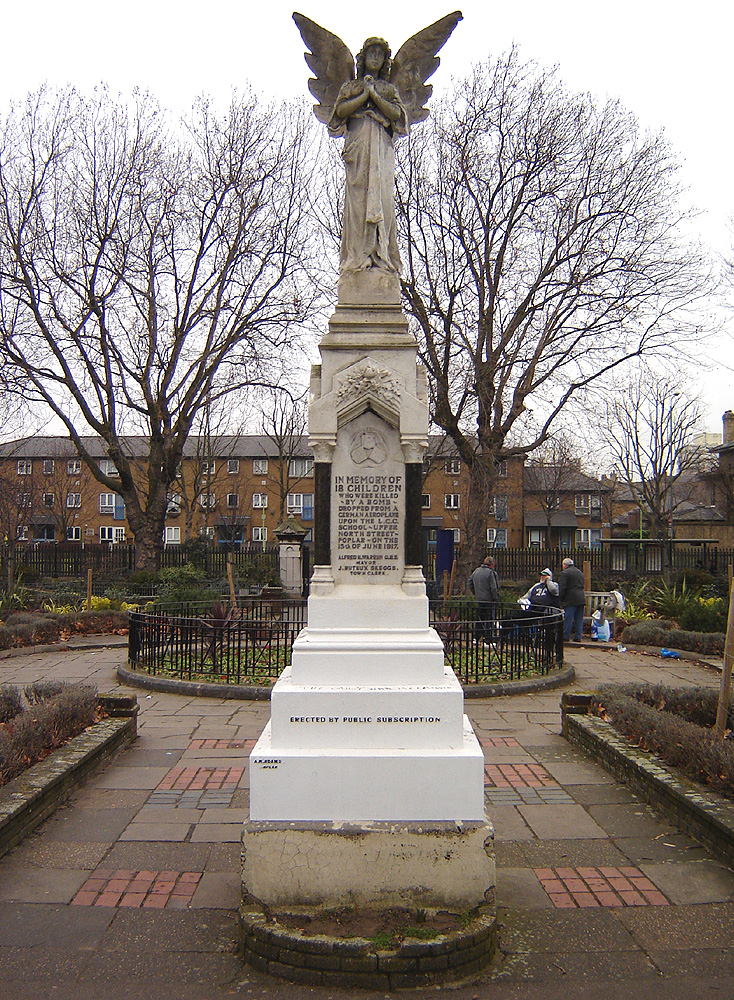
The memorial in Poplar Recreation Ground

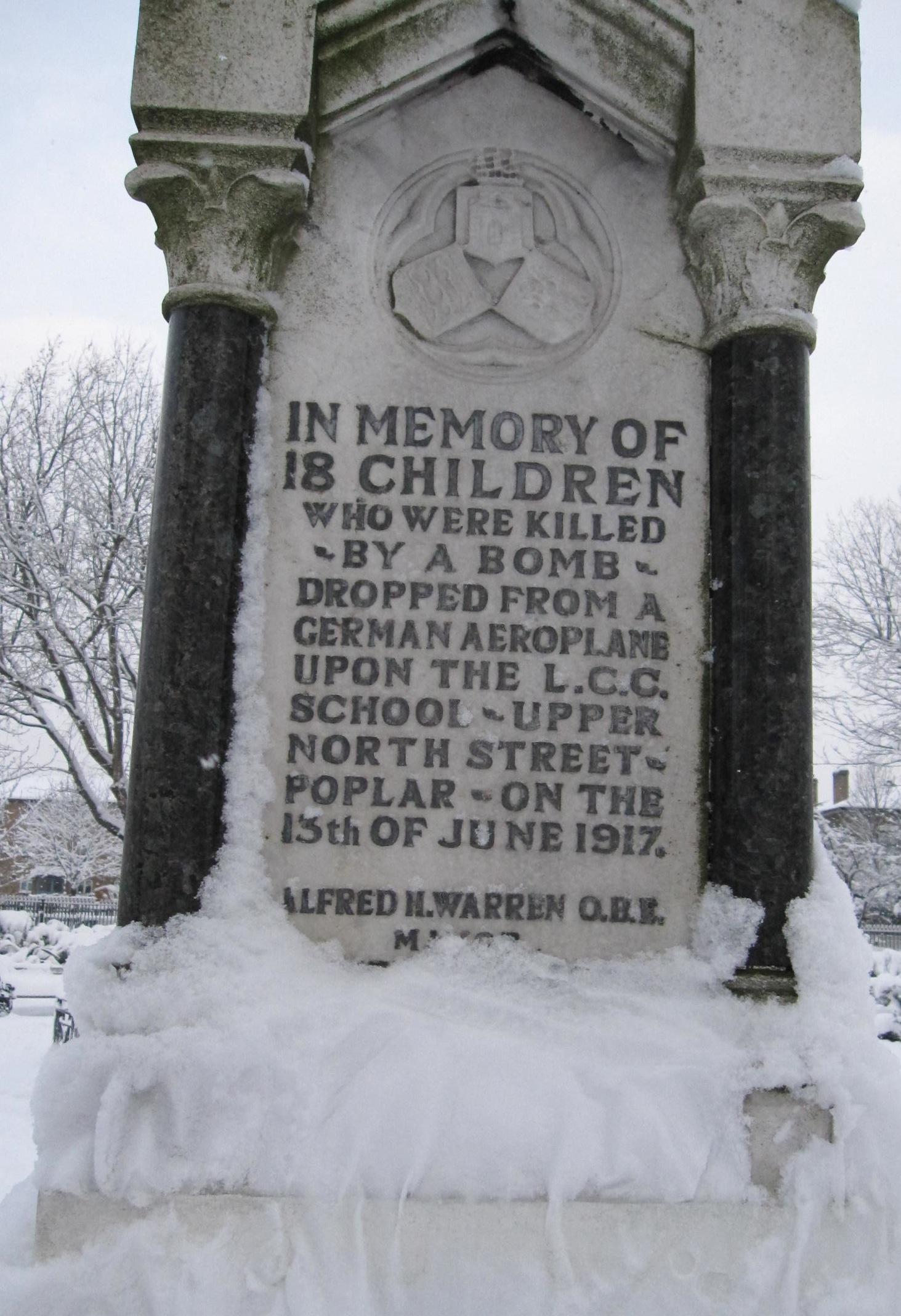
Detail of the inscription

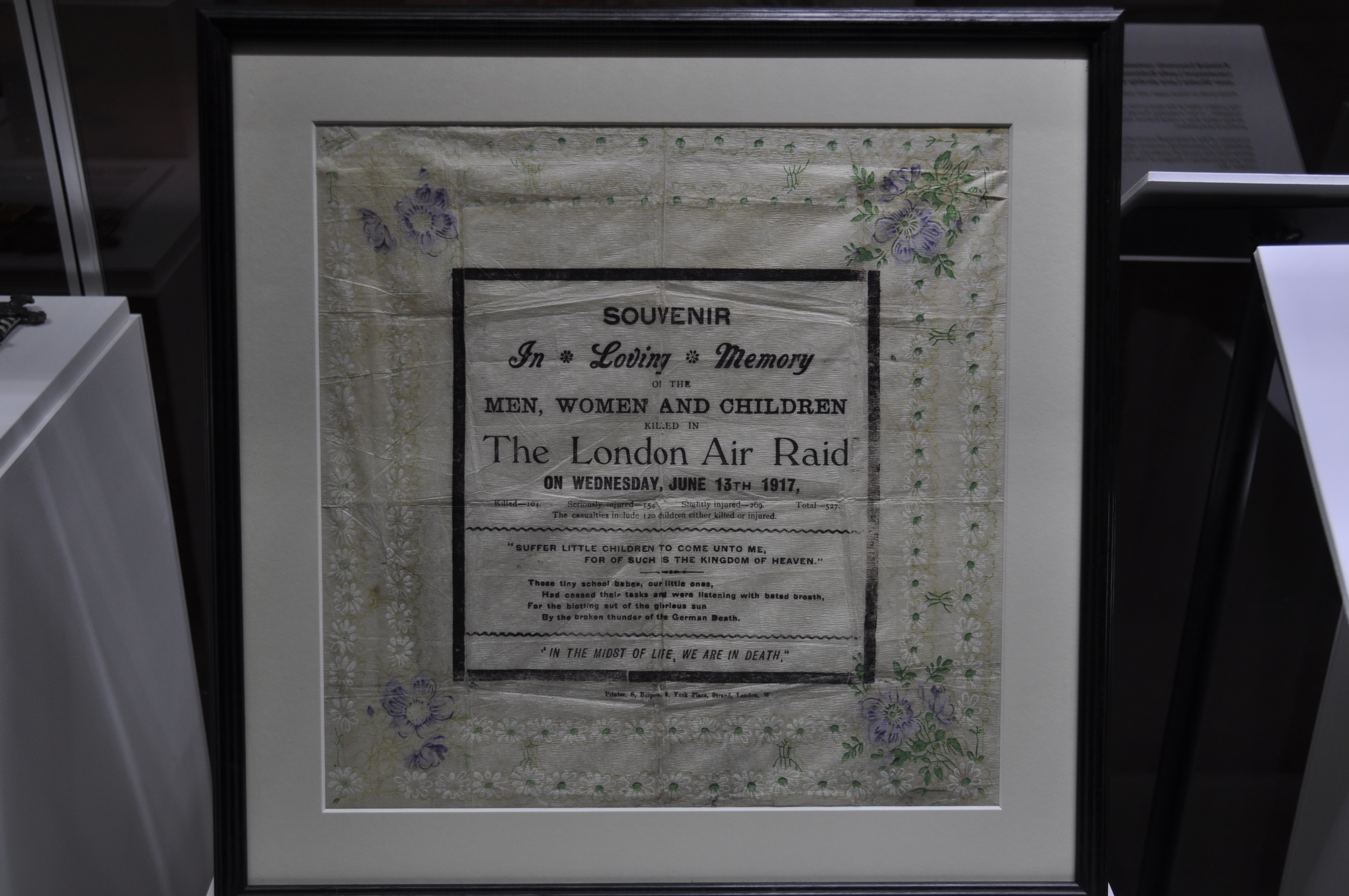
Souvenir of the raid, on display at the RAF Museum in Hendon

The Poplar Recreation Ground Memorial is a memorial to 18 children killed at Upper North Street School in Poplar on 13 June 1917, by the first daylight bombing attack on London by fixed-wing aircraft.

== Background ==
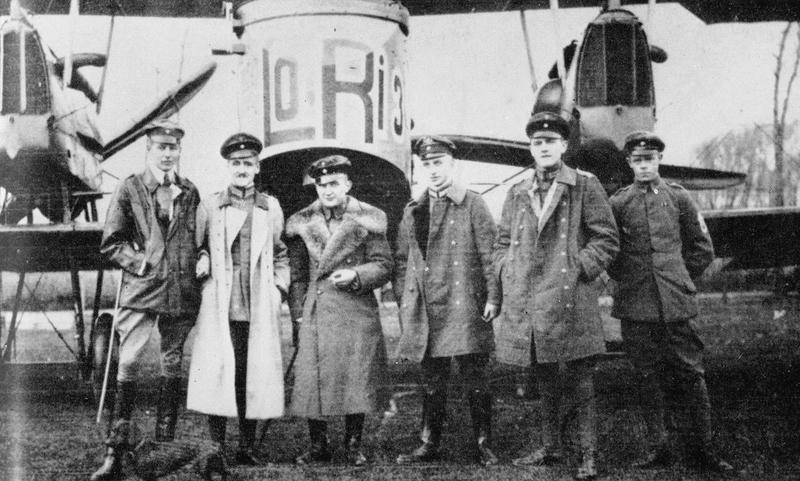
Members of Kaghohl 3 in front of a Gotha, 1917

London had faced air raids by Zeppelin airships in 1915 and 1916. The first fixed-wing bombers to attack targets in England hit Folkestone and Shorncliffe on 25 May 1917, causing 95 deaths and 195 injuries. Cloud prevented this bombing raid reaching its intended target of London. A second raid hit Sheerness on 5 June 1917.

Early on Wednesday 13 June 1917, Hauptmann Ernst Brandenburg left an airfield near Ghent in Belgium with a formation of 20 Gotha G.IV aircraft from Kampfgeschwader der Obersten Heeresleitung 3 (Kagohl 3), as part of Operation Türkenkreuz, the German plan for the strategic bombing of London. The aircraft had been fitted with extra reserve fuel tanks to enable a non-stop flight. Two quickly turned back, but the other 18 aircraft made good progress in clear but hazy summer skies. They flew over the English Channel, and one dropped bombs on Margate. Three bombed Shoeburyness, and one left to undertake aerial photo-reconnaissance over Greenwich.

The remaining 14 Gothas in two formations flew over East London. The bombers created a great noise, but were assumed to be friendly until they began dropping bombs. The Gothas continued over the city, and then turned back over Regent's Park at about 12 noon, dropping a concentration of over 70 bombs in an area within 1 mile (1.6 km) of Liverpool Street Station. Three bombs hit the station itself, where the poet Siegfried Sassoon was present on leave. Over 100 people were killed, and over 400 injured, in the deadliest air raid on London during the First World War. The dead included PC Alfred Smith, who is commemorated in the Memorial to Heroic Self-Sacrifice at Postman's Park.

British anti-aircraft guns at various locations around London opened fire, and aircraft from the three home defence squadrons the Royal Flying Corps were scrambled to intercept, but they both struggled to find a target in the hazy conditions, and none of the Gothas was lost. On his return, Brandenburg was summoned to Berlin to be awarded the Pour le Mérite, Germany's highest military honour. He was wounded in an air crash on the return flight from Berlin.

The daylight bombers were to return to London on Saturday 7 July 1917.

== Upper North Street School ==
The Upper North Street School was a London county primary school in Poplar, and is now renamed Mayflower Primary School. The school was one of the locations hit by the German bombs. One or two 50 kilograms (110 lb) high explosive bombs crashed through the roof and top two floors to explode in the classroom on the ground floor where 64 infants were taught. The explosion killed 18 children, of whom 16 were aged between four and six years old, and injured more than 30 others. Two older children were killed as the bomb passed through the upper floors, where classes for the older girls and boys were located.

A mass funeral was held on 20 June 1917, with 15 children buried together in East London Cemetery. It has been said that the last coffin contained pieces of bodies that could not be identified. The funeral service was conducted by the Bishop of London Arthur Winnington-Ingram at the Poplar parish church, All Saints Church, Poplar, together with the Bishop of Stepney Luke Paget and the local Rector and Rural Dean O.S. Laurie. The boys' band of the Poplar Training School played, and over 600 wreaths were laid.

== Memorial ==
A public fund was set up, raising £1,455 to pay for a memorial. The memorial cost £230, so some of the remaining funds were used to pay for the graves of 16 of the children, and the balance to endow a bed in the children's ward at Poplar Hospital, and another at the Lord Mayor's Home for Crippled Children at Alton, Hampshire.

The memorial was built by a local funeral director, A.R. Adams. It was unveiled by Major General Edward Ashmore, commander of the London Air Defence Area, at Poplar Recreation Ground on East India Dock Road on 23 June 1919. The memorial is in a Victorian Gothic design, built from marble and granite. A white stepped stone base leads up to a central column of white Sicilian marble, surrounded by four columns of black Labrador granite. The column is surmounted by an angel with spread wings, and inscribed with the names of the children who died.

West face
- Louise A. Acompora (aged 5)
- Alfred E. Batt (5) (son of the school caretaker)
- Leonard C. Bareford (5)
- John P. Brennan (5)
- William T.H. Challien (5)
- Vera M. Clayson (5)
- Alilce M. Cross (5)
- William Hollis (5)
- George A. Hyde (5)
East Face
- Grace Jones (5)
- Rose Martin (10)
- George Morris (6)
- Edwin C.W. Powell (12)
- Robert Stimson (5)
- Elizabeth Taylor (5)
- Rose Tuffin (5)
- Frank Wingfield (5)
- Florence L. Woods (5)

The memorial received a Grade II listing in 1973, upgraded to Grade II* in 2017. A grave marker nearby, for the 15 children buried together, received a separate Grade II listing in 2017. Also nearby is the (unlisted) gravestone of the school caretaker, Mr Batt, died on 1 November 1917; he had pulled his son's body from the damaged building.

== See also ==
- Grade II* listed war memorials in England
