= Aerial Ashes =

British funeral company

- Company type: Private
- Industry: Death care
- Founded: 2019
- Founder: Christopher Mace
- Headquarters: Christchurch, Dorset
- Area served: United Kingdom
- Owner: Matt Young
- Website: www.aerialashes.co.uk

Aerial Ashes is a British multirotor unmanned aerial vehicle company founded in 2019 in Christchurch, Dorset.

== History ==
Aerial Ashes was started by Christopher Mace, a helicopter pilot in the Royal Air Force. Mace was asked to scatter the ashes of ex-RAF airmen over the sea, creating meaningful experiences for families. After refining techniques for optimal scattering, he retired and founded Aerial Ashes. The company uses drones with modified load boxes to release cremation ashes at chosen locations, offering a respectful, innovative service. In March 2021, Aerial Ashes was the first and only company in the UK granted an operational safety case by the UKS Civilian Aviation Authority to scatter cremated ashes by drone.

In 2022, the company teamed up with A.W.Lymn The Family Funeral Service and gained a much greater reputation, being featured in The Telegraph and BBC, where Mace commented that the idea of founding the company came about after scattering the ashes of ex-military personnel at sea, assuming that each person wanted to be scattered in a specific place. The company was influential in countries such as Spain, where other companies chose to provide the same services, and it also caught the attention of the country's authorities. This year, British funeral home JC Atkinson also teamed up with Aerial Ashes to include the services provided in its catalogue.

In April 2024, Matt Young purchased the company and moved to a multi-site operation providing service throughout the UK, including Scotland. In this year, the media described the project as a "touching farewell to a loved one". In that year, the company also offered the private beaches of Beachy Head and Seven Sisters.
