= Death care industry in the United States =

Post-death service industry

The death care industry in the United States includes companies and organizations that provide services related to death: funerals, cremation or burial, and memorials. This includes for example funeral homes, coffins, crematoria, cemeteries, and headstones. The death care industry within the U.S. consists mainly of small businesses, although there has been considerable consolidation over time.

The death care industry in the United States is controversial due to the exorbitant costs of services, as well as the adverse impact of common U.S. funeral practices. The practices of death care companies are frequently supported by onerous state regulations that hike up prices and worsen environmental effects.

== History ==
The advent of embalming in the normal course of preparation of corpses for burial led directly to the transition of death care from a job predominately performed by women at home to an industry. During the Civil War, hundreds of soldiers died away from home and the process of embalming aided in preserving the bodies until they could be transported for burial. The process gained popularity after the funeral procession of Abraham Lincoln's embalmed corpse. Early techniques in embalming were primitive: an article in 1898, written in the Journal of Medicine and Science criticized and brought to attention the manner in which the arsenic used to preserve corpses had leached into the soil and the groundwater near cemeteries. The first embalming school, Cincinnati School of Embalming, was created in 1882. As a means of monitoring and establishing the protocol for handling corpses, the first mortuary schools were established in 1898, along with the National Funeral Directors Association, which is still the leading industry association today.

Prior to the mid-19th century, the dead were prepared, dressed, and displayed by their own family. The body was displayed in a homemade or purchased casket in the family's home. Wealthier families had "proper" rooms that held their finest possessions during viewings, and some family homes had a separate door known as a "coffin door" or "death door" to remove the body as it was custom for the body not to cross a doorway where the living crossed.

Embalming emerged during the Civil War since many soldiers were dying on the battlefield and their families wanted their bodies sent back home for burial. Dr. Auguste Renouard, a pioneer in the field of embalming, published The Undertakers' Manual in 1878. The first embalming school, the Cincinnati School of Embalming, was founded in 1882 by Joseph Henry Clarke, and in 1883, Dr. Renouard opened the Rochester School of Embalming. The push for embalming occurred simultaneously with the move away from families caring for the dead and for undertakers to organize themselves as "professionals". The first professional trade association was established in Philadelphia in 1964.

The first national convention for funeral directors was held in Rochester, New York in 1882 after Alan Durfee, a Michigan funeral director planned a successful statewide convention. The first constitution of the National Funeral Directors Association was drafted in 1882.

The industry underwent changes as the public responded to Jessica Mitford's The American Way of Death in 1963. The book was released at a time when consumer consciousness and empowerment altered Americans' buying and spending habits. Due to the response to Mitford's book, the Federal Trade Commission began its own investigation of the death care industry in the 1970s. By 1984, the FTC issued the Federal Trade Rule which included regulations such as requiring funeral directors to provide detailed, itemized price lists to all clients, informing clients that embalming is not required by law, and allowing clients to choose non-traditional alternatives.

=== Millennial impact ===
Millennials have been raised in and grown up in a time of extremely rapid technology growth. As such, the marketing strategies required to reach them will need to change. Several moves the industry may take include the use of technology, using social media, and offering non-traditional services or venues. "Millennials don't want to die any more than any other generation. They are just embracing the need to discuss tough subjects, like death." The topic of death and the career paths dealing with the dying process are becoming less taboo in the media, and with social media influencers, younger generations are learning more about death positivity. Additionally, this generation is not only expected to impact the industry based on their spending but also through their labor. By 2030, millennials will constitute 75% of the workforce for the death care industry.

== Services in the industry ==
=== Funeral homes ===
Funeral homes constitute the most diverse sub-sector of the industry as the operations of the funeral home includes selling burial and memorial products, memorial services and venues, and preparations of the body for burial or cremation.

=== Cemeteries ===
The operations that run at cemeteries include interment rights, burial and memorial products, as well as grounds maintenance.

=== Manufacturers ===
Manufacturers are the ones who actually create the burial and memorialization products including caskets, urns, and headstones.

== Consumer protection ==
A number of factors make this business unique from the customer's point of view, according to the Federal Trade Commission. Funerals are among the most expensive purchases many consumers will ever make; most often, a consumer goes through the decision making for this process once, so that there is little experience, and often few sources of information are used; and those making funeral decisions may be under time pressure and significant emotional duress. Funeral homes are regulated under the Funeral Rule.

Beginning in 1972, the FTC began investigating the funeral industry. In August 1975, the FTC released a proposal that suggested the following regulations: prices must be itemized, permission of the next of kin must be obtained before embalming, prices must be quoted over the telephone if requested, and the most inexpensive casket must be displayed with the others. Additionally, the FTC Funeral Rule outlawed false claims and efforts by undertakers to blackball funeral homes that provided cheaper services.

== Statistics ==
In the United States, there are more than 19,322 funeral homes, approximately 115,000 cemeteries, 1,155 crematories, and an estimated 300 casket sellers. Out of the 115,000 cemeteries, there are four general types: national, public, religious, and commercial, and while some may be more exclusive or expensive, burial is generally more expensive in urban centers. The total revenue produced from the U.S. funeral industry was $14.2 billion in 2016. Enough embalming fluid is buried every year to fill eight Olympic-size pools; the industry uses more steel (in caskets alone) than was used to build the Golden Gate Bridge; and it annually uses enough reinforced concrete to construct a two-lane highway from New York to Detroit.

In the 1960s, a push for large companies acquiring smaller funeral homes and cemeteries occurred. Although there has been a consistent push for consolidation, the majority of the industry still consists of small, family-owned businesses. As of 2019, there are around 19,136 funeral homes that provide funeral services in the U.S. About 89.2% of them are privately owned by families or individuals. Experts and analysts of the industry have estimated that the top six funeral operators control 25 to 30% of all funeral services in North America, with the top four owning between 15 and 20% of all funeral homes.

The industry is experiencing a recent trend toward cremation as opposed to the traditional funeral and burial services due to lower costs and increased value. In 2019, the average cost of a funeral using cremation with a viewing was $5,150, but this does not include the cremation casket, cemetery costs, or urn. By the year 2020, the rate of cremation is expected to be 56.2% versus 37.8% for burial. Regardless of choice of funerary option, the overall industry is experiencing growth due to the aging baby-boomer generation.

Between the years of 1990 and 2018, the overall average inflation rate was 2.3% per year while the average inflation rate for funeral expenses was 3.7% per year. According to the U.S. Bureau of Labor Statistics, this means that the average cost of a funeral in 2018 is 177.4% more expensive than a funeral in 1990.

== Religious influences ==
=== Islam ===
According to the Prophet Muhammad, the deceased should be treated like the living which is why Muslims are never cremated or have their bodies desecrated in any way, they are always buried. The only time that cremation is acceptable in the Islamic faith is when there are breakouts or epidemics of disease and infection or if there is not enough room for burial, as is the case in much of India. In the United States, the space for burial is not so much an issue, however, Islamic customs for a burial soon after death tend to conflict with the speed at which cemeteries work in the United States. Muslims are also not embalmed which is another major practice in the U.S. death care industry.

=== Judaism ===
There are two major values that the Jewish community embraces when dealing with death and dying: kavod hamet and nichum avelim. Kavod hamet means to "honor the dead" which involves treating the dead body with the same respect and dignity that they were treated with while living. This is the underlying basis for the tradition of Jews not opting for autopsies. The body can be prepared for burial by either a professional or a lay person. The dead are typically buried in a family plot, and cremation is prohibited by Jewish law.

=== Native Americans ===
Native American religion has Christian influences and is therefore a mixture of tribal traditions and Christianity. Since many people attend the wakes and funerals of Native Americans, funeral homes are rarely utilized. Additionally, floral arrangements are rarely used in the funeral procession or ordered by guests for the grieving family. Funeral directors must understand that, at the burial, family members and friends assist in filling the grave.

=== Buddhism ===
The mind is a very important aspect in death for Buddhists. Caregivers and family members work to achieve a calm and peaceful environment for the dying. Family members plan the funeral so funeral directors are not necessary in the funerary process. Additionally, embalming is not traditional of Buddhist and is not typically performed since there is no belief of resurrection of the body. The services may be carried out at a funeral home if the family so chooses, and it is customary for flowers and fruits to be brought. Both cremation and burial are practiced in the Buddhist religion.

=== Catholicism ===
Traditionally, Catholics hold a vigil and then a funeral service with the deceased body or ashes present. After the services, there is a graveside service for the burial of the body or ashes. Until 1963, cremation in the Catholic religion was forbidden. However, the Supreme Congregation of the Holy Office endorsed an Instruction with Regard to the Cremation of Bodies and, following this endorsement, Pope Paul VI also endorsed this instruction.

=== Quakers and Unitarians ===
These two religions utilize similar traditions for death and dying. If memorial services are utilized, the body is typically cremated immediately following or donated for educational and scientific purposes. For the ceremonies or services in these religions, there is no embalming and sometimes no caskets. The ashes are either scattered, buried in a cemetery plot, or placed in a mausoleum niche.

== See also ==
- Association of American Cemetery Superintendents
- Women in death care in the United States
