= Women in death care in the United States =

Women have had varying roles in the death care industry in the United States since its mid-nineteenth century inception.

== History ==
The funeral industry in America emerged after the Civil war as a means of disposing of the countless bodies that were accumulated during the war. Prior to this, care of the sick and recently deceased was largely done at home by women. However, the Civil War led to the need to transport many bodies long distances from their place of death to the final resting place, and thus to the common practice of embalming bodies. Due to the chemicals required in the embalming process professionals were needed to care for North America's deceased. As time progressed caring for the deceased transitioned from being a practice performed in the home to an extremely profitable industry.

During the early development of the funeral industry, undertaking became one of the few trades that allowed women to participate during a time when the business world predominately consisted of “landowning, educated, white men.” Although women were not prohibited from entering the death service industry they were rarely given the position of undertaker unlike their male counterparts. During the Victorian era, women were only allowed to care for the bodies of women and children due to the time period’s strict enforcement of propriety. In addition to this fact “the further the funeral industry headed toward becoming a profession, the further women were left behind.” To further exclude women from the funeral industry, Civil War-era trades journals, for instance, The Casket and Embalmer’s Monthly, published articles to discourage women from entering the trade.

In the late nineteenth century, Lina D. Odou pioneered and advocated for women’s involvement in embalming. Odou is quoted as saying, "Over and over again have I heard mothers ask undertakers if they could not furnish women embalmers for their dead daughters, and many others to whom the dead are sacred have asked the same question, and I have invariably heard such men say there are no women to be had for such a purpose." The lack of female embalmers, due to social stigma, motivated Odou to become an expert in the field by studying in Switzerland; and later in 1899 she opened an institute for women at the undertaking establishment of the Reverend Stephen Merritt. Odou's first class graduated 10 students. She established the Lina D. Odou Embalming Institute in 1901.

== Present-day ==
Small family owned funeral homes are still in practice, although large specialist organizations managing funerals have gained prominence due to societal and technical changes and the institutionalization of death. “The funeral industry is laden with sexism and specific roles based on sex.” During the 1960s and 1970s, there was a stigma against women as funeral directors that lasted until 1980; it was extremely difficult for women to find employment in the funeral industry outside of a family practice.

In the 2010s, women started to regain prominence in the funeral industry. As of 2015, more than half (57%) of mortuary science students are women. Funeral homes such as White Lady Funerals have a staff completely composed of women.
