= A.R. Adams Funeral Directors =

Funeral director in London, England

A.R. Adams Funeral Directors Ltd is an independent family-run firm of funeral directors in the United Kingdom.

The company was established in 1900 in Bow, in London by Archibald Richard Adams. The business is now operating in its fifth generation of Adams' and has branches in Rayleigh, Thorpe Bay and Thundersley, Essex.

== Archibald Richard Adams ==
He was aged 19 when he established the company and had worked as a carpenter before opening up his first office at 187 Campbell Road, Bow. The company soon expanded and there were A.R. Adams funeral homes in neighbouring Poplar (St. Leonards Road & Bruce Road) and Leytonstone.

In 1914 he further expanded his business into Thundersley in Essex, he later expanded the company again in the 1930s to Rayleigh in Essex, both still running today. Because of his move to Essex, the London head office was left under the management of his brother, Sydney Augustus Adams. Sydney worked at Campbell Road with his wife Gertrude Adams (Lakeman) and their son, Sydney Jr and daughter Audrey.

Also working at the undertakers at the St. Leonards Road office was Archibald's Brother Frederick Nelson Adams and his wife Dorothy May Adams (Hanser).

Archibald was the first chairman of Benfleet UDC when it was inaugurated back in the mid-1920s.

He was the Chairman of the County Juvenile Bench at Southend-on-Sea, and a Masonic Master at Thundersley and Leigh Mason's Lodges, also connected with Trinity Chapter and the Grand Lodge. He was made a freeman of the city of London in 1936.

Archibald had four daughters and a son, also Archibald Richard Adams.

He was a founder member of the British Undertakers Association which later became known as the National Association of Funeral Directors. He was elected as their president in 1922.

== London history ==
Archibald was a prominent member of the East London community and was offered the role of the Mayor of Poplar but turned it down due to a heavy work load.

The firm crafted two war memorials that sit in London today, the Children's War Memorial in Poplar and the St. Michaels Church war Memorial at St Michaels Church, St Leonards Road, Poplar.

Archibald's son began working in the funeral company as a boy and upon return from serving as a soldier in World War II, took a more prominent role in the family business. Upon the death of Archibald Senior in 1948, the establishment was taken over by his son.

== Funeral Directors Essex ==
In the early 1940s the London branches were sold and a focus was placed on the Essex location; it now has branches in Thundersley and Thorpe Bay and a head office in Rayleigh. A.R.AdamsFuneral Directors Rayleigh is the head office. There are also operating as Funeral directors Southend from their Thorpe Bay office.

== See also ==
- Association of American Cemetery Superintendents
