= Deathcare =

Planning, provision, and improvement of post-death services

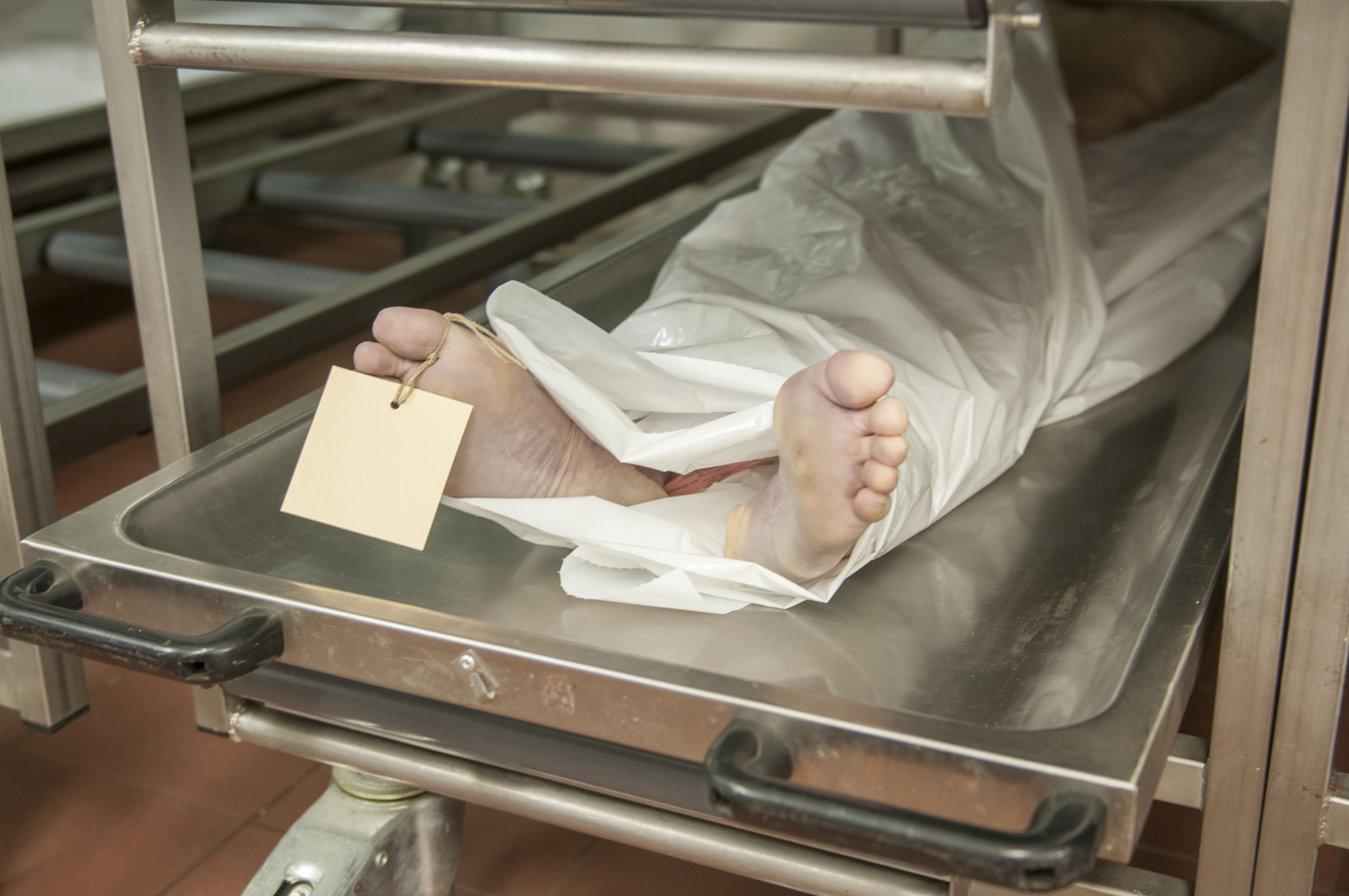
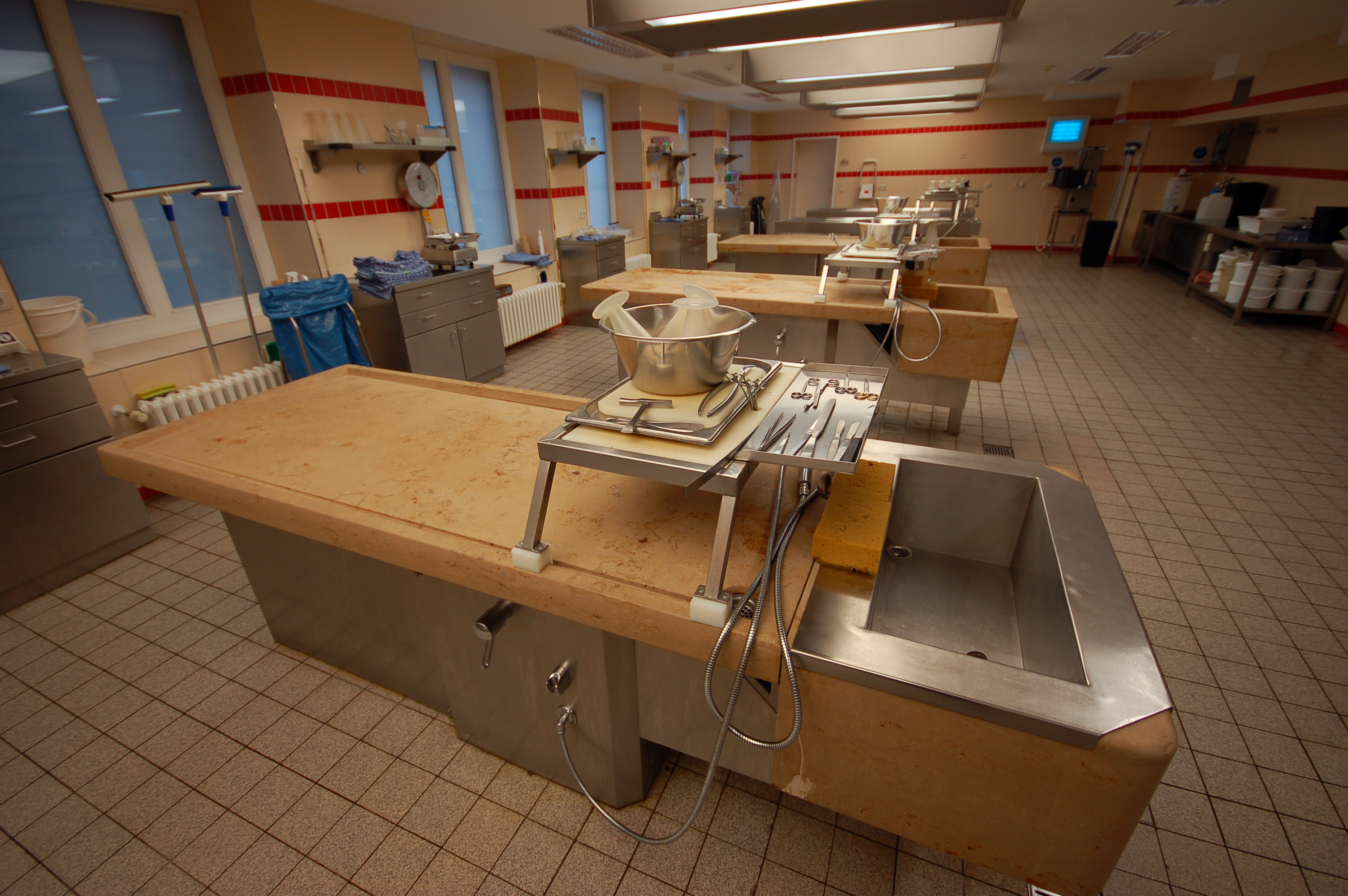
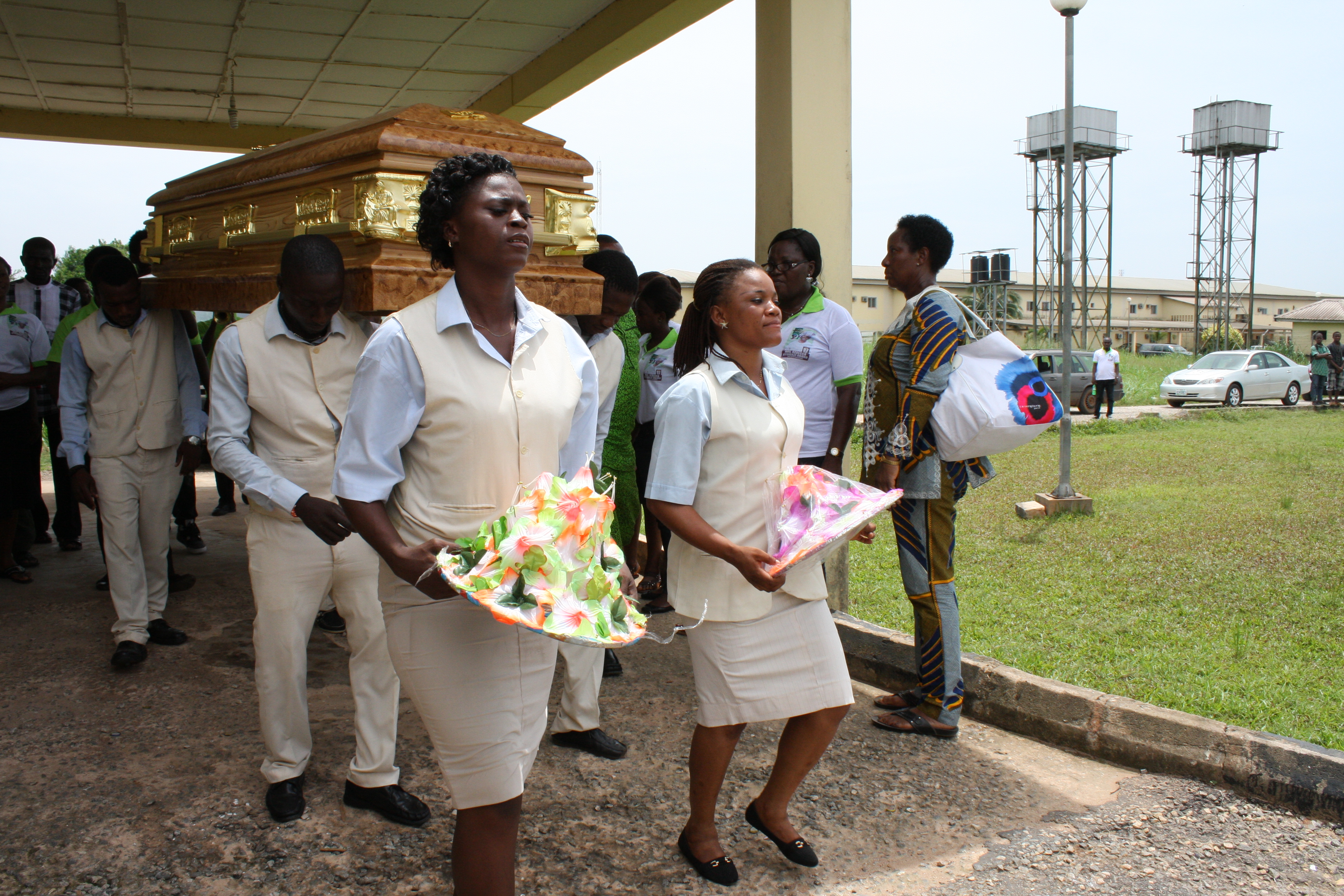
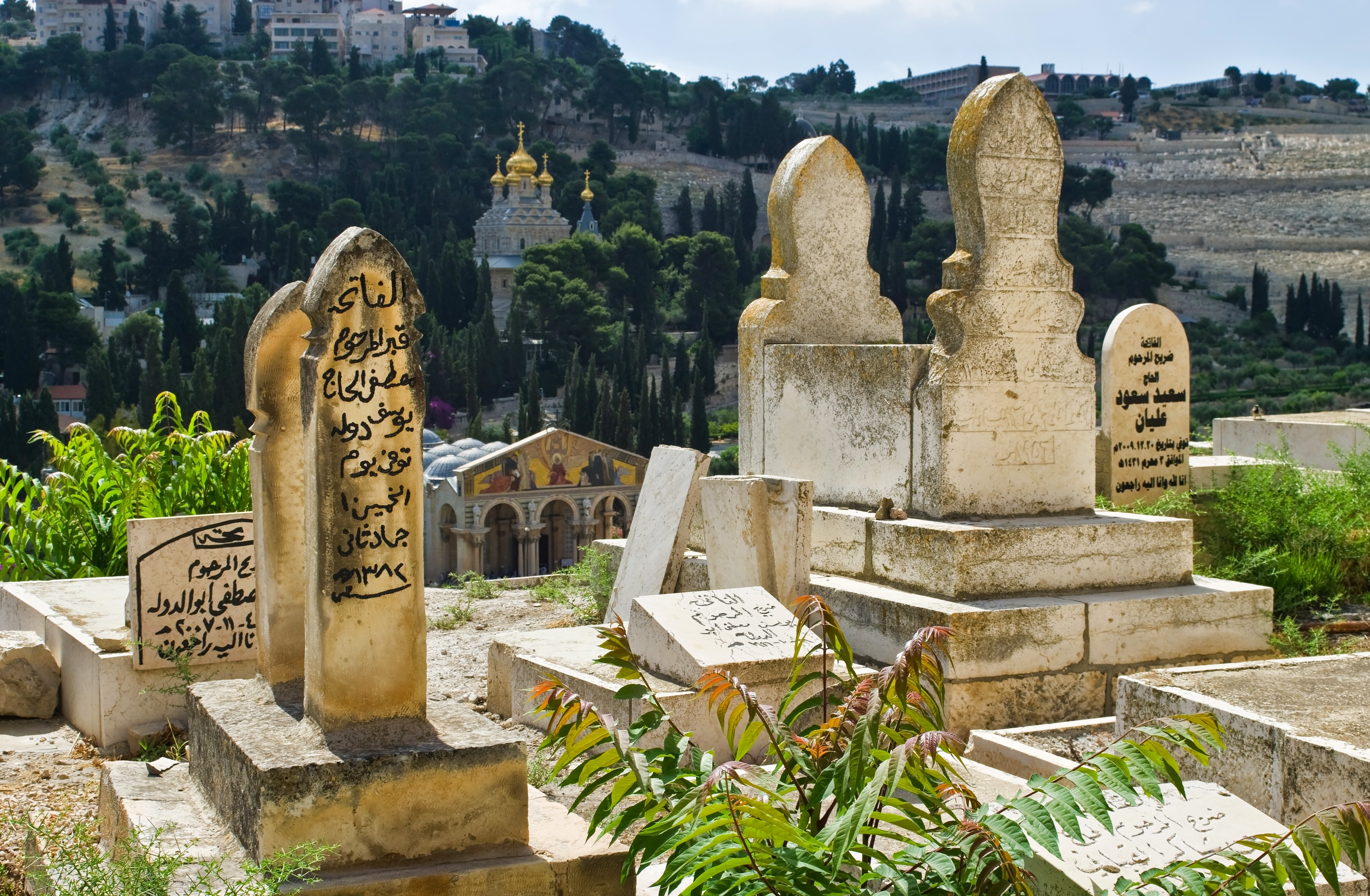
Deathcare processes. Clockwise from upper left: Body lying in a mortuary, morgue slabs with preparation tools, headstones, and funeral procession.

Deathcare (also death care, death-care or after-deathcare) is the planning, provision, and improvement of post-death services, products, policy, and governance. Here, deathcare functions to describe the industry of deathcare workers, the policy and politics surrounding deathcare provision, and as an interdisciplinary field of academic study.

Deathcare, from the point of clinical death, has a diverse timeline. The first point of care often involves immediate healthcare professionals and responders closest to the person who has died, including doctors, nurses, palliative and end-of-life care workers. From here, the care of deceased individuals has a culturally, religious, and personal course. This can involve a range of people from religious figures, morticians, to grave keepers – all of these roles formulating to what can be known as deathcare workers.

In recent years, the role of death doulas, also known as end-of-life or death midwives, has gained increasing recognition in countries such as the United States, United Kingdom, Canada, and Australia. Rooted in the broader doula movement, death doulas provide emotional, spiritual, and practical support to terminally ill individuals and their families before, during, and after death. Their responsibilities may include companionship, advance care planning, resource navigation, and helping individuals fulfill end-of-life wishes. Although their role continues to expand, death doulas are not formally regulated in many countries, and training, certification, and responsibilities vary widely. Researchers have noted the need for additional studies to evaluate their impact and support greater integration into end-of-life care systems.

== Etymology ==
The word deathcare is a compound term from the words death and care. It can also take the form of death care, however this is mostly used in the United States and Canada in the Anglosphere, where deathcare is a preferred variation elsewhere in the English speaking world reflecting on the preferred version of healthcare in places like the UK, Australia, India, etc.

== History ==
The provision of deathcare has historically and often continues to be a highly decentralized and diverse practice combining multiple actors and stages. Nonetheless, trends in providers and purveyors of deathcare do exist throughout different eras: in the time prior to the American Civil War, for instance, the majority of care for the deceased was performed by one's own family members. Specifically, women in the family were expected, as a part of their domestic duties, to oversee and execute the sanitization, dressing, and ultimately burial of their families' corpses. Following the number of deaths during the Civil War, the practice of embalming became commonplace, as fallen soldiers had to be preserved before their bodies could be transported vast distances from the battlefield back to their hometowns.

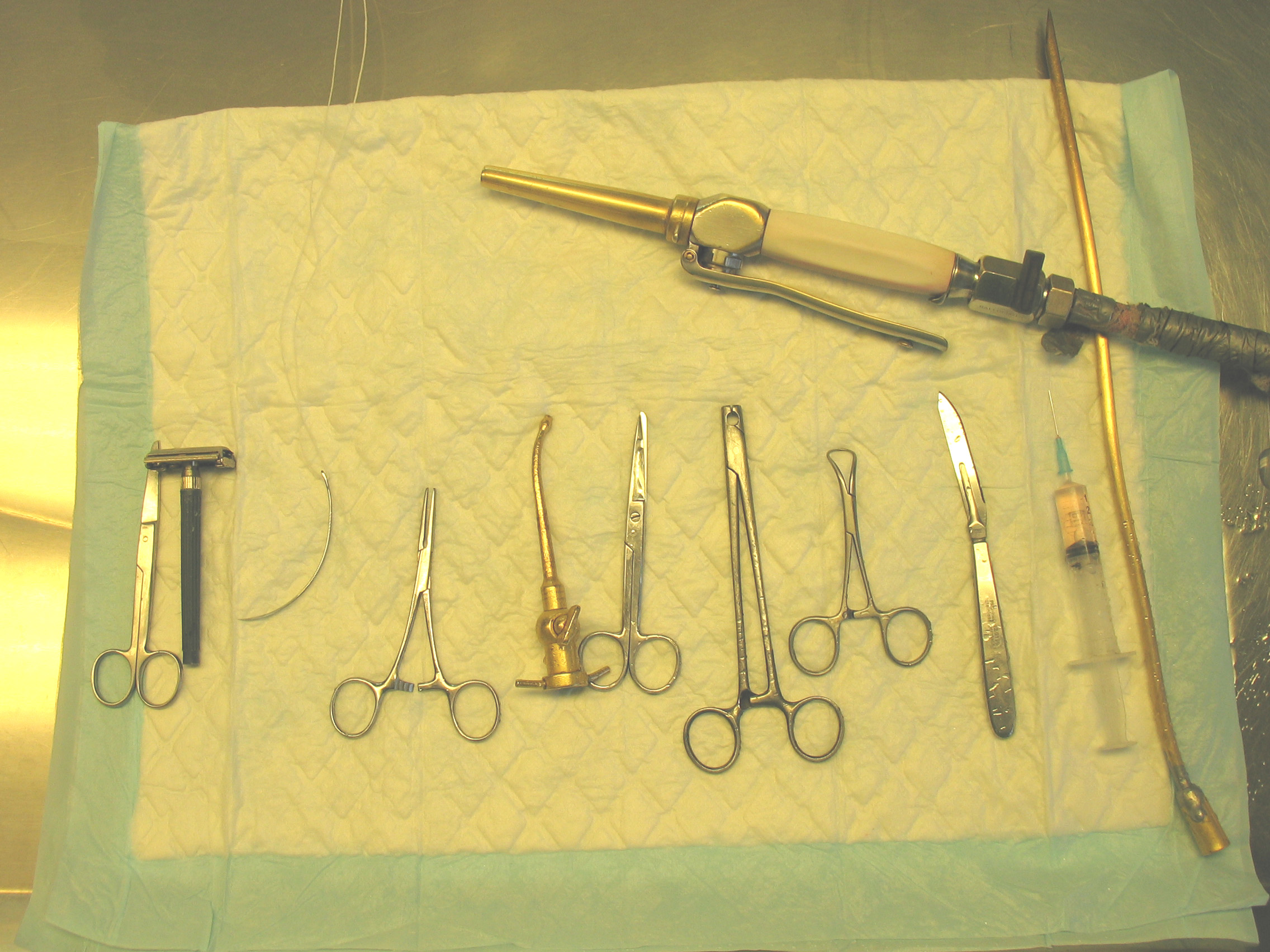
Utensils used for embalming.

Subsequent to the war, it became the norm to have loved ones’ bodies prepared and cared for by morticians, and for funeral home directors to provide spaces for services.

Contemporary embalming techniques have since evolved to emphasize improved preservation of human tissues and advances in chemical and anatomical science.

Coinciding with the professionalization of the funeral industry, the advances of the medical field changed expectations around an infectious disease course. That is, rather than comfort care, medical providers began to offer life-saving, and thus life-changing measures, e.g. antibiotics. This resulted in a change in the concentration of the placement of ill-people: rather than remaining at home, people began to rely increasingly on hospitals as a place of healing, especially in urban areas where hospitals were more accessible.

While these developments describe shifts within Western deathcare systems, many Indigenous communities globally have maintained distinct and continuous mourning traditions that differ in structure and purpose.

Western deathcare has evolved from family-led, home-based rituals to professionalized funeral practices, whereas Indigenous groups have maintained rich, culturally specific mourning practices for generations. These practices often involve elaborate rituals that serve spiritual, social, and cultural functions. For instance, many indigenous communities conduct ceremonies such as slaughtering animals, washing and dressing the body, and communal gatherings that reinforce social bonds and spiritual beliefs. Research indicates that these rituals are integral to ensuring the safe passage of the deceased into the afterlife and maintaining ancestral connections.

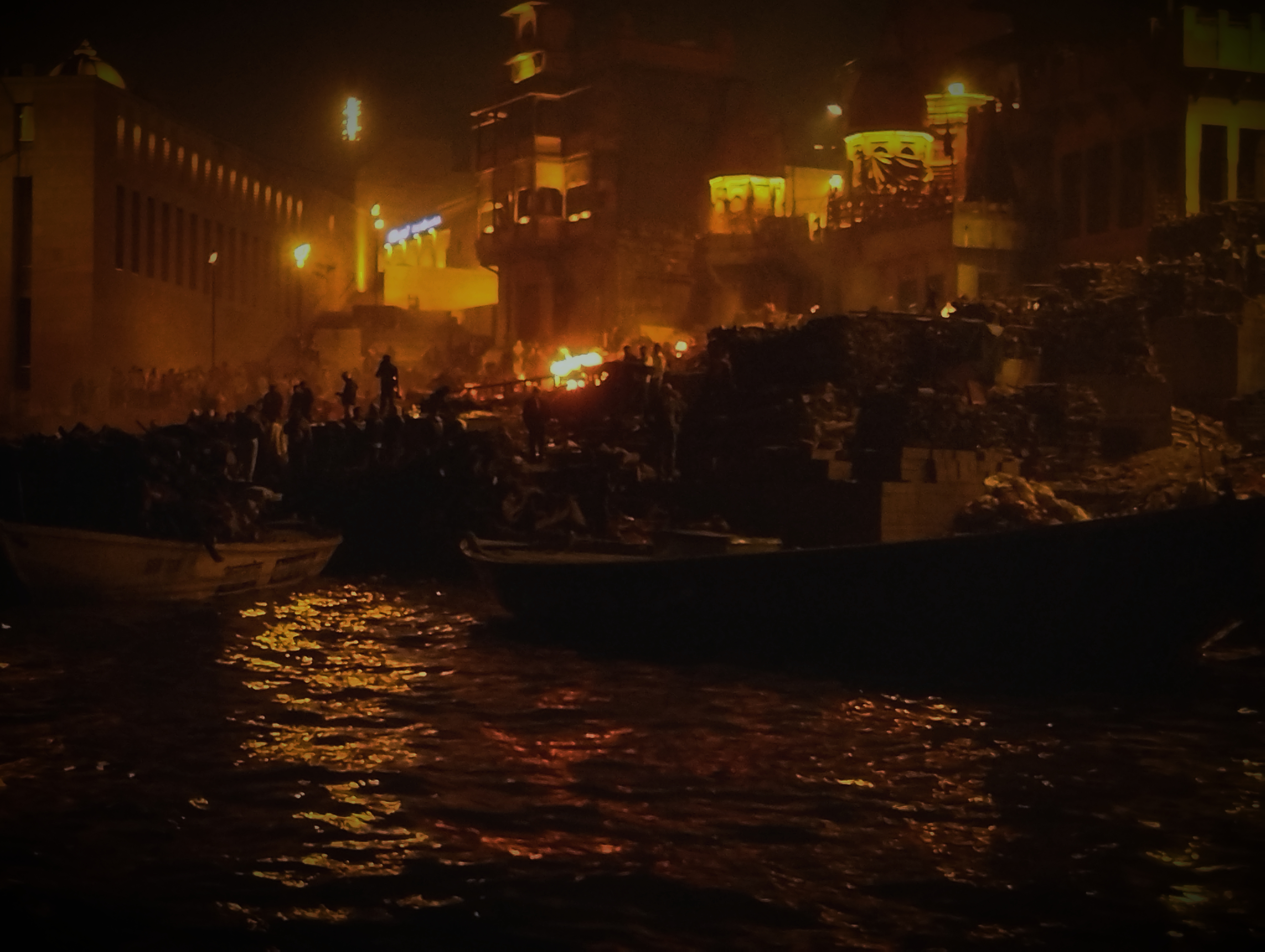
Cremation rituals at Manikarnika Ghat, Varanasi, India, one of the most significant Hindu cremation sites.

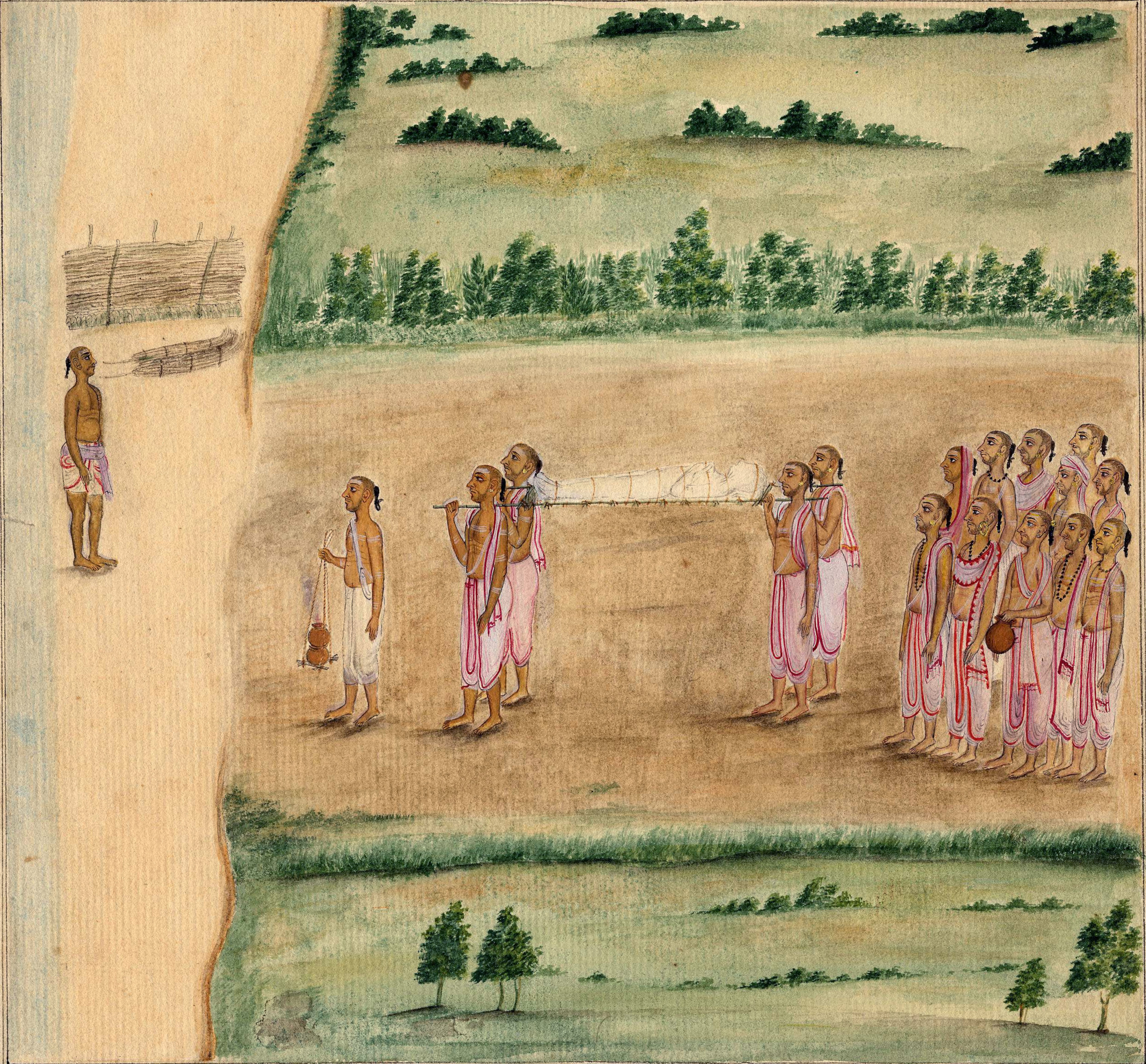
Hindu funeral ritual/ceremony.

For example, among the Basotho people of Lesotho, funeral rites include animal slaughter, burial with possessions, and communal support that emphasizes the deceased’s continued care and guidance from ancestors. Across diverse Indigenous cultures, these practices reflect both spiritual traditions and relationships with the natural environment, involving resources using animals, water, and land. Recognizing and respecting these traditions is essential for developing culturally sensitive and sustainable deathcare approaches that honor indigenous beliefs and their relationship with the environment. In areas that allowed for access to hospital systems, this inevitably resulted in a greater proportion of deaths occurring in hospitals rather than at home, thus bolstering the change from home-based care to professional, funeral home-based care of the deceased in the urban West. These shifts reflect broader changes in medicalization, industrialization, and the professionalization of deathcare practices.

Deathcare practices also vary across cultural and national contexts. In other countries, the social practices around deathcare vary compared to the U.S. For instance, in Hindu culture, women have been barred from attending cremation rituals, and even from touching the deceased. Before World War Two in Britain, women were "commonly responsible for laying-out the body", but following the war were barred from such a role given the expedient professionalization of the deathcare industry.

=== 21st century ===
The deathcare industry has undergone significant changes primarily motivated by environmental concerns, technological innovation, and public health crises. New burial methods like human composting have been recognized as a sustainable alternative to traditional burial and cremation practices. These developments reflect growing interest in environmentally sustainable approaches to end-of-life care.

The COVID-19 pandemic placed significant strain on those involved with deathcare as well as their families. Funeral service providers experienced increased workloads, operation disruptions, and emotional stress due to heightened mortality rates. Research indicates that funeral directors experienced increased rates of burnout following the first wave of the pandemic. These developments reflect increased interest in environmentally sustainable approaches to end-of-life care.

The 21st century reflects an ongoing transformation of deathcare practices shaped by sustainability concerns, technological development, and global health emergencies.

== Delivery ==
=== Government ===
National and regional governments are often responsible for providing the legal framework for deathcare to operate within, including laws and guidance on what deathcare techniques, practices, and what individuals/ organisations are involved. However, this has a varying level of non-government organisations, third-sector, religious, and private organisations (such as funeral homes) take part in both providing and shaping deathcare policy and practice. However, most research on state interactions within deathcare is limited to the US, with further research needed elsewhere.

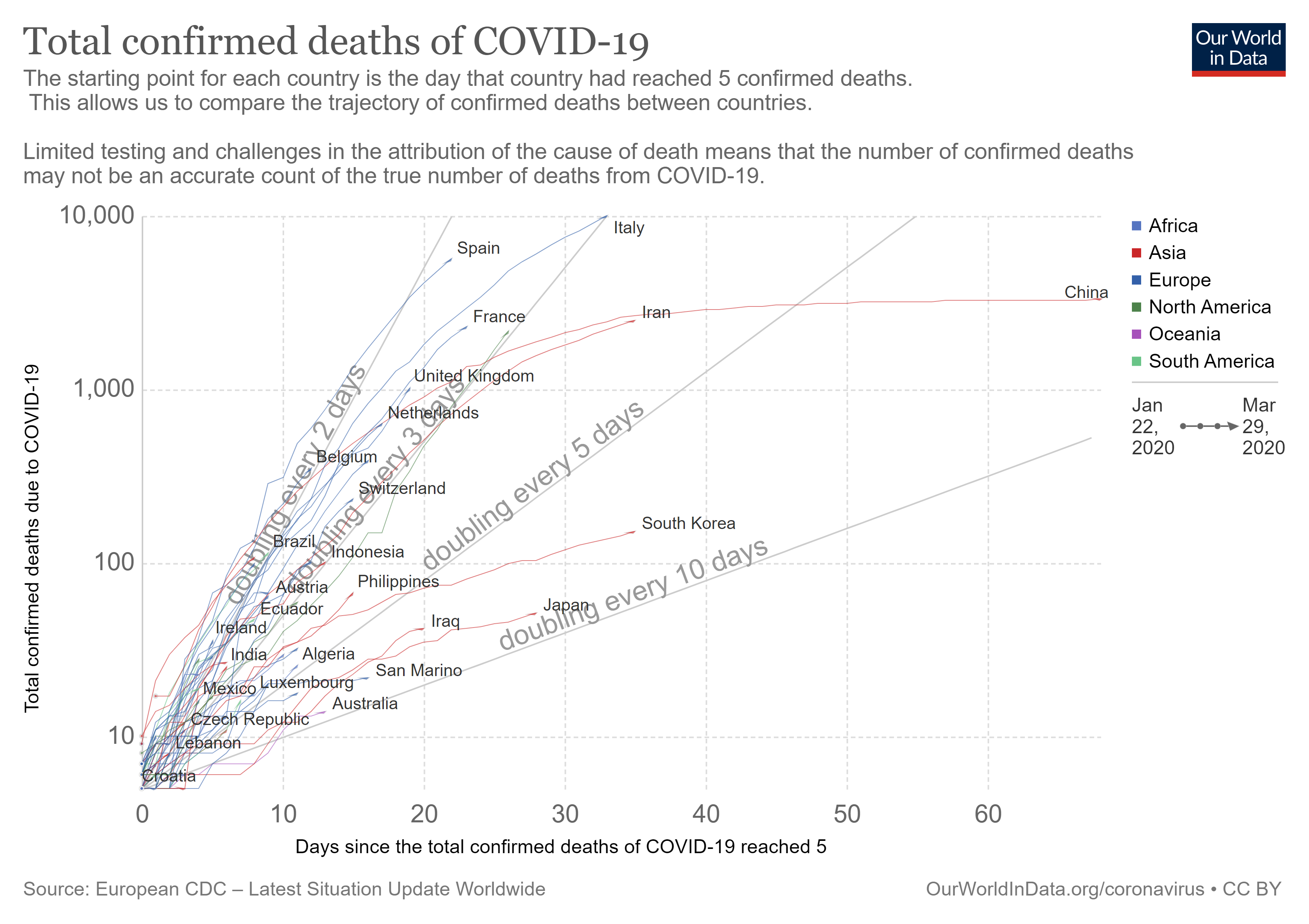
Mortality rate of COVID-19.

Governments can also become a major focal point for deathcare services in specific situations, such as with deaths in the military, prisons, or in extraordinary events. COVID-19 is an example of global governmental intervention to provide mass fatality management to cope with high human fatality around the world. This also brought up issues of inequality and inequity within deathcare as some deaths throughout the pandemic were treated as "more tragic" compared to others, highlighted as a public values failure as economic productivity and social worth overruled public health and humanity.

=== Industry ===
Analysts have stated that the deathcare industry can be divided into three portions: the ceremony and tribute (funeral or memorial service); the disposition of remains through cremation or burial (interment); and memorialization in the form of monuments, marker inscriptions or memorial art.

Deathcare industry is a multifactorial sector including, but not limited to: companies and organizations that provide services related to death memorials, funerals, and burials. Theses types of ceremonies includes service use of coffins, headstones, crematoriums, and funeral homes. Most of the death service industry has consisted of small businesses that have been consolidated as time has gone on.

There is a global marketplace for deathcare in the produces, services, and insurance that surrounds someone's death. This is a market that has shown expanding fiscal growth in years 2020 to 2021 supported by a compound annual growth rate of 5.6%. The market is expected to continue to grow to a compound annual growth rate of 8% by year 2025 expecting to reach a value of 147.38 billion dollars up from 103.93 billion dollars in 2020.

The deathcare process comes with multiple costs to allow for certain rituals to take place. Including to removal/transfer of remains to funeral homes (est $340), embalming (est $740), Hearse use ($340), metal burial casket (est $2500). The estimated median cost of funeral with burial and funeral was estimated by an NFDA news release to be $7640.

Deathcare industrial complex (DIC) has been outlined as a concept, mirroring the military-industrial complex concept, in at least the US and potentially Western countries as an industry: "profit-driven, medicalised, de-ritualized and patriarchal [in] form, modern death care fundamentally distorts humans' relationship to mortality, and through it, nature". The death care industry in the United States is deemed controversial due to high costs and negative environmental impacts.

==== Environmental impact ====
Conventional burial methods, often involving metal caskets, can contribute to soil and groundwater contamination. Cremation consumes significant amounts of fuel and produces greenhouse gas emissions and pollutants, including mercury emissions. Together, these practices contribute to land and water pollution and poor air quality.

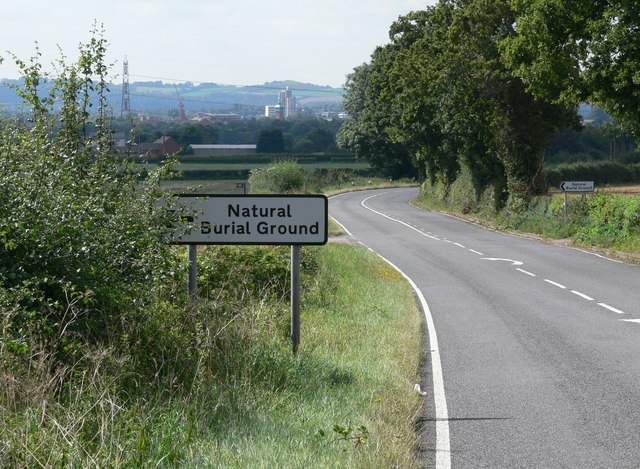
Natural burial ground.

Localized efforts to reform and expand deathcare options have contributed to the development of natural deathcare movements. As awareness of the environmental impacts associated with conventional practices has grown, interest has increased in alternatives such as natural burial, alkaline hydrolysis, and human composting. These practices are intended to reduce some of the environmental impacts associated with conventional burial and cremation.

In addition to environmental concerns, some government and industry stakeholders have introduced or explored new regulations and policies that support alternative burial practices.

Beyond environmental considerations, green burial practices have been linked to changing cultural relationships with death and mourning, especially through the ways people experience and engage with cemetery landscapes.
