= Mayflower Primary School, Poplar =

Mayflower Primary School
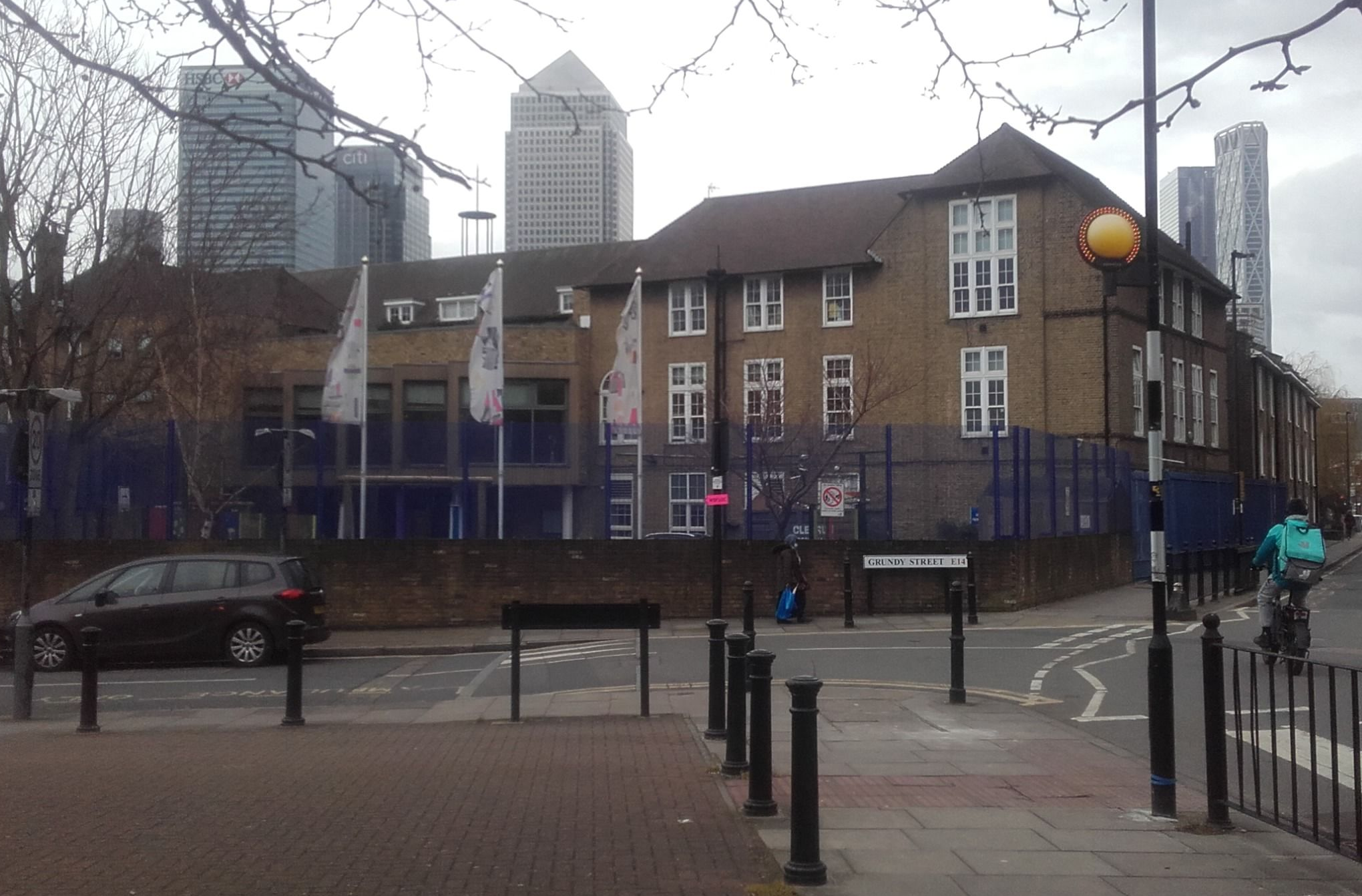
- Mayflower Primary School from Upper North Street

Location
- Upper North Street; Poplar; London, E14 6DU; England
- Coordinates: 51.511589°N 0.020289°W

Information
- Type: Community school
- Motto: Set Sail for Success
- Established: 1843
- Local authority: Tower Hamlets
- Department for Education URN: 100913 Tables
- Ofsted: Reports
- Gender: Co-educational
- Age: 3 to 11
- Enrollment: 384 (January 2017)
- Website: www.mayflower.towerhamlets.sch.uk

Mayflower Primary School is a primary school in the Poplar area of East London in the London Borough of Tower Hamlets. Originating in 1843 and formerly called Upper North Street School, it was badly damaged in an air raid in 1917 during the First World War, resulting in the deaths of eighteen children. The school was rebuilt in 1928 and adopted its present name in 1952. The school was judged to be "outstanding" at an Ofsted inspection in 2017, was awarded the title "Primary School of the Year" in 2020 and was ranked best primary school in Greater London in 2023 by a national newspaper.

== History ==
=== Origins ===
The origin of the school was in 1843 when the Trinity Chapel Day School was established. It was financed by George Green, the wealthy owner of Green's Ship Yard, Blackwell and a philanthropist who had also funded the nearby Trinity Independent Chapel with which the school was associated. In 1857, new buildings for 591 children were built in Upper New Street. Following the Elementary Education Act 1870 (33 & 34 Vict. c. 75), the school was transferred to the London School Board, who renamed it Upper North Street Board School. In 1882, a new three-storey school building was completed on the site, designed for 800 pupils between the ages of five and fourteen years. In 1895, the school board inspectors reported that there were 240 boys, 240 girls and 317 infants in attendance.

=== Bombing ===
On the morning of 13 June 1917 during the First World War, a formation of fourteen German Gotha bombers attacked the City of London. It was the first massed raid on London by aeroplanes, and there was no system of warnings in place. As the bombers began their return flight, any remaining bombs were dropped on the Metropolitan Borough of Poplar and the Port of London. One 50 kilograms (110 lb) bomb landed on the Upper North Street School at 11:40 am. It passed through the girls' department on the top storey and the boys' on the middle floor, killing a twelve-year-old boy before landing in the infants' department on the bottom floor, where 64 small children were in two classrooms separated by a wooden partition. Sixteen children were killed instantly and two died later in hospital. Thirty children were seriously injured, including one girl who was found unconscious in the rubble three days later. Only two of the dead were over five years-old.

Fifteen of the children were buried on 20 June 1917 in a communal grave at the East London Cemetery after a civic funeral. Almost £1,500, equivalent to £116,000 in 2023, was collected door-to-door to pay for a monument, the Poplar Recreation Ground Memorial, with the remainder going to local charities. Three female teachers who were in the infants' department when the bomb struck were awarded the Medal of the Order of the British Empire for Meritorious Service for their "very conspicuous courage and presence of mind".

=== Rebuilding ===
After the war, the London County Council Education Department purchased sixteen old houses adjacent to the school site, where a new three-storey school was built at a cost of £26,631 (equivalent to £1,863,000 in 2023) while the site of the old building was made into a playground. The new school opened in 1928, with places for 632 pupils. The school was renamed the Mayflower Primary School in 1952, after the Mayflower, the ship that took the Pilgrim Fathers to America in 1620 which is believed to have been built on the Thames, and symbolises the pioneering ethos of the school.

=== Royal visit ===
On 15 June 2017, Queen Elizabeth II and Prince Philip, Duke of Edinburgh visited Tower Hamlets to commemorate the centenary of the bombing in 1917. After a memorial service at All Saints Church, Poplar, which was also attended by descendants of children involved in the bombing, the royal party visited the school and saw projects on the First World War that the children had been working on.

== Present ==
At an Ofsted inspection on 31 January 2017, the school was rated "outstanding" on every criterion. Findings included:

"Leadership is dynamic and creative... The wide-ranging curriculum is rich and carefully planned. It is fun and inspires pupils to learn".

In November 2019, it was announced that the school had achieved the best standard assessment tests (SATS) results amongst 15,000 English primary schools surveyed by The Sunday Times. In November 2020, Mayflower Primary was named "State Primary School of the Year" by The Sunday Times. This was followed with top three placements in both 2022 and 2023, in which it was ranked the top school in Greater London.
