= Association of American Cemetery Superintendents =

Professional organization

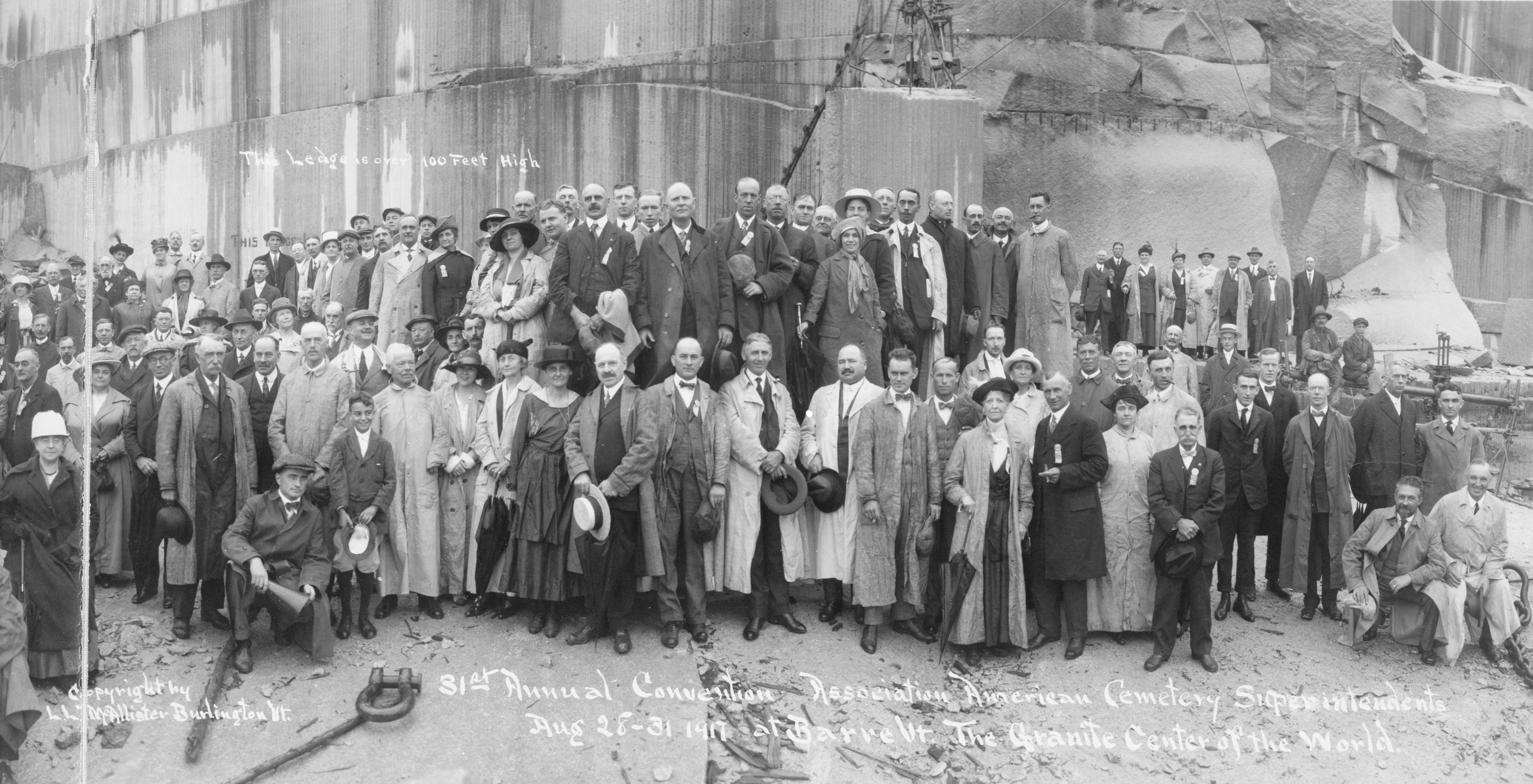
31st Annual Convention of the Association of American Cemetery Superintendents, August 28–31, 1917, at Barre, Vermont, The Granite Center of the World

The Association of American Cemetery Superintendents or AACS was an American organization formed in 1887 to share interests and to improve the fields of cemetery design, groundskeeping, and horticulture. It is now called the International Cemetery, Cremation & Funeral Association (ICCF).

== Background ==
The first movement to create an association for cemetery superintendents was started in 1886 by eighteen individuals, and the organization first met in October 1887 in Cincinnati, Ohio under the leadership of Charles Nichols. The foremost purpose of the AACS was educational, and the published works from each annual meeting became much sought after by librarians and other institutions of learning. These published works were written by cemetery superintendents, illustrating points of importance they would like share with their fellow cemetery superintendents. The Association was devoted to the betterment of cemeteries and their maintenance.

The Association was successful in improving the state of cemeteries across the United States, and in encouraging cemetery superintendents to keep their graveyards well-maintained. One example of the Association’s effect on society would be its improvement of cemeteries in rural America. One of the AACS’s concerns was that of the upkeep of rural cemeteries, and how to improve and gather interest in them. In an instance mentioned in the 20th Annual Convention Proceedings, a member of the AACS described how he motivated a group of cemetery superintendents. This group of cemetery superintendents was composed entirely of women, and they were in charge of an extremely old country church's cemetery. With the encouragement to improve their graveyard, the committee was motivated and driven to better their cemetery’s appearance and upkeep, resulting in a much more pleasant cemetery. This instance illustrates how the AACS was able to affect whole communities of cemetery superintendents, for this is but one example of the many concerns the AACS had for American cemeteries.

One of the three oldest societies devoted to conserving landscape and cemetery gardening, and rural art in the United States, the Association of American Cemetery Superintendents still exists today.

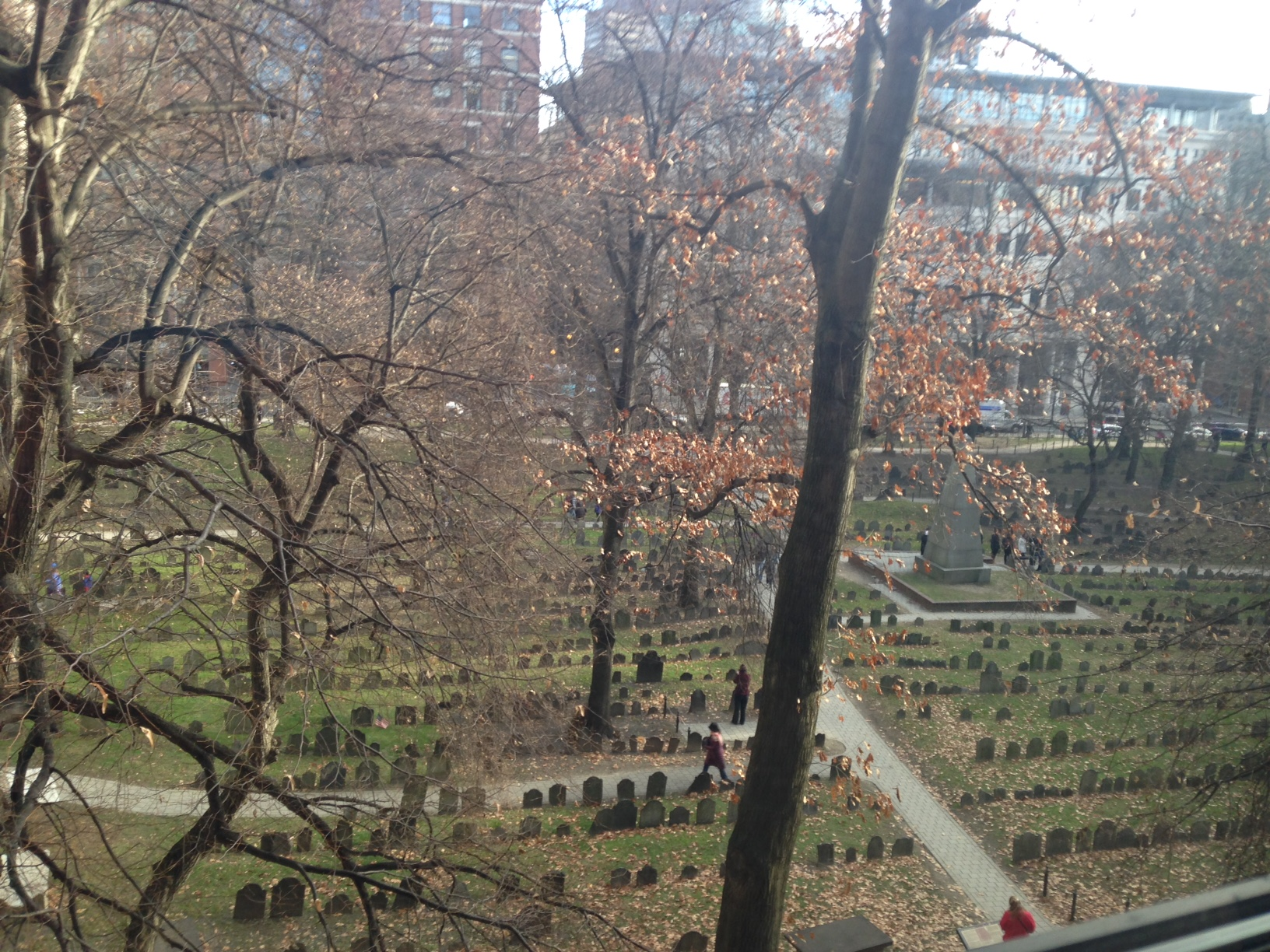

== Association beginnings ==
The Association created guidelines for plotting the grounds, headstone size, and material for vaults/monuments. In 1888, Jacob Weidenmann who was a cemetery engineer, published an essay called "Modern Cemeteries: An Essay on the Improvement and Proper Management of Rural Cemeteries". This essay diagrammed different land plotting techniques, and how to landscape different areas to improve the look of unused plots. In 1890, the AACS created guidelines for headstone size, standardized the height of grave mounds to 4 inches, and limited the amount of monuments on family plots to 1. The AACS also limited the number of vaults in a cemetery and gave recommendations to the best material to build monuments and vaults out of. These were some of the Associations most monumental improvements to cemeteries because it created guidelines to standardized the look of cemeteries while still having each cemetery be unique to what the superintendent envisioned.

== Association development ==
In the first 20 years of the association, they made great changes to all the cemeteries in their charge. They renovated and cared for the cemeteries by working on the grasses, gravestones, and other aspects of the cemeteries. One group of cemeteries that was unavailable to be helped by the association was the church yards. The church yards don't have superintendents or anyone in charge of them, which is why it was hard for the association to help them. At the Chicago convention, John Thorp had an idea to try and fix the church yards. He wanted to use the local newspaper as a way to spark concern in the community. This didn't work because the local newspapers didn't think cemeteries were worthy news. Another way that the association worked to help church yards was for the church to appoint a committee of all women and use the motto "Keep Clean". This was to make it hard for people to object to the upkeep of the church yards since it would not be considered an issue for men. The Association wanted to just get people interested in the well being of cemeteries so that the public would have a reason to keep up the cemeteries.

== International Cemetery, Cremation & Funeral Association ==
During the first century of operation the Association of American Cemetery superintendents underwent multiple name changes until landing on the International Cemetery, and Funeral Association in 1996. The word cremation was added in 2007 to represent a fuller vision of the goal of the association. The association is made of 9,100 cemeteries, crematoriums, memorials, and other services across the world. It holds conventions and meetings to update people on the laws and regulations along with educational meetings.
