= Charles Perry (bishop) =

Australian bishop

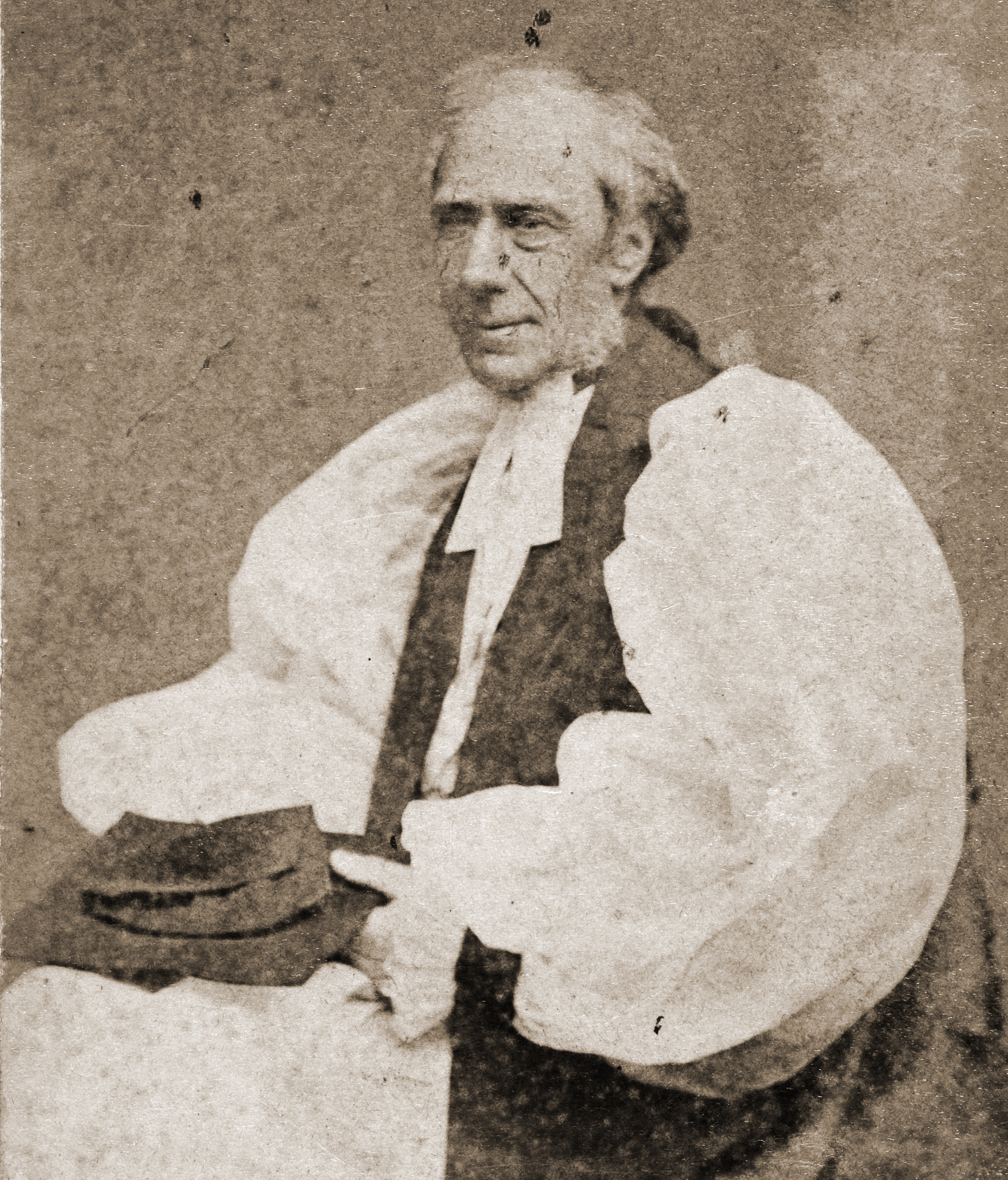
- Charles Perry, Bishop of Melbourne, 1873
- Born: Charles Perry; 17 February 1807; Hackney, Middlesex
- Died: 2 December 1891 (aged 84); Harlow, Essex
- Education: Trinity College, Cambridge
- Occupation: Christian leader
- Known for: Anglican Bishop of Melbourne
- Spouse: Frances "Fanny" Cooper

Charles Perry (17 February 1807 – 2 December 1891) was an English Australian, who served as the first Anglican Bishop of Melbourne and was a university administrator.

== Early life ==
Perry was born at Moor Hall, Old Harlow, Essex and baptised at St Mary & St Hugh, Old Harlow, the seventh and youngest son of John Perry, sheriff of Essex and shipbuilder, and his second wife, Mary, sister of George Green. The Perrys and the Greens were deeply involved with Blackwall Yard, one of the largest private shipyards in the world. George Green was a noted philanthropist, underwriting the architecturally significant Trinity Independent Chapel and its associated "minister's house, sailors' home, schools, and almshouses" and has a school named after him.

Charles was educated at private schools at Clapham Common and Hackney, then for four years at Harrow, where he played in the school cricket eleven. Perry was a contemporary of Charles Wordsworth, nephew of the poet, and Henry Edward Manning; all three young men became bishops, albeit in different churches.

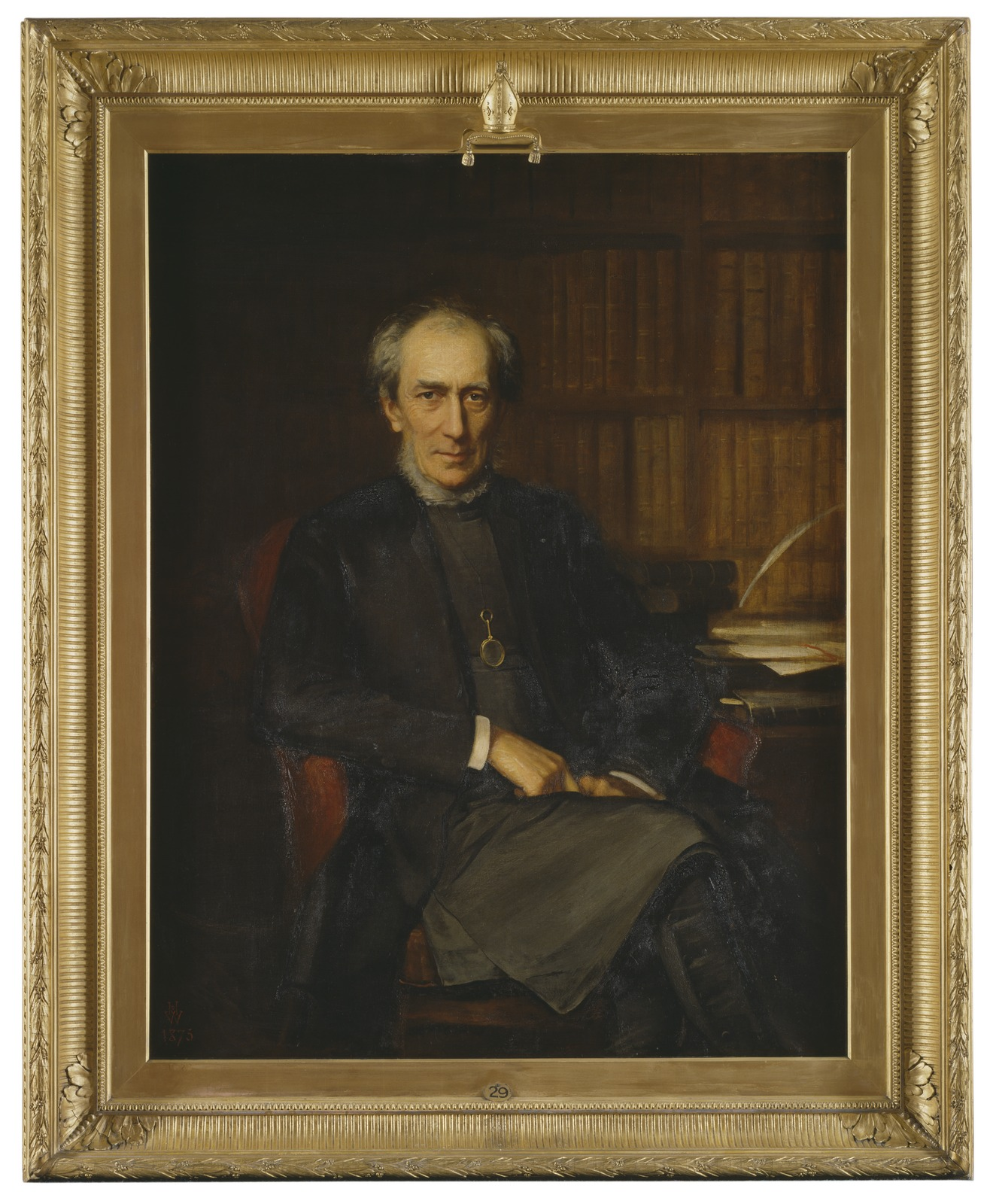
Portrait of Charles Perry, c.1875.

== Sources ==
- Serle, Percival (1949). "Perry, Charles". Dictionary of Australian Biography. Sydney: Angus & Robertson.

Church of England titles
Preceded by new position	Bishop of Melbourne; 1847 – 1876	Succeeded by James Moorhouse
