= James Marshall (VC) =

James Neville Marshall VC MC*
- Born: 12 June 1887; Manchester, Lancashire
- Died: 4 November 1918 (aged 31); Sambre–Oise Canal, France
- Burial place: Ors Communal Cemetery
- Spouse: Edith Maud Taylor (m. 1911)
- Military career
- Allegiance: United Kingdom
- Branch: British Army
- Service years: 1914–1918
- Rank: Acting Lieutenant colonel
- Units: Irish Guards
- Commands: 16th (Service) Battalion, Lancashire Fusiliers
- Conflicts: World War I †
- Awards: Victoria Cross; Military Cross & bar; Croix de Guerre (Belgium); Order of Leopold (Belgium)

Lieutenant Colonel James Neville Marshall VC, MC & Bar (12 June 1887 – 4 November 1918), was an English recipient of the Victoria Cross, the highest and most prestigious award for gallantry in the face of the enemy that can be awarded to British and Commonwealth forces.

== Military career ==
Marshall was born in Manchester in June 1887. His family moved to Oxford Road, Acocks Green, Birmingham in around 1894, his father being a draper. James Neville went to King Edwards School and after leaving worked at the Birmingham and Midland Institute and in the Medical Faculty of the University of Birmingham in a clerical capacity. He studied veterinary practice, then worked in this field in Harlow, Essex. Marshall married Edith Maud Taylor, daughter of successful maltster Mr. Henry Algernon Taylor on 20 September 1911. He started off the First World War in Argentina, buying horses but then enlisted in the Irish Guards.

He was 31 years old, and an acting lieutenant colonel in the Irish Guards, British Army, attached to the Lancashire Fusiliers, commanding 16th Battalion during the First World War at the battle of Sambre when the events took place for which he was awarded the VC.

On 4 November 1918 at the Sambre–Oise Canal, near Catillon, France, when a partly constructed bridge was badly damaged before the advanced troops of his battalion could cross, Marshall organised repair parties. The first party were soon killed or wounded, but the colonel's personal example was such that more volunteers were instantly forthcoming. Under intense fire and with complete disregard of his own safety, he stood on the bank encouraging his men and helping in the work. When the bridge was repaired he attempted to lead his men across, but was killed in the attack. Wilfred Owen was killed in the same engagement soon after the bridge was crossed as he encouraged his men.

He was also awarded the Croix de Guerre (Belgium) and was made a Chevalier of the Order of Leopold (Belgium). His Victoria Cross is displayed at The Guards Regimental Headquarters (Irish Guards RHQ), London, England.

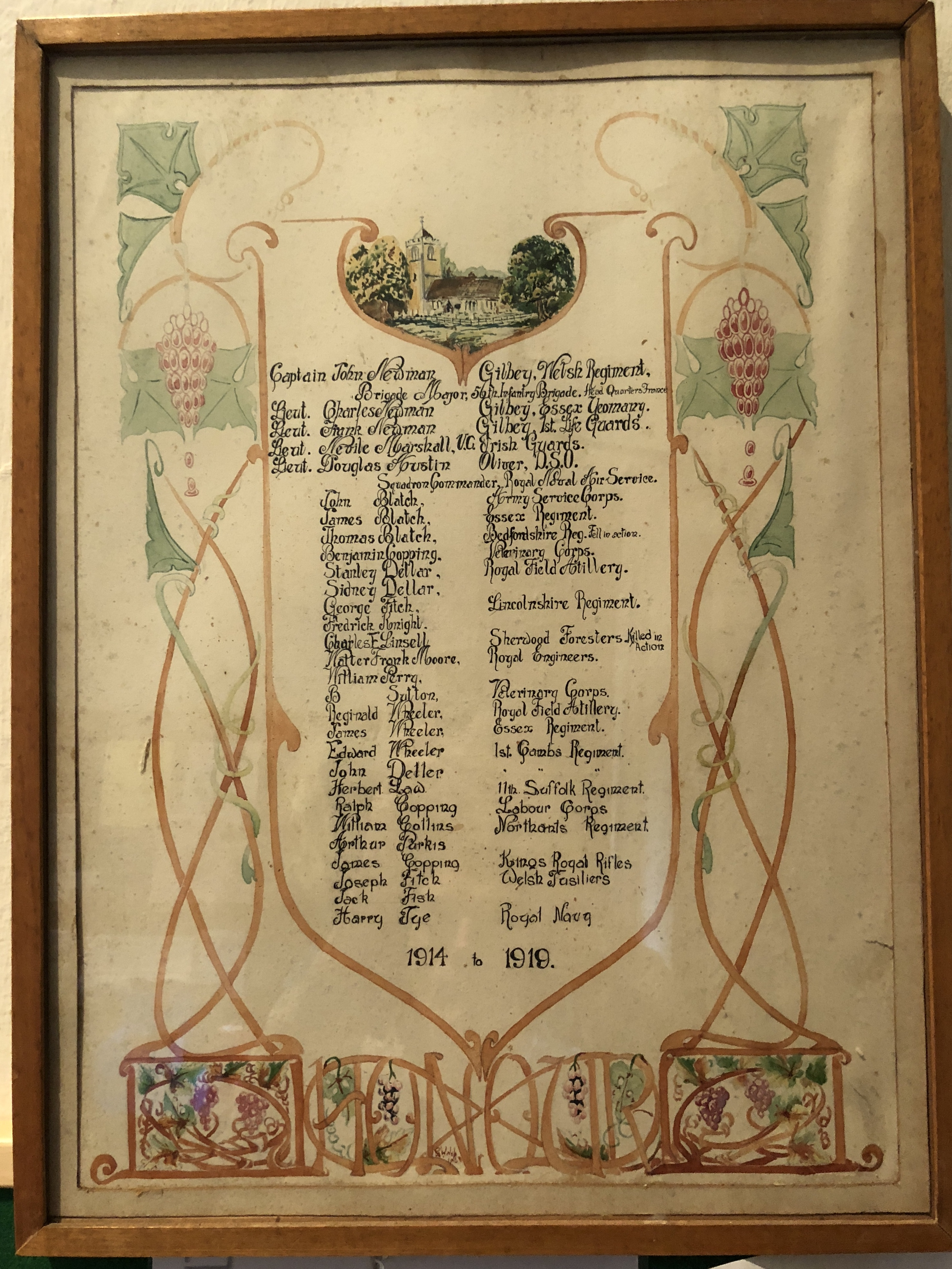
First World War Roll of Honour, from Latton's church. James is shown as Neville, 4th one down from the top.

Marshall is commemorated at Harlow War Memorial Institute and on their website.

Marshall is also commemorated in the Old Harlow Baptist Church, St Mary's (Churchgate Street) and St Mary-at-Latton churches on their memorials to the fallen of Harlow.

James Marshall is also mentioned several times in Pat Barker's Booker Prize-winning novel The Ghost Road, in which he is referred to as 'Colonel Marshall-of-the-Ten-Wounds'.
