= All Saints Church, Poplar =

Church in Greater London, England

All Saints, Poplar
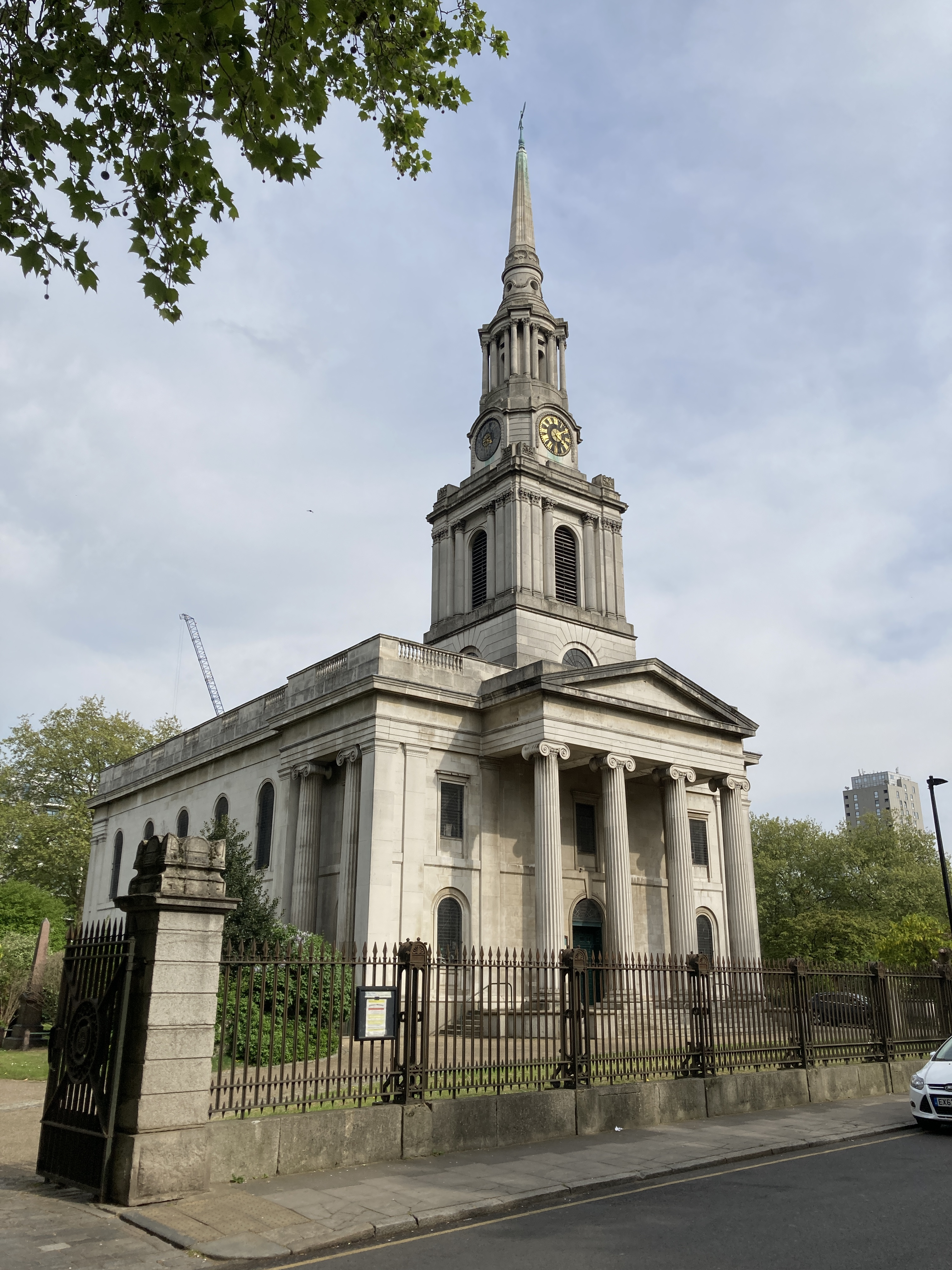

- 51°30′35″N 0°0′44″W
- Denomination: Church of England
- Churchmanship: High Church; Anglo-Catholic
- Website: poplar.church

History
- Dedication: All Saints

Administration
- Province: Province of Canterbury
- Diocese: Diocese of London
- Deanery: Tower Hamlets Deanery
- Parish: Poplar

Clergy
- Rector: The Revd Phil Williams
- Vicar: The Revd Matthew Wall

All Saints Church, Poplar is a church in Newby Place, Poplar, London Borough of Tower Hamlets, and is the Church of England parish church of Poplar. It was built in 1821–3 to serve the newly created parish.

The church was designated a Grade II listed building on 19 July 1950.

== History ==
=== Early history ===
The true foundations had been laid 425 years earlier, when in 1396, the small village of ‘Popelar’ with Blackwall had been granted to the Cistercian monks of the Abbey of St Mary de Graces just by the Tower of London, and came to be known as one of the Tower Hamlets in the parish of Stepney. The settlements provided some of the labour-force for the expanding City of London, including the militiamen at the Tower, as well as crops and livestock from the newly drained marshland. By the time the land was sold off to private families under Henry VIII, the Blackwall area had also established a thriving shipbuilding and repairing industry.

=== 17th century ===
St Dunstan's, Stepney, was then the Parish Church, and baptismal records from the early 17th century show that just over half the fathers in Poplar were occupied in river or sea trades. In 1614 the spice traders of the East India Company set up their main shipyard at Blackwall with their headquarters in Poplar, served by a company Chapel (now St Matthias Old Church) built in 1652 on Poplar High Street.

Despite the ravages of plague, the population continued to grow, added to which there was an influx of Huguenot refugees to the area in 1685 who specialised in silk manufacture and weaving, starting the continuing tradition of the cloth trade in East London.

=== 19th century ===
At the beginning of the 19th century, to escape the heavy duties levied on cargoes discharged within the City itself, massive capital expenditure was risked in the building of docks eastward of the Pool of London. In 1800 the West India Docks were dug out manually across the northern reach of the Isle of Dogs, principally by Irish immigrant labourers. The dock companies built the main road in 1803 (now Commercial Road and East India Dock Road) between Aldgate and Poplar and in 1806 the East India Docks were opened. The new construction work destroyed many homes and impoverished the lives of the local inhabitants. Subsequent employment at the docks and wharves was always subject to the vagaries of the weather and of market forces. However, by 1811 the population of Blackwall and Poplar was over 7,000 and in the next 50 years it increased to 43,000.

A new wealthy class of merchants began to move into the area and in 1817 Parliament enacted a law which made Poplar a parish in its own right. A book sealed in the reign of George III, setting out the rights and responsibilities of the new parish, remains in the church archives. Among its pages is the remarkable statement “that the Rector retains the right to close off the East India Dock Road to prevent noise during the time of Divine Service.”

The Poplar Vestry set about acquiring a suitable plot of land on which to build a parish church with adjoining graveyard and rectory. The site eventually purchased consisted of a house, garden and field owned by Mrs Ann Newby, and in 1820 the Vestry invited designs for a building that would reflect Poplar's new independence and prosperity. Of the 36 that were received, the design by Charles Hollis was chosen. He had recently been appointed architect of the new parish church of St John the Baptist Church, Windsor (a replacement building completed in 1822), which is in contrasting Gothic style. Hollis had worked as a clerk to a prominent parishioner in Poplar, London, and he submitted his design under the pseudonym 'Felix'. Nevertheless, when his design was selected there were accusations of preferential treatment. The West India Dock Company wrote a letter of complaint to the Bishop of London, supported by a report by John Rennie in favour of another design, but in vain.

The architect's original scale model is on display in the Church. Hollis also designed the Rectory. A relatively expensive church for the period, All Saints was built from granite and Portland stone by the engineer Thomas Morris (whose grave lies outside to the north of the Church door). The initial budget was £20,000 but the whole project cost just over £33,000, paid for out of the rates and with loans from two parishioners, John Stock and George Green provided in two tranches in 1821 and 1823. However this supplanted a year or so later by a loan on better terms from the West India Dock Company. The foundation stone was laid on 29 March 1821 by the Bishop of London.

The Church was consecrated on 3 July 1823, and a living established under the patronage of Brasenose College, Oxford. This was sufficient for the first Rector, the Revd. Samuel Hoole, to be driven to Divine Service from the Rectory in a horse and carriage. His successor is buried immediately opposite the front door of the Church, and gave his name to Bazely Street (originally known as Bow Lane). The Ionic columns of the portico are surmounted by a façade of more Corinthian style rising to an elegant steeple about 160 feet high. The tower supports a ring of ten bells, originally supplied at a cost of £1,060 and still rung by the church's bell ringers. The bells were all cast by Thomas Mears II of the Whitechapel Bell Foundry in 1822; they were overhauled by John Taylor & Co in 1926.

Inside the Church there were grand galleries on all sides, and a pulpit which could be cranked up and raised in height for the benefit of large congregations. Above the original organ (which had been installed at a cost of £675) there were additional galleries to accommodate the children of the Poor Law Institute. One of the six Beadle’s staffs which were used to keep the children in order is still on show in the Church. The status of All Saints as a Civic Church was marked by the royal coat of arms now to be seen on the organ gallery, but which was originally positioned on the capital over the altar. The small altar was made of cast iron and contained a chest for valuables; it is now to be found in the Sacrament Chapel on the north side of the sanctuary. The altar was embellished at a later date by Martin Travers, who also designed the tabernacle for the reserved sacrament. Behind the altar was a stained glass window, the design of which was criticised so much that it is said the artist committed suicide. It was soon covered by a curtain and eventually bricked up altogether in the 1890s, at which time under the influence of the Oxford Movement the Church took on a High Church Catholic style. Great steps were built up to the new carved high altar which was commissioned from Oberammergau by the Rector, the Revd Arthur Chandler, later Bishop of Bloemfontein.

Thirty years earlier his predecessor, The Revd Thomas Nowell, had to respond to a different influence – the sudden collapse in 1866 of some major City investment banks which resulted in the swift demise of the local shipyard industry, followed by the great cholera epidemic in the same year. The gentry began to vacate Poplar for the healthier climes east of London. An elegant brass plaque at the east end of the Church honours the Rector for his tireless work trying to improve the social condition of his increasingly poor parishioners. This tradition of local Church involvement and support continued over the period of great social change at the start of the 20th century with the growing political activism of working people.

The churchyard on the north side of the church was re-ordered as a public garden by the Metropolitan Public Gardens Association in 1893, and laid out by the Association's landscape gardener Fanny Wilkinson. Wilkinson's successor, Madeline Agar, laid out the rest of the churchyard in 1905, and it was opened in 1906.

=== 20th century ===
In the recession years of the 1920s, which particularly affected the docks, All Saints Church reflected the times again by simplifying its ritual and decoration; the interior was painted white and the old adjustable pulpit was removed.

The Church took a leading role in cementing the community of this targeted area of dockland during the Blitz of the Second World War. Many of the finest edifices of Poplar were destroyed and bombs constantly damaged the Church building, although this did not dissuade hundreds of people from using the crypt as an air-raid shelter. Late in the war, however, a V-2 rocket devastated the building, destroying the east end and bringing down the roof. Post-war restoration in the 1950s saw the removal of the galleries and the placing of a new organ gallery at the west end, equipped with choir stalls and housing the large reconditioned Hunter organ brought from Clapham Congregational Church and reconditioned by Mander Organs. Structurally, the roof had to be supported by a high steel grid, masked by four substantial pillars and the plaster-covered beams in the ceiling. The restored high altar was placed under a new and massive baldacchino, but more recently this canopy has been cut in half and the front section placed against the east wall to form a kind of reredos. A restoration appeal in the 1980s was launched to carry out essential repair work to the tower and outside of the Church, whilst the redecoration of the inside took place in 1991 through the voluntary efforts of parishioners and by means of an anonymous donation of labour and scaffolding from a local builder. The Churchyard was re-landscaped and totally refurbished with a grant from the Heritage Lottery Fund in 1999.

In 1964 the Parish of Poplar was formally established as the first Team Ministry in the London Diocese, combining nine different parishes in an area now recognised as one of the poorest in terms of overcrowding, unemployment and multiple deprivation, all under the shadow of the Canary Wharf development. A modern parish centre has been created out of the crypt space below the Church, from which bodies were removed in 1989 and re-interred in the Parish Guild Ground at the East London Cemetery. In order to construct the new crypt centre the pews had to be temporarily removed and the Church floor broken up. This was replaced by a modern steel and concrete structure and a new floor incorporating a heating and air-conditioning system. The Crypt is also used for meetings and conferences.

In 1999 the decision was taken to re-open St Nicholas' Church on the Aberfeldy Estate, and a growing congregation now worships there.

== Organists ==
- (n.d.) Charles James Packham Stalain (1879–1942)
- (1839–1858) Elizabeth Stirling (1819–1895)
- (in post in 1874) Mr J. Grout
- (in post in 1895) Louis Delabene Marsden A.R.C.O. (1867–1943)

== See also ==
- All Saints DLR station which takes its name from the church
- List of churches and cathedrals of London
