= Spanish ironclad Arapiles =

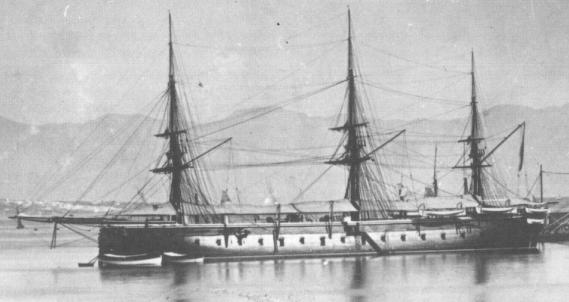
- Arapiles at anchor

History

Spain
- Name: Arapiles
- Namesake: Battle of Salamanca, known in Spanish as the Battle of Arapiles
- Ordered: 10 April 1861 (authorized as screw frigate); 10 January 1863 (ordered as armored frigate)
- Builder: Green, Blackwall, London
- Cost: 6,601,672 pesetas
- Laid down: 1 June 1861
- Launched: 17 October 1864
- Acquired: 14 September 1868 (delivered)
- Commissioned: 1868
- Decommissioned: 14 November 1878
- Stricken: 1881
- Fate: Scrapped 1883

General characteristics (as built)
- Type: Broadside ironclad
- Displacement: 3,441 long tons (3,496 t)
- Length: 280 ft (85.3 m)
- Beam: 52 ft 2 in (15.9 m)
- Draft: 17 ft (5.2 m)
- Installed power: 2,400 ihp (1,800 kW)
- Propulsion: 1 shaft, trunk steam engine; 6 boilers
- Sail plan: Ship rig
- Speed: about 8 knots (15 km/h; 9.2 mph)
- Complement: 537
- Armament: 2 × 9-inch rifled muzzle-loaders; 5 × 8-inch rifled muzzle-loaders; 10 × 68-pounder smoothbore guns
- Armor: Belt: 114 mm (4.5 in); Battery: 100 mm (3.9 in)

Arapiles was a wooden-hulled armored frigate in commission in the Spanish Navy from 1868 to 1878. Begun as an unarmored wooden screw frigate, she was converted into an ironclad warship while under construction. She was based in Cuba during the Ten Years War. Damaged when she ran aground in 1872, she was under repair in the United States in 1873 as tensions rose between the United States and Spain over the Virginius Affair . The ship was hulked in 1879 due to the poor condition of her hull and was scrapped in 1883.

Arapiles was named for the Battle of Salamanca, known in Spanish as the Battle of Arapiles, fought in 1812 during the Peninsular War.

== Description ==
Arapiles was 280 feet (85.3 m) long at the waterline, had a beam of 52 feet 2 inches (15.9 m) and a draft of 17 feet (5.2 m). The ship displaced 3,441 long tons (3,496 t). She had a single trunk steam engine that drove the propeller using steam provided by six boilers that exhausted through a single funnel. The engine was designed to produce a total of 2,400 indicated horsepower (1,790 kW) which gave the ship a speed of 8 knots (15 km/h; 9.2 mph). For long-distance travel, Arapiles was fitted with three masts and ship rigged.

The ship was armed with two Armstrong 10-inch (254 mm) and five 8-inch (203 mm) rifled muzzle-loading guns as well as ten 68-pounder smoothbore guns. Sources differ on the exact thicknesses and extent of her wrought-iron armor, but agree that it ranged from three to five inches (76 to 127 mm) in thickness.

== Construction and commissioning ==
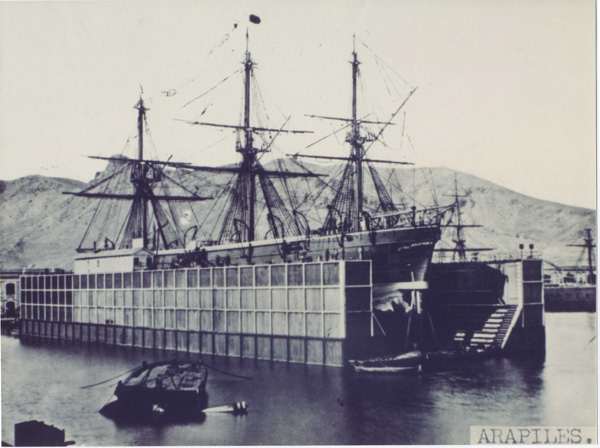
Arapiles in the Cartagena Iron Drydock in 1871.

The Spanish government authorized the construction of Arapiles on 10 April 1861 as a 4,478-ton wooden screw frigate with a steam engine rated at a nominal 800 horsepower (597 kW). It signed a contract for the ship's construction on 15 April 1861 with the British firm Green. Green laid her keel at its shipyard at Blackwall in London, England, on 1 June 1861. A year later, the Spanish government decided to reorder her an ironclad warship, and her conversion into an ironclad began in August 1862 when roughly 200 long tons (203 t) of armor was added to her hull. The Spanish government signed a contract for the conversion with Green on 10 January 1863, and the ship was launched on 17 October 1864. One source claims she was completed in 1865, but another notes that her construction encountered numerous delays due to shortages of labor and construction materials, Spain's economic difficulties, and an embargo the United Kingdom placed on Spain during the Chincha Islands War. Arapiles finally was handed over to a Spanish delegation in the United Kingdom on 14 September 1868. Her total construction cost was 6,601,672 pesetas.

== Service history ==
On 6 December 1868, Arapiles got underway from the United Kingdom for her delivery voyage to Spain. In 1870 she began an assignment to the Mediterranean Squadron. When Amadeo of Savoy, the future King Amadeo I of Spain, arrived in Spain at Cartagena on 30 December 1870, he visited Arapiles.

After the Kabyle people took advantage of French weakness during the Franco-Prussian War of 1870–1871 by beginning an uprising in French Algeria and killing most of the inhabitants of the town of Palestro, some of them Spanish, Arapiles departed Barcelona on 3 May 1871 and arrived in Algiers on 4 May to defend Spanish interests. Her arrival calmed the fears of the Spanish population of Algeria.

Arapiles left Algiers on 27 May 1871 and proceeded to Naples in the Kingdom of Italy, to represent Spain at the International Maritime Exposition there. She reached Naples on 30 May. While Arapiles was at Naples, the archaeologist Juan de Dios de la Rada y Delgado, the Hellenist, diplomat, and interpreter Jorge Zammit y Romero, and the architect Ricardo Velázquez Bosco, who had left Madrid on 27 June, boarded her on 6 July 1871 for a diplomatic and scientific expedition to the Eastern Mediterranean to collect pieces for the National Archaeological Museum in Madrid. With them aboard, she got underway from Naples early on 7 July and made a voyage in which she visited Messina in Sicily, Piraeus in Greece, Beşik Bay and Çanakkale in Anatolia, the Dardanelles, various ports in the Aegean Islands, Beirut and Jaffa in the Ottoman Empire, and Alexandria in Egypt. While returning to Spain, she stopped at Valletta, Malta, before arriving at Cartagena on 23 September 1871.

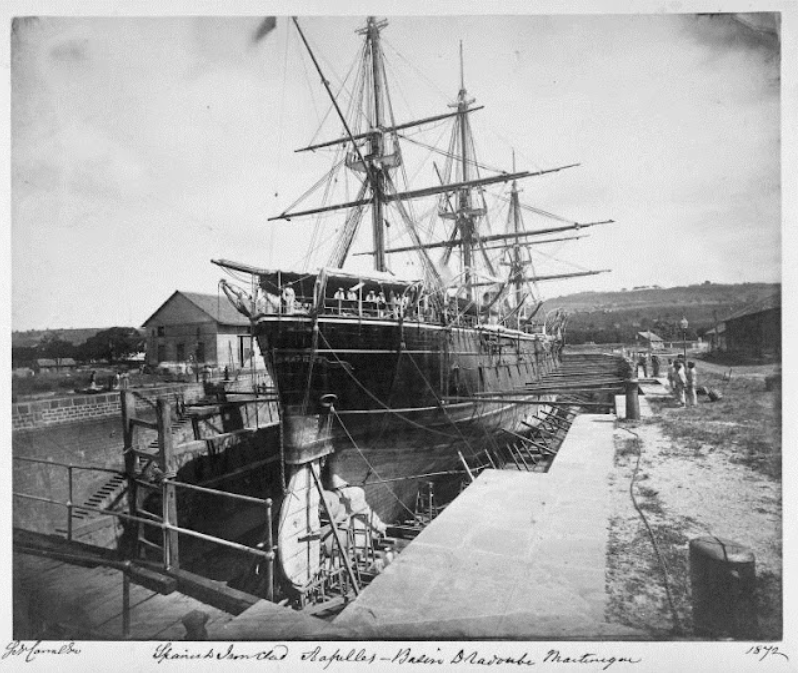
Arapiles under repair in a dry dock at Fort-de-France, Martinique, in 1872.

In 1872 Arapiles began a deployment to the Caribbean, relieving the armoured frigate Zaragoza at Havana in the Captaincy General of Cuba, where Spanish Empire forces had been fighting the Cuban Liberation Army in the Ten Years War since 1868. While on an anti-piracy patrol along the coast of Venezuela that year, she ran aground at Puerto Cabello, sustaining serious damage which left her at risk of losing her propeller. She proceeded to Fort-de-France on Martinique for repairs. The propeller was removed and the hole was plugged at Fort-de-France, but otherwise the damage was too great to be repaired in Martinique. The Spanish Navy decided to send her to New York City in the United States for repairs, but the northerly winds that prevailed at that time of year made the passage too dangerous. Instead, Arapiles put into Guantánamo, Cuba, in the autumn of 1872 to await more favorable weather in the spring of 1873.

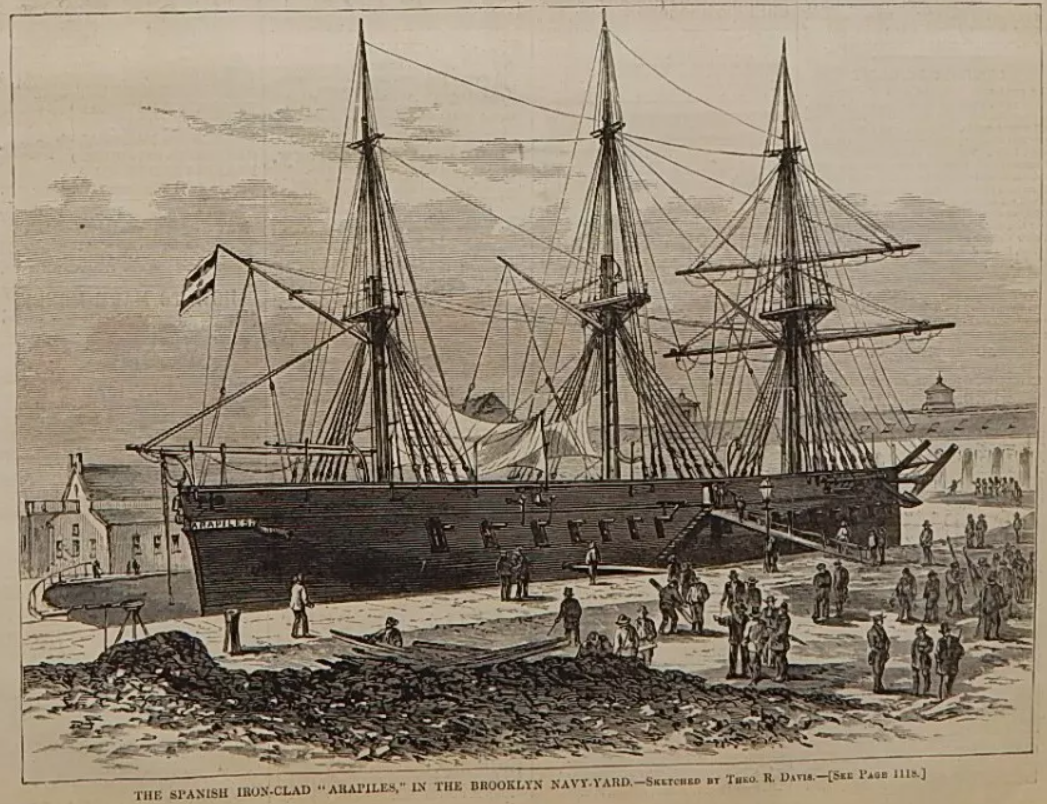
Arapiles at the New York Navy Yard in Brooklyn, New York. (Illustration by Theodore R. Davis, Harper's Weekly, 13 December 1873)

On 8 May 1873 Arapiles finally departed Guantánamo in company with the paddle gunboat Isabel la Católica for the voyage to New York City. She made half the voyage under tow by Isabel la Católica and the other half under sail. The two ships arrived at New York City on 26 May 1873, and Arapiles entered drydock at the New York Navy Yard in Brooklyn, New York, for repairs. As tensions between Spain and the United States rose in October and November 1873 during the Virginius Affair, a lighter sank and blocked the drydock's gates. When her repairs were complete, Arapiles departed New York City on 23 January 1874 to return to Havana, which she reached on 3 February 1874.

Arapiles returned to Spain in 1877. A structural inspection concluded that her wooden hull was not strong enough to support the iron plates attached to it when she was converted during construction into an ironclad. Correction of the problem was deemed prohibitively expensive, so Arapiles was decommissioned on 14 November 1878 and hulked in 1879. Her boilers were installed in the screw frigate Villa de Madrid, and her steam engines and rigging were also removed and placed in storage at the Arsenal de la Carraca in San Fernando.

An order of 6 November 1879 directed that Arapiles be converted into a floating battery, but this conversion never took place because of her bad material condition. She was stricken from the naval register in 1881 and scrapped in 1883.

== Memorial ==
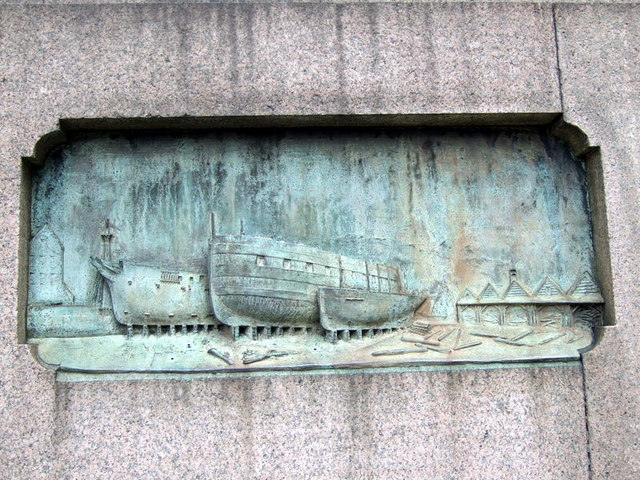
A bas relief of Arapiles on the western side of Richard Green's statue in London.

A bas relief on the side of the statue of Richard Green, who died while she was under construction in his shipyard, commemorates Arapiles. The statue stands outside the Poplar Baths in London.

== Bibliography ==
- Bordejé y Morencos, Fernando de (1995). Crónica de la Marina española en el siglo XIX, 1868-1898 (in Spanish). Vol. II. Madrid: Ministry of Defence.
- Brassey, Thomas (1888). The Naval Annual 1887. Portsmouth, England: J. Griffin. OCLC 669097244.
- González, Marcelino (2009). 50 Barcos españoles (in Spanish). Gijón, Spain: Fundación Alvargonzález.
- Lledó Calabuig, José (1998). Buques de vapor de la armada española, del vapor de ruedas a la fragata acorazada, 1834-1885 (in Spanish). Agualarga Editores. ISBN 8495088754.
- Lyon, Hugh (1979). "Spain". In Gardiner, Robert (ed.). Conway's All the World's Fighting Ships 1860–1905. Greenwich: Conway Maritime Press. pp. 380–386. ISBN 0-8317-0302-4.
- Pérez Crespo, Antonio (1990). El cantón murciano (in Spanish). Murcia, Spain: Academia Alfonso X el Sabio.
- Rodríguez González, Agustín Ramón; Coello Lillo, José Luis (2003). La fragata en la Armada española. 500 años de historia (in Spanish). IZAR. Construcciones Navales, S.A.
- de Saint Hubert, Christian (1984). "Early Spanish Steam Warships, Part II". Warship International. XXI (1): 21–45. ISSN 0043-0374.
- Silverstone, Paul H. (1984). Directory of the World's Capital Ships. New York: Hippocrene Books. ISBN 0-88254-979-0.
- "Spanish Ironclads Tetuan, Mendes Nunes and Arapiles". Warship International. XI (2): 407–408. 1974. ISSN 0043-0374.
- VV.AA (1999). El Buque en la Armada española (in Spanish). Madrid: Editorial Sílex.
