= John Stock (teacher) =

English schoolmaster (1764–1842)

John Stock (1764 – 1842) was headmaster of the Poplar House Academy, London, in the late eighteenth century and early nineteenth century.

== Biography ==
In 1786, he married Miss Parker who also worked at the school.

He is noted for being a progressive teacher interested in teaching science. He published Syllabus of Philosophical Lectures Given During Each Half Year at Poplar House Academy in 1826. One historian described him as an autodidact who nevertheless provided an exemplary education " insofar that it was energetic and practical (based on a spirit of ambitious competition amongst his pupils).

Stock educated Charles Pritchard (1808–1893), from 1822. Pritchard, a future astronomer, used some old instruments at the school constructed by James Ferguson. He went on to become Headmaster of Stockwell Grammar School.

In 1814, he had his portrait painted by Henry William Pickersgill.

In 1821 and 1823, he and fellow parishioner, George Green, provided two tranches of loans towards the building of All Saints, Poplar, a new church being built in the parish.. However this supplanted a year or so later by a loan on better terms from the West India Dock Company.

In 1833, he gave evidence to the House of Commons select committee on Public Walks raising concerns about the lack of public space for the "humbler class of Londoner"" and that this was contributing to such people frequenting public houses.

He was a visiting justice to the Hanwell Asylum.

He served as a magistrate for Middlesex and was buried in the graveyard of St Matthias Old Church, Poplar.
