= Urban Learning Foundation =

Educational outreach charity in London

The Urban Learning Foundation (ULF) was an educational outreach charity on the East India Dock Road, Poplar in London's East End. It was started in 1973 as a joint venture between the College of St Mark and St John in Plymouth and the Calouste Gulbenkian Foundation. The ULF became a campus of the University of Gloucestershire in September 2003, providing teacher training and school placement programmes and student residential accommodation.

== Courses ==
As the London Campus of the University of Gloucestershire, it offered a one-year Postgraduate Certificate in Primary Education and was the base for the North East London Graduate Teacher Programme (Primary). The university also arranged and supervised Teaching Placements in urban schools for students from other colleges around the country. Accommodation was available all year round and could be booked for periods ranging from one night to one year.

£8.3 million was spent refurbishing the London campus. Following the refurbishment, it reopened in February 2009.

== Closure and sale ==
The University of Gloucestershire announced the closure of the London Campus in September 2009. Times Higher Education quoted a spokeswoman as saying "We have decided to consolidate our business in Gloucestershire, reducing operational costs."

The London Campus was sold for £9.7 million to LHA London Limited in April 2010. The LHA was founded in 1940 to help people made homeless by the Blitz. Today with 12 sites across the city the organisation provides affordable accommodation for more than 1450 students, young professionals and those new to London, providing quality accommodation.
