= Richard Green (shipowner) =

British shipowner and philanthropist

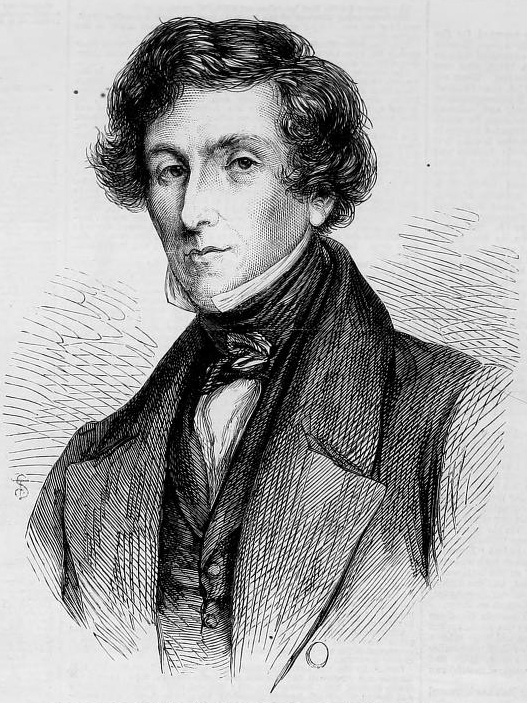
- A portrait of Green published upon his death
- Born: December 1803; Blackwall, Middlesex, England
- Died: January 17, 1863 (aged 59); Regent's Park, London, England
- Occupations: Shipowner; philanthropist

Richard Green (1803–1863) was an English shipowner and philanthropist.

== Biography ==
Green was born at Blackwall in December 1803, the son of George Green, by his first marriage with Sarah Perry, daughter of John Perry (shipbuilder) a shipbuilder of repute at Blackwall. On the introduction of the elder Green into Perry's business, he became a shipowner and fitted out a number of vessels in the whaling trade, thus laying the foundation of the house which at the time of his son's admission to the firm was styled Green, Wigram, & Green. Increasing their operations the partners took advantage of the East India Company's charter to build East Indiamen, for which they became well known.

On the death of the head of the firm and the consequent dissolution of partnership, Richard Green continued the business in conjunction with his then surviving brother Henry. Trading as R. & H. Green & Co Ltd., Blackwall, London, sailing as Green's Blackwall line. Green increased the number of vessels until the discovery of gold in Australia, when he and his brother launched a large number of ships for this voyage also. To this service they were about to add another to China, one vessel having made the voyage just before Green's death, and a second being then near completion.

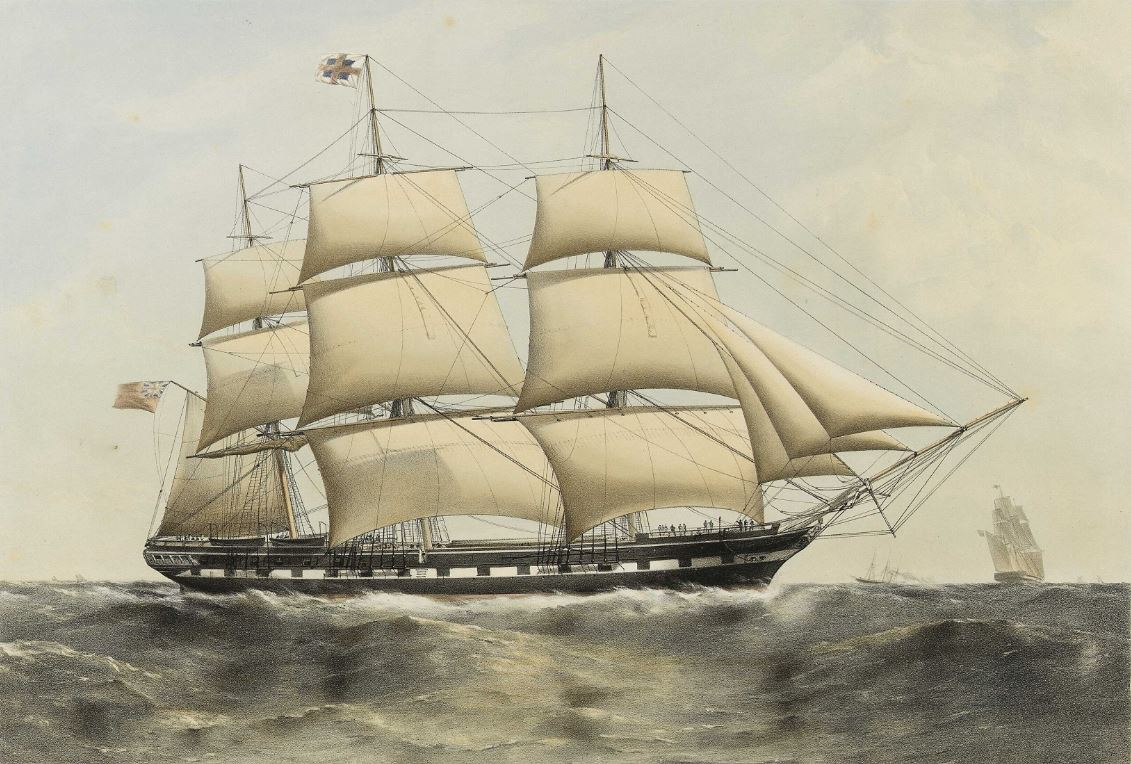
Clipper Ship Newcastle used on Richard Green's London to India service

House Flag of the Green's Blackwall Line.

Green devoted much care to the improvement of the mercantile marine. Seamen in Green's vessels were reported to have been well berthed, fed and treated. One of them said, “that if all men were like Mr Green, our merchant service would be the envy of the world.”

The establishment of a Sailors' Home for those who served on his ships was one of his earliest efforts. It was regarded as one of the better lodging houses for seamen in London. In connection with it, he provided a course of instruction in navigation for officers and men so they might advance in their profession.

He was the principal supporter of schools at Poplar, at which two thousand children were taught and partially clothed. To the Merchant Seamen's Orphan Asylum, the Dreadnought Hospital, the Poplar Hospital, and many other charities he was a great benefactor. Green was affectionately regarded in East London. He warmly interested himself in the naval reserve, and was chairman of the committee and a chief mover in the establishment of the Thames Nautical Training College HMS Worcester new pre-sea training ship for officers in the mercantile marine. His favourite saying was that "he had no time to hesitate", and he was noteworthy for his unfailing promptitude, quick decision, clear judgment, and great business acumen. He died near Regent's Park on 17 Jan. 1863, and his funeral at Trinity Independent Chapel, Poplar (founded by his father), was attended by a crowd of between 15,000 and 20,000. Green left by his will a large number of charitable bequests, including a free gift of the building and a perpetual endowment of his Sailors' Home at Poplar.

== Statue ==
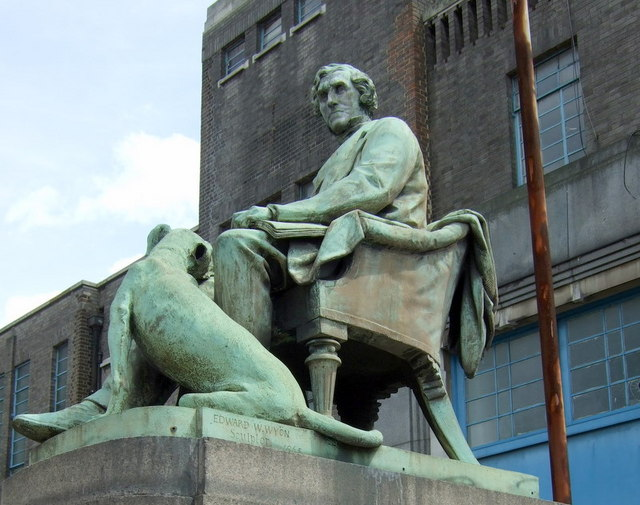
Richard Green and his one-eared dog Hector

A statue by Edward William Wyon (1811–1885), of Green stands outside the Poplar Baths, his face modeled from his death mask; with him is his faithful Newfoundland dog "Hector". The dog famously lost its ear in 1967 when a young boy got stuck climbing the statue, and the Fire Services had to cut him away. On the side of the statue there are two Bas reliefs, to commemorate his shipbuilding exploits; on one side is the Arapiles which was still under construction in his shipyard on his death, and on the other side the record-breaking Clipper Challenger which he built in 1852 to challenge American rivals in the tea trade.
