= Ephraim Seehl =

German chemist

Ephraim Reinhold Seehl (English: Ephraim Rinhold Seehl) (died in 1783) was an apothecary and chemist of German background, born in Sweden. He was known as a manufacturer of green vitriol.

== Life ==
He was the son of Captain Reinhold Seehl (d. 1721), a German volunteer who worked his way through the ranks in the Swedish army. He settled in England and was naturalised as a British subject by Act of Parliament introduced in 1783 (23 Geo. 3 c. 8).

Ephraim Reinhold Seehl (~27) married Sarah Perry (~22) (daughter of Philip Perry and Elizabeth Flemming; sister of John Perry Sr and aunt of John Perry, shipwrights of Blackwall Yard) at St Andrew Undershaft, City of London, on 19 Nov 1745.

Seehl occurs in a London subscription list in 1757. He was one of just three people with addresses in Poplar and Blackwall to be found in Thomas Mortimer's Universal Director of 1763. There his entry reads "Seehl, Ephraim Rinhold, Copperas Merchant, Blackwall; or at the Bank Coffee-house, Threadneedlestreet". At this time he was leasing the Copperas Works in Bromley from his brother-in-law, the shipwright John Perry Sr (father of John Perry) of Blackwall Yard.

Seehl traveled widely in Europe. He was a subscriber to Mineralogia Cornubiensis (1778) by William Pryce. His autograph book shows that he was almost certainly a Rosicrucian.

Ephraim Reinhold Seehl of Bromley was buried at Poplar, undoubtedly at Poplar Chapel (St Matthias Old Church) on 6 September 1783, according to St Dunstan's, Stepney, Parish Registers.

Seehl's will was proved on 12 September 1783.

== Publications ==
Seehl worked on the compounds of sulphur. The distinction of its acids, and sulphur dioxide, was not clarified at this point. The preparation of sulphuric acid was known by the beginning of the 17th century. With Augustus Sala, Nicolas Lemery and J. C. Bernhardt, Seehl is mentioned as one of those working on methods for its production. The method of making it by heating sulphur with saltpetre has been attributed to him.

Seehl published An Easy Method of Procuring the Volatile Acid of Sulphur in Philosophical Transactions in 1744. It referred to the preparation of sulphurous acid.

- A new improvement in the art of making the true volatile spirit of sulphur (1744). Seehl was mentioned for this work in Johann Friedrich Gmelin's Geschichte der Chemie.
- A short treatise upon the art and mystery of making of copperas (1768)
