= East India Dock Road =

Major arterial route in London

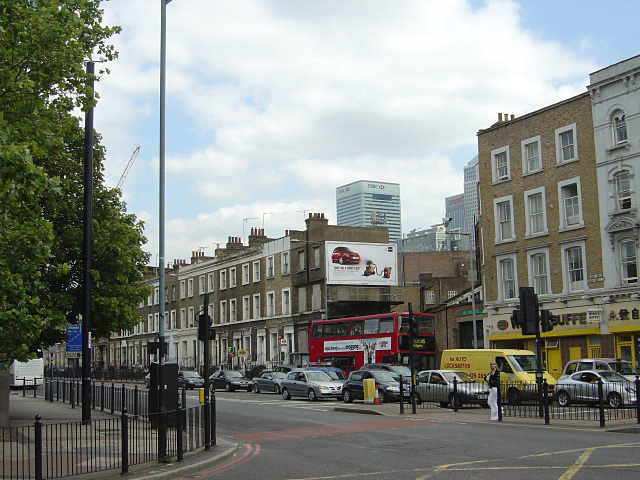
- Looking east with Canary Wharf in the background.

- Location within London Borough of Tower Hamlets
- Part of: A13
- Length: 1.3 mi (2.1 km)
- Coordinates: 51°30′40″N 0°00′45″W
- From: Commercial Road
- To: Newham Way

Construction
- Construction start: 1806
- Completion: 1810

East India Dock Road is a major arterial route from Limehouse to Canning Town in London. The road takes its name from the former East India Docks in the Port of London. To the west it becomes Commercial Road and to the east Newham Way. It forms part of the A13, a major road connecting the historic City of London to Tilbury and Southend.

== History ==
The road begins in the west at Burdett Road and continues to the River Lea bridge in the east at Bow Creek. It was built in order to connect the newly built Commercial Road at Limehouse with the East India Docks, which opened in 1806, bypassing Poplar High Street. It passed over undeveloped land and was assumed to be cheap to construct, but the costs of buying garden land proved higher than anticipated.

The original plan called for the road to be built as far as the River Lea, and it is shown ending there on Richard Horwood's 1807 map of London. In June 1809, an Act of Parliament was passed to build a crossing over the Lea towards Barking, in order to improve communications between London and Tilbury Fort. An iron bridge was designed by John Rennie, but the final chosen plan was from James Walker and Alfred Burges. It was built in 1810 and was the first road bridge to use cast-iron columns. The bridge was 150 feet (46 m) long and 28 feet (8.5 m) wide. The bridge originally charged a 2d toll, which was abolished in 1871. A new bridge was constructed by the London County Council and the Corporation of West Ham between 1893 and 1896. This in turn was replaced by the current bridge to the north, constructed in 1930-1932 of reinforced concrete.

The road was designed to be 70 feet (21 m) wide, and was constructed as such from Limehouse to the East India Docks. Beyond this, its width was 40 feet (12 m) because of the imposing geography of Bromley Marsh. Gas lighting was partially installed along the road in 1826.

The London and Blackwall Railway sought to compete with the road. By 1827, an hourly coach service was set up between the City of London and the East India Docks, covering the route in 45 minutes. The railway was built as anticipated, but well to the south, allowing the East India Dock Road to compete as a major transport thoroughfare.

== Properties ==
All Saints Church, Poplar was constructed on the south side of East India Dock Road, and consecrated in 1823. It was rebuilt after being bombed in the Second World War.

George Green's School was founded in 1828 by George Green, a shipbuilder and shipwright. It was originally located on East India Dock Road but moved in 1979.

Queen Victoria Seamen's Rest at 121-131 East India Dock Road was founded in 1843 as the Seamen's Mission of the Methodist Church.

Beside the Blackwall Northern Approach is the Blackwall Tunnel Memorial, erected when it was first opened in 1897. In 1959, when the newer western tunnel was dug, the inscription was moved to its present position underneath East India Dock Road itself.

The Poplar Baths re-opened on 25 July 2016 and were removed from the Buildings at Risk register, after campaigners had won the battle to restore the building to use in 2010.

According to Swinton Insurance, East India Dock Road was the fourth most dangerous road in London for motorcyclists in 2017.
