= James How =

English tavern owner (1716–1780)

James How (occasionally spelled James Howe; born Mary East; c. 1716 – 8 June 1780), was an English tavern owner best known for living as a married man (despite being born female) from 1732 until 1766, when legal action against an extortionist forced a permanent return to female presentation.

How's story was the subject of contemporary newspaper articles, a section in Bram Stoker's Famous Imposters, a song in R. M. Anderson's Songs From The Howling Sea, and a painting in Ria Brodell's Butch Heroes series. Their gender identity and sexuality remain ambiguous, with early sources presenting How as a cross-dressing but fundamentally heteronormative cis-woman and later sources interpreting them as a transgender man, gender-nonconforming, and/or sexually non-normative.

== Early and married life ==
Little is known about How's life before the age of sixteen, when they took on a male identity and the name "James How" in order to marry a seventeen-year-old female friend (first name unknown). The couple held a clandestine "fleet marriage" in 1732. Mr and Mrs How became respected members of their community for many years, though noted for their great commitment to privacy: they were never known to employ servants or host social functions in their home.

== Public life ==
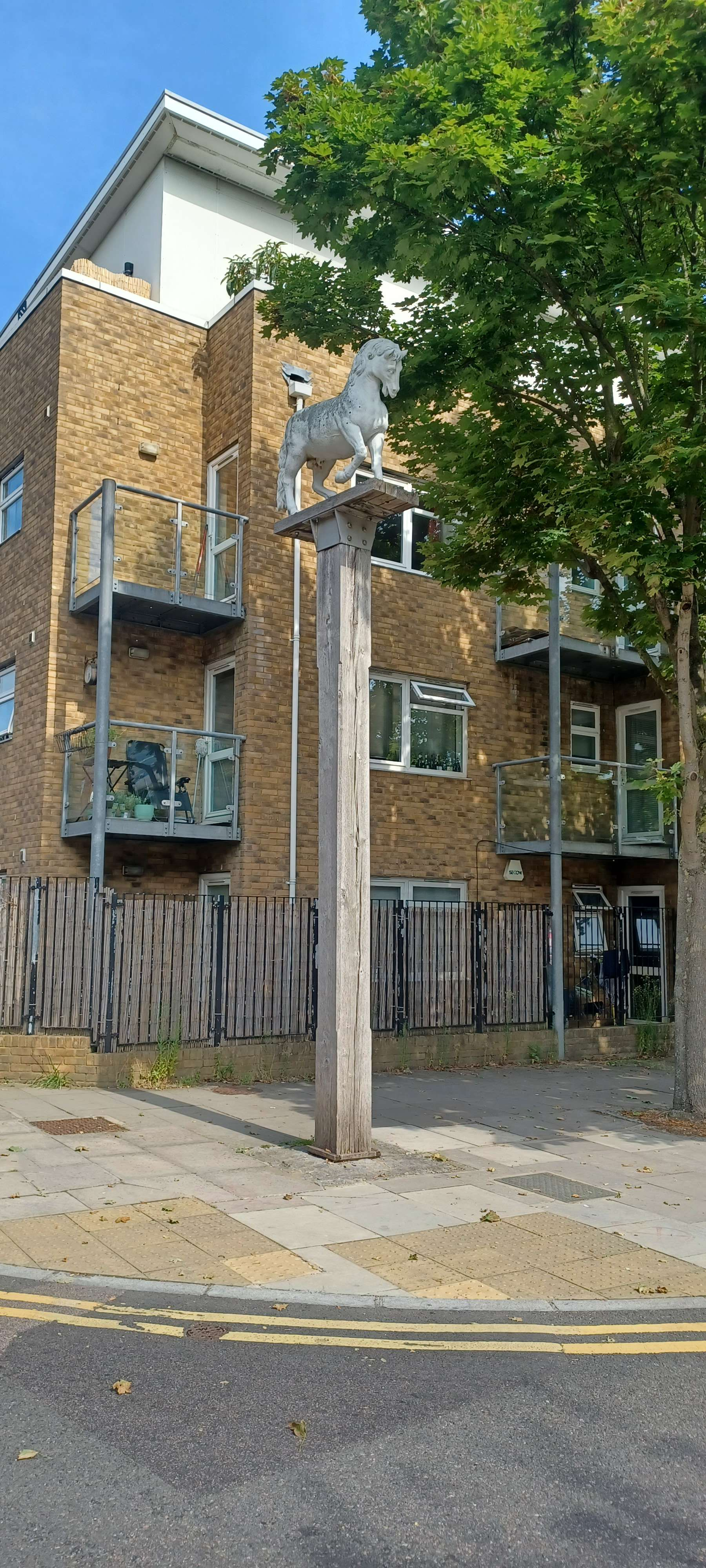
The former site of the White Horse Public House, Poplar, is marked by a Grade II listed sculpture

The Hows operated taverns in Epping, Limehouse, and then in Poplar, where they became the landlords of the White Horse Public House in 1745. Their business partnership proved profitable and they were able to purchase several more properties over the course of their marriage. How was also engaged in Poplar's civic life, serving several times as jury foreman (something prohibited to women at the time) and, at one time or another, holding every parish office except churchwarden and constable, the former of which How was slated to hold until their reassumption of a public female identity disrupted their plans.

== Extortion and court case ==
The couple successfully protected their secret for the duration of their marriage, but periodically experienced incidents of blackmail from confidants and old acquaintances threatening to expose How's past female identity. The first of these was a Mrs Bentley, who had known How as a child and demanded sums ranging from five to ten pounds for her silence during the Hows' marriage.

In 1766, on her deathbed, Mrs How confided in a friend about the nature of their marriage; this friend swiftly went to How and demanded payment in exchange for silence. The extortion attempts did not stop after Mrs How's death, as Bentley returned to blackmail How the same year. This last attempt involved her hiring two men to impersonate police officers, "arrest" How for an imagined crime, and threaten to hang them unless paid one hundred pounds. Before the imposters dragged them away, How was able to confess to and seek help from a neighbour, Mr Williams. Williams advised How to take Bentley and her accomplices to court and brought a constable to arrest How's aggressors. How reassumed the name and female presentation of Mary East to expose Bentley's extortion before the Whitechapel Justices of the Peace, evincing visible awkwardness in female garb. The case ended in the conviction of one of Bentley's accomplices (the other having escaped capture) who was sentenced to four years in prison. As a consequence of their public revelations, How (now "East") retreated from public life and lived the remainder of their days as a woman.

== Death and legacy ==
How died on 8 June 1780, bequeathing their estate to relatives, friends, and Poplar's poor. They were buried at St Matthias Old Church in Poplar under the name of Mary East.

How attracted attention during and after their lifetime as an exemplar of the phenomenon of the "Female Husband" and early modern LGBTQ+ history and identities. How's gender identity and sexuality have been subject to varying interpretations over time. Early sources like the London Chronicle (which reported on How's legal action) and Bram Stoker framed How's marriage and assumption of male identity as a means of escaping unsatisfying relations with men, with How taking the male role simply to facilitate the couple's plan (and, indeed, being assigned it by a coin toss). Writing in 1910, Stoker argued further that the Hows' arrangement was a means of escaping the stiflingly narrow socio-economic opportunities available to Georgian-era women. Later commentators have called into question these interpretations of the Hows as transgressive, but ultimately heterosexual and cis-gendered, arguing that it was possible (or even likely) that the Hows were lovers and that How was a transgender man or otherwise of nonbinary gender.

How is artistically commemorated in a song in R.M. Anderson's Songs From The Howling Sea and a painting in Ria Brodell's Butch Heroes series.

== See also ==
- Female husband
