= St Matthias Old Church =

Coordinates: 51°30′34″N 0°0′58″W

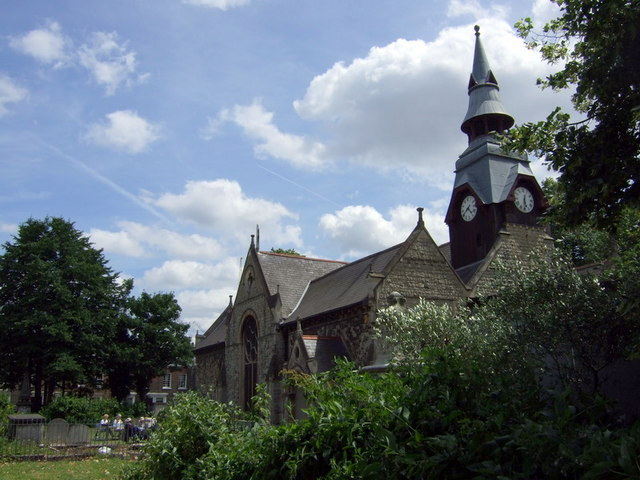
- St Matthias Old Church
- Location: Poplar High Street, Poplar, London
- Country: England
- Denomination: Church of England

Architecture
- Architect: Robert Shirley William Milford Teulon

St Matthias Old Church is the modern name given to the Poplar Chapel built by the East India Company in 1654, in Poplar, London. The church is designated a Grade II* listed building. Today the building is home to the St Matthias Community Centre, a charity that serves the local communities of Blackwall and Limehouse.

St Matthias Old Church is one of the very few extant churches built under the Commonwealth (others include those at Berwick-on-Tweed, Staunton Harold, Ninekirks and Brougham).

== History ==
In 1627 the East India Company (EIC) purchased a house in Poplar High Street to be used as a hospital for disabled seamen. In 1618 a corrupt jeweller, Hugh Greete, had been sent back from India for stealing stones. He died in prison in 1619, and directed that a school or hospital be founded from his estate. The Company had set up a shipyard in Blackwall in 1614, so neighbouring Poplar was the obvious choice for location. In 1633 the inhabitants of Poplar and Blackwall – largely employees of the EIC – requested that a chapel be built there as St Dunstan's, Stepney was too far away for them. When Gilbert Dethick, the Lord of the manor of Poplar, died in 1639 he left a further £100 towards the building of the chapel, on the condition that work started within three years of his death.

The beginning of the work coincided with the outbreak of the English Civil War. William Laud, the Archbishop of Canterbury was executed in 1645 after being prominently involved in debates about church architecture and internal décor. With a further bequest from Sir John Gayer, a director of the EIC, and money direct from the Company, work got properly underway in 1652. The first payment was made to John Tanner, Master of the Bricklayers' Company in 1654, who became the principal builder.

The burial ground was allotted to the chapel in 1657.

== Architecture ==
St Matthias is a brick building enhanced with stone quoins at the corners. It combines Classical and Gothic elements, similar to St Katherine Cree in the City of London, consecrated in 1631.

Internally, the barrel-vaulted roof is supported by eight Tuscan columns, seven of oak and one of stone. There is no evidence to support the story that they were made from ships' masts. This gives a Dutch flavour to the architecture reminiscent of Hendrick de Keyser who built several churches in Amsterdam in the early seventeenth century.

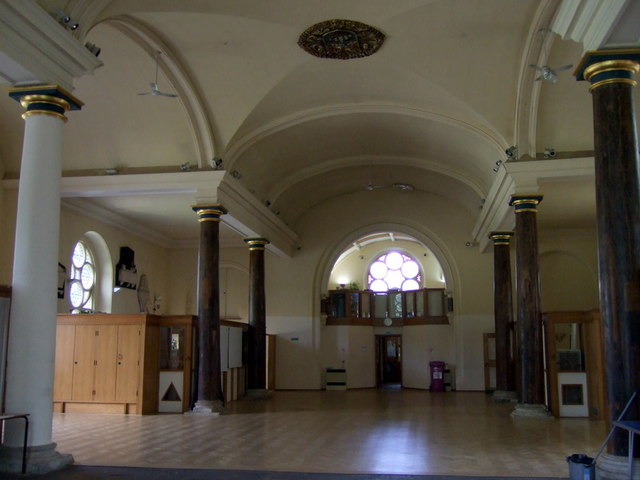
St Matthias Old Church, interior

During the eighteenth century various changes were made: a tower added (1718), a triple-decker pulpit (1733) and extensive repairs and alterations to the windows in 1775–1776 (architect: Richard Jupp). In the early 19th century a mural monument to George Steevens by John Flaxman was commissioned; this is currently on loan to the Fitzwilliam Museum, Cambridge.

== Usage ==
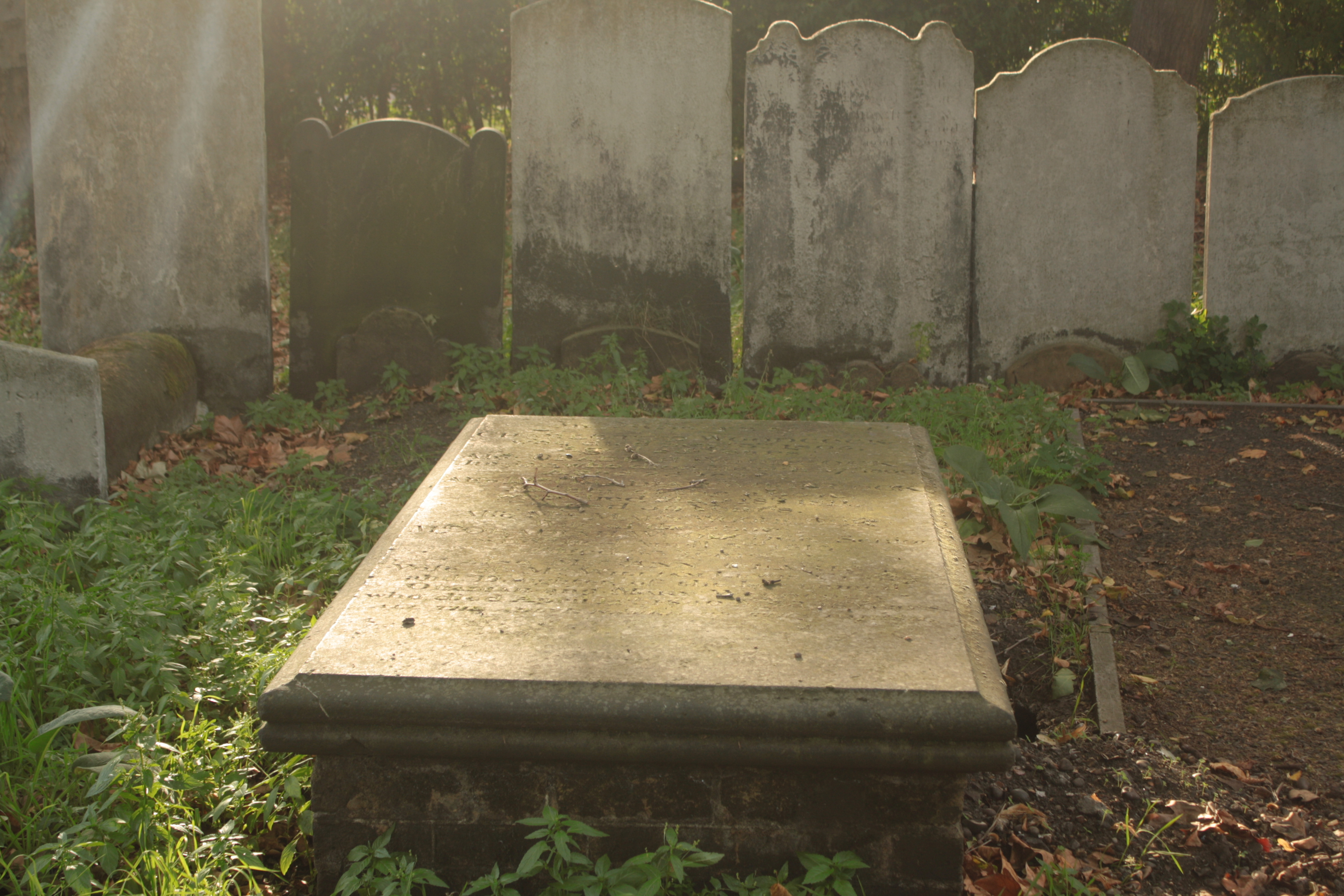
St Mattias Old Church Graveyard

For many years the Chapel was used for prayers before mariners and passengers departed on what might prove to be a dangerous voyage. Many early migrants to British North America would have participated in these services, before leaving for an uncertain future abroad. It was also the chapel of the adjacent almshouses, home to the Poplar Pensioners, seamen retired from the EIC. Officers had premises up by the East India Dock Road, whereas the other ranks were located on Poplar High Street. Between 1841 and 1844 eight Asiatic sailors were buried in the churchyard.

Following the Indian Rebellion of 1857, the EIC was wound up and Poplar Chapel became St Matthias, a Church of England parish church. Its first vicar was John Fenwick Kitto, appointed by Archibald Campbell Tait. William Milford Teulon carried out substantial changes from 1867 to 1876: a modern pulpit, font and organ were installed, the building was clad in Kentish ragstone and a chancel, vestry and organ chamber were installed. Stained glass windows incorporating masonic imagery were installed in 1920 by East London lodges as a memorial to their brethren who had died in the First World War. Poplar was heavily bombed during the Second World War, but St Matthias survived with only shards of shrapnel buried in some of the walls.

However, in the 1970s St Matthias merged with St Anne's, Limehouse; St Matthias was thriving but St Anne's, with much smaller congregations, was architecturally too prestigious to close. So the two churches joined, and the congregation of St Matthias moved to Limehouse. St Matthias' building was declared redundant in 1977 and deconsecrated. After several years of dereliction, English Heritage and the London Docklands Development Corporation (LDDC) agreed to major restoration in 1990, with the agreed use being as an "Arts Centre". As the LDDC did not have the funding to match English Heritage, LDDC decided that its contribution should be part of the necessary 'Planning Gain' required for the West India Quay 7-acre (28,000 m^{2}) site, which they were in the process of selling. The UK agents of the overseas purchaser, Cheval, refused to accept the 'Arts Centre' and demanded local involvement in determining future use as well as the establishment of a "sinking fund" to maintain St Matthias in perpetuity. In 1992 the St Matthias Conservation trust was set up to preserve the building and provide use as a community centre.

== Notable people buried at St Matthias ==
- Robert Ainsworth (1743)
- Mary East (1780)
- John Perry (1810)
- John Stock (1842)
- George Green (1849)
