= Charles Pritchard =

British astronomer (1808–1893)

- Born: 29 February 1808; Alberbury, Shropshire, England
- Died: 20 May 1893 (aged 85)
- Awards: Royal Medal (1892)
- Scientific career
- Fields: astronomy

Reverend Charles Pritchard (29 February 1808 – 28 May 1893) was a British astronomer, clergyman, and educational reformer. He founded the Clapham Grammar School in 1834 and included sciences in the curriculum. A chapel was erected in 1846.

== Biography ==
He was born at Alberbury, Shropshire, fourth son of William Pritchard, a failed manufacturer who later moved to London where he attended the Merchant Taylor's School and Poplar Academy where he was taught by John Stock, the progressive educationalist. Pritchard later described his studies as consisting of "a systematic course of instruction relating to physical phenomena". At sixteen he was enrolled as a sizar at St John's College, Cambridge, graduating in 1830 as fourth wrangler. In 1832 he was elected a fellow of his college, and in the following year he was ordained, and became head of a private school at Stockwell. From 1834 to 1862 he was headmaster of Clapham grammar school. He then retired to Freshwater, in the Isle of Wight, and took an active interest in the affairs of the Royal Astronomical Society, of which he became honorary secretary in 1862 and president in 1866. His sister, Margaret died this same year.

His career as a professional astronomer began in 1870, when he was elected Savilian professor of astronomy at the University of Oxford. At his request the university decided to build a fine equatorial telescope for the instruction of his class and for purposes of research, a scheme which, as a result of Warren de la Rue's munificent gift of instruments from his private observatory at Cranford, expanded into the establishment of the new university observatory. By De la Rue's advice, Pritchard began his career there with a determination of the physical libration of the moon, or the nutation of its axis.

In 1882 Pritchard commenced a systematic study of stellar photometry. For this purpose he employed an instrument known as the "wedge photometer", with which he measured the relative brightness of 2,784 stars between the North Pole and about -10° declination. The results were published in 1885 in his Uranometria Nova Oxoniensis, and their importance was recognized by the bestowal in 1886 upon him, conjointly with Professor Pickering, of the Gold Medal of the Royal Astronomical Society.

He then decided to experiment with applying photography to the determination of stellar parallax. With the object of testing the capabilities of the method, he took for his first essay the well-known star 61 Cygni, and his results agreed so well with those previously attained that he undertook the systematic measurement of the parallaxes of second-magnitude stars, and published the outcome in the third and fourth volumes of the Publications of the Oxford University Observatory. Although some lurking errors impaired the authority of the concluded parallaxes this work ranks as a valuable contribution to astronomy, since it showed the possibility of employing photography in such delicate investigations.

When an international survey of the heavens was proposed, the zone between 25° and 31° north declination was allotted to him, and at the time of his death some progress had been made in recording its included stars. Pritchard became a fellow of New College, Oxford, in 1883, and an honorary fellow of St John's College, Cambridge, in 1886. He was elected a fellow of the Royal Society in 1840, and in 1892 was awarded one of the royal medals for his work on photometry and stellar parallax.

== Family ==
A son, Sir Charles Bradley Pritchard, was an administrator in British India.

== Works ==
- C. Pritchard (1866). The Continuity of the Schemes of Nature and Revelation: A Sermon Preached, by request, on the occasion of the meeting of the British Association at Nottingham. With remarks on some relations of modern knowledge to theology. London: Bell and Daldy.
- Occasional thoughts of an astronomer on nature and revelation (1889)
- Modern science and natural religion (1874)
