= Saint Nicholas School, Essex =

Saint Nicholas School

Location
- Hillingdon House; Hobbs Cross Road; Old Harlow, Essex, CM17 0NJ; England; 51°46′46″N 0°09′03″E

Information
- Type: Independent day school
- Established: 1939
- Local authority: Essex
- Department for Education URN: 115417 Tables
- Ofsted: Reports
- Chair of Governors: Rob Ellice
- Headmaster: Terence Ayres
- Staff: 90
- Gender: Mixed
- Age: 3 to 16
- Enrolment: 500
- Colours: Dark Blue, Red and Gold
- Website: http://www.saintnicholasschool.net/

Saint Nicholas School is a co-educational independent day school in Old Harlow, Essex for children aged 2 1/2 to 16 years old. The current Headmaster is Mr Terence Ayres.

== History ==
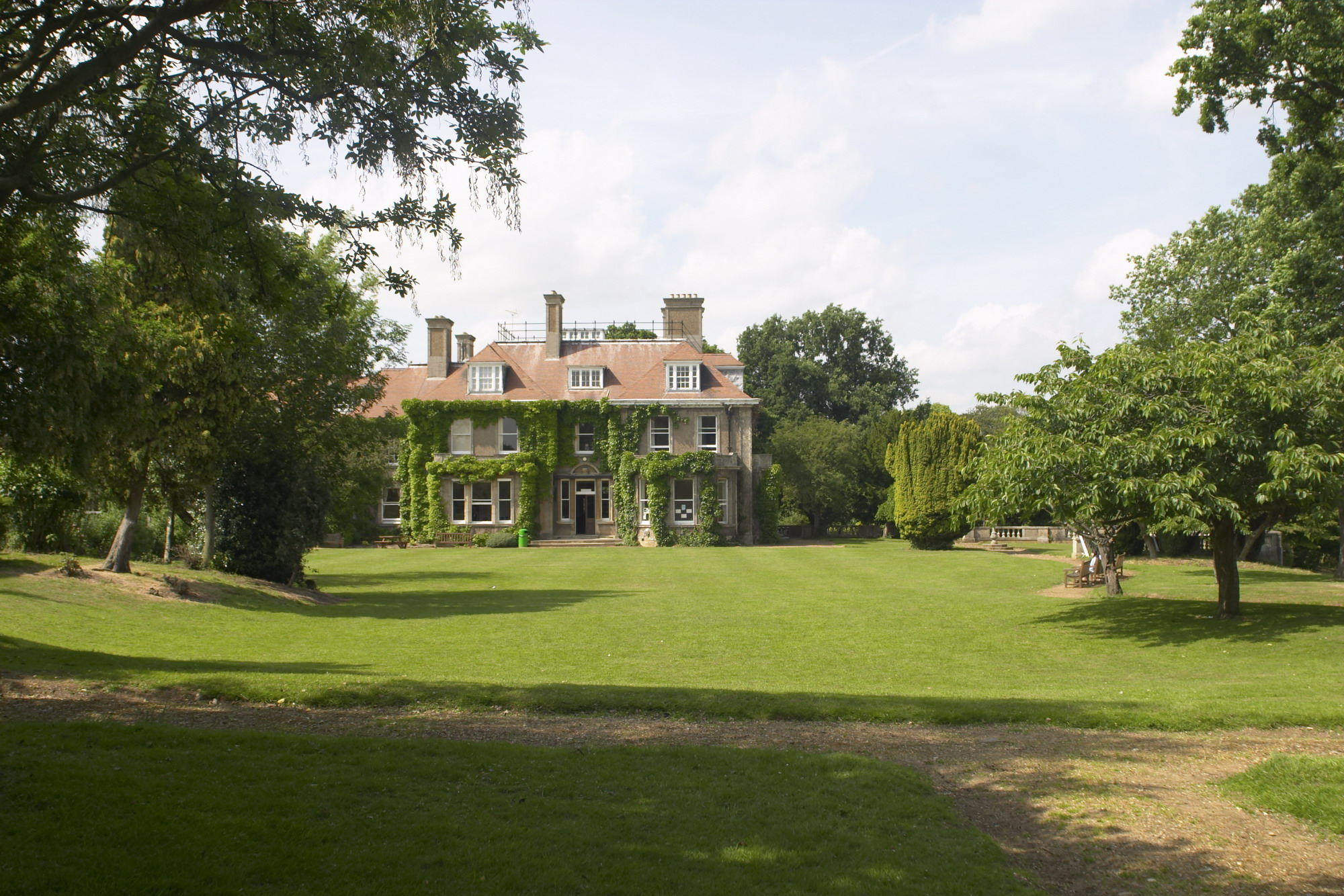

Saint Nicholas School was established in 1939 in the hamlet of Churchgate Street, near Old Harlow. The school moved premises to its current site in nearby Hillingdon House, Old Harlow in 1977. It currently educates 500 boys and girls aged 3 to 16.

The school site including gardens and grounds, extends to over 14 acres (57,000 m^{2}). Lower, middle and upper schools are each housed in their own area, within close proximity of each other, enabling access to shared facilities. The school is equipped with specialist classrooms, science laboratories, technology areas, ICT rooms, two libraries and a theatre. Sports facilities include extensive playing fields, tennis courts, a heated swimming pool and a sports hall.

Saint Nicholas School is a registered charity, managed by the Board of Governors and the Headmaster, Mr Terence Ayres.

In September 2014, the school opened a pre-school for children aged 2 1/2 to 4 years old called the Little Saints Pre-School.
