= John Perry (shipbuilder) =

Late ship-company founder

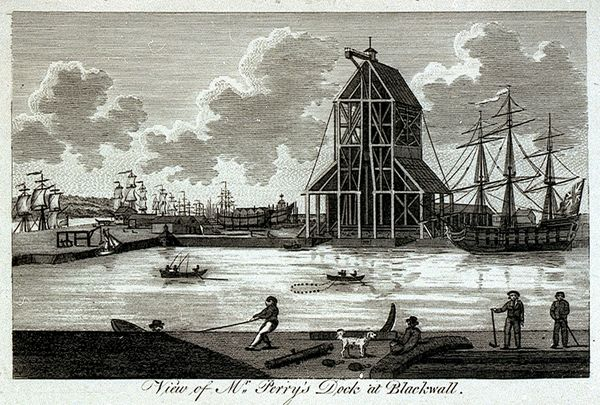
View of Mr. Perry's Dock at Blackwall, circa 1789

John Perry (4 January 1743 – 7 November 1810), son of John Perry Snr (13 December 1712 - 20 January 1771) and Ann Watlington (1716 - 1752), was the founder of the Blackwall Yard, where he built ships largely for the East India Company.

John Perry's maternal grandfather was Samuel Watlington a wealthy Cloth merchant and former Mayor of Reading who built Watlington House reputed to be the oldest surviving secular building in the town.

John Perry married his first cousin, Elizabeth Brown (3 Jul 1745 - 25 Jan 1795), daughter of John Brown and Elizabeth Perry, at St Dunstan's, Stepney on 19 Mar 1765. His first wife, Elizabeth Perry, was buried at St Matthias Old Church on 2 Feb 1795.

John Perry had a total of 15 children with his two wives: nine with Elizabeth and six with Mary.

John and Elizabeth Perry's eldest daughter, Elizabeth Perry, married William Layman in 1798. Captain William Layman was a protégé of Lord Nelson, with whom he served in three ships.

John Perry's second daughter, Sarah, married George Green, in 1796, whom Perry had taken as apprentice a dozen years previously.

In 1798 Perry married Green's sister Mary. He retired to Moor Hall, near Harlow and was appointed High Sheriff of Essex.

Perry's children by his two marriages included:

- John and Philip, who followed him into the family business
- Charles, first bishop of Melbourne, Australia
- Thomas, father of John Perry-Watlington, MP for South Essex
- Amelia (died 1874), managing committee for George Green's School

John Perry died on 7 Nov 1810 in Battersea, at his house there, Terrace House (now Old Battersea House, 30 Vicarage Crescent, Battersea, London, SW11) and was buried on 15 Nov 1810 at St Matthias Old Church, Poplar.

Ephraim Seehl, an apothecary and chemist, was married to his aunt Sarah.
