= Poplar Baths =

Former public bath house in Poplar, London

Coordinates: 51.5109°N 0.0141°W

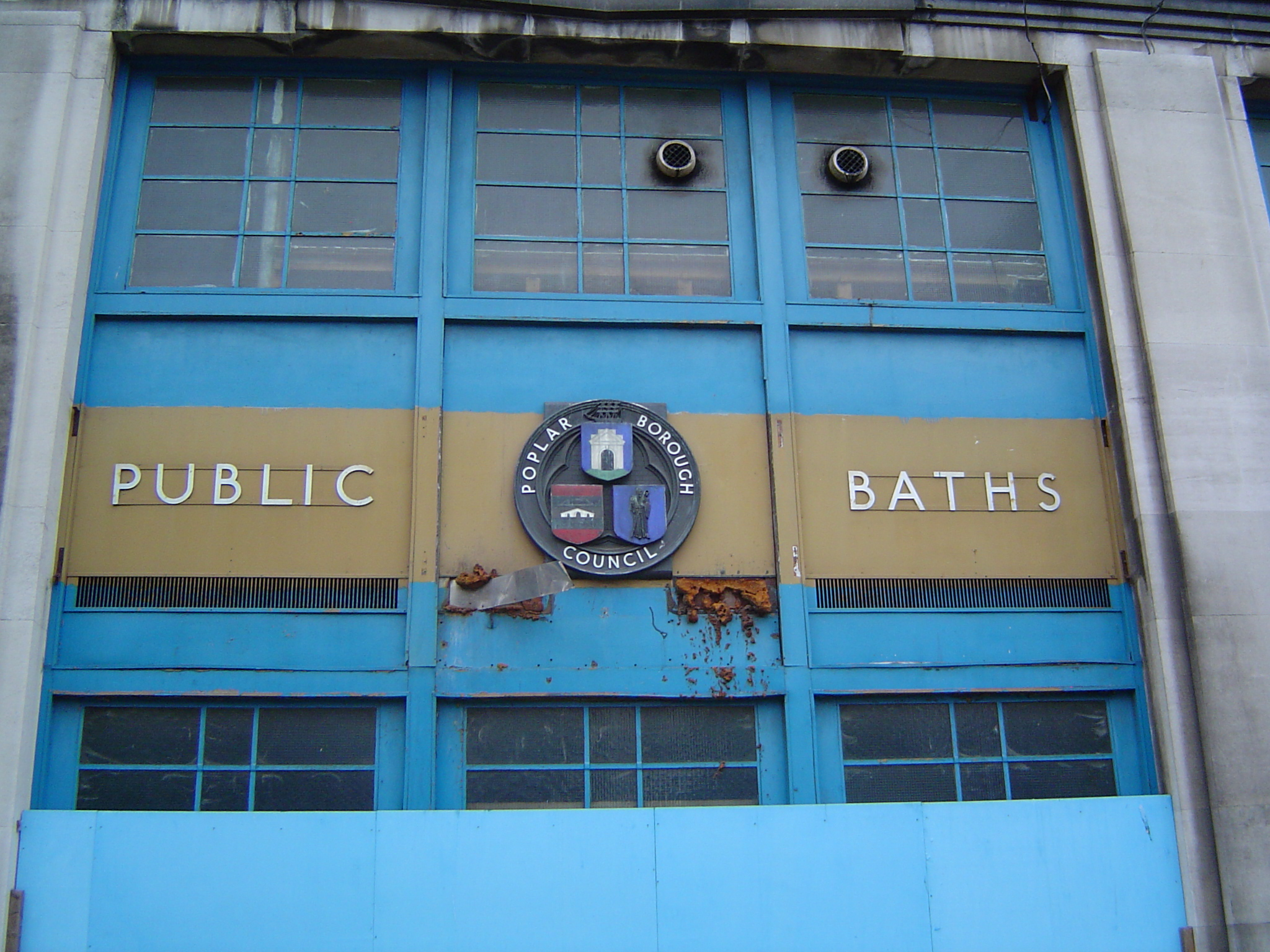
Poplar Baths

Poplar Baths on the East India Dock Road in Poplar, London is a former public bath house and Grade II listed building that was constructed in 1933 and closed to the public in 1988. The Baths are adjacent to All Saints DLR station. A campaign to restore the baths won the support of Tower Hamlets Council in 2010 and the construction company Guildmore was appointed to complete the works to create a new leisure centre incorporating a swimming pool, gymnasium and affordable housing on adjacent land. The site reopened in July 2016.

== History ==
The original Poplar Baths opened in 1852, costing £10,000. It was built to provide public wash facilities for Poplar poor as a result of the Baths and Washhouses Act 1846. The baths incorporated slipper and vapour baths. The slipper baths section contained 12 baths in the men's first-class division, 24 in the men's second-class and six in both women's divisions. Steam and shower baths were located behind the slipper baths. A comprehensive public laundry was located at the rear of the building, on Arthur Street. It contained 48 wooden washing tubs, drying equipment and ironing rooms. An uncovered water tank supplied the baths and was erected above the boiler house with a capacity of 24,000 gallons.

The Baths were rebuilt in 1933 to a design by Harley Heckford and the larger pool was covered over to convert the building into a theatre. Designated the East India Hall, it had seating capacity for 1,400 people and incorporated a dance hall, cinema, exhibition room and sports hall for boxing and wrestling programmes. This dual purpose sustained interest over the winter months, with the smaller pool remaining in use.

Between 1938 and 1941 an office in the Baths was used by Poplar Borough Council electricity office and then later used by the Transport and General Workers' Union and the Poplar Labour Party. The main bath hall sustained bomb damage during the Second World War and was forced to close with the hall left unglazed for several years.

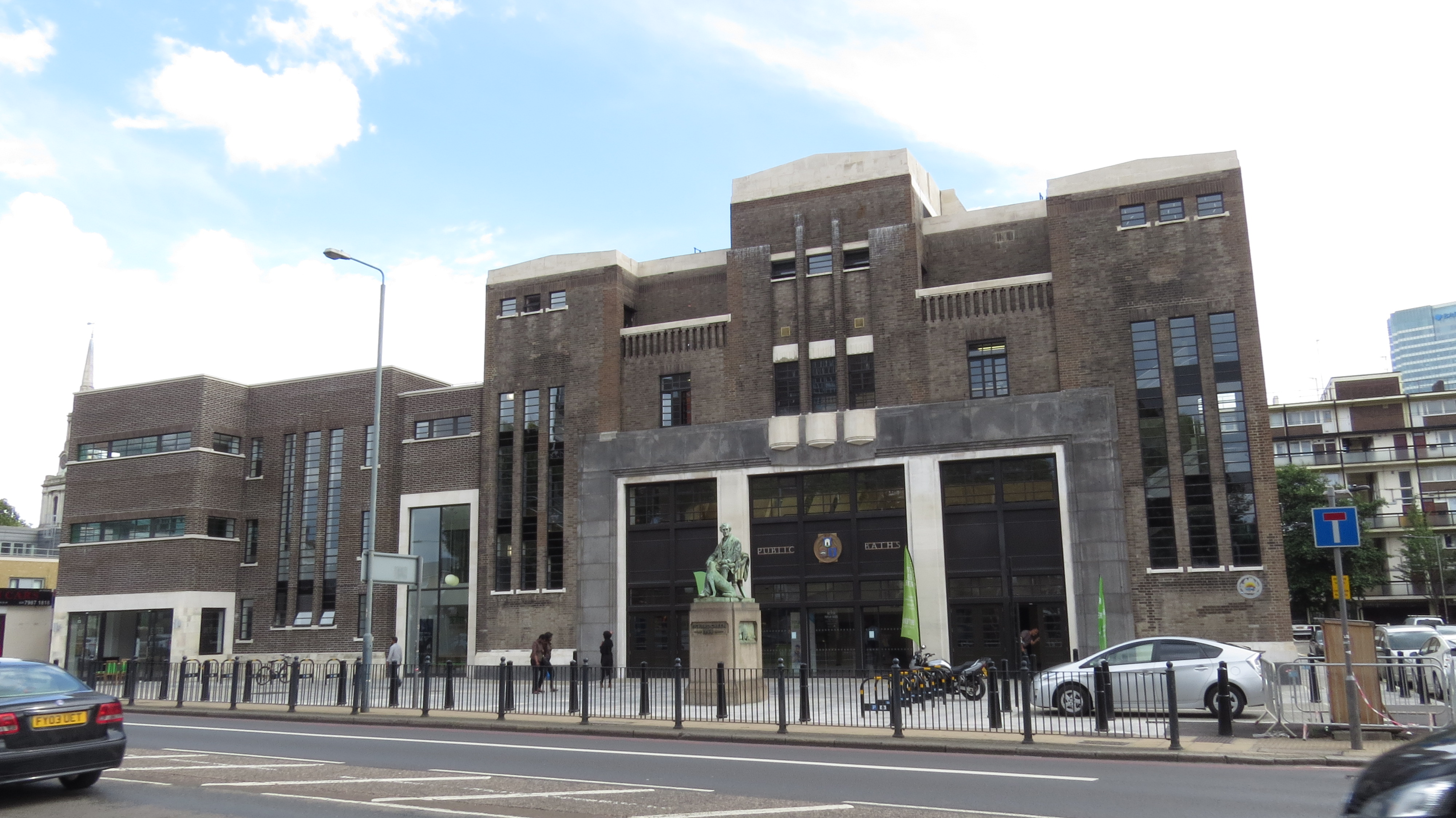
Poplar Baths, East London reopened in 2016

Poplar Baths reopened in 1947 and continued to be used as a swimming facility, attracting on average 225,700 bathers every year between 1954 and 1959, before the facility's eventual closure and conversion to an industrial training centre in 1988.

== Restoration ==
The Baths eventually became derelict and a bid to reopen the baths was put together by The Environment Trust, Swan Housing Group and the 'Poplar Baths Steering Group' receiving strong local support.

It has been a listed building (Grade II) since 2001 and was listed on the English Heritage Register of 'Heritage at Risk'. A statue of the local shipowner and philanthropist, Richard Green stands outside the Baths on the A13 East India Dock Road.

In 2010, the East London Advertiser confirmed that campaigners had won the battle to get it back into use.

Redevelopment of the Baths began in January 2014 and works were expected to complete by the end of 2015. The construction of the leisure centre and 100 new homes cost an estimated £36 million.

The Baths re-opened on 25 July 2016 and were removed from the Buildings at Risk register.
