= St Mary & St Hugh, Old Harlow =

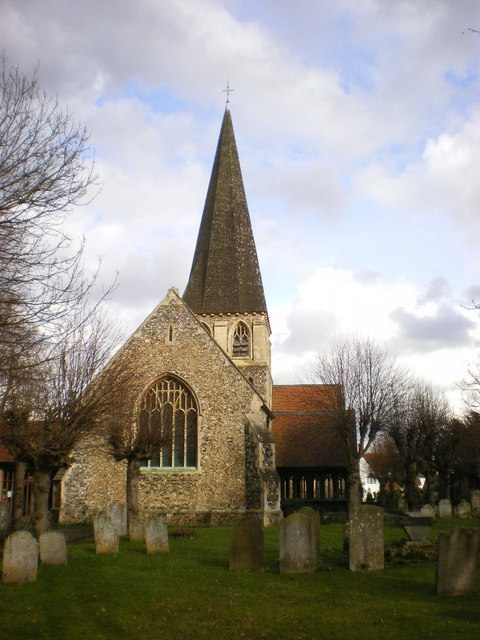
- St Mary's & St Hugh's Church
- St Mary & St Hugh, Old Harlow
- 51.78229°N 0.14809°E
- Denomination: Church of England
- Website: St Mary's Church

History
- Dedication: Saint Mary and Saint Hugh

Architecture
- Functional status: Parish church
- Heritage designation: Grade II
- Designated: 05 July 1950
- Architectural type: Church

Administration
- Province: Canterbury
- Diocese: Chelmsford
- Archdeaconry: Harlow
- Deanery: Harlow
- Parish: Harlow

Clergy
- Vicar: Rev'd Sarah Swift

St Mary & St Hugh's Church is a Church of England parish church in Churchgate Street, Old Harlow in Essex, England.

The church is of medieval origin and was given Grade II listed status on 5 July 1950. The church has a cruciform plan with a tower at the crossing with a tall shingled broach spire. It was completely restored by architect Henry Woodyer, 1878–80.
