= George Green's School =

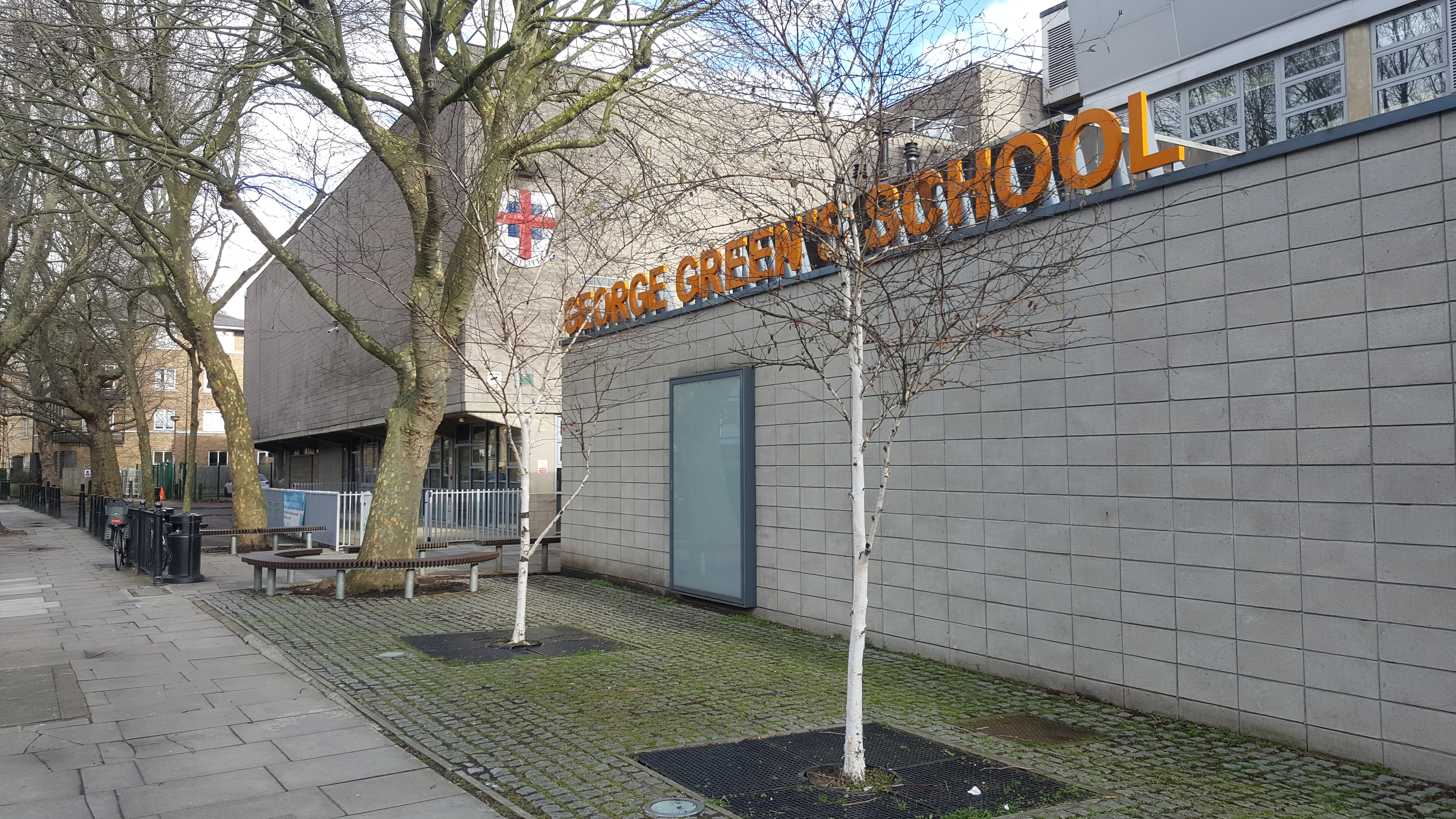
- Main entrance to George Green's School in Manchester Road

Location
- 100 Manchester Road; Isle of Dogs, London, E14 3DW; England
- Coordinates: 51.48786°N 0.00787°W

Information
- Type: Voluntary controlled comprehensive school
- Mottoes: Latin: Fideleter (Faithfully); Aspiration, Equality, Excellence
- Established: 1828; 198 years ago
- Founder: George Green
- Local authority: Tower Hamlets
- Department for Education URN: 100974 Tables
- Ofsted: Reports
- Principal: Jon Ryder
- Gender: Coeducational
- Age: 11 to 19
- Enrolment: 1219 (Ofsted report 2022)
- Website: www.georgegreens.com

George Green's School is a coeducational secondary school and sixth form, located in Cubitt Town on the Isle of Dogs in the London Borough of Tower Hamlets, England.

== History ==
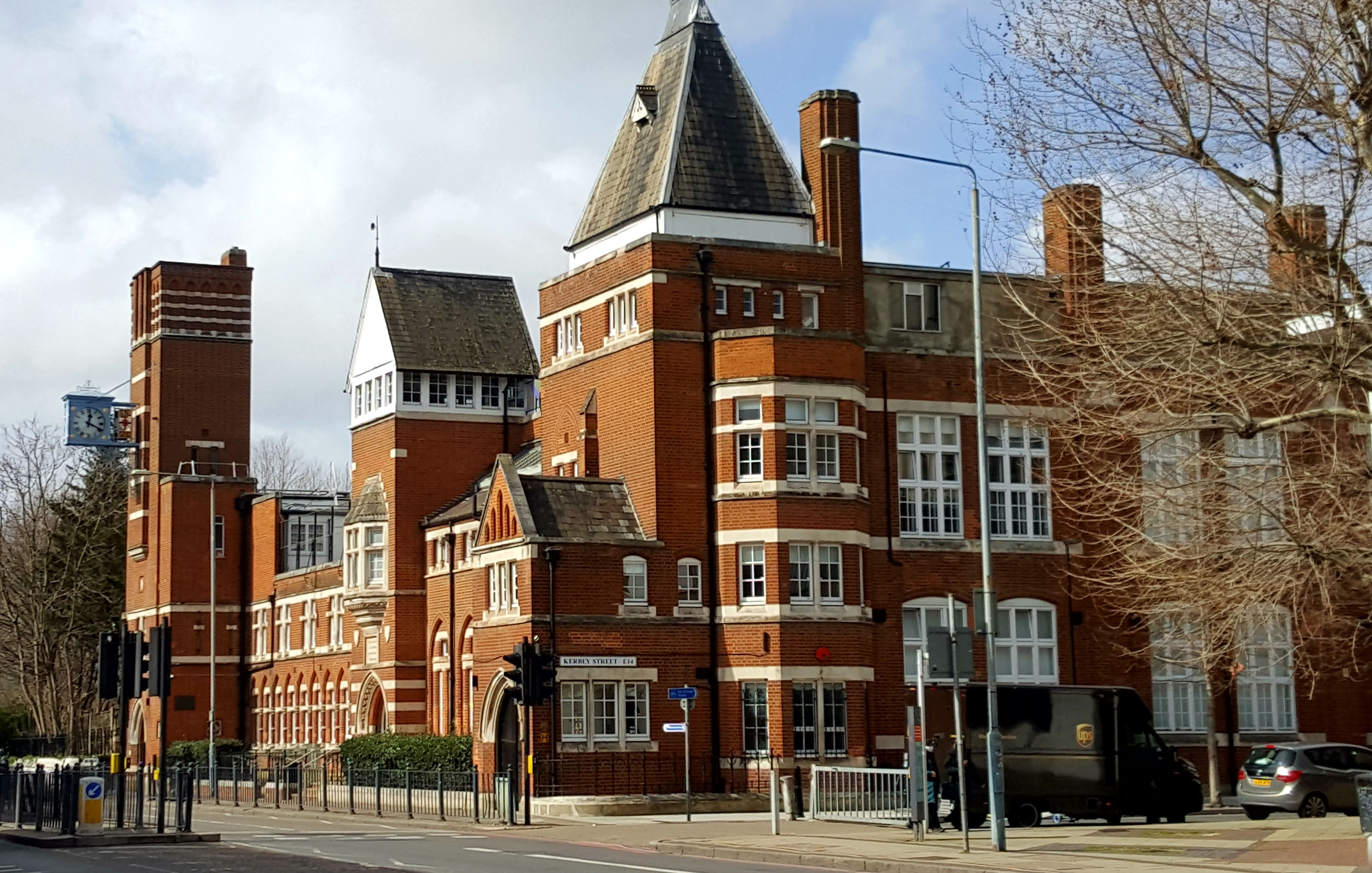
Former premises of George Green's Grammar School, located in Poplar.

The school, which was originally located on East India Dock Road, was founded in 1828 by George Green, a shipbuilder and shipwright. A maritime connection with the school has been maintained since then. In 1884, the school moved from the original buildings to new premises which provided places for 200 boys and 200 girls, in separate classrooms. The pupils paid modest fees or were assisted with scholarships. Later it became a LCC maintained school and was the first to institute co-education. It remained open until 1979 when it became part of Tower Hamlets College. Today it is a voluntary controlled school supported by the Worshipful Company of Shipwrights. It has a comprehensive intake of pupils, and is administered by Tower Hamlets London Borough Council.

=== Grammar school ===
It was a voluntary-controlled coeducational grammar school located on East India Dock Road Poplar.

=== Comprehensive ===
In 1975 it became a comprehensive, moving to a new site on the Isle of Dogs.

== Admissions ==
George Green's School offers GCSEs and vocational courses as programmes of study for pupils, while students in the sixth form have the option to study from a range of A Levels and the IB Diploma Programme.

== Notable former pupils ==
=== George Green's Grammar School ===
- Prof Roderic Alfred Gregory CBE FRS, George Holt Professor of Physiology from 1948 to 1981 at the University of Liverpool, who studied gastrin
- Prof Kenneth Harrap CBE, Professor of Biochemical Pharmacology from 1984 to 1997
- Sam Lesser, Daily Worker/Morning Star journalist, veteran of the International Brigades during the Spanish Civil War.
- John Scurr, Labour MP

=== George Green's Comprehensive ===
- Jane Martinson, journalist on The Guardian
