= Old Harlow =

Historic area of Harlow, England

Coordinates: 51.78273°N 0.13688°E

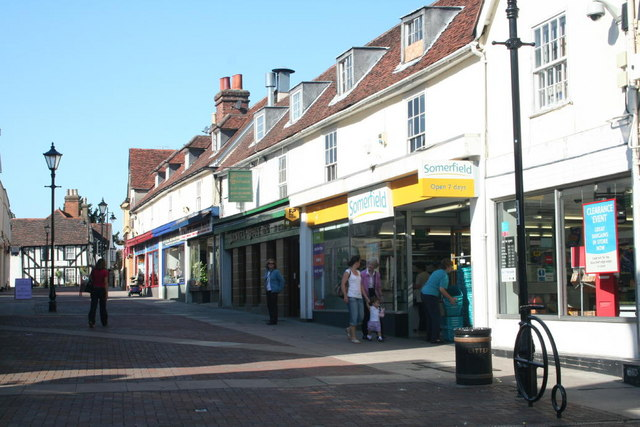
- High Street, Old Harlow

- Location within Essex
- Population: 5,845
- OS grid reference: TL475115
- District: Harlow
- Shire county: Essex
- Region: East
- Country: England
- Sovereign state: United Kingdom
- Post town: HARLOW
- Postcode district: CM17
- Dialling code: 01279
- Police: Essex
- Fire: Essex
- Ambulance: East of England
- UK Parliament: Harlow

Old Harlow is the old town area of Harlow, in Essex, England. It was the historical town centre prior to Harlow being designated a new town in 1947 during the new towns in the United Kingdom movement.

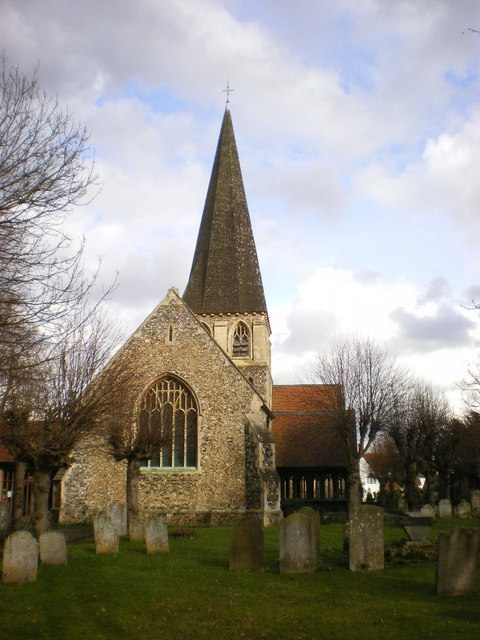
St Mary & St Hugh, Churchgate Street

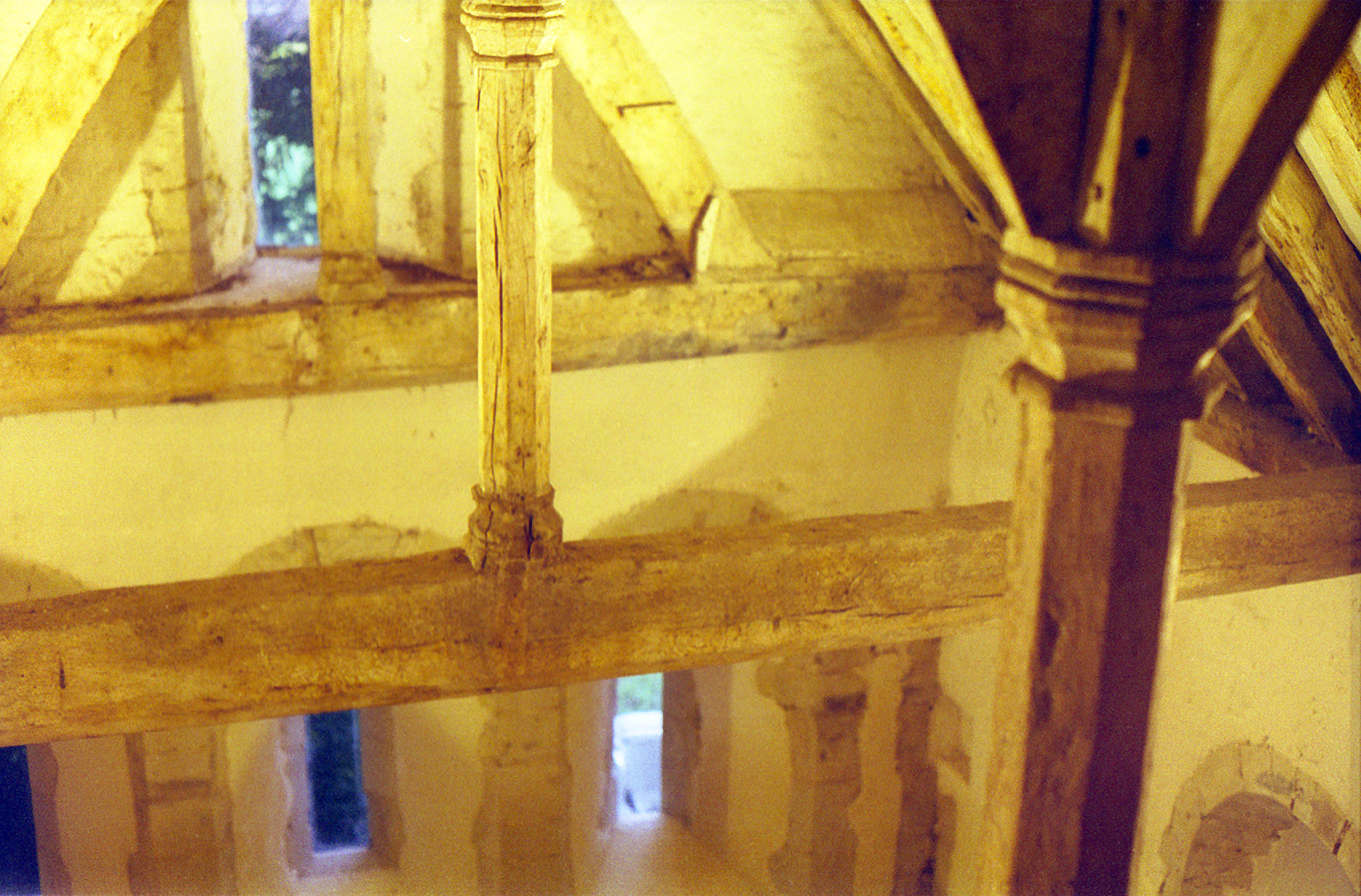
12th-century beams in Harlowbury Chapel

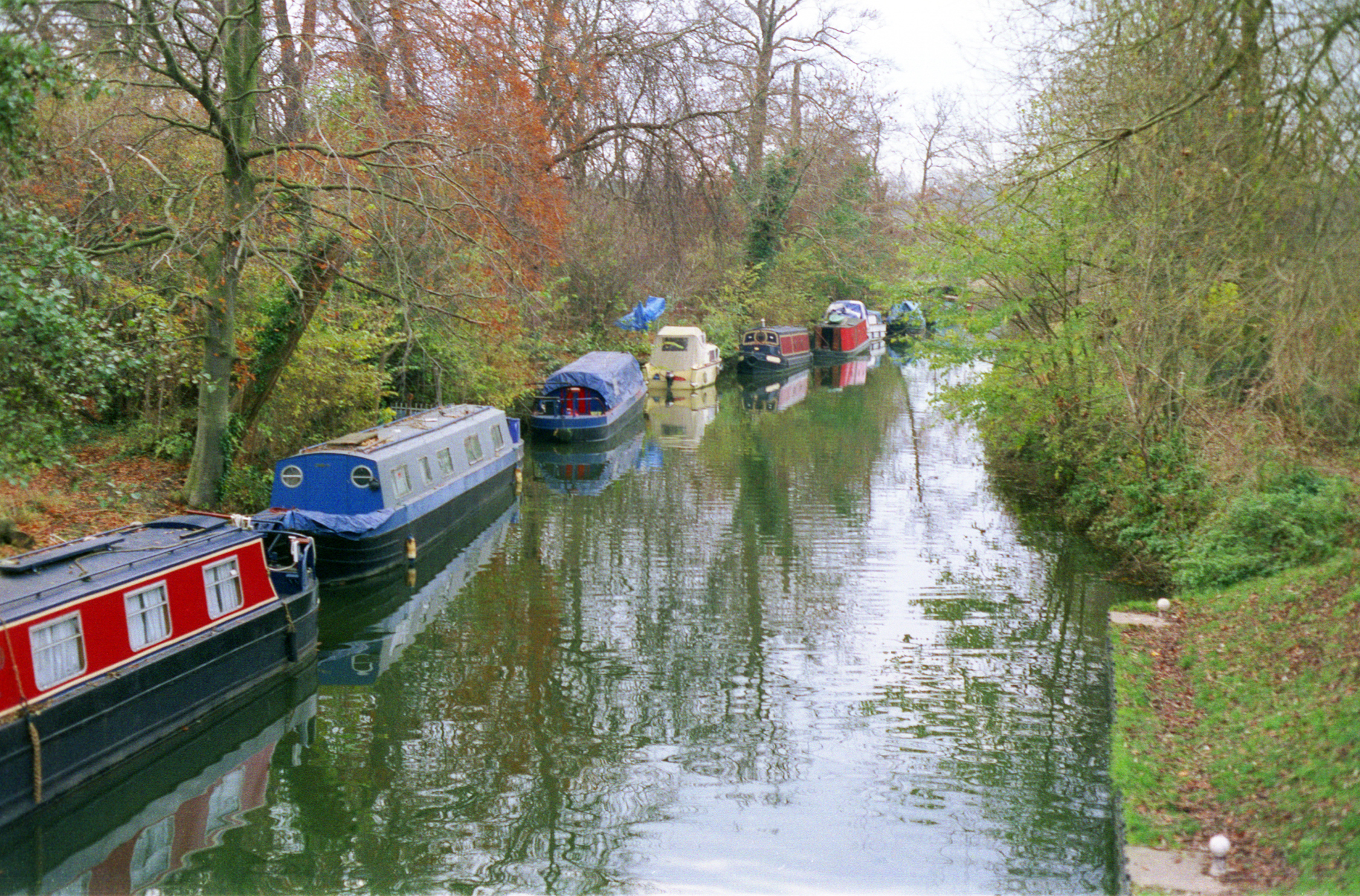
Narrowboats moored on the Stort Navigation

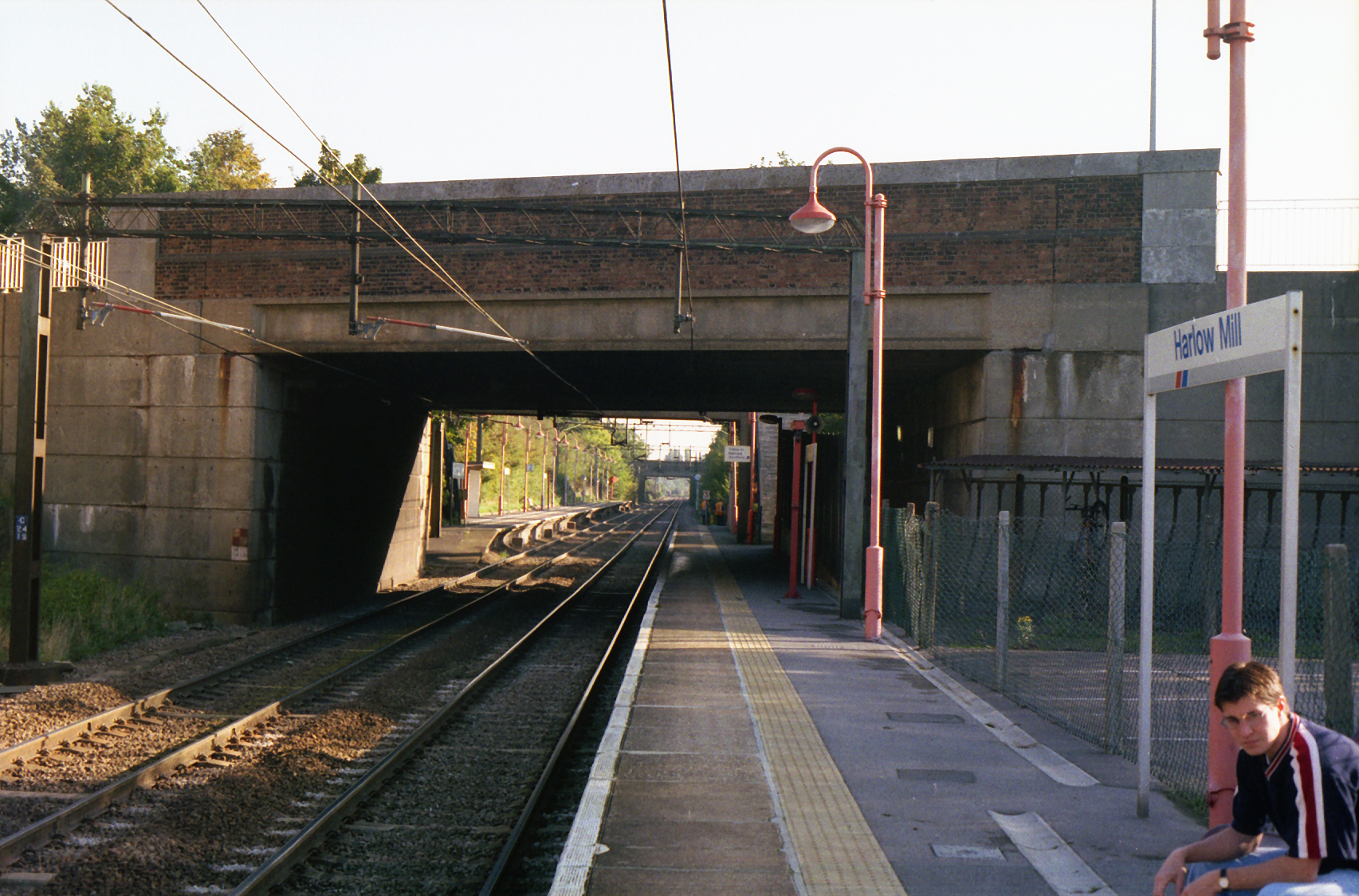
Harlow Mill railway station

Old Harlow is situated in the north-east area of the town and is the oldest area of the town. Old Harlow pre-dates the first written record in the Domesday Book of 1086, so it is unknown when the town first came into existence. Originally Old Harlow was going to be the central area of Harlow New Town, but due to the amount of demolition works and the loss of agricultural land it was decided to build Harlow New Town to the west of Old Harlow. As the new town was being built, Old Harlow seemed to be forgotten and fell behind in its development. It was not until 1977 that Old Harlow was improved with the building of a health service and a senior citizens day centre. Old Harlow still remains village-like with two Grade I listed buildings and many Grade II listed buildings.

Old Harlow ward has a total population of 5,845 and comprises 2,498 homes.

== History ==
The entry in the Norman Domesday Book reads: Herlaua: St Edmunds Abbey before and after 1066; Geoffrey from Count Eustace; Thorgils from Eudo the Steward; Richard from Ranulf, brother of Ilger. Mill, 7 beehives, 8 cobs, 43 cattle, 3 foals. The watermill is now a 300-year-old listed building and restaurant.

Old Harlow was known as Harlow before the building of Harlow New Town; it was renamed Old Harlow and became a ward of Harlow District Council. It is now known to be an affluent area and it attracts a premium with its cottages and period houses. The High Street has various shops, cafés and restaurants. Opposite the High Street runs Fore Street and Market Street, where there are three of the Old Town pubs, the Chequers, the Marquis of Granby and the Crown. At the other end of High Street is the Green Man Hotel.

The town is served by St Mary & St Hugh, Old Harlow and by Harlow Baptist Church.

Old Harlow has contained a small extension campus of Memorial University of Newfoundland, Canada, since 1969; the university will close its Essex campus at the end of August 2026.

=== Historic estates ===
==== Harlowbury ====
The former manor of Harlowbury lies immediately to the north-east of the town. It was for a time a seat of the Addington family. A Norman chapel survives on the site; it is Grade I listed and is a scheduled ancient monument.

== Transport ==
=== Bus ===
Most bus services operate to nearby Harlow, with some buses also linking to other major towns such as Bishop's Stortford and Chelmsford. Some routes are operated under contract to Essex County Council (route 59 and HSB1), but most routes are operated commercially (routes 8, 10, 508, 509, 510). Routes 508, 509, 510 is the most frequent service, offering links to Harlow, Sawbridgeworth, Bishop's Stortford and Stansted Airport 24-hours a day, including Christmas Day. This is served by Arriva Herts & Essex for all routes apart from HSB1.

=== Rail ===
Harlow Mill railway station, which is located in Old Harlow, is served by the West Anglia Main Line and is operated by Greater Anglia to such destinations such as Audley End, London Liverpool Street and Stratford. There is also a connection between the two main Harlow stations but it is not frequent.

== Pubs ==
- The Chequers
- The Crown
- The Green Man
- The Marquis of Granby
- The Queen's Head Inn
- The White Horse

== Schools ==
- Fawbert and Barnard's School
- Harlowbury Academy
- Mark Hall Academy
- Saint Nicholas School
- Memorial University of Newfoundland – Harlow Campus
