= George Green (shipbuilder) =

English shipbuilder (1767–1849)

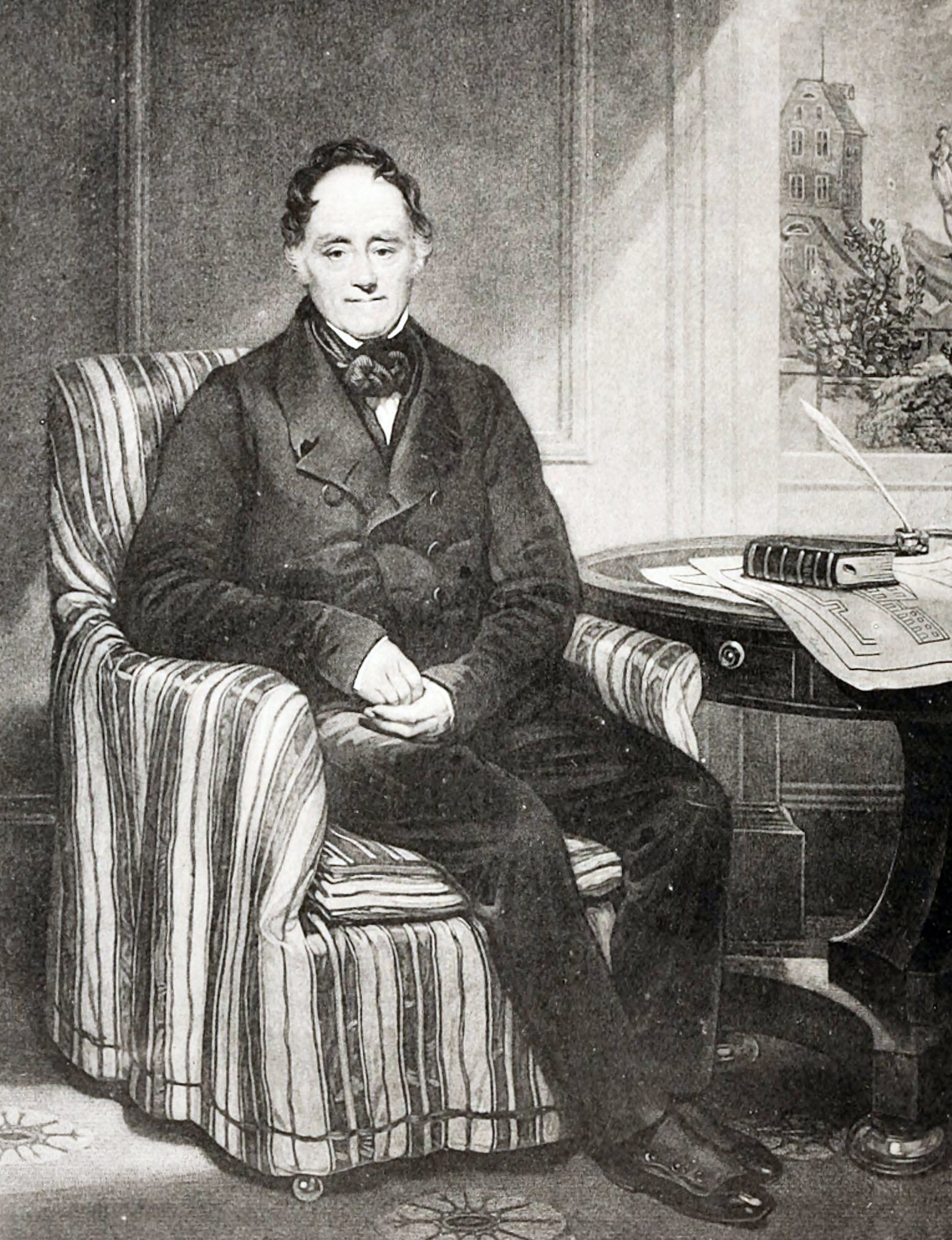
George Green

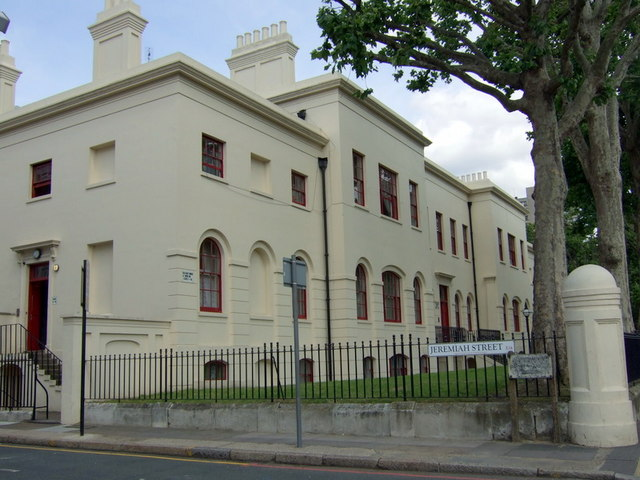
The Sailors' Home (133 East India Dock Road)

George Green (1767 – 21 February 1849) was a ship builder from Blackwall, London.

== Biography ==
Green served his shipbuilding apprenticeship with John Perry on the largest dock on the River Thames at the Blackwall Yard, repairing and building ships primarily for the East India Company.

As Perry began to withdraw from the business the firm became Perry Sons & Green (having married John Perry's second daughter in 1796), Perry Wells & Green (a half share having been sold to Rotherhithe shipbuilder John Wells) and eventually Wigram & Green. In 1821 the firm built its first steamship. During this period the yard built Blackwall Frigates.

He married Sarah Perry in 1796 giving birth to Richard Green in 1803. Following Sarah's death in 1805, George Green remarried Elizabeth Unwin giving birth to Frederick Green and Henry Green. Frederick went on to set up Frederick Green and Co., and was the father of Joseph Green and Sir Frederick Green.

Green died in 1849 and was buried in Trinity Congregational Chapel, in Tower Hamlets, London. All the remaining monuments in the old Trinity churchyard were removed, except for the table tomb of George Green, which can be found in Trinity Gardens today.

== Legacy and philanthropy ==
After George retired in 1838, Richard took over with step-brother Henry to form R & H Green's until 1907. In that time they contributed to the Crimean War building 25 naval vessels. In 1910 the company amalgamated with Silley Weir & Company, as R.& H. Green and Silley Weir Ltd, which constructed and repaired munitions ships, minesweepers, hospital ships and destroyers during the First World War.

- George Green's School endowed in 1828
- Trinity Independent Chapel and its associated "minister's house, sailors' home, schools, and almshouses", according to the Survey of London.
- The Sailors' Home (133 East India Dock Road) and opened in 1841, providing 200 beds caring for the crews of his ships in between their voyages, protecting them from the Crimping System. Unusually for its time, the Sailors' Home was racially integrated (see Lascar).
