= Grade I and II* listed buildings in the London Borough of Tower Hamlets =

There are over 9,000 Grade I listed buildings and 20,000 Grade II* listed buildings in England. This page is a list of these buildings in the London Borough of Tower Hamlets.

== Grade I ==
Name	Location	Type	Completed (Note: The date given is the date used by Historic England as significant for the initial building or that of an important part in the structure's description.)	Date designated	Grid ref. (Note: The grid reference is based on the British national grid reference system, sometimes known as OSGB36, used by the Ordnance Survey.) Geo-coordinates	Entry number (Note: The "List Entry Number" is a unique number assigned to each listed building and scheduled monument by Historic England.)	Image
Tobacco Dock, including vaults extending under Wapping Lane	Pennington St, London El	Tobacco Warehouse	1811–13	29 December 1950	TQ3470080589; 51°30′29″N 0°03′38″W	1065827	Tobacco Dock, including vaults extending under Wapping Lane More images
Blackwall Basin	Tower Hamlets	Dock Basin	1800–02	1 July 1983	TQ3813080156; 51°30′12″N 0°00′40″W	1242449	Blackwall Basin More images
Chapel of St Peter Ad Vincula	Tower of London, Tower Hamlets	Parish Church	1519–20	30 November 1989	TQ3356080598; 51°30′31″N 0°04′37″W	1357540	Chapel of St Peter Ad Vincula More images
Christ Church (including Gatepiers and Gates to Vergers Yard)	Tower Hamlets	Church	1714–1729	29 December 1950	TQ3374881780; 51°31′09″N 0°04′25″W	1357795	Christ Church (including Gatepiers and Gates to Vergers Yard) More images
Church of St Anne	Limehouse, Tower Hamlets	Church	1712–30	29 December 1950	TQ3678181033; 51°30′42″N 0°01′49″W	1357808	Church of St Anne More images
Church of St George in the East	Tower Hamlets	Church	1729	29 December 1950	TQ3474580797; 51°30′36″N 0°03′35″W	1357779	Church of St George in the East More images
Church of St John on Bethnal Green	Bethnal Green, Tower Hamlets	Church	1824–25	18 July 1949	TQ3502782758; 51°31′39″N 0°03′18″W	1065245	Church of St John on Bethnal Green More images
St Peter's, London Docks	Wapping Lane, London, E1W 2RW	Anglican Church	1865–1866	29 September 1973	TQ3486580368; 51°30′22″N 0°03′29″W	1065844	St Peter's, London Docks More images
Tower of London, Middle Tower, with causeway to Byward Tower and remains of causeway to Lion Tower	Tower of London, Tower Hamlets	Tower	1275–81	30 November 1989	TQ3345280532; 51°30′29″N 0°04′42″W	1065766	Tower of London, Middle Tower, with causeway to Byward Tower and remains of causeway to Lion Tower More images
Tower of London White Tower	Tower of London, Tower Hamlets	Keep	c1078-1100	30 November 1989	TQ3361780548; 51°30′29″N 0°04′34″W	1260258	Tower of London White Tower More images
Tower of London Inner curtain wall with mural towers, the New Armouries and the Queen's House	Tower of London, Tower Hamlets	House	1989	30 November 1989	TQ3353880586; 51°30′30″N 0°04′38″W	1242062	Tower of London Inner curtain wall with mural towers, the New Armouries and the Queen's House More images
Tower of London Outer curtain wall with casements and mural towers	Tower of London, Tower Hamlets	Moat	Late 13th century or early 14th century	30 November 1989	TQ3358880649; 51°30′32″N 0°04′35″W	1242026	Tower of London Outer curtain wall with casements and mural towers More images
Mercantile Marine First World War Memorial	Tower Hill	War memorial	1928	27 September 1973	TQ3350180710; 51°30′35″N 0°04′41″W	1260087	Mercantile Marine First World War Memorial More images
Parish Church of St Dunstan and All Saints (the Church of the High Seas)	Stepney, Tower Hamlets	Church	10th century	29 December 1950	TQ3597681586; 51°31′01″N 0°02′30″W	1065065	Parish Church of St Dunstan and All Saints (the Church of the High Seas) More images
Portion of Old London Wall	Tower Hamlets	Town Wall	Roman	29 December 1950	TQ3361380754; 51°30′36″N 0°04′34″W	1357518	Portion of Old London Wall More images
Quay walls, copings and buttresses to Import Dock and Export Dock, West India Docks	Isle of Dogs, Tower Hamlets	Dock	1800-2	1 July 1983	TQ3757380490; 51°30′24″N 0°01′09″W	1065783	Quay walls, copings and buttresses to Import Dock and Export Dock, West India Docks More images
Warehouses and general offices at western end of North Quay, West India Docks	Tower Hamlets	Warehouse	1802	19 July 1950	TQ3722880597; 51°30′28″N 0°01′27″W	1242440	Warehouses and general offices at western end of North Quay, West India Docks More images
Tower Bridge (that Part in London Borough of Tower Hamlets)	Tower Hamlets	Footbridge	1894	27 September 1973	TQ3369780338; 51°30′22″N 0°04′30″W	1357515	Tower Bridge (that Part in London Borough of Tower Hamlets) More images
Tower Bridge Approach	Tower Hamlets	Balustrade	1894	27 September 1973	TQ3375380489; 51°30′27″N 0°04′27″W	1065833	Tower Bridge Approach More images
Trinity Green (almshouses and Chapel) Including Gates, Railings, Wall and Piers	Tower Hamlets	Gate	1695	29 December 1950	TQ3505182028; 51°31′16″N 0°03′17″W	1241071	Trinity Green (almshouses and Chapel) Including Gates, Railings, Wall and Piers More images
56 Artillery Lane	Tower Hamlets E1	House	Mid 18th century	29 December 1950	TQ3353181667; 51°31′05″N 0°04′37″W	1357760	56 Artillery Lane More images

== Grade II* ==
Name	Location	Type	Completed	Date designated	Grid ref. Geo-coordinates	Entry number	Image
Area Railings at No 2 Christchurch Rectory	Tower Hamlets	Vicarage	Early 18th century	29 December 1950	TQ3379181787; 51°31′09″N 0°04′23″W	1240832	Area Railings at No 2 Christchurch Rectory
Baroness Burdett Coutts Drinking Fountain	Tower Hamlets	Drinking Fountain	1862	4 February 1975	TQ3605683840; 51°32′13″N 0°02′23″W	1235552	Baroness Burdett Coutts Drinking Fountain More images
V&A Museum of Childhood	Tower Hamlets	Museum	Reassembled	27 September 1973	TQ3502782920; 51°31′45″N 0°03′17″W	1357777	V&A Museum of Childhood More images
Blind Beggar and his Dog	Tower Hamlets	Sculpture	By 1963	15 April 1998	TQ3571483025; 51°31′47″N 0°02′42″W	1031598	Blind Beggar and his Dog More images
Brick Lane Jamme Masjid (former Neuve Eglise)	Tower Hamlets	Mosque	1976	29 December 1950	TQ3386181815; 51°31′10″N 0°04′19″W	1240697	Brick Lane Jamme Masjid (former Neuve Eglise) More images
Bromley Hall	Tower Hamlets	House	1993	19 July 1950	TQ3817381908; 51°31′09″N 0°00′36″W	1357791	Bromley Hall More images
Christ Church	Tower Hamlets	Parish Church	1852–1854	27 September 1973	TQ3851578561; 51°29′21″N 0°00′23″W	1357844	Christ Church More images
Whitechapel Bell Foundry	32 Whitechapel Rd, Tower Hamlets	Gate	18th century	29 December 1950	TQ3422181543; 51°31′01″N 0°04′01″W	1357529	Whitechapel Bell Foundry More images
Church of St Anne (Roman Catholic)	Tower Hamlets	Roman Catholic Church	1850	27 September 1973	TQ3414582010; 51°31′16″N 0°04′04″W	1357520	Church of St Anne (Roman Catholic) More images
Church of St George (german Lutheran Church and Vestry)	Tower Hamlets	Vestry	1762-3	29 December 1950	TQ3398681235; 51°30′51″N 0°04′14″W	1065325	Church of St George (german Lutheran Church and Vestry) More images
Church of St Mary Stratford Bow	Island Site, Tower Hamlets	Church	Possible 14th century	19 July 1950	TQ3767582961; 51°31′44″N 0°01′00″W	1065273	Church of St Mary Stratford Bow More images
Church of St Matthew	Tower Hamlets	Church	1743–1746	18 July 1949	TQ3418382462; 51°31′30″N 0°04′02″W	1065051	Church of St Matthew More images
Church of St Matthias	Tower Hamlets	Church	1650–54	19 July 1950	TQ3777680822; 51°30′34″N 0°00′58″W	1065793	Church of St Matthias More images
Church of St Paul	Tower Hamlets	Vicarage	1960	29 March 1988	TQ3682381690; 51°31′03″N 0°01′46″W	1241881	Church of St Paul More images
St Paul's Church, Shadwell	The Highway, London E1	Church	1848	29 December 1950	TQ3527880743; 51°30′34″N 0°03′07″W	1357840	St Paul's Church, Shadwell More images
East India Dock House, former Financial Times Print Works	240 East India Dock Road, Tower Hamlets	Print works	1987-1988	24 February 2016	TQ3858480983; 51°30′39″N 0°00′16″W	1430114	East India Dock House, former Financial Times Print Works More images
London Hydraulic Power Company Station with Number 37	Tower Hamlets	Managers House	1891	27 September 1973	TQ3531080527; 51°30′27″N 0°03′06″W	1242419	London Hydraulic Power Company Station with Number 37 More images
Merchant Seamens Memorial	Tower Hamlets	Sculpture	1952–1955	15 April 1998	TQ3348280729; 51°30′35″N 0°04′41″W	1031597	Merchant Seamens Memorial More images
Parnell Road Bridge at Tq 367 840	Hertford Union Canal, Tower Hamlets	Accommodation Bridge	1830	23 October 1990	TQ3676583988; 51°32′18″N 0°01′46″W	1260227	Parnell Road Bridge at Tq 367 840 More images
Phoenix School	Tower Hamlets	School	1951–52	30 March 1993	TQ3699282799; 51°31′39″N 0°01′36″W	1065730	Upload Photo
Railings and Gate with Overthrow at No 37	Tower Hamlets	House	c. 1700	29 December 1950	TQ3554181942; 51°31′13″N 0°02′52″W	1242101	Railings and Gate with Overthrow at No 37 More images
Raine's House	Raine Street, London E1W 3RJ	Teachers House	1719	29 December 1950	TQ3487680418; 51°30′24″N 0°03′29″W	1260423	Raine's House More images
Revetment Wall to South Side of Moat, from Tower Bridge Approach to Middle Tower (qv)	Tower of London, Tower Hamlets	Moat	1365–70	30 November 1989	TQ3361380450; 51°30′26″N 0°04′34″W	1065765	Revetment Wall to South Side of Moat, from Tower Bridge Approach to Middle Tower (qv) More images
St Augustine with St Philip's Church	Tower Hamlets	Church	1888–92	29 December 1950	TQ3467381600; 51°31′02″N 0°03′38″W	1065066	St Augustine with St Philip's Church More images
Thames Tunnel	Tower Hamlets	Tunnel	1825–43	24 March 1995	TQ3508380096; 51°30′13″N 0°03′18″W	1242119	Thames Tunnel More images
The Directors' House, Truman Brewery	Tower Hamlets	Managers House	1740s	29 December 1950	TQ3385282014; 51°31′16″N 0°04′20″W	1252152	The Directors' House, Truman Brewery More images
The Old Hospital Block and Raised Terrace and Railings	Tower of London, Tower Hamlets	Apartment	1989	30 November 1989	TQ3367280545; 51°30′29″N 0°04′31″W	1065767	The Old Hospital Block and Raised Terrace and Railings More images
The Royal Foundation of St Katherine	Tower Hamlets	House	Late C18/early	29 December 1950	TQ3598780972; 51°30′41″N 0°02′30″W	1065284	The Royal Foundation of St Katherine More images
The Royal Mint	Tower Hamlets	Mint	1811	27 September 1973	TQ3386980685; 51°30′33″N 0°04′21″W	1357516	The Royal Mint More images
The Widow's Son public house	Tower Hamlets	Public House	Early 19th century	23 October 1974	TQ3760382232; 51°31′20″N 0°01′05″W	1065801	The Widow's Son public house More images
Three Colts Bridge at Tq 364837	Hertford Union Canal, Tower Hamlets	Accommodation Bridge	1830	23 October 1990	TQ3643583726; 51°32′09″N 0°02′03″W	1065740	Three Colts Bridge at Tq 364837 More images
Whitechapel Gallery	Tower Hamlets	Art Gallery	1897–99	27 September 1973	TQ3398481456; 51°30′58″N 0°04′14″W	1065820	Whitechapel Gallery More images
Wilton's Music Hall	Tower Hamlets	Club	Mid 19th century	7 April 1971	TQ3424180851; 51°30′38″N 0°04′01″W	1065173	Wilton's Music Hall More images
26 Tredegar Square	Mile End, Tower Hamlets	Terraced House	1827	29 December 1950	TQ3658482802; 51°31′39″N 0°01′57″W	1242118	26 Tredegar Square More images
Museum of Immigration and Diversity	19 Princelet Street, Tower Hamlets E1	Terraced House	1719	20 August 1969	TQ3382981866; 51°31′12″N 0°04′21″W	1260421	Museum of Immigration and Diversity More images
17–18 Victoria Park Square	Tower Hamlets E2	House	c. 1690	18 July 1949	TQ3513482886; 51°31′43″N 0°03′12″W	1260103	17–18 Victoria Park Square More images
War memorial to the children of Upper North Street School	Poplar Recreation Ground	War memorial	1919	27 September 1973	TQ3772880932; 51°30′38″N 0°01′00″W	1065215	War memorial to the children of Upper North Street School More images
Isle of Dogs Pumping Station	Stewart Street	Pumping station	1988	19 June 2017	TQ3836779700; 51°29′58″N 0°00′29″W	1447069	Isle of Dogs Pumping Station More images
