= Suttons Wharf =

Coordinates: 51.5278°N 0.0413°W

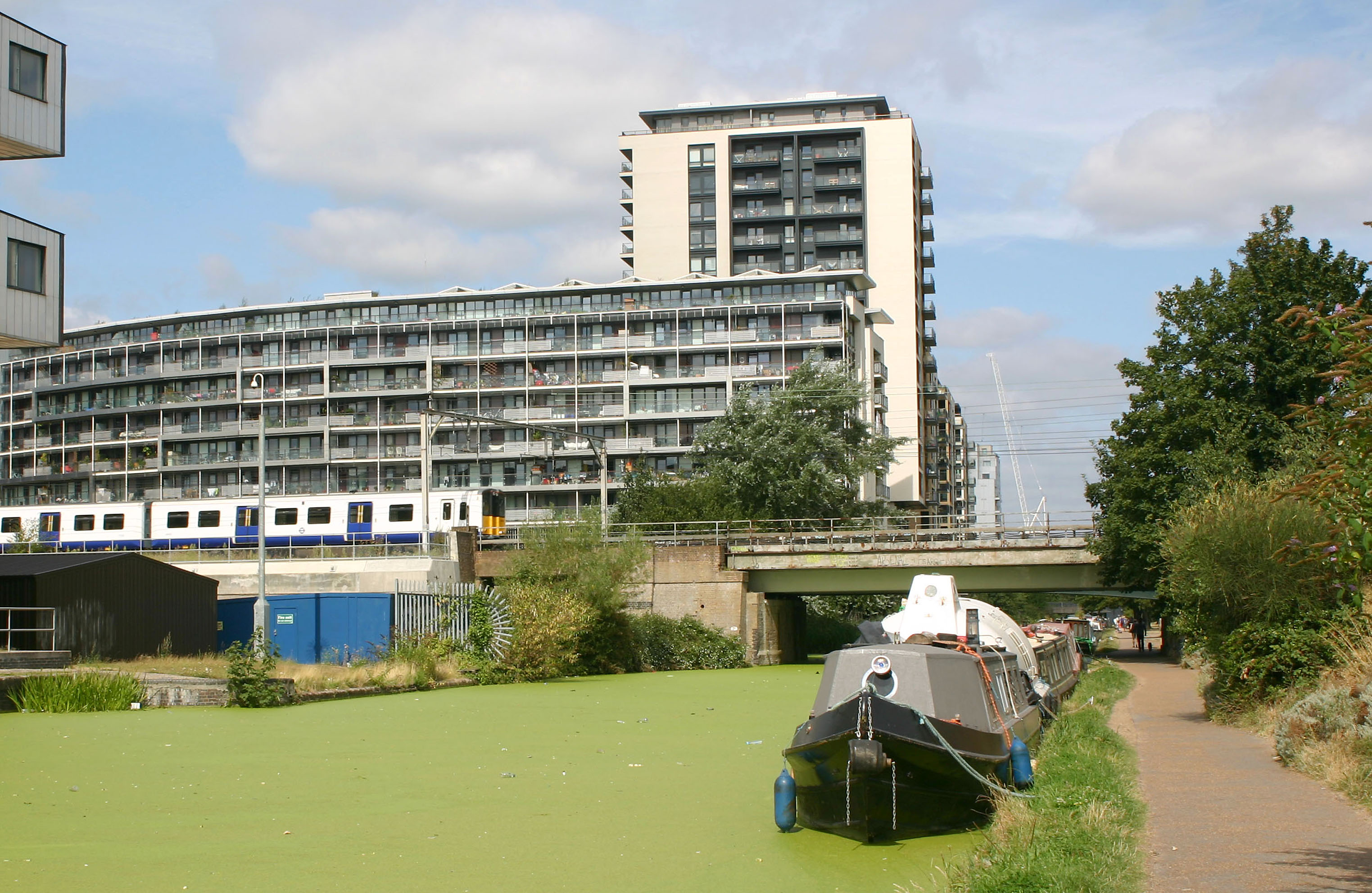
Suttons Wharf South

Suttons Wharf is a mixed-use development in Bethnal Green, east London. It was historically a wharf on the Regent's Canal, south of the Cranbrook Estate and Roman Road.
