= Trinity Hospital =

Trinity Hospital may refer to:

in England

- Trinity Hospital, Greenwich, almshouses dated 1613
- Trinity Green Almshouses, almshouses formerly known as Trinity Hospital
- Royal Trinity Hospice, Clapham Common

in Scotland

- Trinity Hospital, or Trinity College Hospital, a medieval almshouse associated with Trinity College Kirk, in Edinburgh, Scotland

in the United States

- Trinity Hospital (Little Rock, Arkansas), listed on the NRHP in Arkansas
- Trinity Hospital, run by Trinity Health, a hospital in North Dakota
- University Hospital Summerville, in the Summerville neighborhood of Augusta, Georgia, formerly known as Trinity Hospital
