= The Widow's Son =

The Widow's Son may refer to:

- The Widow's Son, London, a public house in London
- The Widow's Son (album), the sixth studio album by the rapper Apathy
- The Widow's Son (book), the second book in the series The Historical Illuminatus Chronicles
- The Widow's Son in the Windshield, the first episode of season 3 of the American television series Bones
- Hiram Abiff, Masonic legendary figure also called 'The Widow's Son'
