= East London baby abandonment case =

2017–2024 child abandonments in London, England

The East London baby abandonment case is a series of three infant abandonments that occurred in Newham, East London, England between 2017 and 2024. DNA testing conducted in April 2024 established that all three children were full siblings, making this case unprecedented in the United Kingdom for the systematic abandonment of multiple children of the same parents over an extended period.

== Discovery of the children ==
=== Harry (2017) ===
On 17 September 2017, the first child, temporarily named Harry by medical personnel, was discovered wrapped in a white blanket in a bush near Balaam Street in Plaistow Park at approximately 8:20 AM. The infant was found by a member of the public and was estimated to be less than a day old.

=== Roman (2019) ===
On 31 January 2019, a second child, given the temporary name Roman, was found by dog walkers at approximately 10:15 PM in a small children's play area off Roman Road, near the junction with Saxon Road, East Ham. The infant was wrapped in a white towel and placed inside a Sainsbury's shopping bag next to a park bench. The discovery occurred during freezing conditions, with frost reportedly forming on the child's head.

=== Elsa (2024) ===
On 18 January 2024, the third child, temporarily named Elsa by hospital staff after the Disney character from Frozen, was discovered at the junction of Greenway and High Street South in East Ham. Found by a dog walker at approximately 9:15 PM, the infant was wrapped in a towel inside a Boots carrier bag. Medical personnel estimated she was less than an hour old, with her umbilical cord still attached. The abandonment occurred on the coldest night of the year, with temperatures reaching -4 °C (25 °F).

== Investigation ==
In April 2024, DNA testing conducted by the Metropolitan Police established that all three children were full siblings, sharing the same biological parents. This connection was initially kept confidential under family court proceedings but was made public in June 2024 following legal challenges by the BBC and PA Media.

The Metropolitan Police investigation, led by Detective Inspector Jamie Humm, has involved reviewing over 450 hours of CCTV footage and establishing a complete DNA profile of the children's mother. Despite these efforts, no matches have been found in national databases.

Investigators have narrowed their search to approximately 400 homes in the East Ham and Plaistow areas, with officers conducting door-to-door inquiries and requesting voluntary DNA samples from residents. The investigation has been supported by specialist teams from the National Crime Agency, including geographical profilers and behavioural investigative advisers.

In January 2025, the charity Crimestoppers offered a £20,000 reward for information leading to the identification of the children's parents. This reward was set to expire on 18 April 2025.

== Legal proceedings ==
The case has been overseen by Judge Carol Atkinson at East London Family Court as part of a transparency pilot scheme. In June 2024, Atkinson ruled that the familial connection between the children could be reported, stating it was a matter of significant public interest given the extreme rarity of infant abandonment in the United Kingdom.

The court proceedings have revealed that all three children are of Black heritage, and their temporary names have since been changed for protection.

Harry and Roman have been successfully adopted with new identities. However, Elsa remains in foster care as her birth cannot be officially registered while the police investigation continues, preventing any final decisions regarding her permanent care.

As of May 2025, the investigation remains active. Detective Inspector Humm has expressed concerns that the mother may be vulnerable or in danger, treating her as a potential victim rather than solely a suspect. Investigators have not ruled out the possibility of additional children being abandoned.

The case has been described as "almost entirely unprecedented" by investigating officers, particularly due to the systematic nature of the abandonments and the apparent efforts to avoid detection. All three children were left in areas without CCTV coverage, suggesting deliberate planning.
