= Victoria Fountain =

Victoria Fountain may refer to:

- Victoria Fountain (Old Steine Gardens), a fountain in Old Steine Gardens, Brighton, England
- Victoria Fountain (The Plain), a fountain on The Plain, Oxford, England
- Baroness Burdett Coutts Drinking Fountain, a fountain in Victoria Park, London
