= East India Dock House =

Listed building in Tower Hamlets, London

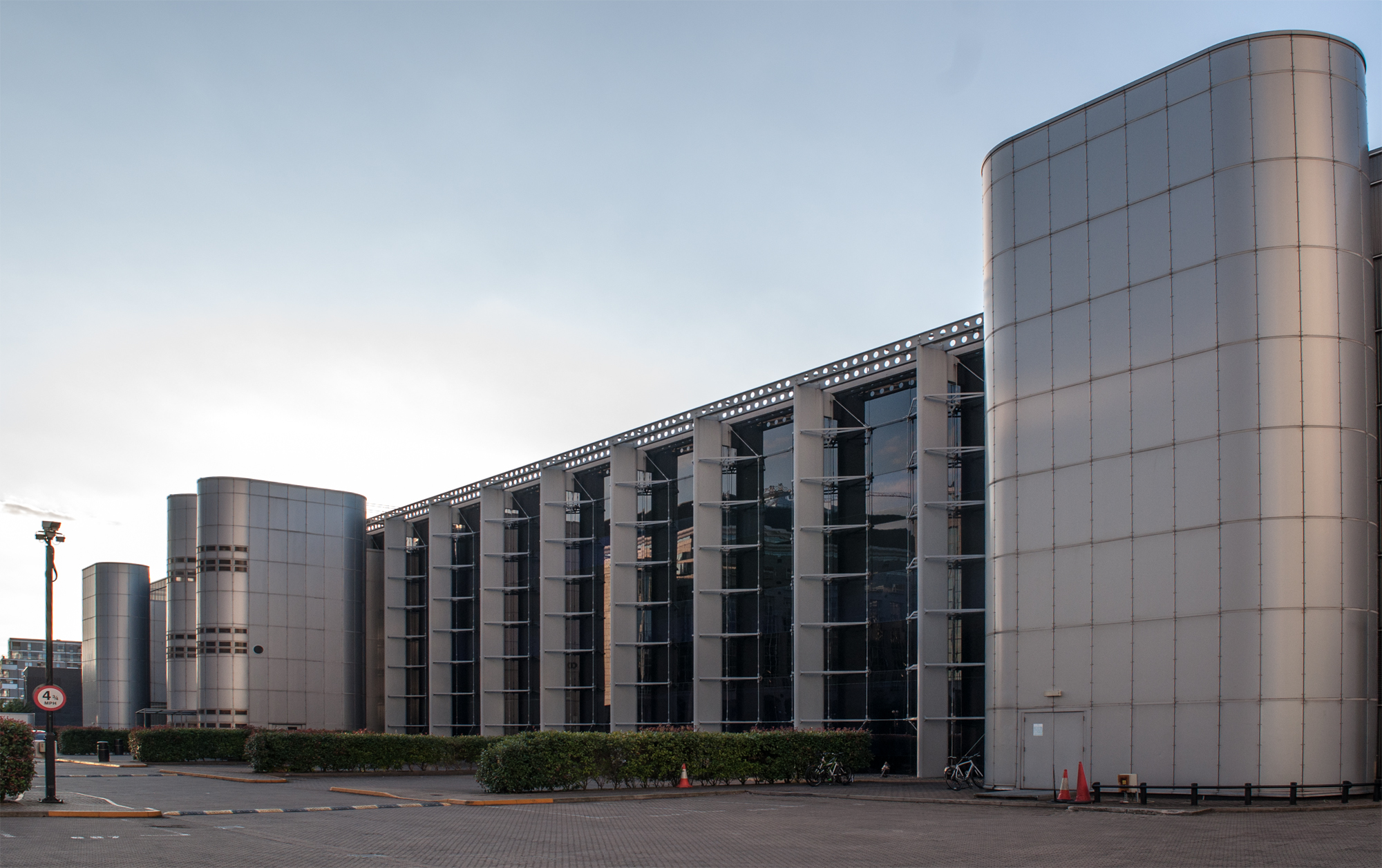

General information
- Classification: Grade II* listed building
- Location: East India Docks, 240 East India Dock Road, London, United Kingdom
- Coordinates: 51.5111°N 0.0058°W

Design and construction
- Architects: Nicholas Grimshaw & Partners

East India Dock House is a Grade II* listed building in Poplar and is in the London Borough of Tower Hamlets. It was originally built in 1988 as a printworks for the Financial Times.

== History ==
East India Dock House was built in 1988 by Nicholas Grimshaw & Partners (now Grimshaw Architects) as a printing house for the Financial Times. The building is made out of cladding, steel and glass, and is situated on East India Dock Road. During the early 1990s, it won multiple architectural awards. The Financial Times moved out in 1995, and the building was later used as a data centre. It became a Grade II* listed building in 2016.

== See also ==
- Grade I and II* listed buildings in the London Borough of Tower Hamlets
