= St Augustine with St Philip's Church, Whitechapel =

St Augustine with St Philip's Church
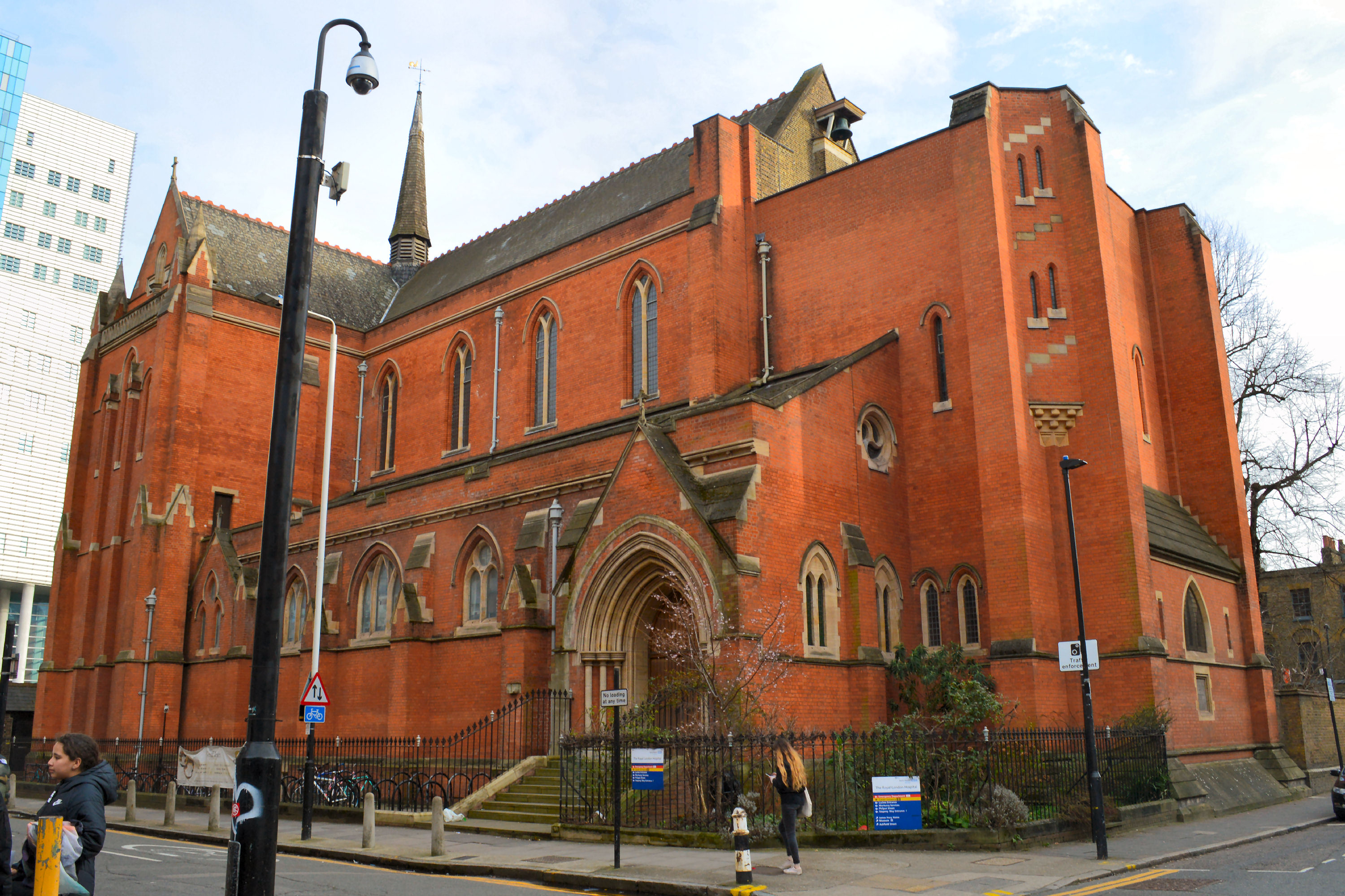
- Whitechapel Library in 2020
- Interactive map of the St Augustine with St Philip's Church area

General information
- Architectural style: Victorian
- Location: Whitechapel, London, England
- Coordinates: 51.5173°N 0.0605°W
- Opened: 27 October 1892

Website
- www.qmul.ac.uk/library/contact-us/find-us/whitechapel-library/

The St Augustine with St Philip's Church is a Grade II* listed former Victorian church in Whitechapel in the London Borough of Tower Hamlets, subsequently converted for use as a medical library for Barts and The London School of Medicine and Dentistry and known as the Whitechapel Library.

== History ==
The red-brick church was designed by Arthur Cawston, built in 1888–1892, located behind the former Royal London Hospital. It is on the site of an earlier chapel built in 1818–1821 dedicated to St Philip. After the Second World War it was combined with the parish of St Augustine's, Stepney, and made redundant in 1979. It was converted into a medical library in 1985–1988 and opened by Anne, Princess Royal, on 21 November 1988. The former Royal London Hospital Museum was located in the crypt of St Philip's Church between c2000 and 2020.

== Interior ==
There are eight medically themed stained-glass windows designed by Johannes Schreiter. These represent the London Hospital, Gastroenterology, AIDS/HIV, Ethics, Medical Diagnosis, the Influenza Pandemic, Molecular Biology and the 'Elephant Man'.

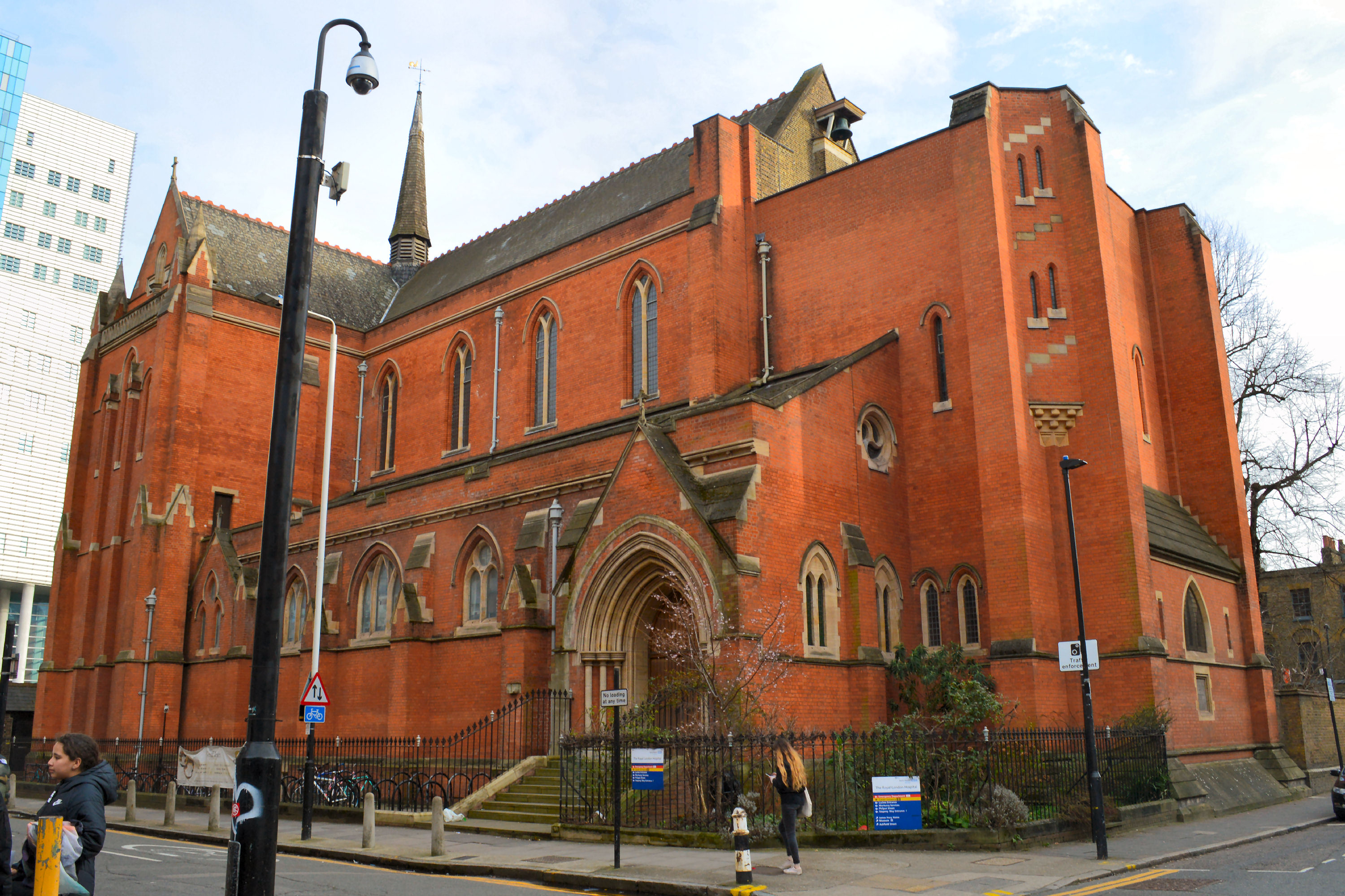
St Augustine and St Philip's Church

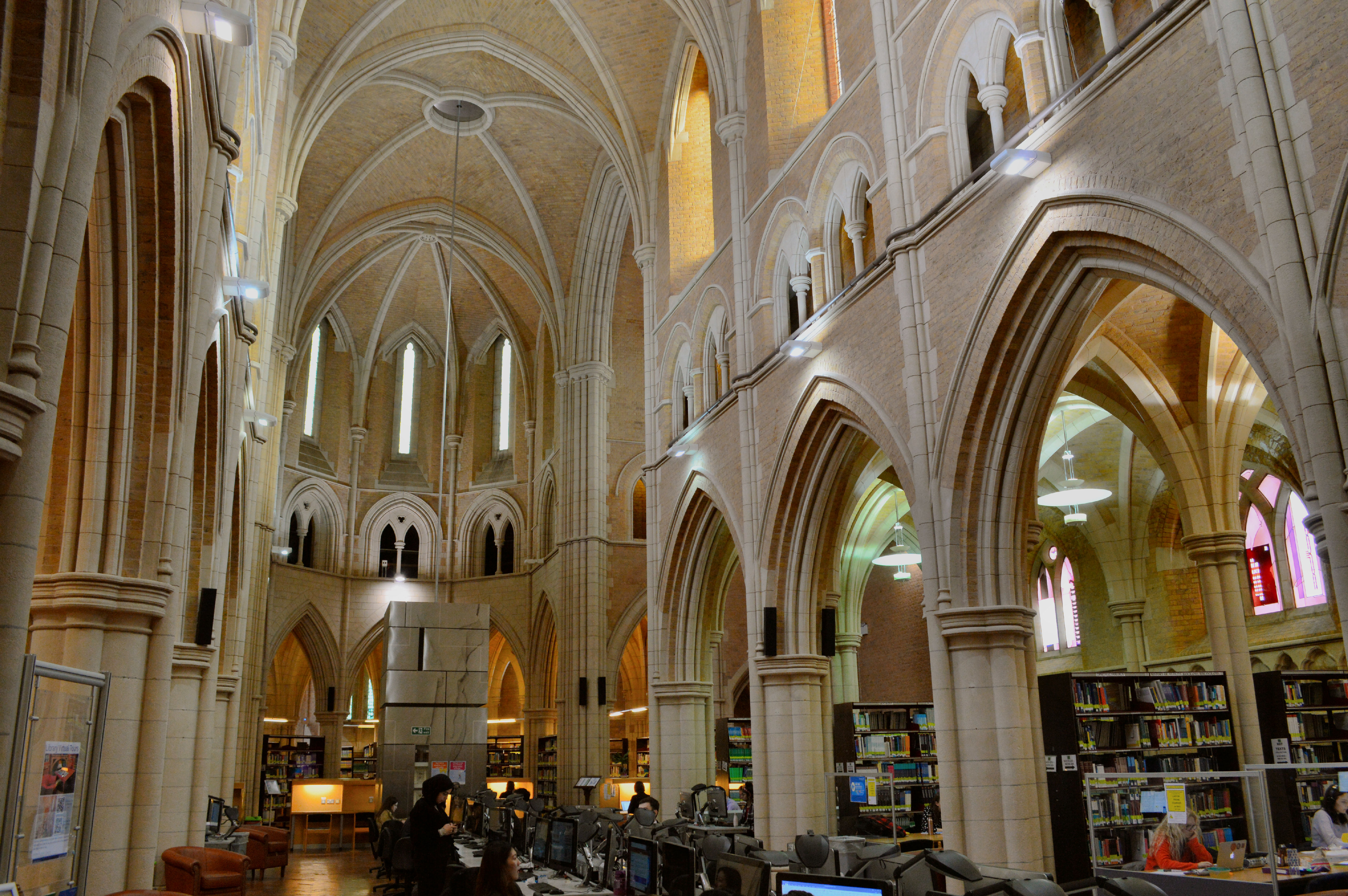
Interior

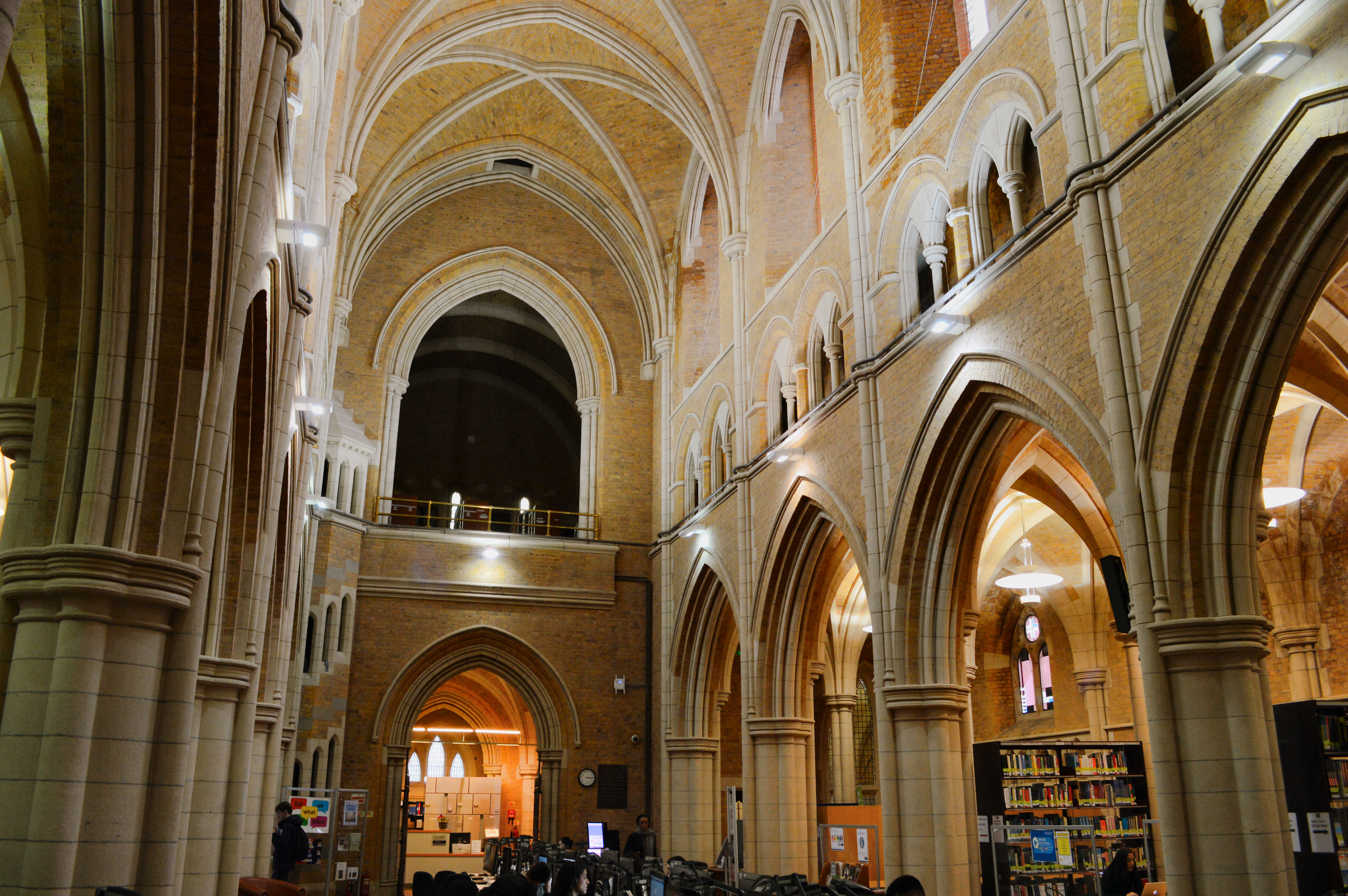
Interior

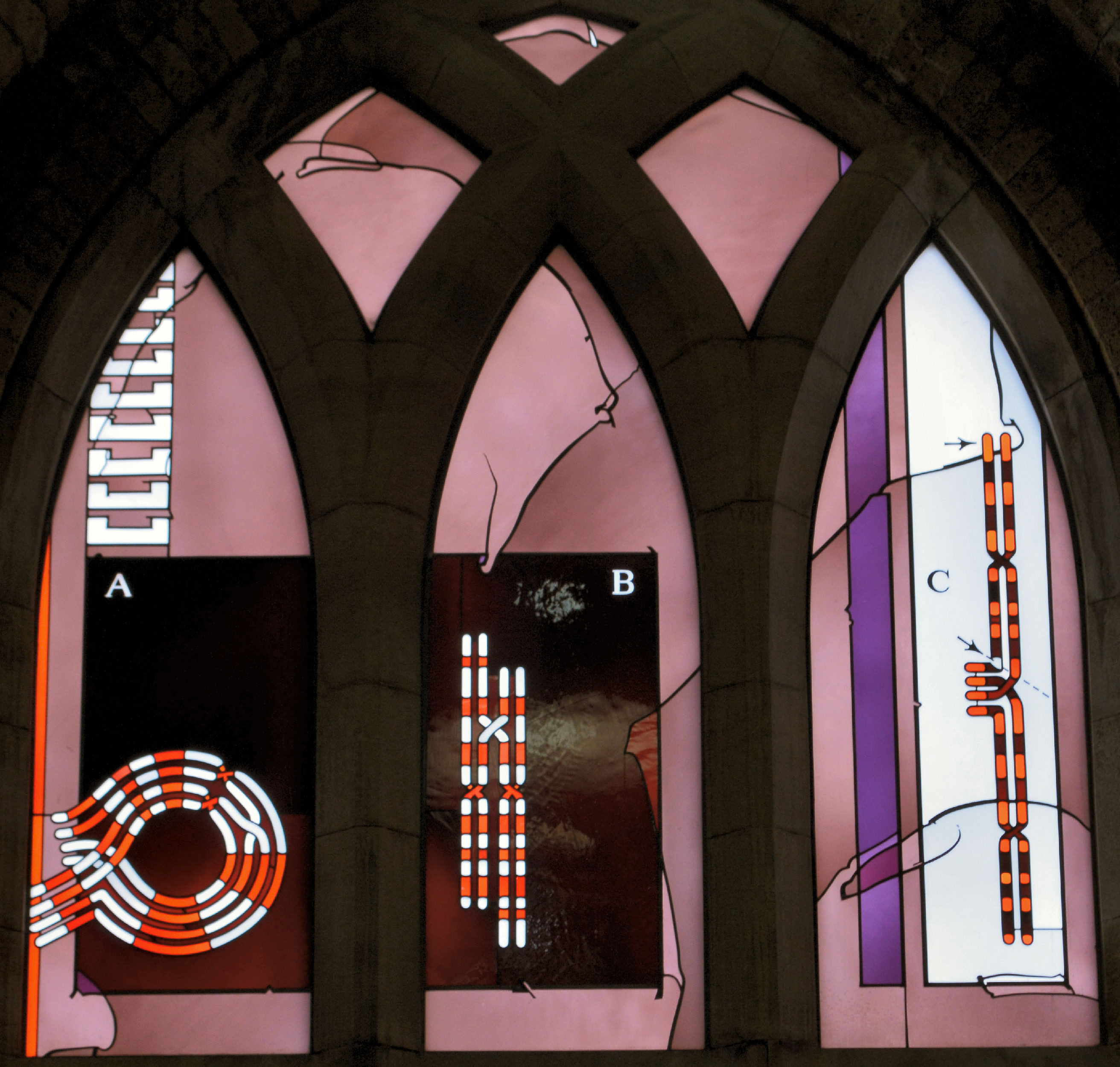
Molecular Biology Window
