= 56 Artillery Lane =

Building in London Borough of Tower Hamlets

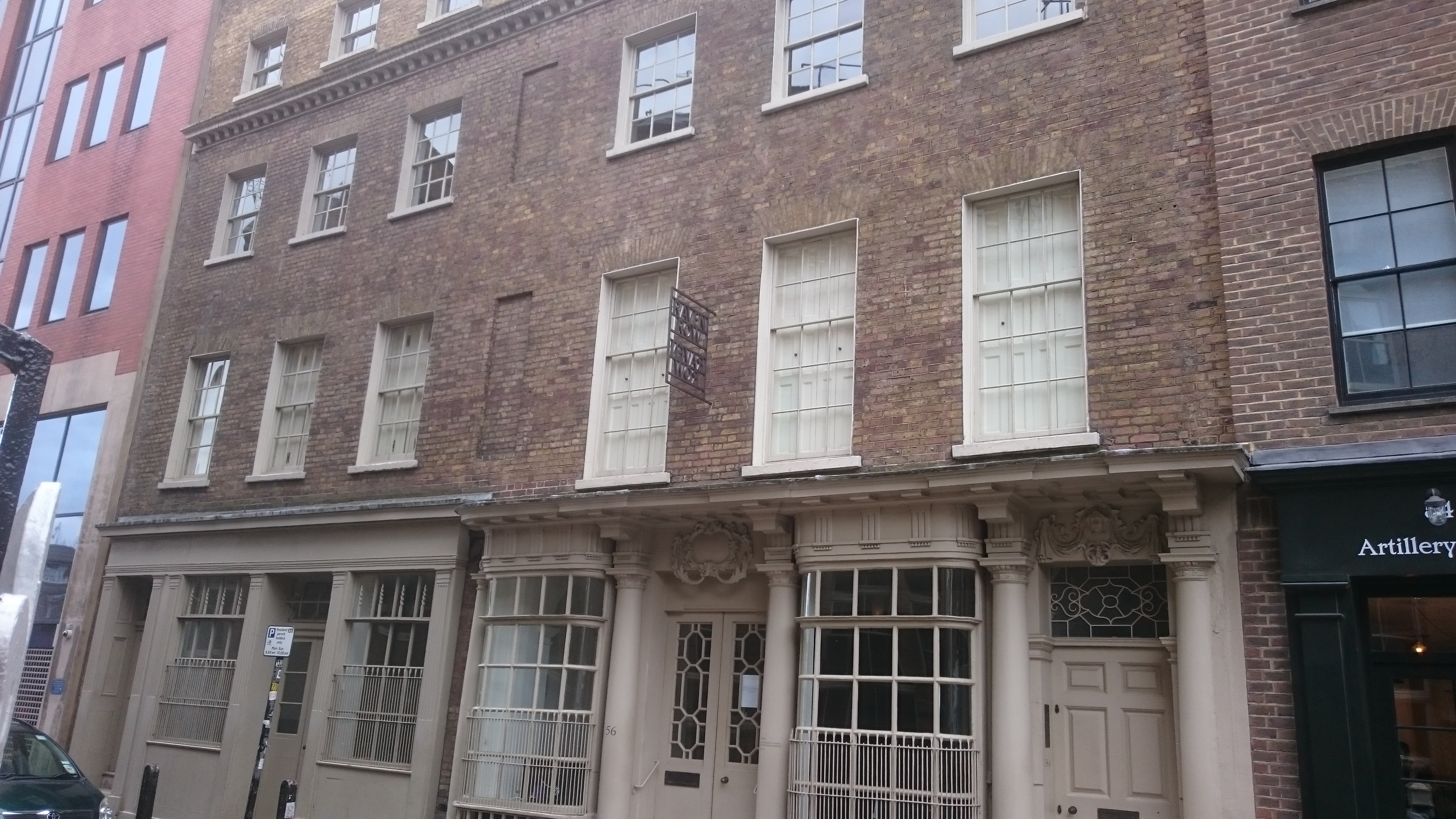
- 56 and 58 Artillery Lane, including the Georgian shopfront
- Interactive map of the 56 Artillery Lane area

General information
- Location: Spitalfields, London, E1, United Kingdom
- Coordinates: 51.518149°N 0.076879°W
- Current tenants: Raven Row
- Renovated: 1756

Design and construction
- Architect: Sir Robert Taylor

56 Artillery Lane is an 18th-century Grade I listed building in Spitalfields, London. (Note: Some sources say the building is in Bethnal Green.) The building is situated in the Artillery Passage, and was merged with the now Grade II listed building 58 Artillery Lane after the Second World War; their combined shop front is one of the oldest in London, and the combined building is used by Raven Row as a free art exhibition centre.

== History ==
It is not known exactly when the first house at 56 Artillery Lane was built, although a house appears at the location on a map of 1677. The original name of the building was 3 Raven Row. During the early 18th century, deed documents show that the building was owned by a mercer named Mathew Hebart and later a weaver named Thomas Wilkes. The building was rebuilt between 1750 and 1756, in order to accommodate Huguenot silk merchants Nicholas Jourdain and Francis Rybot who wanted to use the building as a silk shop; it is believed that Sir Robert Taylor was the architect. The 1756 building, including its shop front, still exists today, making it one of the oldest shop fronts in London. In the 19th and early 20th centuries, the building was used as a grocery shop.

After the Second World War, 56 and 58 Artillery Lane were merged into a single office building, and 56 Artillery Lane became a Grade I listed building in 1950. In 1972, the building was refurbished after a major fire. In 2006, an excavation of 56 and 58 Artillery Lane took place, and the buildings were later sold to Alex Sainsbury, heir to the Sainsbury's food chain, who converted them into the Raven Row free art exhibition space.
