= Blind Beggar and his Dog =

Sculpture by Elisabeth Frink in London

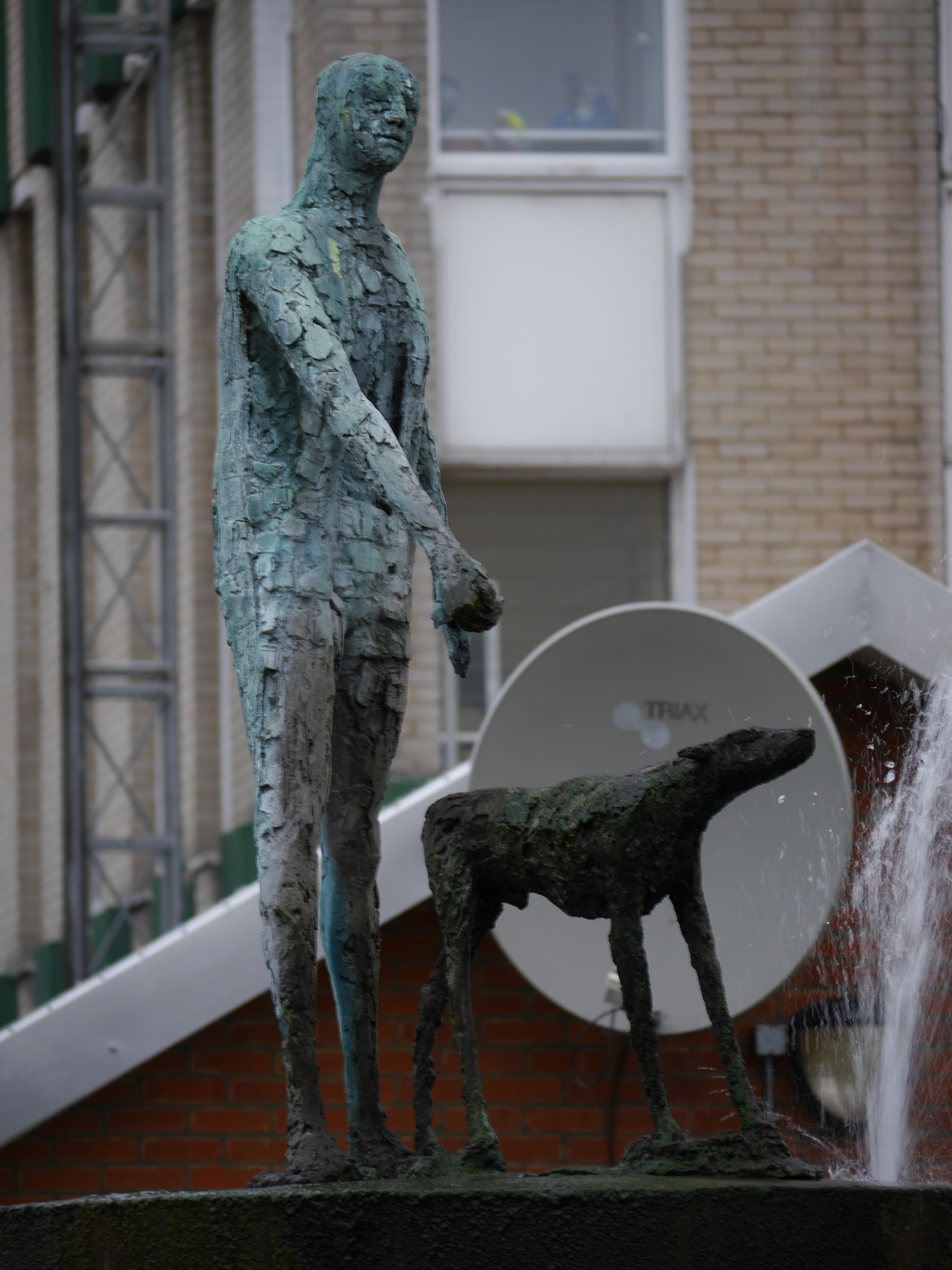
- Artist: Elisabeth Frink
- Completion date: 1958
- Type: Sculpture
- Medium: Bronze
- Subject: The Blind Beggar
- Dimensions: 2.4 m (8 ft)
- Location: Cranbrook Estate, Bethnal Green, London; 51.5298°N 0.0449°W

Listed Building – Grade II*
- Official name: Blind Beggar and his dog, Cranbrook Estate
- Designated: 15 April 1998
- Reference no.: 1031598

Blind Beggar and his Dog is a bronze statue of 1958, by the sculptor Elisabeth Frink, based on the famous ballad The Blind Beggar of Bethnal Green. It stands in the enclosed garden of Tate House, a residential development for the elderly on the Cranbrook Estate in the London district of Bethnal Green. It is a Grade II* listed structure.

== History ==
The legend of the blind beggar became popular in Tudor times and has many variants. One version tells of an English knight, Simon de Montford, who is blinded at the Battle of Evesham in 1265. Seeking to conceal his identity, he begs alms at Bethnal Green, while his beautiful daughter Besse is wooed by four suitors, three of whom are discouraged by her father's seeming inability to provide a dowry. The fourth recognises Besse's innate nobility and marries her anyway, whereupon he receives a dowry from her still-wealthy father. Bethnal Green's civic coat of arms bears the images of Besse and her blind father and the legend is commemorated in many place names in the area, including that of The Blind Beggar public house on Whitechapel Road.

Post-war reconstruction of Bethnal Green, which had suffered severely in the Blitz was led by the architectural team of Skinner Bailey & Lubetkin, the successor to Berthold Lubetkin's Tecton Group. The Cranbrook estate was the last and the largest of the three housing estates they designed. The sculpture of the Blind Beggar was commissioned by Bethnal Green Council in 1957, and was awarded to the then 27 year-old sculptor Elisabeth Frink. It was first sited on Roman Road, from where it can still be seen, but was moved to its intended location in Tate Garden in 1963.

== Description ==
The statue is in bronze, and is 8 feet high. It stands on an "elevated fountain (plinth) of overlapping stone sections". Pevsner describes the statue as "appealingly vulnerable and serious". It was given a Grade II* heritage listing in 1998.

== Sources ==
- Cherry, Bridget; O'Brien, Charles; Pevsner, Nikolaus (2007). London 5: East. The Buildings of England. New Haven, US, London, UK: Yale University Press. ISBN 9780300107012. OCLC 983755807.
