= Bromley Hall =

Tudor-era manor house in Tower Hamlets

Coordinates: 51°31′09″N 0°00′36″W

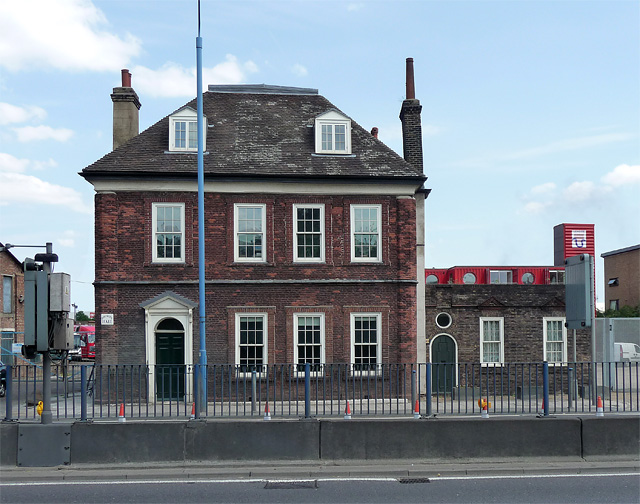
Bromley Hall

Bromley Hall is an early Tudor period manor house in Bromley-by-Bow, Tower Hamlets, London. Located on the Blackwall Tunnel northern approach road, it is now owned and restored by Leaside Regeneration. Built around 1485, it is thought to be the oldest brick house in London.

== History ==
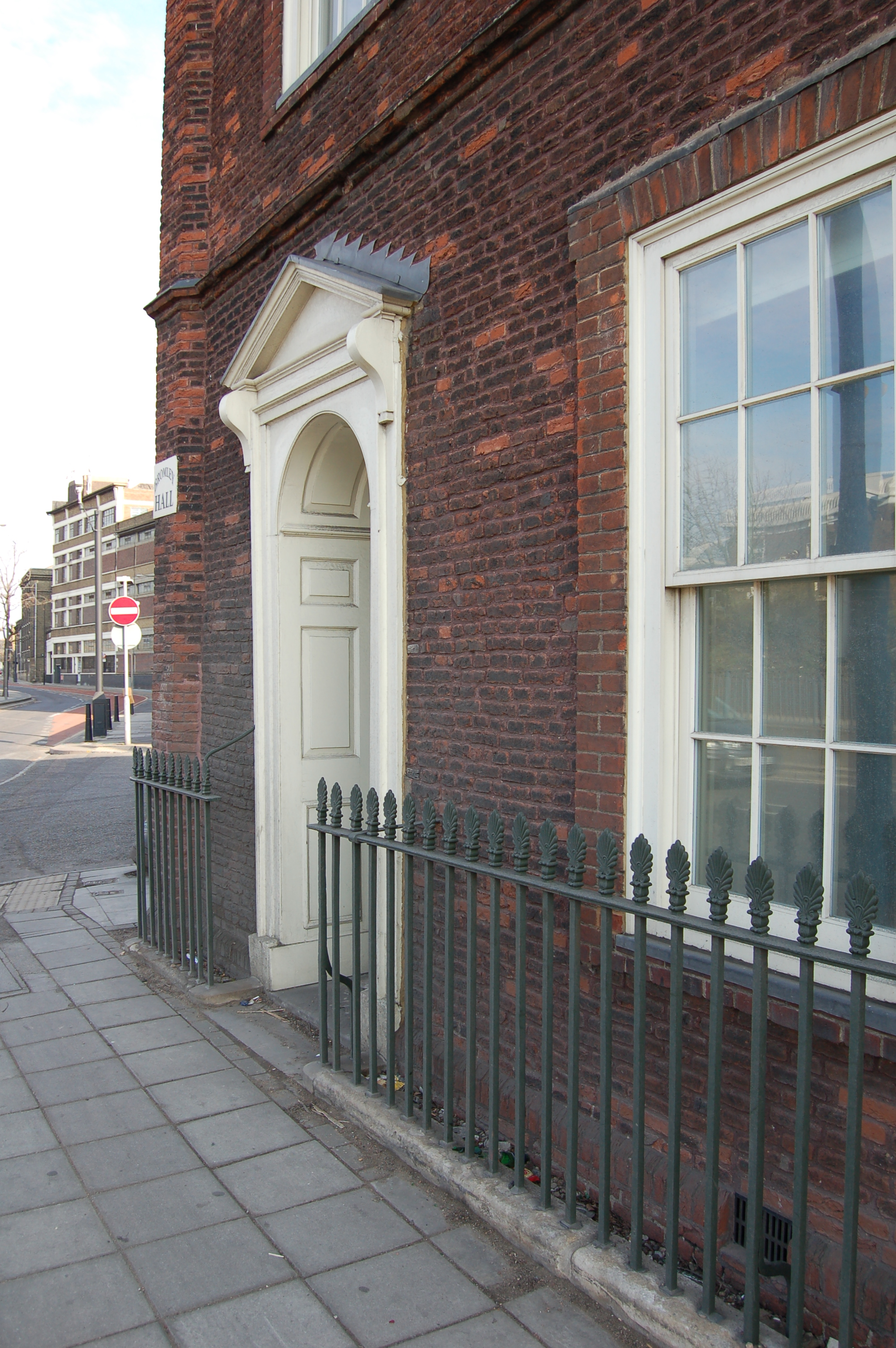
The Georgian frontage of Bromley Hall.

The Hall is thought to be the oldest brick house in London and was built by Holy Trinity Priory in the 1490s on the foundations of the 12th century Lower Bramerley Manor. These remain visible today in the cellar.

Tree ring analysis has established the Hall was constructed around 1485 at the time of the Battle of Bosworth, which signalled the enthronement of Henry Tudor and the beginning of the Tudor period. In the early stages of the project it was discovered by English Heritage and the Museum of London, that the building was once occupied by John Blount, an important figure in the court of Henry VIII and father of Elizabeth Blount, the King's teenage mistress who went on to have a son by the King.

The Hall was seized in 1531 during the Dissolution of the Monasteries, part of the English Reformation, before being refurbished for personal use by Henry VIII. The Hall was hung with rich tapestries and paintings, and the area was a popular retreat from London for hunting. Despite the toll of years, traces of the early decoration remain, including a carved hunting scene, 1490s beams complete with the original leather washers used for hanging the tapestries, Tudor windows and three 15th and 16th century wall paintings.

From the 15th century this was the manor house of Lower Bromley. The building on the corner of Gillender Street was originally thought to be the gatehouse to Bromley Manor, but it has now been established by the Museum of London that it is the main hall itself built between 1482 and 1495.

Bromley Hall had many subsequent uses, serving as a gunpowder factory during the English Civil War and later as a calico printing works and a residence for wealthy City merchants. William S. Woodin, an entertainer and author who gave a series of monologues at the Polygraphic Hall, lived at the Manor House, Brunswick Road from 1872 till his death in 1889. During the 1880s it was used by the Regions Beyond Missionary Union to house nurses, and in 1914 it became a paediatric training hospital.

== Modern use ==
The Hall suffered bomb damage during World War II. It was purchased from the Crown Estate by Alfred Tyler, who carried out reconstruction, donating the rare panelwork to the V&A Museum. It also contained a fine example of a Queen Anne staircase. The Hall was used as both a residence and office for Tylers (London) Ltd and was sold in the late 1990s when it became a carpet warehouse. Bromley Hall fell into disrepair and was placed on the Buildings At Risk register by English Heritage.

Bromley Hall was purchased in 2001 by Leaside Regeneration. This partnership has completed a £1.1m restoration project to bring the building back into use as serviced office units for small businesses. Leaside is proposing to use the ground floor for a permanent exhibition on the hall, the manor and the Tudors. It hopes to also provide a meeting room, presentation materials and access to elements of the internal structure. These consist of a staircase, an original Tudor arched oak doorframe and the remains of the cellars of a structure pre-dating Bromley Hall itself.

The restoration of Bromley Hall won two London region awards in 2006 from the Royal Institution of Chartered Surveyors.

== Sources ==
- English Heritage
- Leaside Regeneration
- No description of this house is contained in any of the historical works relating to the district, but the manor itself is described in Lysons' Environs of London (Middlesex, vol. i., p. 41), and in Dunstan's History of Bromley St. Leonard, pp. 152–154. The house is marked on Rocque's Map of London, 1741–5. Gascoyne's Map of Stepney and Neighbourhood, 1703. Brewer, Beauties, vol. x., page 290.
- "Bromley Hall | British History Online". www.british-history.ac.uk.
