= Cranbrook Estate =

Housing estate in Bethnal Green, London

Coordinates: 51.5305°N 0.0455°W

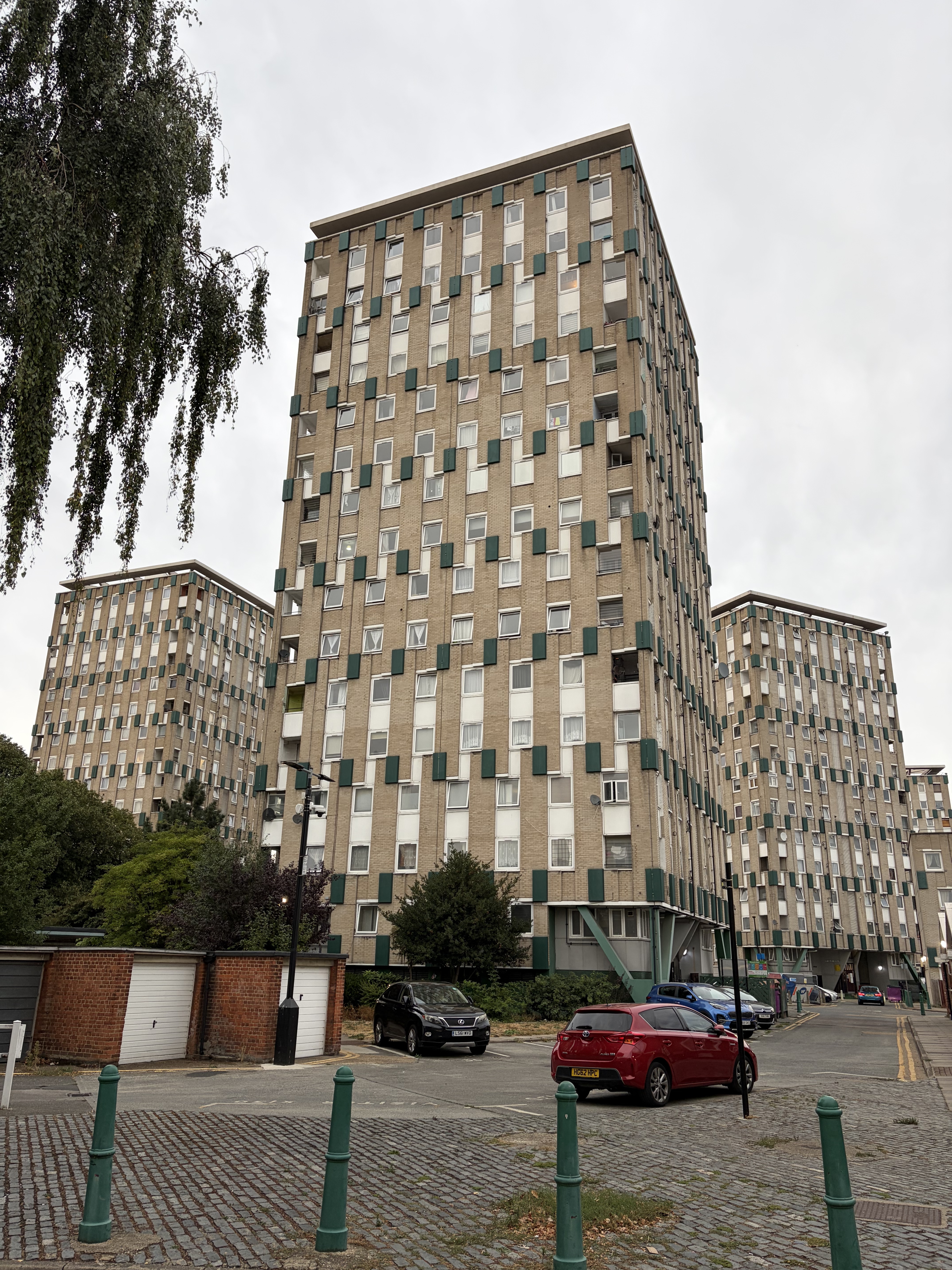
- Cranbrook Estate in 2026
- Interactive map of Cranbrook Estate

General information
- Location: Bethnal Green, London Borough of Tower Hamlets, London, England
- Status: Complete

Construction
- Constructed: 1963

Other information
- Governing body: Tower Hamlets Borough Council

The Cranbrook Estate is a housing estate in Bethnal Green, London, England. It is located next to Roman Road and is based around a figure of eight street called Mace Street. The estate was designed by Francis Skinner, Douglas Bailey and an elder mentor, the Soviet émigré Berthold Lubetkin.

== Layout ==
Cranbrook Estate consists of six tower blocks in pairs in height order. The new Estate comprised two 15-storey blocks of 60 homes each, two 13-storey blocks of 52 homes each, two 11-storey blocks of 44 homes each and five four-storey blocks of 28 homes. With ancillary dwellings, there were 529 new homes in total with 43 bedsitter flats, 115 one-bedroom flats, 271 two-bedroom flats and 100 three-bed flats.

== History ==
The site, which is east of Bonner Street and north of Roman Road, was called Cranbrook after the central street. "Terraced houses, workshops, and one large factory were replaced by a figure of eight called Mace Street, which echoed the diagonals of the street pattern to the north." The estate was designed by Soviet Russian architect Berthold Lubetkin, who pioneered modernist design in Britain in the 1930s and was helped by Francis Skinner and Douglas Bailey, with the Oxford House being an enduring presence during the area wide slum clearances and rebuilding including what would become the Cranbrook Estate as residents were rehoused into the new high rise flats.

The six tower blocks were opened in 1963 and were named after towns and boroughs that Bethnal Green (but now Tower Hamlets) was, at the time, twinned with – Alzette, Mödling, Offenbach, Puteaux, St Gilles and Velletri. Tillburg House is also named after the City of Tilburg in the Netherlands, but is a low-rise building.

Further development in the estate took place in the early 1990s, with a children playground and a community center designed by Pentarch architects on Mace Street which was built in 1993.

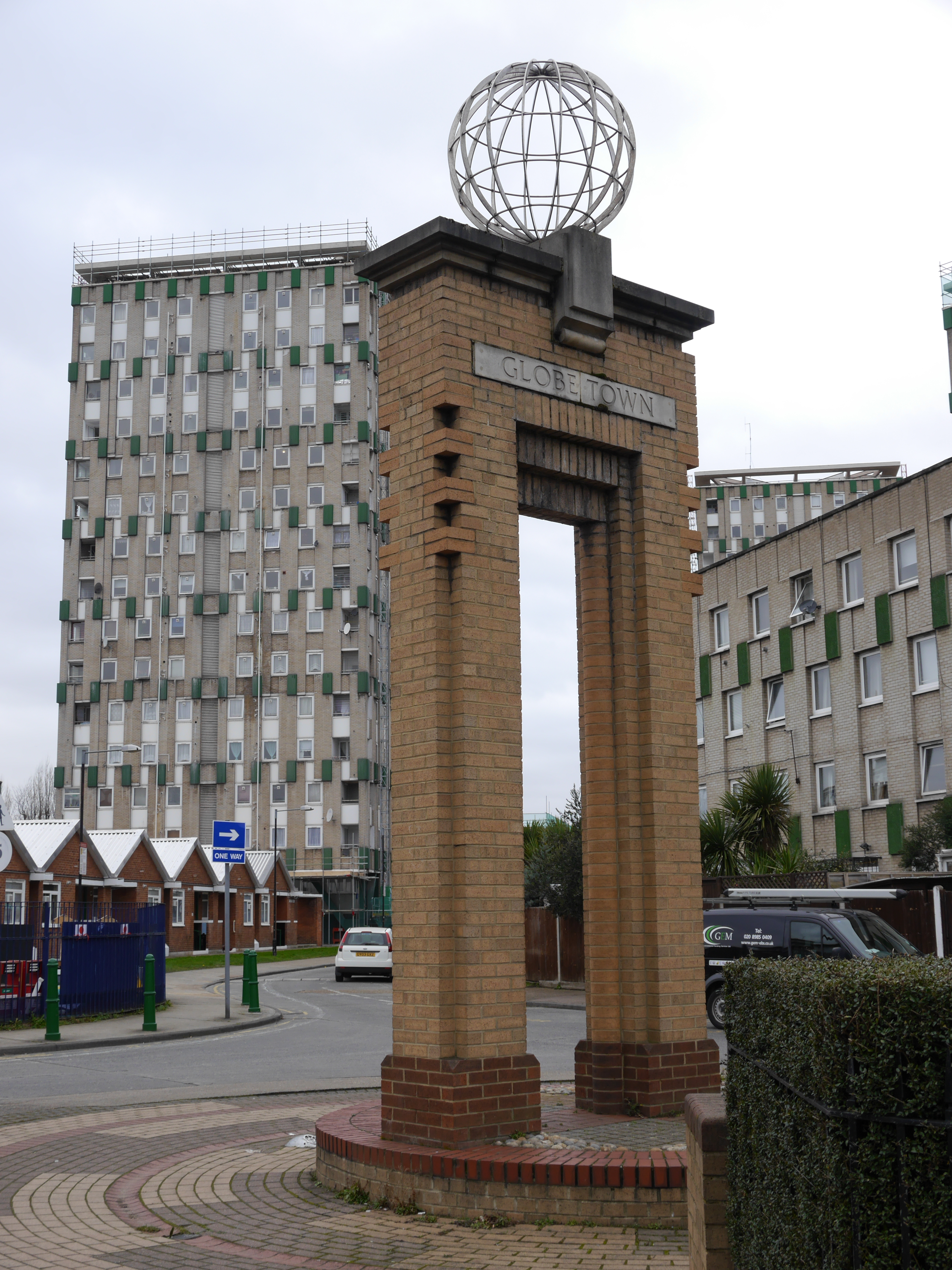
The Globe Town Arch at the junction of Roman Road and Mace Street in 2015.

In 2005 it was proposed by Tower Hamlets Council to transfer ownership to the Swan Housing Association, as the council claimed it could not fund necessary repairs and refurbishment if the estate remained in council hands, but a campaign by Defend Council Housing and then MP George Galloway who claimed that housing associations existed ‘for their own corporate reasons and their own corporate benefits’, after the campaign, the opposition secured a 72 per cent against in a tenant vote.

In 2009, local residents volunteered to set up the Cranbrook Community Food Garden. Once a children's playground that had fallen into disrepair, it was transformed into a community garden and began to grow fresh vegetables, the council also did not collect food waste from the estate, so the garden instead provided a bin outside for general food waste so it can help with the garden compost.

In June 2017, after the Grenfell Tower fire, further fire risk assessments on the high-rise buildings in the estate were conducted and the tower blocks deemed to be a 'high/substantial fire risk'. Further fire safety advice had been given to residents "to prevent a fire in the home" and reassurance has been given that they "are safe to remain in their homes". Mayor John Biggs said however, the recommendations for changes it had received "were not unmanageable".

== Art ==
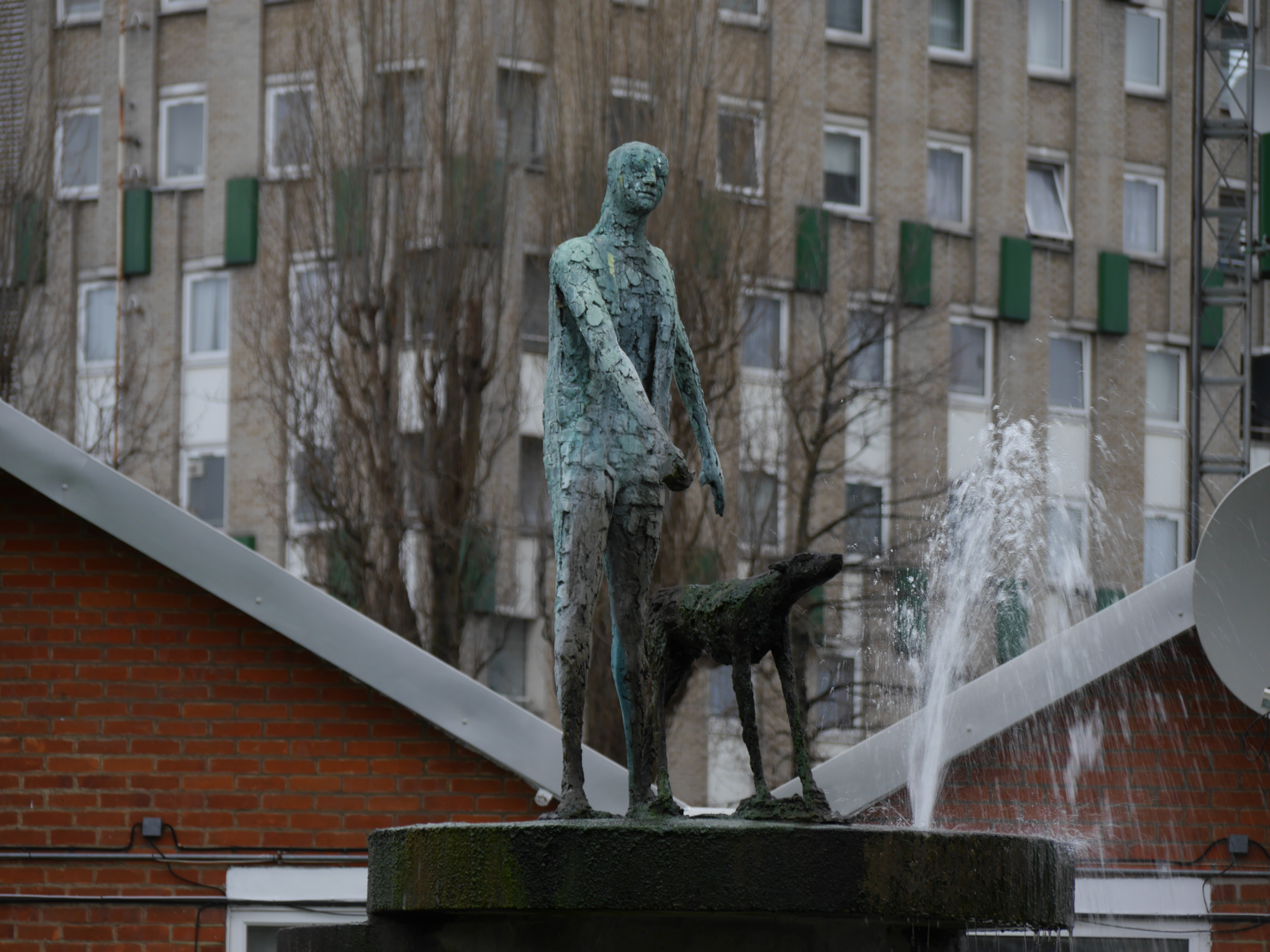
The Blind Beggar and his Dog in 2015

The Blind Beggar and his Dog is a bronze statue first displayed in 1958 by the sculptor Elisabeth Frink. It now stands in the enclosed garden of Tate House, a residential development for the elderly. First sited on Roman Road, from where it can still be seen, it moved to the Tate Garden in 1963. It received a Grade II* heritage listing in 1998.
