= Trinity Hospital (Little Rock, Arkansas) =

- U.S. National Register of Historic Places
- U.S. Historic district – Contributing property
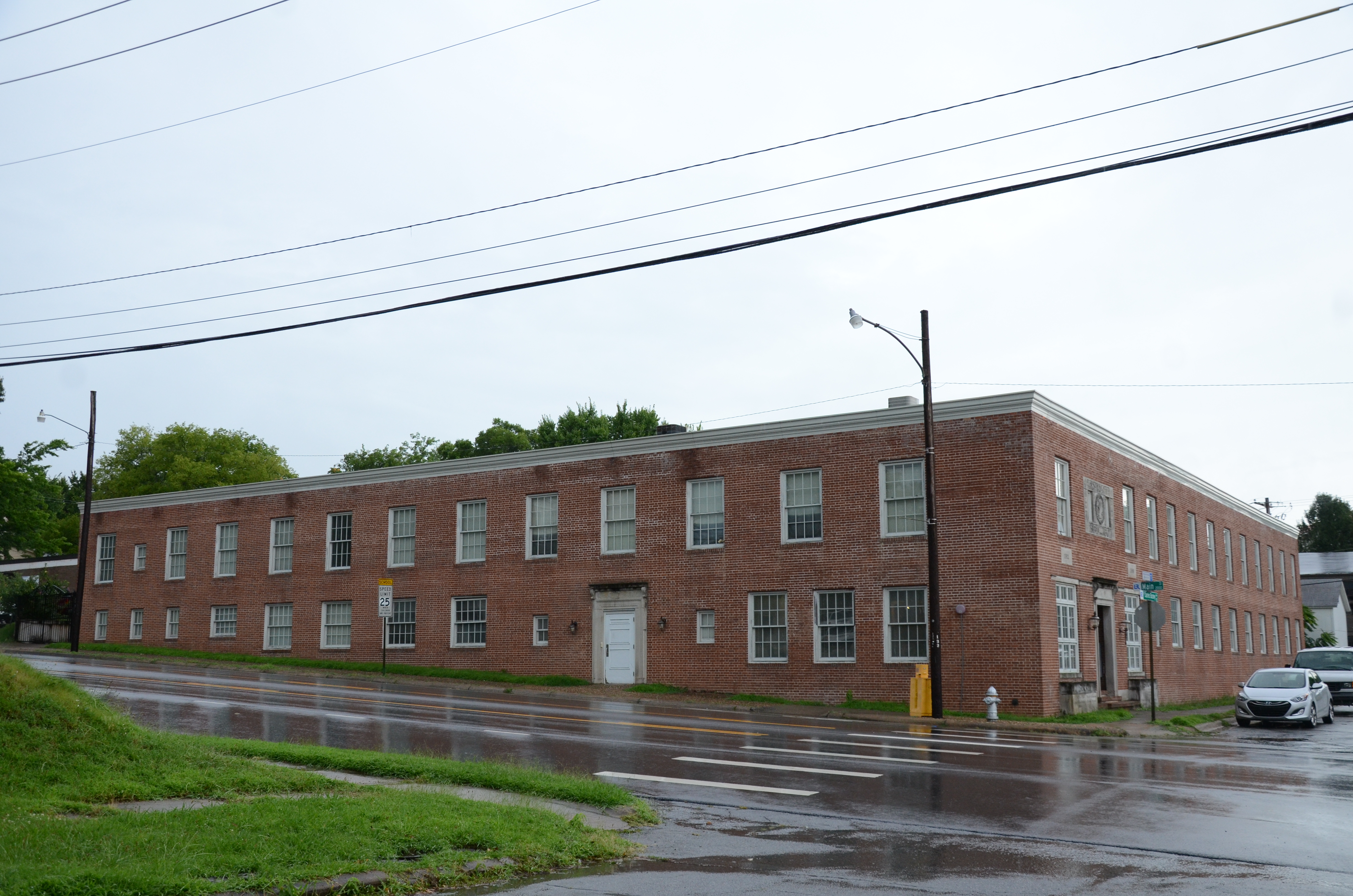

- Location within Arkansas Location within the United States
- Location: Jct. of Main and 20th Sts., Little Rock, Arkansas
- Coordinates: 34°43′46″N 92°16′26″W
- Area: less than one acre
- Built: 1931
- Architect: Maximillian F. Mayer, Herron and Rose Co.
- Architectural style: Classical Revival, Early Commercial
- Part of: South Main Street Residential Historic District (ID07000436)
- NRHP reference No.: 98001481

Significant dates
- Added to NRHP: November 18, 1998
- Designated CP: July 12, 2007

Trinity Hospital is a historic former hospital, now a mixed-used commercial and residential building, at 20th and Main Streets in Little Rock, Arkansas. It is a two-story brick structure, roughly square in shape with a central courtyard and an ell projecting from its southern side. It was designed by local architect Maximilian F. Mayer and built in 1924, with restrained Classical Revival elements. The building is historically notable as the first place in Arkansas where the now-common health maintenance organization methods of funding and delivering health care were implemented. The building now houses the offices of a non-profit and low-income housing.

The building was listed on the National Register of Historic Places in 1998.

== See also ==
- National Register of Historic Places listings in Little Rock, Arkansas
