= Baroness Burdett Coutts Drinking Fountain =

Drinking fountain in Victoria Park, London

Coordinates: 51°32′13″N 0°02′23″W

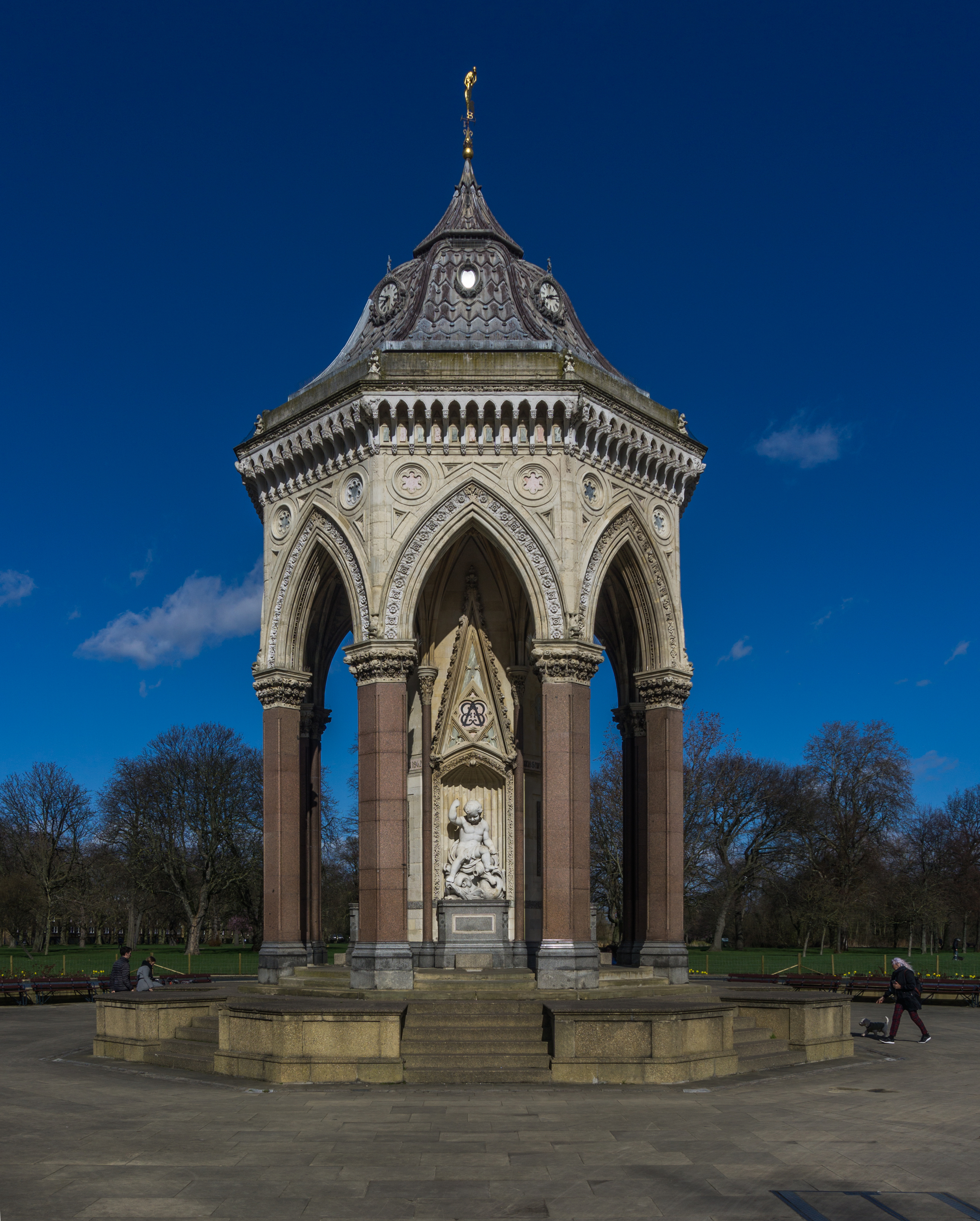
The Baroness Burdett Coutts Drinking Fountain

The Baroness Burdett Coutts Drinking Fountain (also known as the Victoria Fountain) is a Grade II* listed drinking fountain situated in Victoria Park, London.

== History ==
The fountain was designed in 1862 by Henry Astley Darbsihire and erected by Baroness Burdett Coutts at a cost of £5,000. The fountain is made out of granite, and is a 28 feet (8.5 m) diameter octagon with 60 feet (18 m) red granite columns, in the Gothic style, and is situated near to the Hackney gate of the park. The opening of the fountain in 1862 was attended by 10,000 spectators. The year after the fountain was installed, The Illustrated London News called Victoria Park the best people's park in London, due to its facilities such as the fountain. In his Dictionary of London, Charles Dickens, Jr. described the fountain as "beautiful".

In 1975, the fountain was given Grade II* listed status by Historic England. In 2011, the fountain was refurbished as part of a major restoration of Victoria Park. The fountain is no longer in public use.
