= Roman Road, London =

Street in London, England

Roman Road
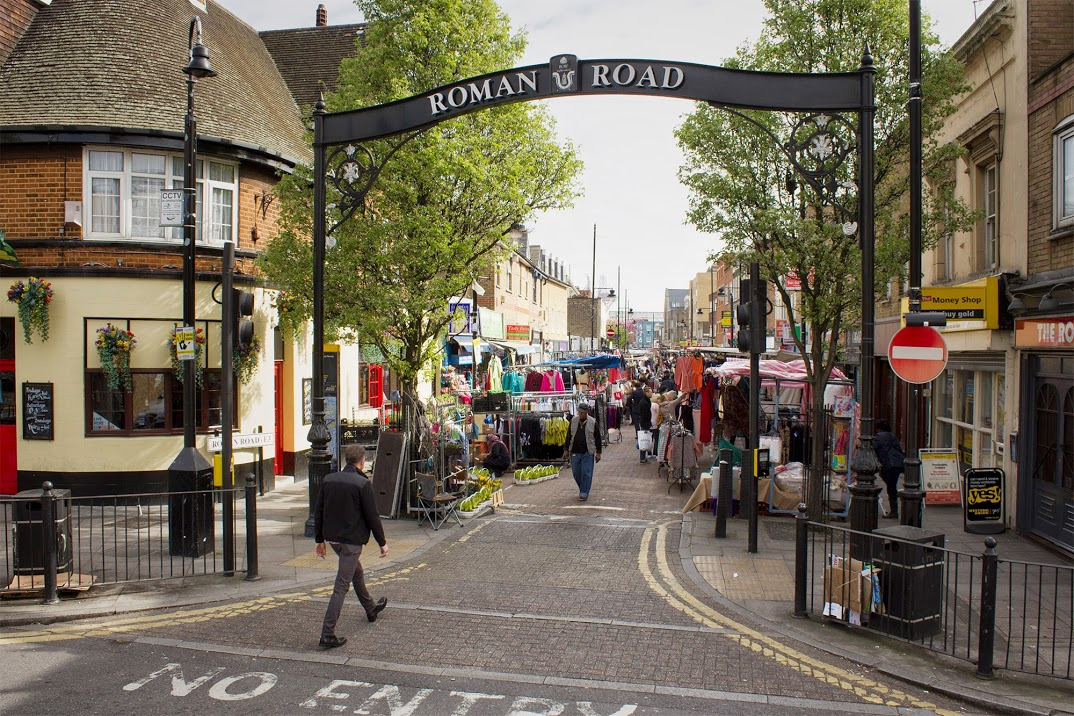
- Roman Road Market western entrance
- Interactive map of Roman Road
- Location: Bethnal Green/Old Ford, Tower Hamlets, London
- Postal code: E2, E3
- Nearest train station: Bethnal Green
- Coordinates: 51.53248°N 0.03169°W

Roman Road is a road in East London, England, in the London Borough of Tower Hamlets entirely on the B119 on the B roads network. It lies on the old Roman Pye Road of the Roman Empire running from the capital of the Iceni at Venta Icenorum (near modern Norwich) to Londinium (modern City of London) and today hosts a street market. Beginning in Old Ford at its eastern end, it passes into Bethnal Green to its western end.

Initially believed to be a path paralleling an ancient Roman road connecting London to Colchester, discoveries of Roman artefacts in the 19th and 20th centuries have lent credence to its historical significance. By the mid-19th century, the Metropolitan Board of Works established Roman Road, formalising the ancient Driftway into a vital thoroughfare. This area, previously rural, rapidly urbanised, becoming a focal point for social and political activity.

Roman Road was notably a centre for the East London Federation of Suffragettes, with Sylvia Pankhurst's significant presence in Old Ford Road, contributing to local welfare through food and work provision, and leading suffragette demonstrations that became confrontational with authorities. Additionally, the road has been a hub for political radicalism, with noted socialists and public meetings emphasising the community's engagement in social debates and reforms.

Local landmarks like Bow Baths and the Passmore Edwards library, alongside churches like St Paul’s and St Barnabas, underscore the area's commitment to public services, cultural enrichment, and architectural heritage. The evolution of housing along the Roman Road, from Victorian terraces to modern estates, reflects broader social changes and challenges in urban development and community building. The Roman Road Market dates back to at least 1843, and along with the surrounding shops and public spaces, continues to be a part of local life.

== History ==
There is some debate about whether the Romans marched along what is now Roman Road, which runs more or less parallel to the Roman road which connected London to Colchester. Roman remains were found in an 1845 dig on the current site of Armagh Road, and there have been further Roman finds since, which seems to justify the name. Early maps show a 'Driftway', or footpath, where Roman Road now runs in an area that was rural up to the middle of the 19th century (old maps show a windmill near the present Ford Close). Old Ford is the main road and a toll road links Mile End to Hackney (Grove Road).

The Metropolitan Board of Works, set up in 1855 to provide a sewer system for London, was also responsible for improving roads and this was when Roman Road, as it was called from the start, was built, on the Driftway, extending Bethnal Green Road and Green Street eastwards. It was paid for by local residents and public and private sources. In the 1870s, there were discussions about extending Roman Road to Stratford, but this was not to be. In the 1930s, Bethnal Green's Green Street was merged into Roman Road – and all the shop and house numbers were changed accordingly.

=== East London Federation of Suffragettes ===
Roman Road was a centre of Suffragette activity. The headquarters of the East London Federation of Suffragettes, where Sylvia Pankhurst lived, was at 400 Old Ford Road. The Federation did much to help local people, providing food and work. There were many home grown suffragettes such as Mrs Savoy, a brushmaker, who was one of the Deputation of East End women to Downing Street in 1914. Sylvia Pankhurst wrote on Mrs Savoy's death: ‘The streets of Old Ford are colder and greyer with her loss’.

The Suffragette newspaper, Women's Dreadnought was published from 321 Roman Road, printed by Arbers in Roman Road. They held regular meetings at Bow Baths and ran a stall in Roman Road market selling the 'Women's Dreadnought' together with the toys they made in their 'Co-operative Toy Industry' at 45 Norman Grove and second hand goods and to raise funds and promote the cause.

Roman Road saw demonstrations, sometimes violent. On 13 October 1913, Sylvia Pankhurst, banned from appearing at meetings, went in disguise to a Suffragette meeting in Bow Baths. The police were hot on her tails and 'The people held the door against the detectives but policemen sprang onto the platform from behind the curtains. To the shouts of 'Jump, Sylvia, jump!', Sylvia jumped ...into the audience, to see policemen smashing chairs and striking people in the audience...Sylvia escaped using someone else's hat and coat.' A few weeks later, the press reported 'The Battle of Bow' in which a police officer was charged for assaulting a labourer supporting a Suffragette demonstration.

=== Roman Road radicalism ===
In 1887, social researcher and philanthropist Charles Booth toured the area with a policeman and reported 'Beale Road is a hotbed of socialists. They have a club in Ford Street (many of the windows broken) and abound round about. [George] Lansbury is their leader. Not such a bad chap. A rare talker – all these socialist fellows are!' And from the number of public meetings reported in the East London Advertiser and Daily Herald, many local people attended were actively involved in political debate. In the 19th century, the Hand and Flower Inn, at the junction of Roman Road and Parnell Road, was the venue for political and civic meetings. Bow Baths later became the main place for local public meetings, but the Alpha Lecture Hall, Roman Road, and the Ethical Hall, 78 Libra Road, also hosted debates.

=== Local landmarks ===
==== Bow Baths ====
Bow Baths on Roman Road was opened in 1892 to bring relief to the majority of local residents who relied on the tin bath, Victoria Park lake or the Canal Water for a bath or a swim. In 1896, the baths were used 176,000 times by a grateful public, and there are reports of queues outside every Saturday in 1921. It offered First or Second Class cold, warm and 'spray' baths, as well as vapour baths. It had a wash house and a swimming pool which had events such as polo tournaments. The heat generated from the baths provided heating and hot water to the Bow Library via pipes under the road.

Bow Baths provided a meeting and entertainment venue with concerts and variety shows competing, and often combining with, political rallies. Regular Sunday evening lectures had speakers including Sylvia Pankhurst, George Lansbury (who lived round the corner in St Stephens Road) and Ben Tillett on topics ranging from war and peace, the right to vote to the Welsh Miners Strike of 1914

Bow Baths was badly bomb damaged during the Second World War and never re-opened. In 1961, a new Bow Baths was built in Sutherland Place which included 60 slipper baths and a laundry block. This closed in 1977 as new housing and home improvements dramatically increased the number of homes with bathrooms.

The original building remained semi-derelict. In the 1970s there was pressure for it to become a community centre and a lease was granted in 1981 to the Bow Baths Community Centre. Now the building is no more.

==== Bow Library (Idea Store) ====
The first stone for the Passmore Edwards library in the Roman Road was laid on 19 October 1900. This followed a vote by parishioners four years earlier 'most emphatically in favour of' adopting the Free Libraries Act. The stone was laid by John Passmore Edwards, a journalist, newspaper owner and philanthropist, who gave £4000 to build the library. The basement of the building could take 10,000 books. The ground floor has a newsroom with space for 33 readers and the lending library had 12,000 books. On the first floor was a magazine and reference reading room with space for 56 readers. The library opened in 1911. The original red brick and stone building is Grade II listed, including the 'Macullum Clock', so named after an eastend philanthropist and member of the Bow and Bromley Liberal and Radical Association.

The library soon proved too small and an extension was planned from 1926 in on a small site in Vernon Road. Eventually, work started in 1939, but the war intervened and the proposed site was used as a public air raid shelter. The extension was finally completed and opened in 1950. But this too was too limited and a new extension was built in Stafford Road in 1962. The new arrangement still didn't meet modern needs an so a brand new library was built on an old Council Estate car park in William Place opening in 1998. This building is in Bow and incorporated community facilities, notably a GP surgery and is now St Stephen's Health Centre. A new philosophy about libraries led to the Roman Road having a new library again, when the first Ideas Store in the country opened in May 2002 in Gladstone Place.

==== St Paul's Church ====
St Paul's Church, on the north-eastern corner of Roman Road and St Stephen's Road in Old Ford, dates from 1878 and is Listed Ecclesiastical Grade C. It is next to the former site of St Stephens Church, built in 1858 and destroyed by enemy action in the Second World War. St Paul's received a £3million Lottery grant for renovation work to include a café, community gym, exhibition and meeting space, completed in 2003.

The St Paul's Church refurbishment by Shoreditch architects Matthew Lloyd was shortlisted for the biennial award for Religious Architecture in 2008 run jointly by ACE and RIBA. The Commendation recognised the spectacular design of a four-storey steel framed structure, dubbed 'the ark' inserted within the west end of the church. Clad in tulipwood, the ark allows the chancel to be retained at its original scale.

==== St Barnabas Church ====
St Barnabas, on the corner of Roman Road and Grove Road at the very eastern end of the old Metropolitan Borough of Bethnal Green, was built by the Baptists as a chapel in 1865, but they decided it was too grand, and built Victoria Park Baptist Church a stone's throw behind in Grove Road. St Barnabas was sold to the Church of England. Second World War bomb damage resulted in the removal of its spire, leaving the capped and stunted steeple seen today. Much of the church was rebuilt in the mid-1950s. The sculptor Don Potter added a frieze of the Four Evangelists. The Church also has a memorial by the entrance to local men who lost their lives in the First World War.

=== Cinemas and music halls ===
Many pubs incorporated music hall and theatre. The Royal Victor Music Hall across the Canal from Bow Wharf served the area but there were many more across the East End. With the advent of cinema, specific buildings were needed. The Roman Road was served by four cinemas, all built between 1910–1912 and all closed after the war:

- Geisha Cinema, 71–73 Parnell Road.
- Old Ford Picturehouse, 55 St Stephens Road
- Victoria Picturehouse, 184-6 Grove Road. The only building still remaining and now a church.
- Empire Picture Drome, 62–66 Green Street.

=== Grime music ===
The eastern end of Roman Road in Bow was an important centre in the development of the Grime genre. Many of the key figures in the early grime scene, such as Dizzee Rascal, Wiley, Tinchy Stryder and Mercston all grew up around Roman Road.

Record store Rhythm Division, which was located at 391 Roman Road, served as a key community hub for both developing and established Grime MCs during this time. The store was frequented by artists like Wiley, Skepta and Dizzee Rascal before its eventual closure in 2010.

Many of these artists have paid homage to this by mentioning Bow in their lyrics and naming albums and EPs after the area, for example Wiley's song titled ‘Bow E3’, and Dizzee Rascal's 2020 album ‘E3 AF’.

Roman Road features in several grime music videos including Mercston's first music video for ‘Summertime’, and Skepta's video for ‘That’s Not Me’.

In a 2014 article with the Guardian, Wiley, dubbed the ‘godfather of grime’, attributed Roman Road's liveliness and the role it played in developing Grime, saying ‘it had that street market culture, every Tuesday, Thursday and Saturday – it was the nurturer, it all has something to do with the Dizzees and Wileys coming through.’

=== Roman Road housing ===
Roman Road was lined with streets of Victorian housing of mixed size and quality. A few had servants and their own stables, while others had multiple occupants and very poor conditions such as Victoria Cottages – two roomed back-to-back houses just off Roman Road. The area was typical of the east end with a mix of the very poor and well to do living only a street apart. Due to the Luftwaffe (first flying bomb in London fell 200 yards from Roman Road in Grove Road in June 1944) and post-war slum clearance, a large slice of the Victorian housing disappeared, to be replaced by housing estates, both local and London Council.

Susan Lawrence House opened with 9 flats in Zealand Road in 1954. Skinner, Bailey & Lubetkin designed Lakeview Estate where Grove and Old Ford Roads meet in 1958. The Metropolitan Borough's most ambitious project came in 1959 with another Lubetkin designed estate between Old Ford and Roman roads: the Cranbrook Estate was built on a site that was previously terraced houses, workshops, and one large factory. Cranbrook officially opened in 1964 with 530 dwellings contained in blocks named after towns twinned with Bethnal Green and after demolished streets. It won an award from the Civic Trust.

In 1966, Keats House in Roman Road was built. In 1969, twelve blocks of 4-storeyed flats were built on a 7½ acre site around Lanfranc Road, between Roman, Arbery, Grove, and Medway roads, and completed in 1971–76, giving 269 dwellings, grouped amid landscaping and named after naval destroyers. This is the Lanfranc Estate which runs along the Roman Road.

The Victorian houses which survived continued to provide private rented and owner occupied housing, but much was in poor repair. In 1975, the area around Chisenhale Road became the Driffield General Improvement Areas where all property was to be modernised. The council's greatest challenge by the 1970s came from its own estates – 'cramped, unlovely and unloved'. Not only did the older ones need refurbishment but the newer were plagued by vandalism in tower blocks, or by defects which were present in 69 per cent of flats on Lanfranc estate, for example, in 1978.

Huge redevelopment has taken place on many of the estates, notably Lefevre, named from Lefevre Street, in turn named after a Huguenot family who made their wealth as distillers, millers and dyers. John Lefevre owned much land and property around Bow and Old Ford. Housing associations assumed an increasing importance from the 1980s. Old Ford Housing Association (now part of Circle Housing) took over from the council as landlord to most of the housing estates bordering Roman Road.

== Roman Road Market ==
Roman Road Market
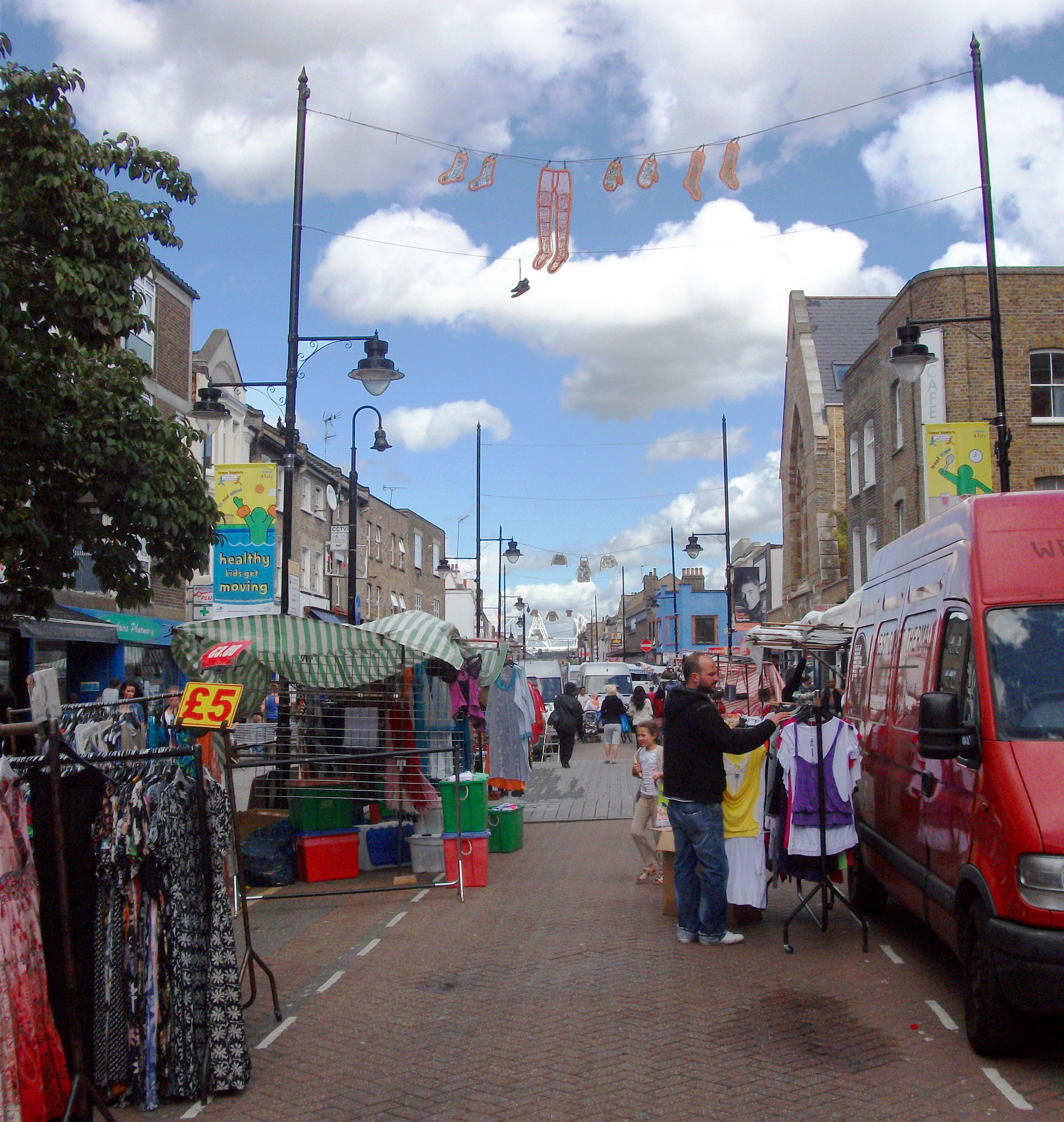
- Roman Road Market on market day.
- Location: Roman Road, Bow, Tower Hamlets, Greater London
- Opening date: 1843
- Management: Tower Hamlets London Borough Council
- Owner: Tower Hamlets London Borough Council
- Environment: Street
- Goods sold: General goods
- Days normally open: Tuesdays, Thursdays and Saturdays
- Website: http://romanroadlondon.com/
- Interactive map of Roman Road, London

Roman Road Market is a historical marketplace and is the town centre of Bow, it is in East London, England, and a part of the London Borough of Tower Hamlets and take it namesake from the wider road between Bethnal Green and Bow. located at the road eastern end is referred to as Roman or The Roman which is next to Bow and these terms can also apply to the surrounding streets. Both the area and the road was famously taken by Boudicea from Camulodunum (modern Colchester) on her way to burn the Roman Empire in Londinium (modern City of London) and is one of the oldest known trade route in Britain while there has been a market for at least over 150 years.

=== History ===
As roads were built, housing, trades and manufacturing, most famously the Bryant and May Match Factory, developed quickly. With housing and Industry came the need for the essentials of life, and costermongers started selling their wares, people used their front rooms to sell goods and shops lined the Roman Road. A main shopping street evolved and the Roman Road Market which grew probably as early as 1843 in Stratford-at-Bow, when it was illegal 'but withstood several attempts to close it down'. It was certainly recorded as a fully fledged market in 1887 by Booth, who toured the area with the local policeman and reported that 'Roman Road...is one of the great market streets in London. Things to be bought of every sort, even patent leather shoes. Some demand for good quality as well as for cheapness'. The market is the heart of Bow, and 'going down the Roman' has been a tradition for generations.

The market was open long hours: there are oral accounts of trading going on until 10 pm well into the 20th century. Market days are Tuesdays, Thursdays and Saturdays, but retail shops are open all week. Old Ford and Bow Traders and Shopkeepers Union was inaugurated in 1910 to promote the welfare of costermongers and traders as well as those they lived alongside, and there have been traders groups since then.

The growth of traffic led to the council in 1959 trying to divert street trading to a new market off Roman Road. It met the same kind of resistance as the earlier attempt to promote Columbia Market.

The Roman Road Market was designated a Conservation Area in 1989, and extended in 2008 in recognition of its historic significance and special character as a traditional East End market.

=== Shops ===
Shops on Roman Road have included Woolworths and Presto, and smaller shops such as Millett, Sid Short's Oil and Paint Shop, and Cohen the tailors. There are many stallholders who made their mark including the "Banana Man".

Number 526 Roman Road has been a pie and mash shop since the 1920s. It was taken on in 1939 by George Kelly, from the Kelly Pie and Mash dynasty which had shops throughout London.
