= The Widow's Son, London =

Pub in Bromley-by-Bow, London

Coordinates: 51.522249°N 0.018008°W

The Widow's Son
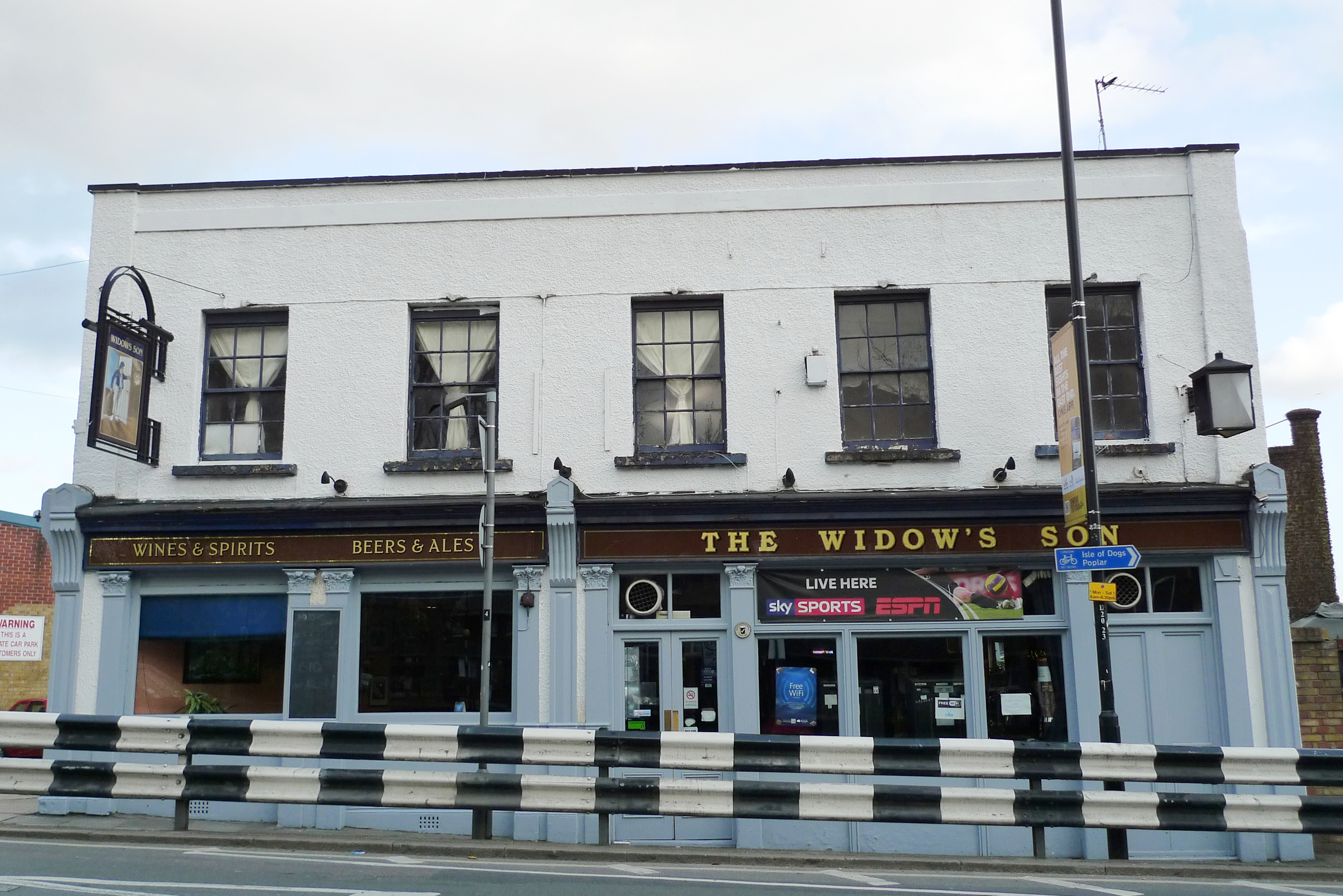
- The Widow's Son
- Interactive map of The Widow's Son
- Location: Bromley-by-Bow, London, England

History
- Built: 1848

Listed Building – Grade II*
- Type: English Heritage

Royal Navy sailor Alan Beckett places the bun on Good Friday, 4 April 1958

The Widow's Son is a Grade II* listed public house at 75 Devons Road, in Bromley-by-Bow, East London. It was built in the early 19th century, possibly 1848, and the existing building is supposedly on the site of an old widow's cottage.

Known locally as "Bun House", the pub has been host to a Good Friday tradition of storing hot cross buns in a net hanging over the bar.

== The Widow's Buns ==
Every year on Good Friday, the tradition of the Widow's Buns is celebrated. The legend is that the old widow's only son left to go to sea, possibly during the Napoleonic Wars, and wrote to her explaining that he would be returning home at Easter and to have a nice hot cross bun waiting for him. He never returned, but his mother continued to keep a fresh hot cross bun every Good Friday for the rest of her life. After her death, a huge collection of hot cross buns was discovered in a net hanging from the ceiling of her cottage.

More considered accounts take the view that the specific story of the widow and her son is unlikely to be true, as the underlying custom of a belief in the special properties of buns baked on Good Friday was widespread in the 18th and 19th centuries. From at least as early as the mid-18th century, "Good Friday bread" was thought to have medicinal or curative properties, and hardened over the months or years, could be grated into food to help digestive or bowel problems.

In 1848, the public house that was built upon the site of her cottage was named in honour of the tradition she had created. It is locally known as the Bun House. The tradition has continued ever since, with a sailor from the Royal Navy placing a new bun in the net hanging above the bar each year. The practice may have been based upon the belief that hot cross buns baked on Good Friday would never decay.

For some years the annual bun has been specially baked by Mr Bunn of Mr Bunn's Bakery, Chadwell Heath. A fire in the pub in the 1980s burnt many of the old buns in the net, but even their remnants are included in the net as a memento of that fire.

In 2013, it was noted by a local newspaper that 93-year-old Patrick Hines, who was born opposite the pub, has visited every Good Friday for nearly 70 years.

The pub was closed for some years and re-opened 2024. Representatives from the Royal Navy visited Easter 2025 to continue the bun tradition. Whilst the pub had been closed, ceremony was instead carried out at the Queens Head in Limehouse.

A comparable tradition of nailing buns to the ceiling on Good Friday exists at the Bell Inn at Horndon-on-the-Hill in Essex.

== Possible redevelopment ==
In March 2012, Punch Taverns sold the property to Dalco Developments who proposed to close the pub and redevelop the site. In May 2013, planning permission for the "development of a second floor 5x bedroom flat above existing Grade II* Listed Widows Son Public House; alterations to the existing building; and development of new three storey 2 x 4 bed houses in adjacent Public House beer garden" was refused.

In 2016, new plans were submitted – not to redevelop the pub itself, but to erect terraced houses in the space presently used as the pub car-park and beer garden.

The pub was closed for a year and reopened early in 2017.
