= Trinity Green Almshouses =

Almshouses in London Borough of Tower Hamlets

Coordinates: 51.5208°N 0.0548°W

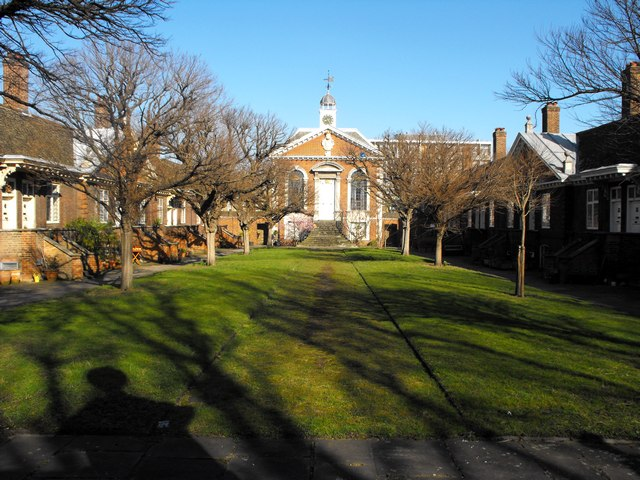
Almshouses at Trinity Green.

Trinity Green Almshouses (formerly Trinity Hospital) are a series of Grade I listed almshouses on Mile End Road in Whitechapel in London. They were originally built in 1695 to provide housing for retired sailors, and are possibly the 2nd oldest almshouses in Central London, The Charterhouse, founded by Thomas Sutton in 1611 being the oldest. The buildings were damaged during the Second World War, and were restored in the 1950s by London County Council.

== History ==
The Trinity Green Almshouses were built in 1695 by the Corporation of Trinity House to provide housing for "28 decay’d Masters & Commanders of Ships or ye Widows of such"; the land was given to the corporation by Captain Henry Mudd of Ratcliffe. The almshouses are believed to have been designed by Sir William Ogbourne, (Note: Some sources say that the architect was Sir Christopher Wren.) and the houses were organised into two rows, with a central green and chapel. The chapel is in the parish of St Dunstan's, Stepney.

In 1735, Trinity Green had 28 people, at a cost of 12 shillings per resident per month. In 1895–96, Trinity Green was threatened with closure, after Sir Frederic Leighton proposed that the almshouses be destroyed. The closure was prevented due to a public campaign led by Charles Robert Ashbee, who set up a Committee for the Survey of the Memorials of Greater London. The almshouses were the first buildings to be put on his preservation register, which eventually became the listed building system.

In 1927, a bronze bust memorial for William Booth was installed at Trinity Green; in the 19th century, Booth had preached in the Vine Tavern in front of the almshouses, which had led to the founding of The Salvation Army. In the Second World War, the Trinity Green almshouses were damaged, with those almshouses north of the chapel being destroyed. In 1950, Trinity Green became a Grade I listed building; the listing included the almshouses, chapel, gates, railings and walls. In 1954, London County Council bought and restored the non-destroyed houses, including the restoration of the chapel with 18th-century panelling from Bradmore House in Hammersmith. When Mile End Road was built, Trinity Green's location was altered from rural peace and quiet into traffic.

Trinity Green was included on a Mile End mural created in 2011. In 2016, local residents complained at proposals for Sainsbury's to build a 28-storey tower block less than 80 yards (73 m) from the Trinity Green almshouses; they argued that the tower block would cast a shadow over the almshouses.
