= Sidney (given name) =

- Pronunciation: /ˈsidni/
- Gender: Unisex
- Language: English

Origin
- Language: Old English
- Origin: Sidney (surname)
- Meaning: "wide water meadow"
- Region of origin: England

Other names
- Variant forms: Sydney; Sydnee; Sidnei; Sidny; Sidnie
- Short form: Sid
- Related names: Sidy

Sidney (often shortened to Sid) is an English given name derived from the surname, which itself has two different derivations depending on the origins of the family: in some cases a place name, itself from Old English, meaning "wide water meadow", and in others from the French place name "St. Denis".

Sidney became widely used as a given name in English-speaking countries during the 19th century. It was popularised in the United States after the American Revolution due to admiration for the English politician Algernon Sidney as a martyr to royal tyranny; since its peak in the 1910s its usage has declined steadily. Sidney was used as a woman's name in the 1700s and 1800s, such as Sidney Kennon, Sidney Griffith, and Sidney Browne (born 1850). From the early 1990s to the 2000s, the name Sidney was a fashionable name given to girls. Sydney is a spelling variant of the name used by men and women; other variants include Cydney and Cidney.

== People ==
Notable people with the given name include:

- Sidney Abrahams (1885–1957), British long jumper
- Sydney Affolter (born 2003), American former basketball player
- Sidney Alford (1935–2021), English inventor and explosives engineer
- Sidney Barnard (1914–1999), English footballer
- Sidney Barthelemy (born 1942), American politician
- Sidney Bartlett (1799–1889), American lawyer and politician
- Sidney H. Beard (1862–1938), English vegetarian activist
- Sidney Burr Beardsley (1823–1890), justice of the Connecticut Supreme Court
- Sidney Bechet (1897–1959), American jazz saxophonist, clarinetist, and composer
- Sidney Beckerman (musician) (1919–2007), Klezmer clarinet player
- Sidney Beckerman (film producer) (1920–2008), American film producer
- Sidney Bento (born 1974), Brazilian footballer
- Sidney E. Berger (born 1944), American historian
- Sidney J. van den Bergh (1898–1977), Dutch politician and businessman
- Sidney van den Bergh (born 1929), Canadian astronomer
- Sidney Bergmann (born 1905), Austrian wrestler
- Sidney Bernstein, Baron Bernstein (1899–1993), British businessman and media executive
- Sidney Norman Bernstein (1911–1992), American chess player
- Sidney Bryan Berry (1926–2013), US Army general officer
- Sidney Bowman (1907–1986), American triple jumper
- Dame Sidney Browne GBE, RRC (1850–1941), first Matron-in-Chief of the Queen Alexandra's Imperial Military Nursing Service and founding President of the Royal College of Nursing
- Sidny Lopes Cabral (born 2003), Dutch footballer
- Sid Caesar (1922–2014), actor and comedian
- Sidney Carroll (1913–1988), American film and television scriptwriter
- Sidney Chu (born 1999), Hong Kong short track speed skater
- Sidney Robertson Cowell (1903–1995), American ethnomusicologist
- Sidnie White Crawford (born 1960), American professor of classics and religion
- Sidney Crosby (born 1987), Canadian ice hockey player
- Sidney H. Chang (1934–2016), Chinese-American historian, author, and academic
- Sidney Cooke (born 1927), serial killer and leader of the "Dirty Dozen"
- Sidney Dawson (1893–19??), English footballer
- Sidney Dearing (1870–1953), American businessperson
- Sidney Duteil (born 1955), French musician and television and radio host
- Sidney Easton (1885–1971), American actor, playwright and composer
- Sid Eudy, professional wrestler known as "Sycho" Sid Vicious/Justice
- Sidney Fox (1907–1942), American stage and film actress
- Sidny Feitosa dos Santos (born 1981), Brazilian footballer
- Sid Field (1904–1950), English comedy entertainer
- Sidney Robert Freshwater (1919–2019), Australian cycling administrator
- Sid Gepford (1895–1924), American football halfback
- Sid Gillman (1911–2003), American football player and coach
- Sidney Leslie Goodwin (1910–1912), English child who perished in the Titanic disaster
- Sidney Gordin (1918–1996), Russian-born American artist, professor
- Sid Gordon (1917–1975), American major league baseball All-Star player
- Sidney Govou (born 1979), French football player
- Sidney Griffith (died 1752), Welsh Methodist of the 18th century revival
- Sid Hadden (1877–1934), English cricketer
- Sidney Hauser, American saxophonist
- Sidney Hertzberg (1922–2005), American pro basketball player
- Sidney Mttron Hirsch (1884–1962), American model and playwright
- Sidney Holland (1893–1961), New Zealand Prime Minister
- Sidney Homer (1864–1953), American composer
- Sidney William Jackson (1873–1946), Australian ornithologist
- Sid James (1913–1976), South African-born English film and television actor
- Sidney Jones (American football) (born 1995), American football player
- Sidney Kennon (died 1754), British midwife
- Sidney Kibrick (1928–2026), American child actor
- Sidney Knott (1933–2020), South African cricketer
- Sidney Korshak (1907–1996), American lawyer and "fixer" for organized crime
- Sidney W. Lane (died 1906), American politician from Maryland
- Sidney Lanier (1842–1881), American musician, poet and author
- Sidney Lee (1859–1926), English biographer, writer and critic
- Sid Luckman (1916–1998), American NFL Hall of Fame football player
- Sidney Lumet (1924–2011), American film director
- Sidney Lyon (1884–19??), American lawyer and state legislator
- Sidney Magal (born 1953), Brazilian singer and actor
- Sidnie Manton (1902–1979), British zoologist
- Sidney McKnight (born 1955), Canadian boxer
- Sid Meier (born 1954), game developer, famous for his Civilization series
- Sidney Meyers (1906–1969), American film director
- Sidney Mobell (1926–2022), American artist, jeweler, and philanthropist
- Sidney Moncrief (born 1957), American basketball player
- Sidney Moraes (born 1977), Brazilian footballer
- Sidney Morin (born 1995), American ice hockey player
- Sidney Myer (1878–1934), Australian businessman and philanthropist
- Sidney Nolan (1917–1992), Australian artist
- Sidney Arnold Pakeman (1891–1975), British soldier, professor and politician
- Sidney Phillips (1924–2015), American soldier and physician
- Sidney Pike (1858–1923), British painter
- Sidney Poitier (1927–2022), American actor
- Sidney Ponson (born 1976), Aruban baseball pitcher
- Sidney Powell (born 1955), American attorney
- Sidney Pullen (1895–c. 1950), English football (soccer) player
- Sidney Armor Reeve (1866–1941), American author and professor
- Sidney Rittenberg (1921–2019), American journalist
- Sidney Sheldon (1917–2007), American writer and producer
- Sidney Smith (Assyriologist) (1889–1979), assyriologist
- Sidney Smith (Canada West politician) (1823–1889), Canadian politician
- Sidney Smith (cartoonist) (1877–1935), American cartoonist
- Sidney Smith (cricketer) (1929–1985), English cricketer
- Sidney Smith (Illinois judge) (1829–1898)
- Sidney Smith (Royal Navy officer) (1764–1840), Royal Navy officer and politician
- Sidney Smith (snooker player) (1908–1990), English billiards and snooker player
- Sidney C. Smith Jr., American cardiologist and Professor of Medicine
- Sidney Earle Smith (1897–1959), Canadian academic and politician
- Sidney Irving Smith (1843–1926), American zoologist
- Sidney Lawton Smith (1845–1929), American designer, etcher, engraver, illustrator and bookplate artist
- Sidney Maynard Smith (1875–1928), British surgeon and freemason
- Sidney Oslin Smith Jr. (1923–2012), American judge
- Sidney R. J. Smith (1858–1913), British architect
- Sidney Smythe (1705–1778), English judge and politician
- Sidney Sonnino (1847–1922), Italian politician
- Sidney Souza (born 1972), Brazilian footballer
- Sidney Spencer (born 1985), American basketball player
- Sidney Tannenbaum (1925–1986), American basketball player
- Sid Terris (1904–1974), American lightweight boxer
- Sidney St. Felix Thaxter (1883–1958), justice of the Maine Supreme Judicial Court
- Sidney Topol (1924–2022), American innovator and entrepreneur
- Sidney Veysey (born 1955), Canadian ice hockey player
- Sidney W. Wernick (1913–1995), justice of the Maine Supreme Judicial Court
- Sidney Wicks (born 1949), American basketball player
- Sid Wilson (born 1977), American DJ, keyboardist and pianist

== Fictional characters ==
- Sidney Prescott, original protagonist in the Scream franchise
- Sidney (Ice Age), a ground sloth in the Ice Age film series
- Sid Jenkins (Sidney Jenkins), a character in the British teen drama Skins

== See also ==
- Sidney (disambiguation)
- Sidney (surname)
- Sydney (name)
