= Hirini =

Hirini is both a given name and surname. It is a Māori transliteration of the name Sydney or Sidney. Notable people with the name include:

== Given name ==
- Hirini Matunga, New Zealand planning academic
- Hirini Melbourne (1949–2003), Māori composer, singer, university lecturer, poet and author
- Hirini Moko Mead (1927–2026), New Zealand anthropologist and historian
- Hirini Rawiri Taiwhanga (c. 1832–1890), New Zealand politician
- Hirini Te Kani (died 1896), New Zealand tribal leader
- Hirini Te Rito Whaanga (1828–1905), New Zealand Mormon missionary
- Hirini Whaanga Christy (1883–1955), New Zealand Mormon leader

== Surname ==
- Luther Hirini (born 1996), New Zealand rugby union player
- Sarah Hirini (born 1992), New Zealand rugby union player
