= Syro-Anatolian =

Syro-Anatolian may refer to:

- someone or something related both to historical regions of Syria and Anatolia, like:
  - Syro-Anatolian states of the Iron Age - term for ancient Luwian and Aramean states during the Iron Age
- someone or something related to Syrian/Syriac presence or influence in Anatolia, like:
  - Syro-Anatolian Christianity - Christian communities of both Syriac Rites (eastern and western), in Anatolia

== See also ==
- Syria (disambiguation)
- Syrian (disambiguation)
- Syriac (disambiguation)
- Anatolia (disambiguation)
- Anatolian (disambiguation)
