= Valene L. Smith =

American anthropologist and geographer (1926–2024)

- Born: February 14, 1926; Spokane, Washington, U.S.
- Died: January 16, 2024 (aged 97)
- Occupations: Academic, educator, travel agent, and travel guide
- Spouses: 4

Academic background
- Education: University of California, Los Angeles (BA 1946; MA 1950); University of Utah (PHD 1966)
- Thesis: Kotzebue: A Modern Alaskan Eskimo Community (1966)

Academic work
- Discipline: Anthropology, geography
- Sub-discipline: Tourism studies
- Institutions: California State University, Chico (1967–1998)
- Notable works: Hosts and Guests: The Anthropology of Tourism (1977)
- Notable ideas: The "4 Hs of Tourism"

Valene Lucy Smith (February 14, 1926 – January 16, 2024) was an American anthropologist and geographer who is considered to be the founder of the field of tourism studies.

== Early life (1926–1966) ==
Smith was born in Spokane, Washington, on February 14, 1926, to Earnest and Lucy Blachly Smith. She was raised in a small apartment in Los Angeles. As a child and young adult, she traveled across the United States with her parents—usually just her mother in their Buick named "Lizzie"—visiting all 48 states by 1947. She obtained a bachelor of arts in geography from the University of California, Los Angeles in 1946. She then began teaching at the Los Angeles City College and obtained a masters degree from UCLA in 1950.

From 1950 to 1953, Smith traveled to Alaska and Europe, before teaching at the University of Peshawar in 1953 as a Fulbright Scholar. She continued traveling throughout the 1950s. In 1955, she led a student group on a two-month tour of Europe at the request of the Los Angeles Unified School District. She also planned an "Around the World in 80 Days Tour" in 1957, during which she and her tour group dined with Soong Mei-ling, the first lady of the Republic of China. In 1959, she opened a travel agency called Jet-Age Travel Service in Hollywood, Los Angeles. Smith earned a doctorate of anthropology from the University of Utah in 1966 while on a 15-month sabbatical, writing a dissertation about tourism's effects on indigenous people in Alaska.

== Professor of anthropology (1967–1998) ==
Smith was a professor at California State University, Chico from 1967 until her retirement in 1998. In 1974, she founded the field of tourism studies with a short note in the American Anthropological Association newsletter: "Is anyone else interested in the study of tourism?" After receiving 28 responses, she organized a symposium on tourism at the association's 1974 meeting in Mexico City. In 1977, Smith edited and published Hosts and Guests: The Anthropology of Tourism, a collection of essays presented at the symposium. Hosts and Guests (representing a binary between Global North and Global South) is considered a groundbreaking work in tourism studies and is regularly cited, critiqued, and used in teaching across disciplines. Smith published a second edition in 1989 and a third edition with Maryann Brent in 2001. She is also known for coining the "4 Hs of Tourism"—habitat, handicrafts, heritage, and history—which is used as a framework in tourism research.

== Personal life ==
Smith was married four times, with each marriage ending in her husband's death. In 1981, she was named Outstanding Professor in the California State University system. In 2010, the Museum of Anthropology at Chico State was named for her. She died on January 16, 2024, aged 97.

== Selected bibliography ==
- Smith, Valene L., ed. (1977). Hosts and Guests: The Anthropology of Tourism (1st ed.). Philadelphia: University of Pennsylvania Press. OCLC 1330252506.
- ———, ed. (1989). Hosts and Guests: The Anthropology of Tourism (2nd ed.). Philadelphia: University of Pennsylvania Press. ISBN 978-0-8122-1280-8.
- ———; Eadington, William R., eds. (1992). Tourism Alternatives: Potentials and Problems in the Development of Tourism. Philadelphia: University of Pennsylvania Press. ISBN 0-8122-1391-2. OCLC 25629190.
- ——— (January 1992). "Introduction: The Quest in Guest". Annals of Tourism Research. 19 (1): 1–17. doi:10.1016/0160-7383(92)90103-V.
- ——— (1996). "Indigenous Tourism: The 4 Hs". In Butler, Richard; Hinch, Tom (eds.). Tourism and Indigenous Peoples. London: International Thomson Business Press. pp. 283–307. ISBN 0-4151-2529-4.
- ——— (January 1998). "War and Tourism: An American Ethnography". Annals of Tourism Research. 25 (1): 202–227. doi:10.1016/S0160-7383(97)00086-8.
- ———; Brent, Maryann, eds. (2011). Hosts and Guests Revisited: Tourism Issues of the 21st Century. Tourism Dynamics. Elmsford, New York: Cognizant Communication Corporation. ISBN 978-1-8823-4528-1.
- ——— (2015). Stereopticon: Entry to a Life of Travel and Tourism Research. Tourism Dynamics. Putnam Valley, New York: Cognizant Communication Corporation. ISBN 978-1-8823-4567-0.

== Sources ==
=== Book chapters ===
- Kaaristo, Maarja (2018). "Engaging with the Hosts and Guests: Some Methodological Reflections on the Anthropology of Tourism". In Owsianowska, Sabina; Banaszkiewicz, Magdalena (eds.). Anthropology of Tourism in Central and Eastern Europe: Bridging Worlds. Anthropology of Tourism: Heritage, Mobility, and Society. Lanham, Md.: Lexington Books. pp. 71–88. ISBN 978-1-4985-4381-1.
- Leite, Naomi; Graburn, Nelson (2009). "Anthropological Interventions in Tourism Studies". In Jamal, Tazim; Robinson, Mike (eds.). The Sage Handbook of Tourism Studies. London: Sage Publishing. pp. 35–64. ISBN 978-1-4129-2397-2.

=== Journal articles ===
- Adams, Kathleen M. (2024). Mostafanezhad, Mary; Cheer, Joseph M. (eds.). "Valene Smith, Tourism, and the Remapping of Anthropological Terrain". Special Section: Valene Smith. Tourism Geographies. 26 (4): 695–699. doi:10.1080/14616688.2024.2342467.
- Di Giovine, Michael A. (2024). Mostafanezhad, Mary; Cheer, Joseph M. (eds.). "Honoring Valene Smith, Our Prescient Foremother". Special Section: Valene Smith. Tourism Geographies. 26 (4): 700–704. doi:10.1080/14616688.2024.2342469.
- Mostafanezhad, Mary; Cheer, Joseph (2024). Mostafanezhad, Mary; Cheer, Joseph M. (eds.). "Remembering Hosts and Guests: A Tribute to Valene Smith (1926–2024)". Special Section: Valene Smith. Tourism Geographies. 26 (4): 687–689. doi:10.1080/14616688.2024.2394668.
- Nitzky, William (2024). Mostafanezhad, Mary; Cheer, Joseph M. (eds.). "Honoring a Legend: Dr. Valene L. Smith". Special Section: Valene Smith. Tourism Geographies. 26 (4): 709–716. doi:10.1080/14616688.2024.2365709.
- Sherlock, Kirsty (December 2001). "Revisiting the Concept of Hosts and Guests". Tourist Studies. 1 (3): 271–295. doi:10.1177/146879760100100304. ISSN 1468-7976.
- Stone, Matthew J.; Coon, Jackie (2017). "Always a Traveller: A Portrait of Valene L. Smith". Anatolia. 28 (2): 299–305. Bibcode:2017Anato..28..299S. doi:10.1080/13032917.2016.1273168.
- Swain, Margaret Byrne (2024). Mostafanezhad, Mary; Cheer, Joseph M. (eds.). "Indexing Valene Smith's Contributions to the Anthropology of Tourism and Tourism Studies". Special Section: Valene Smith. Tourism Geographies. 26 (4): 690–694. doi:10.1080/14616688.2024.2342463.

=== Websites ===
- "Obituary for Dr. Valene L. Smith". Valene L. Smith Museum of Anthropology. Archived from the original on July 12, 2024.
- Wallace, Tim (February 7, 2024). "In Memoriam: Valene L. Smith". Society for Applied Anthropology. Archived from the original on December 1, 2024.
