= Thyne =

Thyne may refer to:

- Thyne, an older name for Tuna el-Gebel, a necropolis in Al Minya Governorate, Egypt
- Turbonilla thyne, species of sea snail

== People with the surname ==
- Bob Thyne (1920–1986), Scottish footballer
- Clayton Thyne, American political scientist and academic administrator
- Maree Thyne, New Zealand professor of marketing
- T. J. Thyne (born 1975), American actor
