= Alison McIntosh =

New Zealand tourism and hospitality academic

Alison J. McIntosh is a New Zealand tourism and hospitality academic. Previously a professor at the University of Waikato, she is now a professor at Auckland University of Technology. Her research areas include Critical Tourism and Hospitality, Tourist Behaviour and Heritage and Cultural Tourism.

== Selected works ==
- McIntosh, Alison J., and Richard C. Prentice. "Affirming authenticity: Consuming cultural heritage." Annals of Tourism Research 26.3 (1999): 589–612.
- Cockburn-Wootten, C., Alison J. McIntosh, Kim Smith and Sharon Jefferies. "Communicating across tourism silos for inclusive sustainable partnerships." Journal of Sustainable Tourism 26.9 (2018): 1483–1498.
- McIntosh, Alison J., and Anne Zahra. "A cultural encounter through volunteer tourism: Towards the ideals of sustainable tourism?." Journal of Sustainable Tourism 15.5 (2007): 541–556.
- Mcintosh, Alison J., and Anna Siggs. "An exploration of the experiential nature of boutique accommodation." Journal of Travel Research 44.1 (2005): 74–81.
