= Cydney =

Cydney is a given name. Notable people with the given name include:

- Cydney Clanton (born 1989), American golfer
- Cydney Gillon, American figure and fitness competitor

== See also ==
- Sydney (name), another given name
