= Marta Weigle =

American anthropologist and folklorist (1944–2018)

- Born: 3 July 1944; Janesville, Wisconsin
- Died: 14 June 2018 (aged 73); Santa Fe

Academic background
- Education: Harvard University, University of Pennsylvania

Academic work
- Discipline: Anthropology; Folklore
- Institutions: University of New Mexico

Marta Weigle (July 3, 1944 – June 14, 2018) was an American anthropologist and folklorist.

== Early life and education ==
Weigle was born in Janesville, Wisconsin in 1944. The family moved to Santa Fe in 1961 so her father, Richard Weigle, who was president of St. John's College of Annapolis, could establish a new campus in Santa Fe. Weigle received a BA in Social Relations from Harvard (Radcliffe College) in 1965 and continued with graduate study in Folklore at the University of Pennsylvania.

== Career ==
Weigle earned her doctorate from the University of Pennsylvania in 1971, and began teaching English and anthropology at the University of New Mexico the next year. From 1982, Weigle also taught American studies, and chaired the department from 1984-1993. In 1990, she was appointed a University Regents Professor in the anthropology department. Weigle chaired the department from 1995 to 2002. She was the first gay woman to be appointed to these positions. She retired in 2011.

Along with Mari Lyn Salvador, then curator of the Maxwell Museum of Anthropology, Weigle founded the Alfonso Ortiz Center for Intercultural Studies at the University of New Mexico, winning a National Endowment for the Humanities Challenge Grant in 1999. The Ortiz Center aims to "create enduring partnerships and collaborations that address community-driven priorities through public-facing anthropology and humanities initiatives."

In 1981, with Mary Powell, Weigle established Ancient City Press, which published on the American West and Southwest until 2005. Weigle served on the board of the American Folklore Society from 1984 to 1986.

Weigle's personal journals and correspondence are held at the University of New Mexico Center for Southwest Research & Special Collections, while the Fray Angélico Chávez History Library at the New Mexico History Museum holds her academic papers.

== Awards and honours ==
In 2005 Weigle was the recipient of the inaugural State Historian’s Award for Excellence in New Mexico Heritage Scholarship from the New Mexico Historical Preservation Division. In 2010, Weigle, Frances Levine and Louise Stiver received an Award of Merit from the American Association for State and Local History Leadership in History Award for 'Telling New Mexico: A New History'. In 1977 Weigle received the Zia Award from the New Mexico Press Women.

Weigle was elected to the fellows of the American Folklore Society in 1987.

== Select publications ==
- Weigle, M. (2016). Creation and procreation: Feminist reflections on mythologies of cosmogony and parturition. University of Pennsylvania Press.
- Weigle M., Levine F. & Stiver L. (2009). Telling New Mexico: a new history. Museum of New Mexico Press.
- Weigle, M., & White, P. (2003). The Lore of New Mexico. University of New Mexico Press.
- Weigle, M., & Babcock, B. A. (Eds.). (1996). The Great Southwest of the Fred Harvey Company and the Santa Fe Railway. Heard Museum.
- Weigle, M. (1989). From desert to Disney world: The Santa Fe railway and the Fred Harvey company display the Indian southwest. Journal of Anthropological Research, 45(1), 115-137.
- Weigle M. & Fiore K. (1982). Santa fe and taos: the writer's era 1916-1941. Ancient City Press.
- Weigle, M. (1982). Spiders & spinsters: Women and mythology. University of New Mexico Press.
- Weigle M. (1976). Brothers of light brothers of blood: the penitentes of the southwest. University of New Mexico Press.
