= Anatolia (disambiguation) =

Anatolia, also known as Asia Minor, is the peninsular region between the Black Sea in the north and Mediterranean Sea in the south.

Anatolia may also refer to:

- Anatolia Eyalet, a former Ottoman province
- Anatolic Theme, a former Byzantine province
- Anatolian Plateau, a plateau in Turkey
- Anatolian Plate, a tectonic plate
- Anatolia (journal), academic journal in the field of tourism and hospitality
- Anatolia (album), a 1997 album by Mezarkabul
- Anatolia College in Merzifon, former name of the Anatolia College of Thessaloniki
- Anatolia College, private non-profit educational institution in Thessaloniki
- Fire of Anatolia, a Turkish dance group
- Saint Anatolia (died 250AD), a Christian martyr
- Anatolia (Rancho Cordova), a colloquial name for the large cluster of newer residential neighborhoods covering the southeastern portion of Rancho Cordova, California, including the master-planned community of the same name

== See also ==
- Classical Anatolia, an article about Ancient history of Asia Minor
- Eastern Anatolia region, a region in Turkey
- Central Anatolia Region, a region in Turkey
- Southeastern Anatolia Region, a region in Turkey
- Anadolu (disambiguation)
- Anatolian (disambiguation)
- Santa Anatolia (disambiguation)
