= Travel and Tourism Research Association =

Association of travel and tourism researchers

- Abbreviation: TTRA
- Formation: 1970
- Type: Professional association
- Headquarters: Lapeer, Michigan, United States
- Website: ttra.com

The Travel and Tourism Research Association (TTRA) is an association of researchers, educators and industry practitioners working in travel and tourism research. Formed in 1970, it holds an annual international conference and presents awards for research in the field. The Journal of Travel Research is published by Sage in association with TTRA.

== History ==
TTRA was formed in 1970 through the affiliation of two existing organizations: the Travel Research Association, founded in 1956 and based mainly in New York, and the Western Council for Travel Research, whose members included directors of university bureaus of economic and business research, state highway directors and state travel offices. Each had about 150 members.

The combined body initially operated as two councils, one eastern and one western, under a common name. The councils transferred their assets to the new organization at the 1971 conference, and in 1972 the merger was completed and the organization adopted its present name. Its first headquarters was housed in the Bureau of Economic and Business Research at the University of Utah in Salt Lake City, where it remained for 23 years. The former eastern council continued as the association's New York chapter, and Canadian members formed a Canada chapter. The association's office is now in Lapeer, Michigan.

== Activities ==
=== Conferences ===
TTRA has held an annual international conference since 1970, when the first meeting took place in Monterey, California. Most conferences have been held in the United States and Canada, with others in Mexico (1995), Ireland (2006 and 2025), Belgium (2014) and Australia (2019). The 2020 conference was cancelled during the COVID-19 pandemic and the 2021 conference was held online.

=== Publications ===
In addition to the Journal of Travel Research, publications that TTRA has supported over its history include Tourism Analysis and the Journal of Hospitality & Tourism Research.

== Awards ==
TTRA presents awards to academic and practitioner researchers. They include the Lifetime Achievement Award, which the association describes as its highest honor; the Distinguished Researcher Award; the J. Desmond Slattery Award, which supports a master's or doctoral student's thesis or dissertation; the Keeling Award for a completed doctoral dissertation; and the MMGY Shifflet Award for Research Excellence, a practitioner award.

=== Charles R. Goeldner Article of Excellence Award ===
The Charles R. Goeldner Article of Excellence Award recognizes the most significant article published in the Journal of Travel Research in the preceding year. The recipient is selected by the journal's editor and a committee, and no application is required.

In 2026 the award was presented for two articles. Recipients include the following, listed by year of presentation:

Year	Article	Authors
2026	"On the Importance of Field Studies for Testing Theory-Driven Behavioral Change Interventions in (Sustainable) Tourism"	Emil Juvan, Oscar Yuheng Zhu, Bettina Grün and Sara Dolnicar
2026	"Reducing Shower Duration in Tourist Accommodations: A Covert True Experiment of Continuous Real-Time Eco-Feedback and Persuasive Messaging"	Pablo Pereira-Doel, Xavier Font, Kayleigh Wyles and Jorge Pereira-Moliner
2025		Graham Miller, Gloria Crabolu and Xavier Font
2024	"Tourism and Troubles: Effects of Security Threats on the Global Travel and Tourism Industry Performance"	Raphael K. Akamavi, Fahad Ibrahim and Raymond Swaray
2021	"Personifying Destinations: A Personal Values Approach"	Sheng Ye, Julie A. Lee, Joanne N. Sneddon and Geoffrey N. Soutar
2019		Jungkeun Kim
2016		Sara Dolnicar
2013	"Identifying and Ranking the Determinants of Tourism Performance"	A. George Assaf and Alexander Josiassen
2012		Geoffrey I. Crouch
2007	"Destination Personality: An Application of Brand Personality to Tourism Destinations"	Yüksel Ekinci and Sameer Hosany

== See also ==
- Journal of Travel Research
- International Association of Scientific Experts in Tourism
- Tourism
