= International Association of Scientific Experts in Tourism =

The International Association of Scientific Experts in Tourism (AIEST, Association internationale d'experts scientifiques du tourisme ) is an international organisation of scientific and practical experts in tourism. It was founded in 1951. The proceedings of its annual conference have been published in journals including Journal of Travel Research and Anatolia.

It published the journal Tourism Review until 2016. The journal is now published by Emerald.

== See also ==
- Travel and Tourism Research Association
