= Sara Dolnicar =

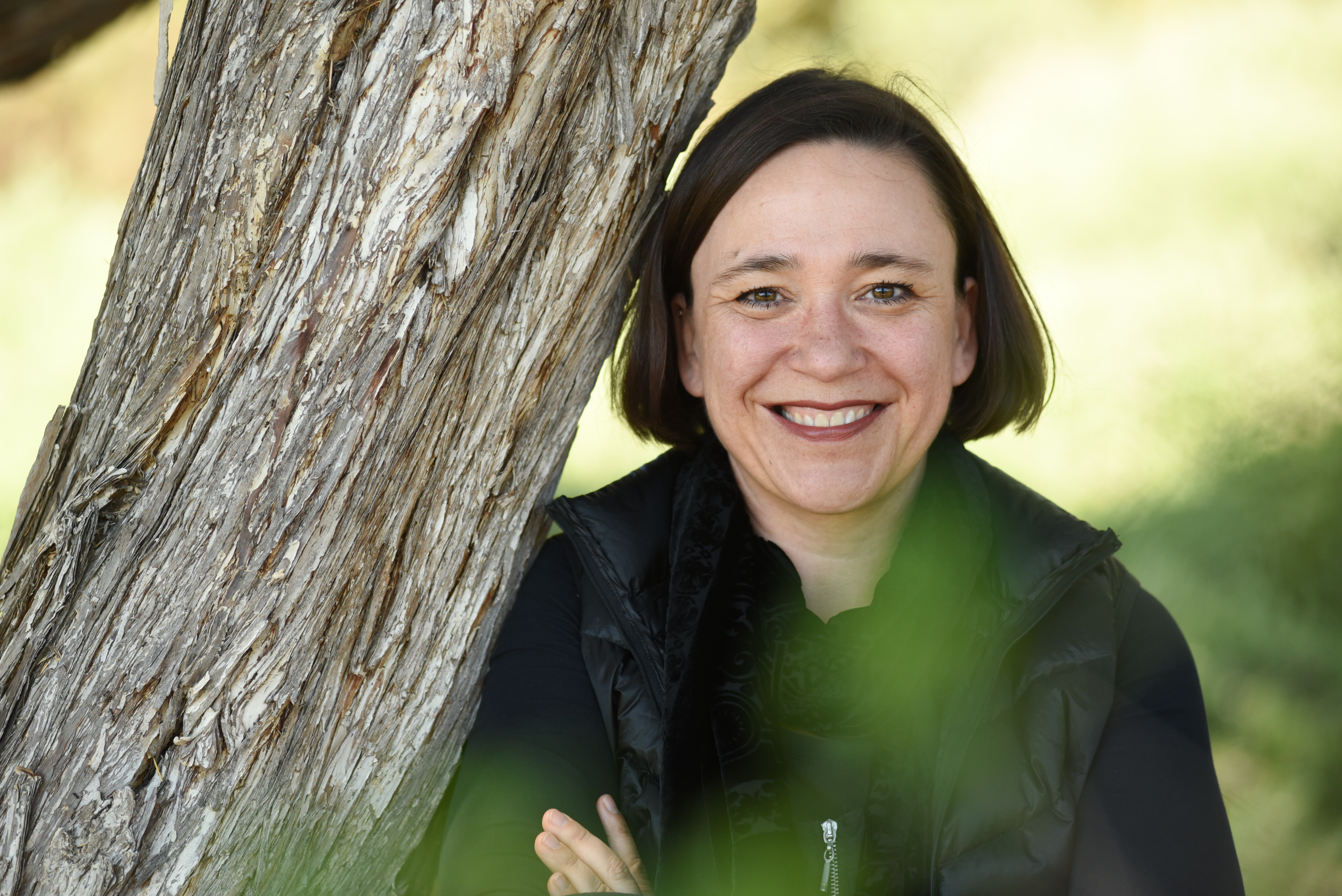
Dolnicar in 2018

Sara Dolnicar FASSA is an Austrian behavioural scientist who researches market segmentation methodology, sustainable tourism, public acceptance of recycled water, and a range of social marketing questions, such as how to identify and attract high-quality foster carers. Since 2013, she has been a research professor of tourism at The University of Queensland in Brisbane, Australia. She has been recognised by the Republic of Slovenia for her research achievements.

== Career ==
Dolnicar worked at the Vienna University of Economics and Business (WU Wien) Institute for Tourism and Leisure Studies on short-term contracts during her Ph.D. and psychology degree. From 1998 to 2002 she was a researcher in a Centre of Excellence funded by the FWF (the Austrian research funding body) on a half-time fixed-term contract, as well as working in administrative roles, including serving as the Secretary General of the Austrian Society for Applied Research in Tourism.

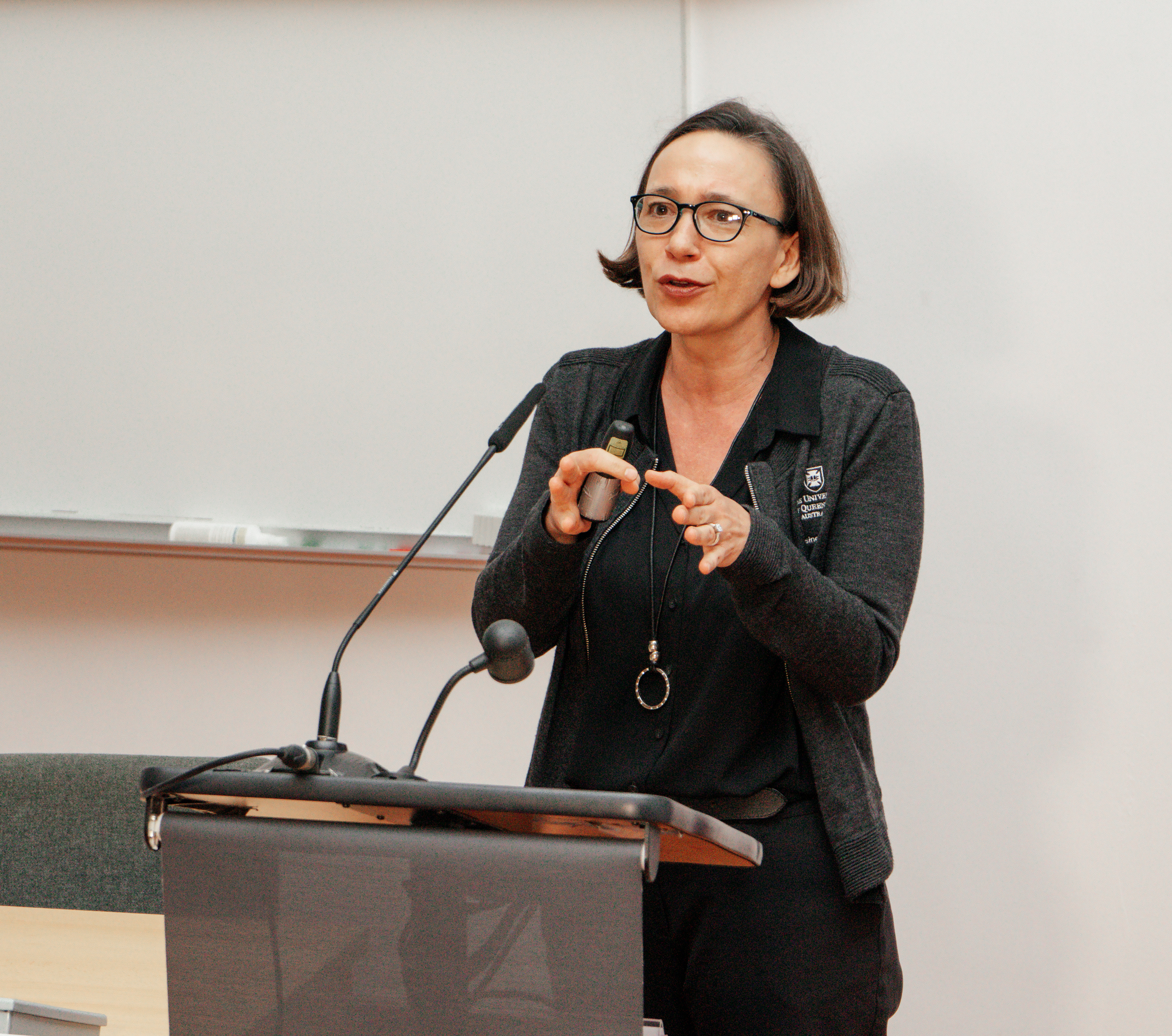
Dolnicar delivering a keynote presentation in Portoroz, Slovenia in May 2022

Dolnicar took up a full-time teaching/research academic position in 2002 as a Senior Lecturer in the School of Management and Marketing at the University of Wollongong, Australia, and became a full professor relatively young in 2006. She served two terms as the Associate Dean (Research) in Commerce and was the Founding Director of the Institute for Innovation in Business and Social Research. She has received over AUD$4 million in funding, and was awarded an Australian Research Council Queen Elizabeth II Fellowship of AUD$1.46 million in 2010 to research market segmentation, the highest of any ARC Discovery Scheme grant that year. In 2011, UOW's tourism research, including Dolnicar's, received a 5 rating from the ARC, the only for tourism research in Australia. She was on the board of Tourism Wollongong. In 2013 she became a research professor at The University of Queensland in the then School of Tourism. She was awarded an Australian Research Council Laureate Fellowship in 2019.

Dolnicar's research has contributed to the improvement of market segmentation methodology, measures in the social sciences, and the development and testing of measures to improve the environmental sustainability of tourism. In August 2017, she did a TEDxUQ talk on her sustainable tourism research. Dolnicar also researches public perceptions and acceptance of water conservation and water from alternative sources such as recycled water, including media inaccuracy and bias. She has also studied attracting high-quality foster carers, and researched how to restore tourism to areas hit by disasters, by identifying "resilient travellers". She has studied attendance of lectures by undergraduate students.

Since 2018 she is Co-Editor-in-Chief of the journal Annals of Tourism Research. Her h-index is 89. In 2020 Dolnicar commenced her Australian Research Council Laureate Fellowship five-year program of research into Low Harm Hedonism.

=== Recognition ===
Dolnicar is an elected fellow of three societies for tourism researchers, the International Academy for the Study of Tourism in 2013, the International Association of Scientific Experts in Tourism (AIEST), and the Council for Australasian Tourism and Hospitality Education (CAUTHE). She has won a number of awards, including the Charles R. Goeldner Article of Excellence Award for the best paper published in the preceding year in the Journal of Travel Research (in 2004 and 2016), the UQ Excellence in Research Supervision award (2017), the Travel and Tourism Research Association's Distinguished Researcher Award recognising Dolnicar as a valuable resource in the tourism research community (2017), the Association of Children's Welfare Agencies (ACWA) Service Partnership Award and the University of Wollongong Research Excellence Award for Senior Researcher.

Dolnicar received the Ambassador of Science Award of the Republic of Slovenia at an award ceremony held on 21 November 2016 in the country's capital and Dolnicar's birthplace, Ljubljana. The Ambassador of Science award is the highest national prize the Republic of Slovenia awards to expatriate native Slovenian researchers in recognition of their global research excellence, the high impact of their work as well as their active engagement in international knowledge transfer.

In 2019, Dolnicar was elected Fellow of the Academy of the Social Sciences in Australia.

In 2021, Dolnicar's research team - The Low Harm Hedonism Initiative - were awarded the CETT Alimara 'Through Research' award for their work promoting pro-environmental action.

She was a finalist for the Eureka Prize in the Outstanding Mentor of Young Researchers category in 2021 and 2022.

=== Research contribution to UN SDGs ===
Goal 12: Responsible Consumption and Production

As a researcher, Dolnicar is contributing to the United Nations Sustainable Development Goals (SDGs). Her work, and that of her ‘Low Harm Hedonism’ research team, contributes principally to Goal 12: Responsible Consumption and production and also to Goals 6, 8,10,11,13, and 17. Details at The Global Academy

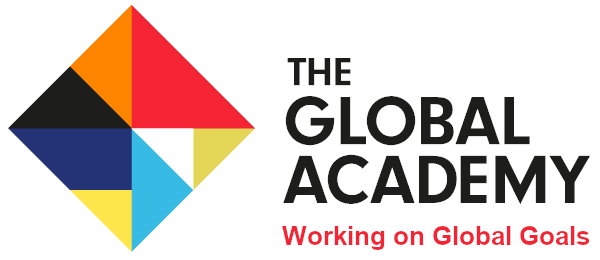
Researcher page at The Global Academy

Under Goal 12 Dolnicar's research is helping to achieve the following targets:

- Target 12.3 By 2030, halve per capita global food waste at the retail and consumer levels and reduce food losses along production and supply chains, including post-harvest losses, and
- Target 12.5 By 2030, substantially reduce waste generation through prevention, reduction, recycling and reuse

=== Selected work ===
- Dolnicar, S. (2021) Airbnb before, during and after COVID-19. The University of Queensland. OPEN ACCESS
- Dolnicar, S. (2018) Peer-to-Peer Accommodation Networks: Pushing the boundaries. Oxford: Goodfellow Publishers. OPEN ACCESS
- Dolnicar, S., Grün, B. & Leisch, F. (2018) Market Segmentation Analysis: Understanding It, Doing It, and Making It Useful. New York: Springer. OPEN ACCESS
- Juvan, E. & Dolnicar, S. (2014) The Attitude-Behaviour Gap in Sustainable Tourism. Annals of Tourism Research, 48:76-95.
- Dolnicar, S., Hurlimann, A. & Grün, B. (2014) Branding Water. Water Research, 57: 325–338.
- Dolnicar, S., Grün, B., Leisch, F. & Schmidt, K. (2014) Required Sample Sizes for Data-Driven Market Segmentation Analyses in Tourism. Journal of Travel Research, 53(3): 296–306.
- Dolnicar, S. & Grün, B. (2013) Validly Measuring Destination Images in Survey Studies. Journal of Travel Research, 52(1): 3–13.
- Hurlimann, A. & Dolnicar, S. (2010) When Public Opposition Defeats Alternative Water Projects - the Case of Toowoomba Australia. Water Research, 44: 287–297.
- Dolnicar, S. & Rossiter, J.R. (2008) The Low Stability of Brand-Attribute Associations is Partly Due to Measurement Factors. International Journal of Research in Marketing, 25(2): 104–108.
- Dolnicar, S. & Leisch, F. (2010) Evaluation of Structure and Reproducibility of Cluster Solutions Using the Bootstrap. Marketing Letters, 21(1): 83–101.
- Dolnicar, S. & Grün, B. (2008) Challenging "Factor Cluster Segmentation". Journal of Travel Research, 47(1): 63–71.
- Dimitriadou, E., Dolnicar, S. & Weingessel, A. (2002) An Examination of Indexes for Determining the Number of Clusters in Binary Data Sets. Psychometrika, 67(1): 137–160.

== Personal life ==
Dolničar was born in Ljubljana, Slovenia, grew up in Vienna, Austria, and moved to Australia in 2002.
