= Nelson H. H. Graburn =

Anthropologist (1936–2025)

- Born: November 25, 1936; London, United Kingdom
- Died: February 27, 2025 (aged 89)
- Occupation: Professor
- Years active: 1950s–2025
- Known for: Canadian Inuit social and cultural anthropology, kinship, art, tourism, Japan

Academic background
- Education: B.A. Natural Sciences and Social Anthropology, Clare College (1958); M.A. Anthropology, McGill University (1960); Ph.D. Anthropology University of Chicago(1963)
- Alma mater: University of Chicago
- Thesis: Taqagmiut Eskimo Kinship Terminology (1963)
- Doctoral advisor: David M. Schneider
- Influences: William E. Willmott

Academic work
- Discipline: Sociocultural Anthropology
- Institutions: Canadian Arctic, Japan
- Notable works: Ethnic Tourist Arts: Cultural Expressions from the Fourth World (1987)
- Influenced: Mari Lyn Salvador

Nelson H. H. Graburn (November 25, 1936 – February 27, 2025) was a professor emeritus in Sociocultural Anthropology at University of California, Berkeley.

== Education ==
Graburn studied as King's School, Canterbury from 1950 to 1955. He earned his B.A. in Natural Sciences and Social Anthropology at Clare College in 1958 and his M.A. Anthropology at McGill University, Montreal in 1960. He completed his Ph.D. in anthropology at the University of Chicago in 1963. His PhD research was partially based on research by the Northern Co-ordination and Research Centre.

== Career ==
Graburn began teaching at Berkeley in 1964. He had visiting appointments at a number of national museums globally including the National Museum of Civilization in Ottawa, Canada Le Centre des Hautes Etudes Touristiques, Aix-en-Provence, the National Museum of Ethnology (Minpaku) in Osaka, the Research Center for Korean Studies, Kyushu National University, Fukuoka, the International Institute for Culture, Tourism and Development, London Metropolitan University, the Federal University of Rio Grande do Sul, Porto Alegre, Brazil and he lectured at twenty-four Chinese universities. He is currently a professor emeritus in Sociocultural Anthropology at University of California, Berkeley.

His areas of research included "social and cultural anthropology, kinship, art, tourism, Japan, circumpolar, China, Heritage, and Inuit."

=== Inuit ===
Graburn's Ph.D. was based on materials gathered in 1959 in the Inuit hamlet of Salluit, then known as, Sugluk, in Quebec, Canada, on Sugluk Inlet near Hudson Strait. He had fellowships from McGill-Carnegie Arctic Institute and Canada Council. The next year he spent three months in Kimmirut, then known as Lake Harbour, Baffin Island continuing his research with the Inuit. The data from the Sugluk fieldwork was the basis for his MA. The data from both field trips was also submitted as reports in 1960 and 1963 to the Canadian Government as part of the newly formed Northern Coordination and Research Centre. His dissertation, "Taqagmiut Eskimo Kinship Terminology" (1963) was reproduced as a contribution to the knowledge of the North and republished by the Department of Indian and Northern Affairs, Canada (INAC) in Ottawa, Canada in 1964. These reports were cited in the "Qikiqtani Truth Commission Community Histories 1950–1975".

In the 1960s he had a visiting appointment with the National Museum of Civilization in Ottawa, Canada. One of his first books was Eskimos without Igloos which was published in 1969.

By the early 2000s, he focused his research on contemporary Inuit arts which included "urban Inuit" artists. Graburn collaborated with Avataq, in Nunavik, an Inuit cultural organization. He also worked with Inuit institutions in Iqaluit, Nunavut "on aspects of cultural preservation and autonomy".

== Japan ==
In 1974, Graburn began his ethnographic research in Japan. He had a visiting appointment with the National Museum of Ethnology (Minpaku) in Osaka. He co-edited the 2007 publication entitled Multiculturalism in the New Japan: Crossing the Boundaries Within. Japan Studies called it a "valuable addition to the increasing literature on Japanese multiculturalism which has challenged the long-held homogeneous Japan thesis."

== Selected publications ==
Graburn's most highly cited works include his 1977 publication, Tourism: the Sacred Journey and his 1976 book entitled Ethnic Tourist Arts: Cultural Expressions from the Fourth World. His concept of "tourism as a "sacred journey"—a "structurally-necessary, ritualized" break from routines during which it is taboo for the tourist to work"—contributed to the new area of anthropology of tourism that was emerging in the 1970s.

In Ethnic Tourist Arts, Graburn... sought to provide a "more coherent framework for evaluating not only the art and artisans but, perhaps more importantly, the peculiar ethnoaesthetic context in which both creator and consumer come to evaluate each other."

== Death ==
Graburn died on February 27, 2025, at the age of 88.

== See also ==
- Valene L. Smith (1926–2024), contemporary tourism studies scholar
