= Anadolu =

Anadolu (from Ancient Greek ἀνατολή anatolḗ, 'east') is the Turkish form of Anatolia, which refers to a region of the world that is now part of the nation of Turkey, also known as Asia Minor (Medieval and Modern Greek).

Anadolu may also refer to:

== Education ==
- Anadolu University, Turkish university
- Bursa Anadolu Lisesi, Bursa Anatolian High School

== Sports ==
- Anadolu Efes S.K., Turkish basketball club
- Anadolu Üsküdar 1908, Turkish football club

== Transportation ==
- Anadolu Airport, Turkish airport
- AnadoluJet, Turkish airline
- Isuzu (Anadolu), a coach-manufacturing company

== Other uses ==
- Proper name of the star WASP-52
- Anadolu Efes Biracılık ve Malt Sanayii A.Ş., Turkish brewing company
- Anadolu Mecmuası, a periodical published by Hilmi Ziya Ülken and Reşat Kayı
- Anadolu Agency, Turkish news agency
- Anadolu Medical Center, hospital in Turkey
- Anadolu pony, a breed of horse native to the region
- Anadolu Shipyard, a Turkish shipbuilding company in the defense industry
- Anadoluhisarı, a castle in Istanbul
- TCG Anadolu, a drone-carrying amphibious assault ship of the Turkish navy

== See also ==
- Anatolia (disambiguation)
- Anadol
