= Hirini Matunga =

New Zealand planning academic

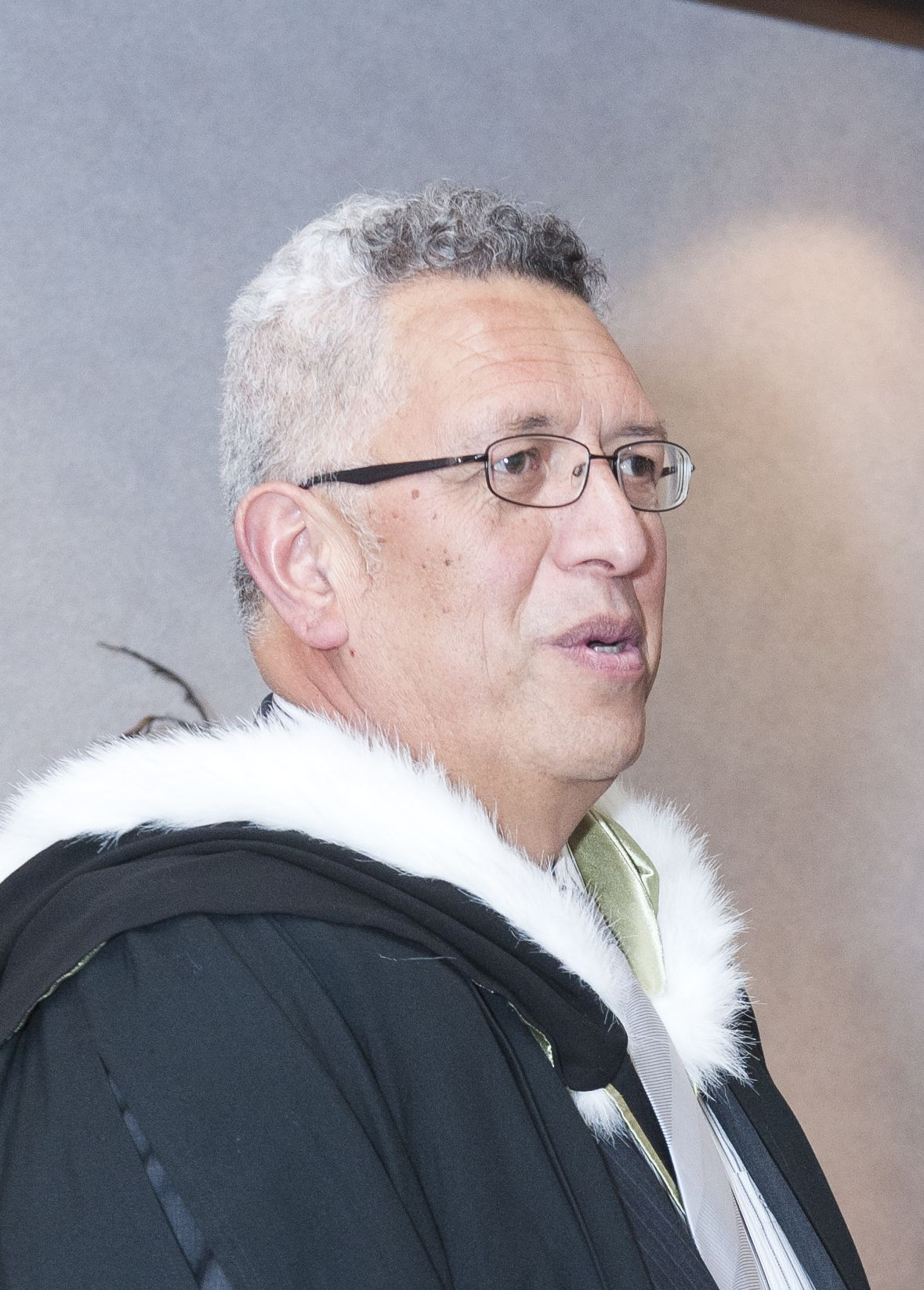
- Matunga in 2013
- Education: University of Auckland
- Scientific career
- Fields: Town planning
- Workplaces: Lincoln University

Hirini Matunga is a New Zealand town planning academic and as of 2019 is a full professor at the Lincoln University. He has written on Māori tourism as well as indigenous thinking within the field of urban planning.

== Academic career ==
With a degree in town planning from the University of Auckland Matunga had 25 years experience as a town planner before joining Lincoln University as Director of the Centre for Maori and Indigenous Planning and Development.

== Selected works ==
- Matunga, Hirini. "Theorizing indigenous planning." Reclaiming indigenous planning (2013): 3–32.
- McIntosh*, Alison J., Frania Kanara Zygadlo, and Hirini Matunga. "Rethinking Maori tourism." Asia Pacific Journal of Tourism Research 9, no. 4 (2004): 331–352.
- Matunga, Hirini. "Decolonising planning: The Treaty of Waitangi, the environment and a dual planning tradition." Environmental planning and management in New Zealand (2000): 36–47.
- Dalziel, Paul, Hirini Matunga, and Caroline Saunders. "Cultural well-being and local government: Lessons from New Zealand." Australasian Journal of Regional Studies, The 12, no. 3 (2006): 267.
- Matunga, Hirini. "17 Waahi tapu: Maori sacred sites." Sacred sites, sacred places 23 (1994): 217.
- Zygadlo, F., Alison J. McIntosh, Hirini P. Matunga, John R. Fairweather, and David G. Simmons. "Maori tourism: concepts, characteristics and definition." (2003).

== Personal life ==
Matunga is Māori, of Kāti Māmoe, Ngāti Kahungunu, Ngāi Tahu, and Rongowhakaata descent.
