= Maree Thyne =

New Zealand marketing professor

Academic background
- Thesis: Social distance and resident support for tourism (2001)

Academic work
- Institutions: University of Otago

Maree Thyne is a New Zealand academic, and is a full professor of marketing at the University of Otago, specialising in consumer behaviour, particularly cruise tourism.

== Academic career ==
Thyne holds a Bachelor of Arts, a Bachelor of Tourism, and a graduate diploma. She completed a PhD titled Social distance and resident support for tourism at the University of Otago in 2001. Thyne then joined the faculty of the University of Otago, rising to full professor in 2021. She has been a member of the university senate and as of 2024 she is the Pro Vice Chancellor of Commerce and the Dean of the Business School. Thyne has previously served as Head of the Department of Marketing at the University of Otago.

During her tenure in senior leadership, the university’s marketing department was the subject of media reports describing low morale and concerns including bullying and racism, based on internal documents reported by the Otago Daily Times in April 2025. Subsequent reporting described an external facilitation process and concerns about workplace culture. In October 2025, Thyne wrote to the Otago Daily Times defending university management in response to coverage of the department.

Thyne's research focuses on consumer behaviour in tourism, including the interactions between tourists, cultural tourism and the motivations of cruise ship passengers. Thyne works with stakeholders such as Cruise New Zealand Association, National Port Authorities, regional tourism organisations and individual tourism operators to understand tourism behaviour. As part of Otago's research theme on Food Waste Innovation, she is also involved in research on consumer and producer behaviour around food waste and waste reduction strategies. Thyne is also part of the Research Network for Sustainable Business at Otago.

In 2004 Thyne co-edited the book Hospitality, tourism, and lifestyle concepts: Implications for quality management and customer satisfaction (published by Haworth Hospitality Press) with Eric Laws.

Thyne is or has been on the editorial board of a number of international journals, including the Journal of Travel Research, and Tourism Management Perspectives.

== Selected works ==
- Adriana Campelo; Robert Aitken; Maree Thyne; Juergen Gnoth (2013). "Sense of Place: The Importance for Destination Branding". Journal of Travel Research. 53 (2): 154–166. doi:10.1177/0047287513496474. Wikidata Q124178830.
- Maree Thyne (2001). "The importance of values research for nonprofit organisations: the motivation‐based values of museum visitors". International Journal of Nonprofit and Voluntary Sector Marketing. 6 (2): 116–130. doi:10.1002/nvsm.140. Wikidata Q124178832.
- Maree Thyne (2001). "The importance of values research for nonprofit organisations: the motivation‐based values of museum visitors". International Journal of Nonprofit and Voluntary Sector Marketing. 6 (2): 116–130. doi:10.1002/nvsm.140. Wikidata Q124178832.
- Robert Nash; Maree Thyne; Sylvie Davies (2006). "An investigation into customer satisfaction levels in the budget accommodation sector in Scotland: a case study of backpacker tourists and the Scottish Youth Hostels Association". Tourism Management. 27 (3): 525–532. doi:10.1016/j.tourman.2005.01.001. Wikidata Q124178947.
- Seonaidh McDonald; Caroline Oates; Maree Thyne; Panayiota Alevizou; Leigh‐Ann McMorland (2009). "Comparing sustainable consumption patterns across product sectors". International Journal of Consumer Studies. 33 (2): 137–145. doi:10.1111/j.1470-6431.2009.00755.x. Wikidata Q124178948.
