= Anatolian =

Anatolian or anatolica may refer to:

- Anything of, from, or related to the region Anatolia
- Anatolians, ancient Indo-European peoples who spoke the Anatolian languages
- Anatolian High School, a type of Turkish educational institution
- Anatolian Plate, the tectonic plate on which Turkey sits
- Anatolian hieroglyphs, a script of central Anatolia
- Anatolian languages, a group of extinct Indo-European languages
- Anatolian rock, a genre of rock music from Turkey
- Anatolian Shepherd, a breed of dog
- Anatolica, scientific journal published by The Netherlands Institute for the Near East

== See also ==
- Anadolu (disambiguation)
- Anatolia (disambiguation)
