= Sidney Smith (Canada West politician) =

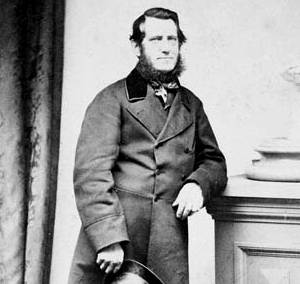
Smith

Sidney Smith QC (October 16, 1823 – September 27, 1889) was a lawyer and political figure in Canada West.

He was born in Port Hope, Upper Canada in 1823, the son of John David Smith. He studied law with his brother, John Shuter, was admitted to the bar in 1844 and set up practice in Cobourg. He served on the municipal council for Cobourg and Hamilton Township and served as warden for Northumberland and Durham counties. In 1854, Smith was elected to the Legislative Assembly for the West riding of Northumberland; he was re-elected in 1857 but defeated in 1861.

He served as Postmaster General and on the Board of Railway Commissioners from 1858 to 1862. In 1858, he negotiated arrangements with the United States, Britain, France, Belgium, and Prussia for mail service to Canada. In 1861, he was elected to the Legislative Council for Trent division. Smith was named Queen's Counsel in 1862.

He was unsuccessful in an attempt to gain election to the Legislative Assembly in 1863 and he returned to the practice of law in Peterborough. Smith also served as captain in the local militia. In 1866, he was appointed inspector general for registry offices in Canada West and he served the same function for Ontario after Confederation. He died in Cobourg in 1889.
