= Sidney Dawson =

English footballer

Personal information
- Full name: Sidney Dawson
- Date of birth: 1893
- Place of birth: Mexborough, England
- Position: Full-back

Senior career*
Years	Team	Apps	(Gls)
1911–1912	Denaby United		
1912–1913	The Wednesday	0	(0)
1913–1914	Kilnhurst Town		
1914–1919	Northampton Town		
1919–1921	Grimsby Town	48	(0)
1921–192?	Denaby United		
- * Club domestic league appearances and goals

Sidney Dawson (born 1893) was an English professional footballer who played as a full-back.
