= Sydney (name) =

Notable people and characters named Sydney include:

== Given name ==
=== Men ===
- Sydney Allard (1910–1966), British car company founder
- Sydney Ancher (1904–1978), Australian architect
- Sydney Arnold, 1st Baron Arnold (1878–1945), radical British Liberal Party politician
- Sydney Atkinson (1901–1977), South African athlete
- Sydney D. Bailey (1916–1995), English author and pacifist
- Sydney Barnes (1873–1967), English cricketer
- Sydney Beaumont (1884–1939), English professional footballer and football manager, runner and cricketer
- Sydney Brenner (1927–2019), South African biologist
- Sydney Brown (American football) (born 2000), Canadian American football player
- Sydney Savory Buckman (1860–1929), British paleontologist
- Sydney Burdekin (1839–1899), Australian politician
- Sydney Bush (1929–2018), British optometrist
- Sydney Butchkes (1922–2015), American visual artist and designer
- Sydney Buxton, 1st Earl Buxton (1853–1934), radical British Liberal politician
- Sydney Caine (1902–1991), English educator and economist
- Sydney Camm (1893–1966), English aeronautical engineer
- Sydney Carline (1888–1929), British artist and teacher
- Sydney Chaplin (1885–1965), English actor
- Sydney Earle Chaplin (1926–2009), American actor
- Sydney Chapman, multiple people
- Syd Cohen (1906–1988), American baseball pitcher
- Sydney Dacres (1805–1884), English admiral
- Sydney de Zoysa (1909–1994), Sri Lankan Sinhala police officer
- Sydney Dickens (1847–1872) son of English novelist Charles Dickens
- Sydney Dobell (1824–1874), English poet and critic
- Sydney Dodd (c. 1874–1926), British veterinary surgeon and scientist
- Sydney Donkin (1871–1952), British civil engineer
- Sydney Dowse (1918–2008), Royal Air Force pilot
- Sydney "Syd" Einfeld (1909–1995), Australian politician and Jewish community leader
- Sydney F. Foster (1893–1973), Chief Judge of the New York Court of Appeals
- Sydney Fremantle (1867–1958), English admiral
- Sydney Gardner (1884–1965), Australian politician
- Sydney Gedge (1829–1923), British Conservative politician
- Sydney Greenstreet (1879–1954), English actor
- Sydney Greve (1925–2015) Two-time Anglo-Indian Olympic boxer.
- Sydney Grundy (1848–1914), English dramatist
- Sydney Gun-Munro (1916–2007), Saint Vincent and the Grenadines politician
- Sydney J. Harris (1917–1986), American journalist
- Sydney Herring (1881–1951), Australian Army colonel and temporary brigadier general in the First World War
- Sydney Hinam (1898–1982), Welsh rugby union and professional rugby league footballer
- Sydney Holland, 2nd Viscount Knutsford (1855–1931), British barrister and peer
- Sydney Horler (1888–1954), British novelist
- Sydney Jacobson, Baron Jacobson (1908–1988), British journalist
- Sydney Jary (1924–2019), British Army officer
- Sydney Josland (1904–1991), New Zealand bacteriologist
- Sydney Kentridge (born 1922), South African lawyer and judge
- Sydney Kyte (1896–1981), British bandleader
- Sydney Lamb (born 1929), American linguist
- Sydney Laurence (1865–1940), American painter
- Sydney Lipton (1905–1995), British dance band leader
- Sydney McMeekan (1925–1991), British basketball player
- Sydney Mufamadi (born 1959), South African politician
- Sydney Newman (1917–1997), Canadian film and television producer
- Sydney A. Oades (1890–1961), British World War I flying ace
- Sydney Olivier, 1st Baron Olivier (1859–1943), British civil servant
- Sydney Omarr (1926–2003), American astrologist
- Sydney Paget (1857–1916), English aristocrat
- Sydney Parkinson (1745–1771), Scottish illustrator
- Sydney Pierre, Mauritian politician
- Sydney Pollack (1934–2008), American film actor
- Sydney Possuelo (born 1940), Brazilian explorer and ethnographer
- Sydney Ringer (1836–1910), British pharmacologist
- Sydney Rowell (1894–1975), Australian soldier, Chief of the General Staff from 1950 to 1954
- Sydney Domville Rowland (1872–1917), English physician
- Sydney Sanner (1872–1961), justice of the Montana Supreme Court
- Sydney Schanberg (1934–2016), American journalist
- Sydney Segal (1920–1997), Canadian pediatrician and neonatologist
- Sydney Sekeramayi (born 1944), Zimbabwean politician
- Sydney Selwyn (1934–1996), British physician, medical scientist, and professor
- Sydney Shearer (1890–1973), New Zealand rugby union player
- Sydney Shoemaker (1931–2022), American philosopher
- Sydney Silverman (1895–1968), British politician
- Sydney Simmons (1840–1924), British entrepreneur and philanthropist
- Sydney Vincent Sippe (1889–1968), British pioneer aviator
- Sydney Skaife (1889–1976), South African entomologist
- Sydney Smirke (1798–1877), English architect
- Sydney Smith (1771–1845), English writer
- Sydney Tafler (1916–1979), English actor
- Sydney Taylor (1904–1978), American author
- Sydney Templeman, Baron Templeman (1920–2014), British judge
- Sydney James Van Pelt (1908–1976), Australian medical practitioner
- Sydney J. Van Scyoc (1939–2023), American science fiction writer
- Sydney Curnow Vosper (1866–1942), English painter
- Sydney Rigby Wason (1887–1969), senior British Army officer in the Second World War
- Sydney Wignall (1922–2012), British marine archaeologist, climber, explorer and spy
- Sydney Wilson (born 1990), English former professional snooker player
- Sydney Wooderson (1914–2006), English athlete
- Sydney Youngblood (born 1960), American-German singer, actor and composer

=== Women ===
- Sydney Affolter (born c. 2003), American basketball player
- Sydney Agudong (born 2000), American actress and singer
- Sydney Baldwin (born 1996), American ice hockey defender
- Sydney Bard (born 2001), American ice hockey player
- Sydney Barros (born 2005), American artistic gymnast
- Sydney Blomquist (born 1993), American professional soccer player
- Sydney Craven (born 1994), English actress
- Sydney Cummings (born 1999), American-born Guyanese professional footballer
- Sydney Fairbrother (1872–1941), British actress
- Sydney Hopper (born 2007), American footballer
- Sydney Kamlager (born 1972), American politician
- Sydney Land (1995–2016), American victim of unsolved shooting
- Sydney Leroux Dwyer (born 1990), Canada-born American soccer player
- Sydney Magruder Washington, American ballet dancer and blogger
- Sydney Mancasola, American opera soprano
- Sydney Mikayla (born 2003), American actress
- Sydney Morrow (born 2004), American ice hockey player
- Sydney Morgan (1781?–1859) Irish novelist
- Sydney Morton (born 1985), American stage and television actress, singer and dancer
- Sydney Park (actress) (born 1997), American actress and comedian
- Sydney Parr, American softball player
- Sydney Parrish (born 2001), American former basketball player
- Sydney Penny (born 1971), American actress
- Sydney Tamiia Poitier (born 1973), Bahamanian-American actress, daughter of Sidney Poitier
- Sydney Pokorny (1965–2008), American lesbian writer, editor, columnist and activist
- Sydney Rossman (born 1995), American ice hockey player
- Sydney Sadick (born 1994), American on-air fashion and entertainment commentator
- Sydney Satchell (born 1992), American sitting volleyball player
- Sydney Sierota (born 1997), lead singer of Echosmith
- Sydney Sullenberger (born 2004), American archer
- Sydney Sweeney (born 1997), American actress
- Sydney Towle (1999-2026), American internet personality
- Sydney Walsh (born 1961), American actress
- Sydney Rae White (born 1991), English actress and singer

== Surname ==
- Algernon Sydney (1623–1683), English politician
- Berenice Sydney (1944–1983), English artist
- Grahame Sydney (born 1948), New Zealand artist
- Harry Sydney (born 1959), American football player
- Joan Sydney (1936–2022), English actress
- Robin Sydney (born 1984), American actress

== Fictional characters ==
- Sydney Adamu, character in the television show The Bear
- Sydney Andrews, character in the television series Melrose Place
- Sydney Bristow, character in the television series Alias
- Sydney Carton, character in the novel A Tale of Two Cities
- Sydney Drew, character in the television series Power Rangers: S.P.D.
- Sydney Fox, character in the television series Relic Hunter
- Sydney Reynolds, one of the main characters in the Disney Channel series Sydney to the Max
- Sydney, character in the television series The Pretender
- Kevin Sidney, fictional character in the X-Men comic series

== See also ==
- Sidney (surname)
- Sidney (given name)
