= Sydney Chapman =

Sydney Chapman may refer to:

- Sir Sydney Chapman (economist) (1871–1951), British economist and civil servant
- Sydney Chapman (mathematician) (1888–1970), FRS, British mathematician
- Sir Sydney Chapman (politician) (1935–2014), British Conservative MP
