= Bursa Anatolian High School =

Coordinates: 40.2104°N 29.0184°E

- Bursa; Turkey

Information
- Type: Public
- Established: 1970
- Principal: Fatih Odabaş
- Asst. Principal: Serkan Dericioğlu
- Colors: Blue and White
- Website: http://bursaanadolulisesi.meb.k12.tr

Bursa Anatolian High School (Turkish: Bursa Anadolu Lisesi; BAL), is a public boarding secondary school in Bursa, Turkey. BAL is one of the most prominent high schools in the West Anatolian area. It was established in 1970 as Education College (Maarif Koleji) and later was renamed as Bursa Anatolian High School becoming the first Anatolian High School in Bursa Province. The education of BAL is in English. German and French are taught as foreign languages, as well. Moreover, in 2008, BAL has been selected and awarded by Turkish Ministry of National Education as the best secondary school in Turkey.

== Education ==
Admission to the school is through a special entrance exam. Until 1974 this exam was performed by the exam commissions set up in the school under the supervision of Provincial National Education Admission. Since 1974 a single exam for all Anadolu High Schools is performed centrally by Ministry of National Education.

Until 2000-2001 educational year, the school's education period was seven years (which were completely in English): a year of English preparation class, three years of intermediate school, and three years of high school. Since then, the education period is four years which includes a year of preparation class and three years of high school including grades 9–11. The school has an enrollment of 900-950 students.

Also the New Year Kareoke Competition has been coordinating annually since 2007. This activity can be coordinated by students' contributions mostly. After 2017, this competition also evolved in another category called as Show Presentations. This includes mostly dancing and humorous events. In 2019 Ballas's Show was selected as the best superior one across the years and Hall of Fame Reward has given them.
