= Sidney (surname) =

Sidney or Sydney is an English surname. It is probably derived from an Anglo-Saxon locational name, [æt þǣre] sīdan īege, "[at the] gorgeous island/watermeadow" (in the dative case). There is also a folk etymological derivation from the French place name Saint Denis.

The name has also been used as a given name since the 19th century.

== British peerage ==
The Sidney family rose to prominence in the Tudor period with the courtier Sir William Sidney (d. 1554). His son Henry Sidney (1529–1586) became a prominent politician and courtier. By Mary Dudley, Lady Sidney (d. 1586) he was the father of Philip Sidney (1554–1586), poet and courtier under Elizabeth I, Mary Sidney (1561–1621), married Mary Herbert, Countess of Pembroke and Robert Sidney, 1st Earl of Leicester (d. 1626).

The latter was created Baron Sydney of Penhurst in 1603. Following Robert, the Earls of Leicester bore the surname Sidney:

- Robert Sidney, 2nd Earl of Leicester (1595–1677)
  - The republican Algernon Sidney (1623–1683) was a son of Robert Sidney, 2nd Earl of Leicester.
  - Henry Sidney (1641–1704), a son of Robert Sidney, 2nd Earl of Leicester, was created Baron Milton and Viscount Sidney in 1689 and Earl of Romney in 1694.
- Philip Sidney, 3rd Earl of Leicester (1619–1698)
- Robert Sidney, 4th Earl of Leicester (1649–1702)
- Philip Sidney, 5th Earl of Leicester (1676–1705)
- John Sidney, 6th Earl of Leicester (1680–1737)
- Jocelyn Sidney, 7th Earl of Leicester (1682–1743)

The first creation of the title Baron Sydney was extinct with the death of the 7th Earl of Leicester in 1743.

In 1768, Dudley Cosby, Minister Plenipotentiary to Denmark between 1763 and 1765, was made Baron Sydney (second creation), of Stradbally in the Queen's County, in the Peerage of Ireland. This creation became extinct on Lord Sydney's death in 1774.

Thomas Townshend was created Baron Sydney (third creation) of Chiselhurst in 1783. He was later created Viscount Sydney. Sydney Cove and by extension Sydney, Australia are named for him.

- John Thomas Townshend, 2nd Viscount Sydney (1764–1831)
- John Robert Townshend, 3rd Viscount Sydney (1805–1890), created Earl Sydney in 1874)

Elizabeth, daughter and heiress of Thomas Sidney, fourth son of Robert Sidney, 4th Earl of Leicester, was the grandmother of John Shelley-Sidney, whose son Philip Sidney (1800–1851) was raised to the Peerage of the United Kingdom as Baron De L'Isle and Dudley. His successors also carried the surname Sidney:

- Philip Sidney, 2nd Baron De L'Isle and Dudley (1828–1898)
- Philip Sidney, 3rd Baron De L'Isle and Dudley (1853–1922)
- Algernon Sidney, 4th Baron De L'Isle and Dudley (1854–1945)
- William Sidney, 5th Baron De L'Isle and Dudley (1859–1945)
- William Philip Sidney, 6th Baron De L'Isle and Dudley (1909–1991)
- Philip John Algernon Sidney, 2nd Viscount De L'Isle (b. 1945)

== Other people ==
Other people with the surname include:

- Angela Sidney (1902–1991), Tagish storyteller
- George Sidney (1916–2002), American film director
- Saniyya Sidney (b. 2006), American actress
- Sylvia Sidney (1910–1999), American actress
- Donald Sidney-Fryer (b. 1934), American poet

== See also ==
- Sidney (given name)
- Sydney (name)
