= Sidney C. Smith Jr. =

American cardiologist and Professor of Medicine

Sidney C. Smith Jr. is an American cardiologist and Professor of Medicine in the Division of Cardiology at the University of North Carolina at Chapel Hill. He served as president of the American Heart Association (1994–1995) and the World Heart Federation (2011–2013).

== Early life and education ==
Smith graduated from Virginia Tech before attending Yale School of Medicine, where he received his medical degree in 1967. He completed his medical internship and residency in internal medicine at Peter Bent Brigham Hospital (now Brigham and Women's Hospital) at Harvard Medical School from 1967 to 1969, followed by a cardiology fellowship from 1969 to 1971. During his fellowship, he worked under Richard Gorlin focusing on cardiac catheterization, coronary blood flow, and left ventricular mechanics.

== Career ==
In 1973, Smith was recruited to the University of Colorado as Director of Cardiac Catheterization, where he performed procedures on both children and adults. He later joined the University of North Carolina at Chapel Hill, where he has been a faculty member for over four decades. At UNC, Smith serves as Professor of Medicine in the Division of Cardiology and Director of the Center for Cardiovascular Science and Medicine. He has maintained an active clinical practice performing invasive cardiology procedures for more than 50 years, including 27 years in the catheterization lab at UNC Hospitals. From 1998 to the present, he has been selected annually for Best Doctors in America.

== Leadership positions ==
Smith served as president of the American Heart Association from 1994 to 1995. During his tenure, he met with President Bill Clinton in the Oval Office to discuss tobacco policies and later with President George W. Bush regarding exercise programs. He also served as Chief Science Officer for the AHA.

From 2011 to 2013, Smith served as president of the World Heart Federation. Prior to his presidency, he chaired the WHF Scientific Advisory Board from 2003 to 2011. In 2011, he spoke at the United Nations' first meeting on non-communicable diseases about the global burden of cardiovascular disease. He co-chaired four World Congress of Cardiology meetings in Barcelona, Buenos Aires, Beijing, and Dubai.

Smith chaired the ACC/AHA Task Force on Practice Guidelines and led development of multiple clinical guidelines, including those for percutaneous coronary intervention, secondary prevention for patients with atherosclerotic vascular disease, and management of acute myocardial infarction (STEMI). He served on ACC/AHA guideline committees for blood cholesterol, risk prediction, lifestyle, and hypertension, and co-chaired the ACC/AHA Bethesda Conference on Professionalism and Ethics.

He chaired the Executive Committee for the National Heart, Lung, and Blood Institute (NHLBI) of the National Institutes of Health for Integrated Guidelines for the prevention of cardiovascular disease, where he also served as a Senior Advisor.

== International work ==
Smith has led quality improvement programs and guideline development in multiple countries. He worked with the American Heart Association and the Chinese Society of Cardiology in 150 hospitals in China to improve cardiac care, and participated in three Person-to-Person meetings with China led by Vice President Joe Biden and Secretary of State John Kerry. His international projects include evidence-based guideline development for myocardial infarction, heart failure, and atrial fibrillation in China, Brazil, and Dubai.

== Publications and research ==
Smith has authored or co-authored nearly 500 publications. He has served on the editorial boards of the Journal of the American College of Cardiology, Circulation, JAMA Cardiology, the Journal of Cardiovascular Medicine, and the Journal of Clinical and Experimental Cardiology. His research focus includes coronary heart disease, preventive cardiology, valvular heart disease, and cardiac rehabilitation.

== Awards and honors ==
Smith received the World Heart Federation Lifetime Achievement Award in 2019 at the World Congress of Cardiology in Paris.

His awards from the American Heart Association include the Physician of the Year Award, Distinguished National Leadership Award, Gold Heart Award, Eugene Drake Award (2003), Joseph Stokes Award in Preventive Cardiology (2013), Council of Clinical Cardiology Distinguished Achievement Award (2013), Chairman's Award, James Herrick Distinguished Clinician Award (2018), and Ron Haddock International Impact Award (2015). He received the Brazilian Cardiology Society International Teaching Award and the NHLBI/NIH Award of Special Recognition (2003).

== Professional memberships ==
Smith is a Fellow of the American Heart Association, American College of Physicians, European Society of Cardiology, and Royal Society of Medicine. He holds Master Fellow status in the American College of Cardiology and is an Honorary International Fellow of the Japanese Circulation Society and the Chilean Society of Cardiology and Cardiovascular Surgery.
