= Santa Anatolia =

Santa Anatolia may refer to:

- Sant'Anatolia di Narco, municipality in the Province of Perugia in the Italian region Umbria
- Victoria, Anatolia, and Audax, martyrs and saints venerated by the Catholic Church
