= Mari Lyn Salvador =

American anthropologist (1943–2017)

Mari Lyn Salvador (16 June 1943 – 23 October 2017) was an American anthropologist, known for her work on Panamanian molas, worn by Kuna women. She became the director of the San Diego Museum of Man and the Hearst Museum of Anthropology. Salvador's career focused on analysis of ethnoaesthetics, or the appreciation of art in its own cultural context, from a variety of peoples.

== Biography ==
Salvador started college as an art student focusing on weaving and pottery at San Francisco State University. After graduating, she joined the Peace Corps in 1966, and was sent to Panama to help build chicken coops. She started an artist's cooperative with the Guna during the course of the project and began her study of molas.

As a graduate student, Salvador collected molas during her graduate studies and based her book, The Art of Being Kuna: Layers of Meaning Among the Kuna of Panama, on that compilation. Her collection later formed a significant part of UCLA Fowler Museum of Cultural History's initial exhibits.

After returning from Panama, she pursued a PhD in cultural anthropology at University of California at Berkeley, and focused on art culture in Kuna people. She followed the work of Lila O'Neale and Nelson H. H. Graburn, using analysis of ethnoaesthetics to understand the art of Kuna women from the perspective of the individual artists within the framework of their own culture. For instance, among the Kuna, only women create visual art, as opposed to verbal arts or oratory, and its creation is a communal experience. Women and girls of all ages work together, share designs and learn from each other. The social element bonds these women together, and it reinforces other elements in society, as Kuna art is intertextual, referring to and borrowing from other arts and media. Artistic form is important in Kuna life, beyond the aesthetics of a piece: it informs notions of performance and ritual in addition to reflecting social values upheld in those performances. Visual art allows the Kuna to identify themselves as a separate and isolated group, but also crosses social boundaries as the Kuna have sought controlled contact; this last is demonstrated in the molas themselves, which have incorporated non-Kuna elements since the 1920s.

== Post-graduate work ==
Following completion of her PhD in 1976, Salvador taught at University of the Azores in Portugal, while on a Fulbright scholarship to study native religious celebrations called festas. She continued this research more locally, in southern California, among Portuguese-American communities for several years, focusing on the aesthetics of ritual performance and the ways in which art is used in ritual. She also worked with contemporary Hispanic artists in New Mexico to study and exhibit religious imagery known as santos, attempting to understand the importance of the creative process among these artists in both aesthetic and devotional contexts.

== Museum career ==
Salvador served as chief curator at the Maxwell Museum of Anthropology at the University of New Mexico from 1978 until becoming director at the San Diego Museum of Man in 2005. In 2009, Salvador was appointed to the directorship of the Hearst Museum of Anthropology at the University of California, Berkeley, a post which she held until July 2015. Dr. Salvador advocated bringing community elders to museums as scholars and has worked with many such elders in doing research for the National Museum of the American Indian in Washington, D.C. Her focus on gender and indigenous peoples served as a widening of the San Diego Museum of Man's purpose beyond its literal name, indicative of the more general trend in museums today toward plurality. She also served as the president of the Council for Museum Anthropology (CMA), a section of the American Anthropological Association (AAA), from 2003 to 2005. Afterwards, she maintained a position on the board, reflecting her own and the council's mission to advance anthropology within the context of museums.

== Selected publications ==
- Salvador, Mari Lyn. Kuna Women’s Arts: Molas, Meanings and Markets. Crafting Gender: Women and Folk art in Latin America and the Caribbean. Eli Barta (ed). Durham, NC: Duke University Press. 2003.
- Salvador, Mari Lyn (ed.) The Art of Being Kuna: Layers of Meaning Among the Kuna of Panama. Berkeley: University of California. 1997.
- Salvador, Mari Lyn. Cuando Hablan Los Santos: Contemporary Santero Traditions from Northern New Mexico. Albuquerque: Maxwell Museum of Anthropology. 1995.
- Salvador, Mari Lyn. Festas Acoreanas: Portuguese Religious Celebrations in California and the Azores. Oakland: The Oakland Museum History Department. 1981.
