= Sidney H. Chang =

Chinese-born Taiwanese-American historian

- 張緖心
- Born: January 1, 1934; Wuchang, Hubei Province, China
- Died: October 3, 2016 (aged 82); Fresno, California, U.S.
- Occupations: Historian, journalist, academic, diplomat
- Spouse(s): Elaine Grace Pardue (m. 1962-2014; her death); Victoria A. Malko (m. 2015-2016; his death)
- Children: Gerald Walter Chi-chung Chang; Gregory Eugene Chi-tung Chang
- Awards: President's Medal of Merit (1984); Joseph Levenson Book Prize (nominated in 1992)

Academic background
- Education: National Taiwan University (BA); University of Missouri (MA); Florida State University (MS); University of Wisconsin Madison (PhD)

Academic work
- Discipline: History of Modern Far East
- Sub-discipline: Art History
- Institutions: California State University, Fresno; National Chengchi University

Sidney Hsu-Hsin Chang (simplified Chinese: 张绪心; traditional Chinese: 張緖心; pinyin: Zhāng Xùxīn; January 1, 1934 – October 3, 2016) was a Taiwanese-American historian, author, and academic specializing in the history of China, modern Far East, and East Asian civilizations. For nearly half a century he was a professor at California State University, Fresno. He was a visiting professor at National Chengchi University in Taipei, Taiwan. On behalf of the Republic of China on Taiwan, Chang served as an attaché at the Far East Trade Service Center in Frankfurt am Main, West Germany (1984–1985) and as a cultural attaché in Russia (1997–1999), while on sabbatical from teaching. He was a member of the Republican Presidential Task Force and the Republican National Committee.

== Early life and education ==
Born in Wuchang, Hubei Province, in southeast China, Chang spent much of his childhood in the adjacent Hunan Province. Wuchang is the place of China's first modern revolution, ignited by an accidental explosion that led to the rapid demise of the Manchu Qing dynasty and the development of the Republic of China. Sidney was the oldest of fourteen children, including five who did not survive infancy. His mother, Wen-jane Hwang, was a kindergarten teacher, and his father, Chung-ning Chang, was an official in the Chinese Nationalist government, a delegate to the National Assembly, and dean of students at the National Taiwan Normal University.

In 1945, he was attending Yali High School, also known as Yale-in-China, in Changsha, Hunan. The school was part of the Yale Mission College founded to bring "Western learning to the heart of China." When the Chinese Communist revolution began to gain momentum and the Nationalist government started to fail, he was separated from his family and fled alone to Hong Kong as a refugee in 1948. He was eventually reunited with his family in Macau and helped lead six of his younger siblings to Taiwan, where the family settled in 1950. Chang served in the Republic of China Armed Forces and graduated from National Taiwan University as a history major in 1955.

Next year he enrolled in a graduate program to study journalism at National Chengchi University, the only journalism school on Taiwan at the time, and worked as a news reporter for the Central Daily News. The school's dean, Milton J. T. Shieh, was also his major professor. Chang got his professor's recommendation to join a graduate program at the Missouri School of Journalism, where Shieh had graduated in 1945. Chang moved to America in August 1957 via a cargo ship that docked in Portland, Oregon. Two years later, he received a master's degree in journalism from the University of Missouri in Columbia in 1959. That year, the University of Missouri hosted the Press Congress of the World for three days, beginning on March 2, in honor of the 50th Anniversary of the School of Journalism. Among forty delegates from thirty-five countries was Milton J. T. Shieh. Chang wrote an article for the Columbia Missourian based on his interview with his mentor.

In 1961, he earned a master's degree in library science from Florida State University in Tallahassee, where he met his future wife of fifty-two years, Elaine Grace Pardue, whom he married on September 15, 1962. The couple raised their two sons on university campuses where they happened to live and work. Chang obtained a Doctor of Philosophy in East Asian History in January 1967, from University of Wisconsin at Madison. His minor fields included Indian Studies and Art History. He used rare documents from the Kuomintang Archives in Taipei, reports of witnesses and correspondents as well as U.S. State Department and the British Foreign Office documents to write his doctoral thesis on the Kuomintang's Foreign Policy, 1925–1928. The range of topics covered the Chinese war lords, Peking government, Nationalist government, Russian advisors, and British policies.

Chang conducted post-doctoral research at Harvard University East Asian Research Center and Charles Warren Center for Studies in American History in 1969 and 1970. Among his mentors at Harvard were prominent academicians John K. Fairbank and Henry Kissinger, who was then director of the Harvard International Seminar. At Harvard, Chang met two top Soviet Sinologists, Mikhail I. Sladkovsky, the director of the Institute of Oriental Studies and corresponding member of the Soviet Academy of Sciences, and Boris N. Zanegin, a Chinese-speaking senior research member of its Institute of the United States and Canada.

== Work ==
Chang co-wrote and co-edited five books. Together with Leonard H.D. Gordon of Purdue University he produced a comprehensive study of China's revolutionary, Sun Yat-sen, who helped lead the 1911 Revolution. The study, entitled All Under Heaven: Sun Yat-sen and His Revolutionary Thought, was published by the Stanford University's Hoover Institution Press in 1991. The title came from the Chinese Taoist teaching: "When the Great Way prevails, all under heaven will work for the people." The primary focus of the authors was on San Min Chu I, or Three People's Principles, the ideological doctrine that set force measures to bring about a new political and economic framework for China. The authors detailed the evolution of Sun's views and the intellectual challenges he faced in integrating such often conflicting strands as traditional Chinese thought, communist theory, and revolutionary strategy and objectives. By undertaking a fresh scrutiny of Sun's writings, ranging from books and formal speeches to telegrams and personal correspondence, the authors gave a compelling portrait of a man who as both a visionary and a pragmatist laid the foundation of modern Chinese state.

Chang and Gordon compiled a comprehensive bibliography of primary and secondary sources relevant to the revolutionary activities of Sun Yat-sen from the inception of his thought to the overthrow of the Qing dynasty and the establishment of a republic, from his eighteenth year in April 1885, until his death on March 12, 1925. The authors consulted over thirty library catalogs and visited research collections in major Asian libraries and archives in the United States, Europe, and East Asia. The first edition, which contains 2,216 entries in all bibliographical categories, was published in 1991. In addition to English, the original titles appeared in Chinese, Japanese, Korean, Russian, French, German, Spanish, Portuguese, Italian, Dutch, Swedish, Hebrew, Yiddish, Thai, and Hindi. The revised and enlarged second edition followed, adding major works published from 1989 to early 1997, for a total of 2,581 entries. Publications in Arabic, Tamil, and Hungarian were added. This bibliography lists writings by and about Sun Yat-sen as well as books, articles, translated works and document collections, doctoral dissertations, master's theses, and selected newspaper and magazine accounts, published during his lifetime and in subsequent years. The authors unearthed Sun Yat-sen's works published under sixty-nine names.

With Ramon H. Myers, a senior fellow and curator of the East Asian Collection at the Stanford University's Hoover Institution Library, Chang edited and compiled The Storm Clouds Clear over China: The Memoir of Ch'en Li-fu, 1900-1993, published by Hoover Institution Press in 1994. The editors condensed Timothy Tung's English translation of the original eleven-hundred-page handwritten Chinese manuscript to seven hundred pages, crosschecking the original Chinese writing of Ch'en against Tung's translation. They set with Chen Lifu for ten interviews, averaging two to three hours each. Answers related to various episodes added two hundred pages of transcriptions to the original. All the information from interviews plus follow-up correspondence with the author was integrated into the final product. The editors verified the facts and events recorded in the memoir through such sources as U.S. Military Reports: China 1911-1941, U.S. State Department Confidential Central Files: China Internal Affairs 1945-1949, and other publications of the State Department, notably U.S. Foreign Relations, 1927-1951. Ch'en Li-fu was of paramount importance in the Kuomintang throughout most of its existence. This was the first memoir in English about modern Chinese Nationalist politics. The information that it provided about a variety of questions, until the time of its publication quite concealed (Chiang Kai-shek's negotiations with the USSR, the organization of the Chinese secret services, the information about the Second United Front), was totally original.

To commemorate the 50th anniversary of Japan's surrender in the China theater on August 15, 1945, Chang organized a symposium at the Hong Kong University of Science and Technology on July 24–27, 1995. He published proceedings under the title China, 1925-1950: Symposium on the Memoir of Ch'en Li-fu.

Chang's last work, published in 2013, was based on ten seminars organized between 1974 and 1982 by the Central News Agency, Taipei, Taiwan, Republic of China, and its bureau in San Francisco, California. The annual seminars were held in the CNA office on Market Street. The theme of the seminars was U.S.-Taiwan policy. Participants in round table discussions included a dozen American and British educated Chinese scholars, journalists, as well as members of the Academia Sinica and visiting scholars. Topics ranged from politics to economics, law, and history.

== Criticism ==
Several scholars wrote critical reviews of All Under Heaven: Sun Yat-sen and His Revolutionary Thought. The book was recommended as "a supplementary text in upper division courses in revolutionary thought in the 20th century China, and to be used as a source of readings for any course in Modern China at the college and/or university level." The book was nominated for the 1992 Joseph Levenson Book Prize of the Association for Asian Studies. The book has three Chinese translations.

Marie-Claire Bergère, one of the leading experts on Sun Yat-sen, wrote her review of Bibliography of Sun Yat-sen in China's Republican Revolution, 1885-1925 (second edition) for The China Quarterly in 2000, praising it as a "very useful reading for specialists of early Republican China." The New York Public Library Oriental Division recommended the book as a tool for researchers in the area of modern Chinese history. The review section of Choice, a periodical published by the Association of college and Research Libraries, recommended the book to "undergraduate and graduate students, particularly students with Chinese-language capabilities majoring in Asian studies." American Reference Books Annual recommended the book, writing "the bibliography is drawn from commonly available publications and rare archival documents in all major libraries and archives, East and West, known to the compilers." The editors of Prescriptions for Saving China: Selected Writings of Sun Yat-sen, in the Bibliographic Note section, praised the work as "the definitive bibliography of works, in all languages, about Sun."

The Storm Clouds Clear Over China: The Memoir of Ch'en Li-fu, 1900-1993 received positive reviews. In 1994, Choice recommended the memoir as "a necessary book for college, university, and large public libraries. Upper division undergraduates and above." A year later, The China Quarterly reviewer wrote that "the footnotes and bibliography alone are very useful, and are well worth recommending to graduate students and scholars just beginning to move into the field. …It is important work that ought to be included in the libraries of specialists on Republican China." Lucien Bianco wrote a review of memoir for the French scholarly journal Revue Bibliographique de Sinologie in 1995. In 1996, The Journal of Asian Studies called it "an important book that will revive many discussions, confirm many opinions, and provide historical source material for research. It is also an important firsthand account for teachers' use."

== Teaching ==
For nearly half a century Sidney H. Chang was a professor at California State University, Fresno. Professor Chang taught a two-part lecture course on modern Far East pre- and post-1949, a critical turning point in world affairs. He also taught a graduate seminar on the Chinese Rebellions and Revolutions. He taught an undergraduate lecture course on East Asian civilizations, and later an introductory lecture course on American history from Reconstruction to the present.

== Diplomatic career ==
Professor Chang represented the Republic of China on Taiwan government as director of the Far East Trade Service Center in Frankfurt am Main, West Germany, from 1984 to 1985. His lecture, "The Sources of Chinese Tradition and the Thinking of Chinese Businessmen," presented at the Ruhr-Universität Bochum was published jointly by the Bundesstelle für Außenhandelsinformation, Köln, and Deutsches Wirtschaftsbüro Taipei, in 1984. On behalf of the Taiwan government, Chang negotiated trade deals with major German corporations, including Siemens AG. He visited the corporation's headquarters in Munich and toured its training facilities as well as research division.

Professor Chang worked as director of the Cultural Division at the Taipei-Moscow Economic and Cultural Coordination Commission in Moscow, Russian Federation, from 1997 to 1999, while on sabbatical from teaching. At the invitation of leading universities in Russia, Belarus, Azerbaijan, Armenia, Georgia, Kazakhstan, and Ukraine, he presented lectures on Confucianism and modern Chinese revolutions. He facilitated educational and cultural exchanges for students and scholars, athletes, as well as photo and fine art exhibitions, film festivals, and performances of dance and ballet companies from the Republic of China (Taiwan), Russia, and former Soviet republics. With assistance of his colleague, Victoria A. Malko, whom he married late in life, Chang compiled a guide to top one hundred higher educational institutions in Russia. It was published as an electronic resource by the International Research and Exchanges Board, Washington, D.C., on the organization's website in 2001. Prior to his last diplomatic appointment, he visited more than thirty countries for academic meetings and conferences, including seven trips to the Soviet Union in 1970, 1972, 1976, 1979, 1981, 1983, and 1991 at the invitation of the Soviet Academy of Sciences Institute of Far Eastern Studies and various universities and research institutions.

== Awards ==
Notable research grants included Wisconsin Ford Area Fellow (from 1963 to 1965) and American Philosophical Society Research Grant (summer of 1967 and 1969).

Chang received a Proclamation, certifying that his name had been entered in Ronald Wilson Reagan's official Presidential papers in recognition of outstanding support of the 1984 Republican Presidential Task Force. He was awarded President's Medal of Merit and Accompanying Lapel Pin. Chang was a member of the Republican National Committee.

== Death ==
On October 3, 2016, Sidney H. Chang died at his Fresno, California home after a brief hospital stay to treat gastrointestinal bleeding and other complications of the Parkinson's disease. He was 82 years of age. He was surrounded by family and friends. Over a hundred people, including relatives from Michigan, South Carolina, and Canada, as well as former students and colleagues attended the memorial and graveside services. His last wish for his five grandchildren was to urge them to continue family tradition.

== Selected works ==
- All Under Heaven: Sun Yat-sen and His Revolutionary Thought (Hoover Institution Press, 1991). Co-authored with Leonard H.D. Gordon. Nominated for the 1992 Joseph Levenson Book Prize of the Association for Asian Studies
- Bibliography of Sun Yat-sen in China's Republican Revolution, 1885-1925. First edition. (University Press of America, 1991). Co-authored with Leonard H.D. Gordon.
- The Storm Clouds Clear over China: The Memoir of Ch'en Li-fu, 1900-1993. (Hoover Institution Press, 1994). Co-edited and compiled with Ramon H. Myers.
- Chʻen Li-fu Hui I Lu Tʻao Lun Hui Lun Wen Chi: 1925 Nien Chih 1950 Nien Chih Chung-kuo. Hsin-tien shih: Kuo shih kuan. (China, 1925-1950: Symposium on the Memoir of Chʻen Li-fu. Commemorating the 50th Anniversary of Japan's Surrender in the China Theater, August 15, 1945. A Chinese Language Seminar at the Hong Kong University of Science and Technology, July 24–27, 1995). (Academia Historica, 1997). Co-edited with Yung-ching Chiang.
- Bibliography of Sun Yat-sen in China's Republican Revolution, 1885-1925. Revised and enlarged second edition. (University Press of America, 1998). Co-authored with Leonard H. D Gordon.
- China Seminar (1974-1982): Changing U.S.-Taiwan Policy. (Sino-American Cultural and Economic Association, 2013). In Chinese.
