= Sidney Lyon =

American lawyer and politician

Sidney Lyon (born 1884) was an American lawyer and state legislator in Illinois. He represented Chicago in the Illinois House of Representatives. He was a Republican. He graduated from the University of Michigan and University of Chicago. He lived in Chicago.
