= Sidney Robert Freshwater =

Australian cycling administrator (1919–2019)

Sidney Robert Freshwater, OAM, (1919 - April 2019) was a senior Australian cycling administrator who played a prominent role in the establishment of the professional cycling league in Australia. He was invited by the Union Cycliste Internationale to become a commissaire and was the first Australian to hold an A Grade UCI professional cycling licence.

Freshwater was awarded a Medal of the Order of Australia in 1982 for his services to the sport of cycling. Referees for his award included renowned Australian cyclist and politician Sir Hubert Opperman and VN (Norm) Gailey MBE, President of the Australian Amateur Cycling Federation.

At the age of 16, he won the St George (Sydney, Australia) Junior Championship and was the 100 miles record holder "around the block" for more than a decade. He was also a member of the winning team in 5 NSW Road Teams Premierships.

He held an extensive list of senior organising and control positions as a sports administrator, including:

- League of NSW Wheelmen: Councillor (1943-1987): NSW handicapper (1947-1953) Honorary Secretary (1950-1955) President (1955-1969) Patron Councillor (1970-1980) Awarded life membership
- Tour of the West: Organiser and director of first annual multiple stage cycling tour in Australia (1949-1955)
- Australian Cycling Council: NSW delegate (1952,1953) National Secretary (1953-1983)
- For Good of Cycling Committee: NSW Pedals Club organiser (1955,1956) NSW & Australian Schoolboy Cycling Championship originator and organiser (1957-1961)
- Commonwealth Jubilee Cycling Council (1951)
- Australian Cycling Federation: Secretary (1983-1985) with the AACA President Norm Gailey MBA organised and established the original Australian Cycling Federation as an umbrella body to oversee the national amateur and professional bodies
- Union Cycliste Internationale: first exam 1978 in New Zealand and acted as a reserve commissaire at the 1977 World Championships in Holland. Full commissaire World Championships Leicester, UK (1982) and Goodwood (1982); Commissaire Control Panel World Junior Road and Track Championships (1982)
- Chief Commissaire Australian Professional Road Championships: Launceston (1978) Newcastle (1979) Track Championships Brisbane (1983) Lavington Carnival (1983) and Commonwealth Games Brisbane: member of Commissaire Control Panel (1982)
