= Sidy =

Sidy is a male given name. Notable people with this name include:

- Cheikh Sidy Ba (born 1968), Senegalese football player
- Sidy Diagne (born 2002), football player
- Sidy Fassara Diabaté (born 1950), Malian film director
- Sidy Keita (born 1987), Senegalese football player
- Sidy Koné (born 1992), Malian football player
- Sidy Lamine Niasse (1950–2018), Senegalese lawyer, teacher, journalist, and religious guide
- Sidy Sagna (born 1990), Senegalese football player
- Sidy Sandy (born 1974), Guinean boxer
- Sidy Sanokho (born 1997), French football player
- Sidy Sarr (born 1996), Senegalese football player
- Sidy Sow (born 1998), Canadian American football player
