= Hirini Te Kani =

New Zealand tribal leader

Hirini Te Kani (?–1896) was a notable New Zealand tribal leader and soldier. Of Māori descent, he identified with the Ngāti Porou iwi.
