= Sidney Armor Reeve =

Sidney Armor Reeve (March 27, 1866, in Dayton, Ohio - June 12, 1941, in Nyack, NY) was a writer and professor of Steam and Hydraulic Engineering at the Worcester Polytechnic Institute between 1896-1906. During his time at Worcester Polytechnic Institute, Reeve was an active member in the Pi Iota Chapter of Phi Gamma Delta fraternity. He was employed as a consulting engineer in New York City between 1908 and 1932 and held over 50 patents on inventions.

== Biography ==
He founded the scientific field of social energetics, which was later expanded on by Frederick Soddy in his book The Role of Money.

He was inspired by reading Henry George to investigate sociology. He came to the conclusion that the same mathematics and reasoning applied equally to entropy, energy and thermodynamics in steam boilers as well as in the social body.

== Bibliography ==
- The cost of competition : an effort at the understanding of familiar facts
- Energy; work, heat and transformations
- The entropy-temperature analysis of steam-engine efficiencies
- Modern economic tendencies; an economic history of America
- Reeve's Plan for economic democracy
- The thermodynamics of heat-engines
