= Sidney Hauser =

American saxophonist

Sidney Hauser is an American saxophonist with the Seattle Repertory Jazz Orchestra.

== Early life and education ==
Hauser was raised on the south end of Whidbey Island in a community with a reputation for fostering art and music, often commuting by ferry to Seattle, Washington. Sidney attended South Whidbey High School where Chris Harshman as band director created an environment in which Hauser's interest and musical ability flourished, studying both clarinet and saxophone. During her senior year of high school in 2012, Sidney received best alto saxophone soloist award at the Bellevue College performing Georgia on My Mind http://www.southwhidbeyrecord.com/news/south-whidbey-jazz-students-win-awards-at-bellevue-college-fest-kudos/ also played at The North Shore Jazz Festival-(this performance of Georgia on My Mind can be found on youtube), competing against musicians from Seattle high schools such as Garfield High School and Roosevelt High School. Sidney had the great pleasure of performing on stage with Joshua Redman at South Whidbey High School who was there in a teaching capacity. Sidney then performed "When Sunny Gets Blue" at the Lionel Hampton Jazz Festival in Moscow, Idaho at which she got into the first place as an alto saxophone soloist. After the win, Sidney began to transcribe jazz rhythms from Sonny Stitt, Joshua Redman, Art Pepper, and Cannonball Adderley. Sidney also studied under Neil Welch and Mark Taylor.

== Education and career ==
After graduating from high school, Hauser auditioned and was accepted into the jazz program at the University of Washington. Although she took lessons with famous musicians such as Cuong Vu, Ted Poor, Bill Frisell and Marc Seales (who was her mentor at the time), Sidney took time away in an effort to find her jazz voice while continuing to exercise her artistry and was accepted into the University of Washington school of fine and visual arts. During this time Sidney continued to perform jazz in various venues in Seattle including performing with Seattle Women's Jazz Orchestra. In addition, Sidney spearheaded a band at this time which has now morphed into her current band SmackTalk often described as performing jazz funk fusion. Michael Brockman recognizing Sidney's talent invited her to fill the big shoes of Bill Ramsey who was retiring from the jazz community at the time. Hauser is often approached by audience members and budding musicians as a member of Seattle Repertory Jazz Orchestra (SRJO) who are inspired by her performances and inspired by her membership. Sidney has most recently recorded a video called BEAMS with her band SmackTalk (also available on youtube) and Sidney is looking forward to upcoming SRJO performances.

In 2018 Sidney performed with Dee Daniels, Kate Olson and Maria Schneider.
