= Sidney Pike =

British painter

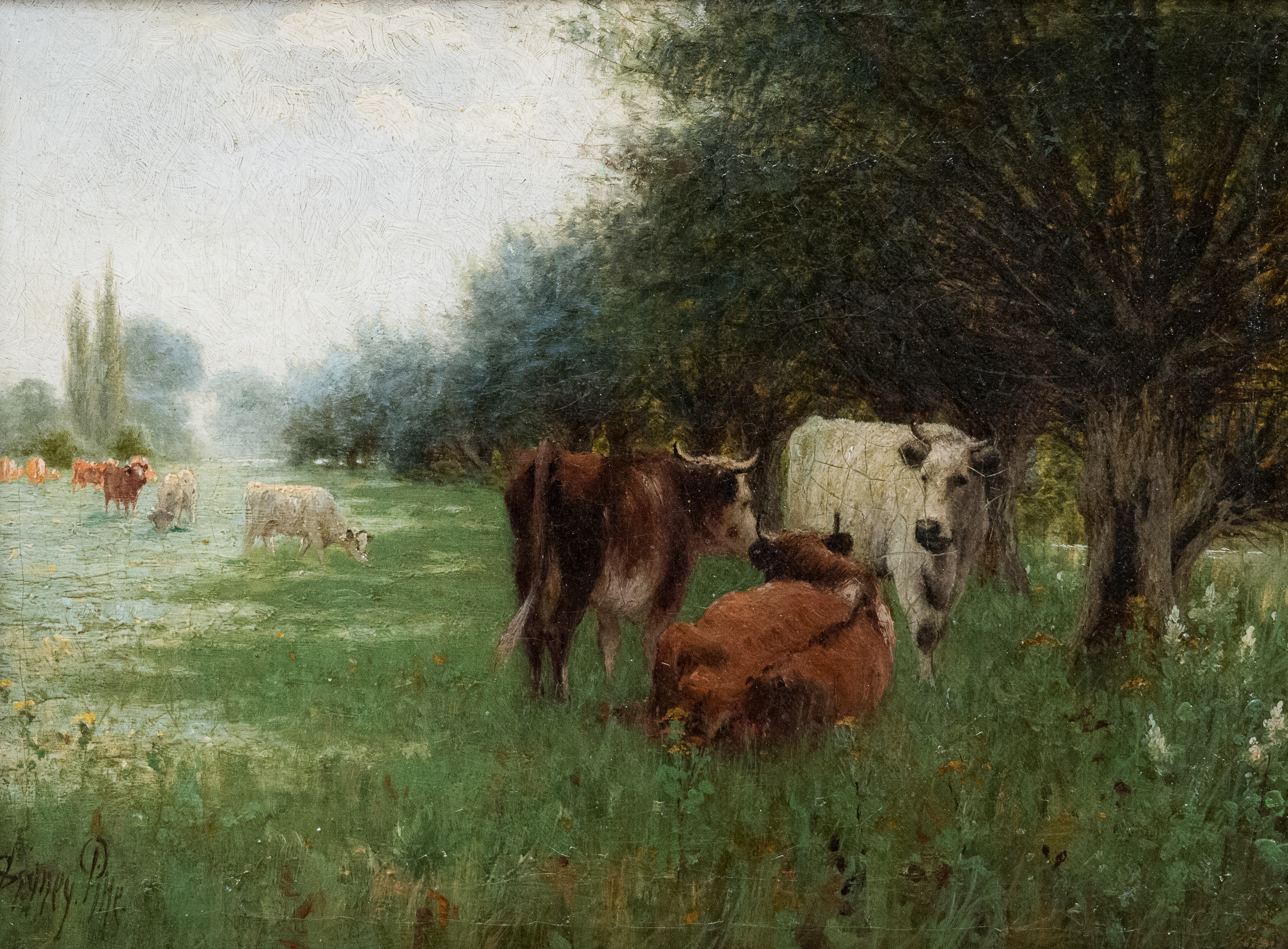
Summer Landscape With Cattle

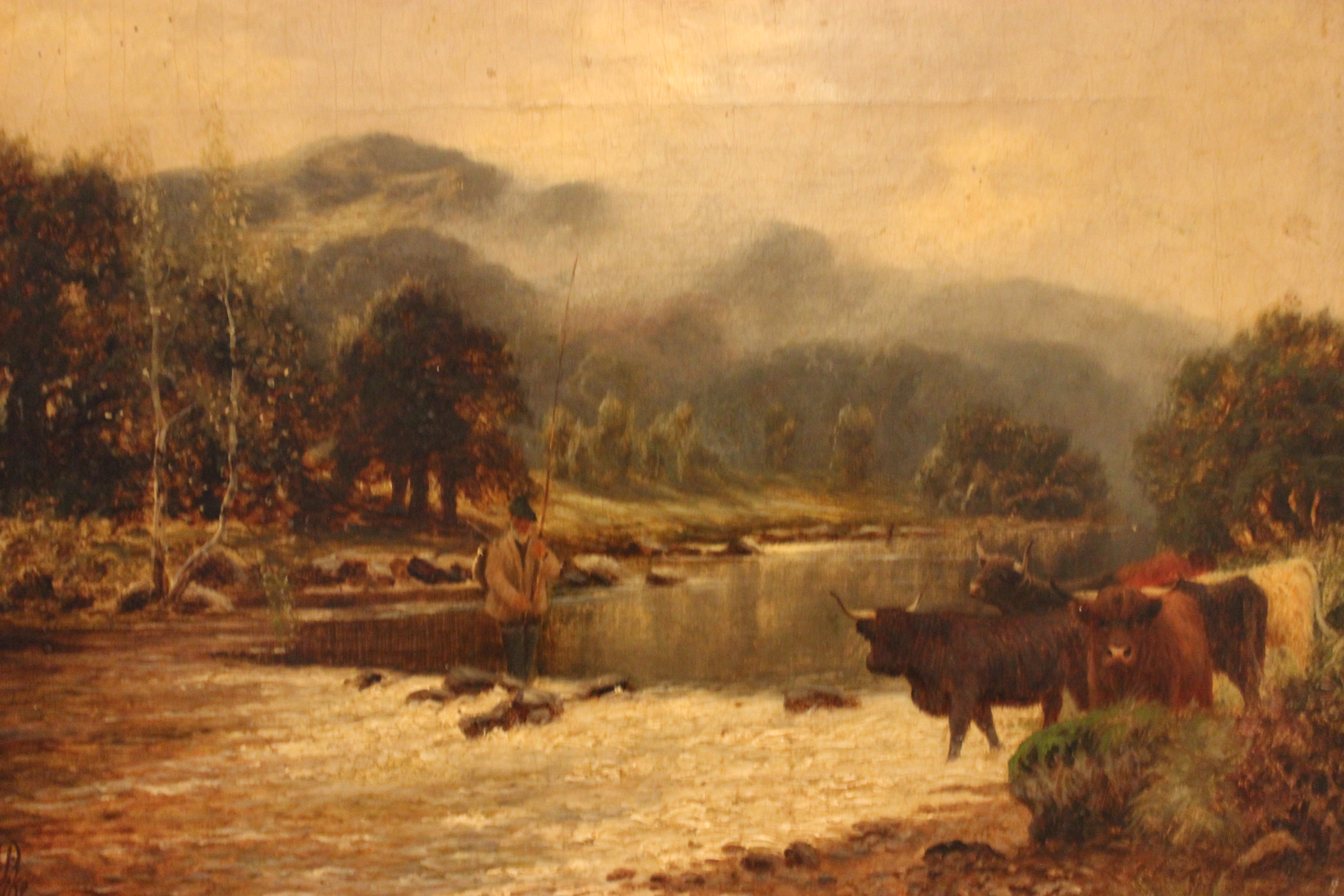
OIl on canvas typical of his style and subject

Sidney Pike was a British painter. He was born in January 1858 in Camberwell, Surrey, and died in December 1923 in Hastings, Sussex. Numerous works by the artist have been sold at auction, including A Winter's Day in the Woods sold at Christie's South Kensington "British & Victorian Pictures" sale in 2006 for $7,551. He lived a Bohemian life as befitted an artist in those days, flitting from one lodging to another, and made most of his money painting the grounds of stately homes for their owners. He was one of the first Christmas card painters for Collins Publishers. He eloped with the daughter of the publisher of the Evening Standard, with whom he had six children, several of whom painted, and one of whom, Stuart Nelson, wrote on railways.
