= Sidney Kennon =

Midwife and collector

Mrs. Kennon kept exotic animals such as this marmoset, which was drawn by the naturalist George Edwards — "the Original (now living) is the property of Mrs. Cannon, Midwife to her Royal Highness the Princess of Wales." Her parrot and lemur were also included in his work.

The Sanglin

That from which I drew my figure, was the property of the good and very obliging Mrs. Cannon, formerly midwife to the Royal Family, who informed me, that it fed on several sorts of things, as biscuits, fruits, greens, insects, snails, &c. and that once, when let loose, it suddenly snatched a Chinese Goldfish out of a basin of water, which it killed, and greedily devoured; after which she gave him small live eels, which frighted him at first, by their twisting round his neck, but he soon mastered them, and eat them.

— Gleanings of Natural History by George Edwards

Sidney Kennon, known as Mrs. Cannon (died 1754), was an 18th-century British midwife who delivered the babies of royalty and other great families. She collected numerous creatures, curiosities and specimens. Her collections were auctioned after her death and she left a large sum of money to promote the delivery of babies by women rather than men.

She was influential in the court of George II and delivered George III in 1738 as a baby for Queen Caroline. Charging up to 50 guineas for a delivery, she became rich. She lived near the court in Jermyn Street, where she entertained celebrities such as Frederick, Prince of Wales. She amassed a large collection of curiosities and objects of natural history. These included polyps and worms, which she studied with the president of the Royal Society, Martin Folkes. Other items included anatomical specimens; coins; medals; ethnographical items; shells; a crocodile given her by royal physician, Richard Mead; and the nightcap of Oliver Cromwell.

She died on 11 December 1754 at another residence in Clifford Street in Mayfair. As a dying gift, she presented royal physician Frank Nicholls with a bank note for the considerable sum of £500. This was to support his campaign against the delivery of babies by men. There was some controversy in the 18th century as to whether men should deliver babies. Objections included the indecency and indignity that men might inflict upon women and the damage that instruments such as forceps might do to both mother and child. Nicholls had criticised the practice in his pamphlet, The Petition of the unborn Babes to the Censors of the Royal College of Physicians. Mrs. Cannon's bequests enabled him to continue this work but it was not successful.

Her possessions were left to the divine, Arthur Young. Apart from her books about natural history, which were sold privately, the other possessions were sold in public auctions by Abraham Langford. Mrs. Delany wrote that the shells were to fetch £2,500. Horace Walpole bought a large lot at auction which he displayed in his gothic mansion of Strawberry Hill. He wrote about this in a letter to his cousin, Harry Conway, on 12 February 1756:

You would laugh if you saw in the midst of what trumpery I am writing. Two porters have just brought home my purchases from Mrs. Kennon the midwife's sale: Brobdignag combs, old broken pots, pans, and pipkins, a lantern of scraped oyster-shells, scimitars, Turkish pipes, Chinese baskets, &c. &c. My servants think my head is turned: I hope not: it is all to be called the personal estate and moveables of my great-great-grandmother, and to be reposited at Strawberry. I believe you think my letter as strange a miscellany as my purchases.

P.S. I forgot, that I was outbid for Oliver Cromwell's nightcap.
