= Annals of Tourism Research =

- Discipline: Tourism studies
- Language: English
- Edited by: Sara Dolnicar, Scott McCabe

Publication details
- History: 1973-present
- Publisher: Elsevier
- Frequency: Bimonthly
- Impact factor: 9.011 (2020)

Standard abbreviations
- ISO 4: Ann. Tour. Res.

Indexing
- ISSN: 0160-7383
- OCLC no.: 310964389

Links
- Journal homepage

The Annals of Tourism Research is a bimonthly peer-reviewed academic journal covering research on the academic aspects of tourism. According to the Journal Citation Reports, the journal has a 2020 impact factor of 9.011.

== History ==
The journal was established in 1973 with Jafar Jafari as the founding editor-in-chief.
