= Anatolia (journal) =

Academic journal of tourism and hospitality

- Discipline: Tourism, hospitality
- Language: English
- Edited by: Nazmi Kozak, Metin Kozak

Publication details
- History: 1990–present
- Publisher: Routledge

Standard abbreviations
- ISO 4: Anatolia

Indexing
- ISSN: 1303-2917 (print); 2156-6909 (web)

Links
- Journal homepage

Anatolia: An International Journal of Tourism and Hospitality Research is a journal in the field of tourism and hospitality. It is published by Routledge and is indexed in databases including Scopus, Emerging Sources Citation Index, International Bibliography of Periodical Literature and CAB International's Leisure, Recreation and Tourism Abstracts. It was established in 1990.
