= Journal of Travel Research =

- Discipline: Tourism
- Language: English
- Edited by: Geoffrey I. Crouch

Publication details
- Former names: Western Council for Travel Research Bulletin (1961–1969), Travel Research Bulletin (1970–1971)
- History: 1961–present
- Publisher: SAGE Publications for the Travel and Tourism Research Association
- Frequency: Bimonthly
- Impact factor: 5.169 (2017)

Standard abbreviations
- ISO 4: J. Travel Res.

Indexing
- ISSN: 0047-2875 (print); 1552-6763 (web)
- LCCN: 77647048
- OCLC no.: 647703441

Links
- Journal homepage; Online access; Online archive

The Journal of Travel Research is a bimonthly peer-reviewed academic journal covering tourism. The editor-in-chief is Geoffrey I. Crouch (La Trobe University, Australia). It was established in 1961 as the Western Council for Travel Research Bulletin, was renamed Travel Research Bulletin in 1970, and has been published under its present title since 1972. It is published by SAGE Publications in association with the Travel and Tourism Research Association.

== Abstracting and indexing ==
The journal is abstracted and indexed in Scopus and the Social Sciences Citation Index. According to the Journal Citation Reports, the journal has a 2017 impact factor of 5.169.
