= List of closed railway stations in London =

List of closed railway stations in London lists closed heavy rail passenger stations within the Greater London area. Stations served only by London Underground or its predecessors, by Tramlink, and by the Docklands Light Railway are not included.

== Scope ==
Each station has a major place name and a railway reference which is generally the founding company but it may be another interested company or a line. The stations' linked articles give more details. The full form of an abbreviation is seen by rolling over; linkage to "unwritten" articles and repeated linkage are retained to allow that.

"Replacement" is either a station which took over directly one closed, as King's Cross for Maiden Lane, or one built later at the same location as some DLR stations were, "+/-" after a replacement's name indicates that it was near the disused station but slightly displaced along the same path. Stations not replaced are marked "None".

Stations with the same name are differentiated, usually by company abbreviations as superscripts.

§ after a station name means renamed before closure. Some stations were renamed several times.
► after a replacement station means "later renamed as".
after a replacement name indicates a Tramlink tram stop rather than a station.
† after a grid reference shows site was not identified, only inferred from street names etc.

== Stations ==
Name at closure	Place	Replacement	Opened	Closed to passengers	Railway reference	Reference if not Wikipedia	Grid reference
Addiscombe§	Croydon	None	1864	1997	MKR		TQ337664
Alexandra Palace ^{(MHR)}	Muswell Hill	None	1873	1954	MHR	Wall (2003)	TQ294900
Angel Road§	Edmonton	Meridian Water	1840	2019	N&ER		TQ351922
Bandon Halt	Wallington	None	1906	1914	LB&SCR	Mitchell & Smith (1992)	TQ301644
Bath Road Halt	Chiswick	None	1909	1917	N&SWJR		TQ217790
Battersea	Battersea	None	1863	1940	WLER	Course (1962)	TQ269763
Battersea Park	Battersea	^{Grosvenor Road (LB&SCR side)}	1860	1870	LB&SCR	^{Originally "Battersea", Marshall (1963) has "Battersea" but Course (1962) has "Battersea Park and Steamboat Pier"}	TQ287776
Battersea Park Road	Battersea	Battersea Park	1867	1916	LC&DR	Course (1962)	TQ288771
Beckton	Beckton	Beckton ^{(DLR)} +/-	1874	1940	EC&TJR	Jackson (1978)	TQ438815
Beddington Lane§	Beddington	Beddington Lane	1855	1997	W&CR	Marshall (1963)	TQ293672
Belmont§	Belmont, Harrow	None	1932	1964	L&NWR	Course (1962)	TQ164905
Bingham Road	Croydon	Addiscombe +/-	1906	1983	W&SCR		TQ342662
Bishopsgate ^{(First site)}§	Shoreditch	L'pool St/B'gate (LL)	1840	1879	ECR		TQ335822
Bishopsgate ^{(ex Low Level)}§	Shoreditch	None	1872	1916	GER		TQ336822
Blackfriars Bridge	Southwark	Blackfriars	1864	1885	LCDR		TQ316806
Blackfriars Road	Southwark	^{Waterloo Junction ► Waterloo East}	1864	1868	SER	Course (1962)	TQ316800
Blackheath Hill	Greenwich	None	1871	1917	LC&DR		TQ380767
Blackwall	E. India Docks	None	1840	1926	L&BR	Course (1962)	TQ388808
Borough Road	Southwark	None	1864	1907	LC&DR		TQ320795
Bow	Bow	None	1850	1944	E&WID&BJR	Course (1962)	TQ373829
Bow Road ^{(2 sites)}	Bow	None	^{1876; 1892}	^{1892; 1949}	GER		^{1st TQ372828; 2nd TQ372829}
Brentford ^{(GWR)}	Brentford	None	^{1860; 1920}	^{1915; 1942}	GWR		TQ172773
Brentham for North Ealing and Greystoke Park§	Ealing	Hanger Lane	^{1911; 1920}	^{1915; 1947}	GWR		TQ175828^{†}
Bricklayers' Arms	Southwark	None	1844	1852	SER, L&CR		TQ335787
Broad Street	City	None	1865	1986	NLR		TQ331817
Brockley Lane	Brockley	None	1872	1917	LC&DR		TQ364759
Burdett Road	Mile End	None	1871	1941	L&BER	Course (1962)	TQ366818
Caledonian Road & Barnsbury^{(First site)}	Islington	^{Barnsbury ► Caledonian Road & Barnsbury, (2nd site)}	1852	1870	NLR		TQ306843
Camberwell§	Camberwell	None	1862	1916	LC&DR		TQ321768
Camden railway station ^{(L&B)}	Camden	Chalk Farm	1844	1852	L&BR	Chronology of London Railways and Forgotten Stations of Greater London	TQ285840^{†}
Camden Road ^{(MR)}	Camden Town	None	1868	1916	MR	Course (1962)	TQ297841^{†}
Canning Town ^{(NR side, 3 sites)}	Canning Town	Canning Town ^{(DLR); Stratford Extn from 2011}	^{1846; 1888; 1995}	^{1888; 1994; 2006}	EC&TJR		TQ393814^{†}
Cannon Street Road	Whitechapel	None	1842	1848	L&BR	Course (1962)	TQ346809
Central	Beckton Park	None	1880	1940	EC&TJR	Course (1962)	TQ425809
Central Croydon§	Croydon	None	^{1868; 1886}	^{1871; 1888}	LB&SCR		TQ323653
Chalk Farm§	Primrose Hill	None	1855	1915	L&NWR	Course (1962)	TQ279843
Chelsea & Fulham	Fulham	Imperial Wharf +/-	1863	1940	WLEJR		TQ258773
Church Manor Way Halt	Plumstead	None	1917	1919	SER	Course (1962)	TQ460789^{†}
Clapham Common ^{(L&SWR)}§	^{Wandsworth Common}	Clapham Junction	1838	1863	L&SWR	^{Course (1962); Marshall (1963)}	TQ270749
Coborn Road	Mile End	None	^{1865; 1919}	^{1916; 1946}	GER	Course (1962)	TQ366829
Commercial Docks	Southwark	Southwark Park	1856	1866	SER	^{Course (1962) has "Dock"}	TQ352784
Connaught Road	Canning Town	None	1880	1940	EC&TJR	Course (1962)	TQ414808
Coombe Road§	Croydon	Lloyd Park +/-	^{1885; 1935}	^{1916; 1983}	W&SCJR	Course (1962)	TQ335646
Coulsdon North§	Coulsdon	None	1899	1983	LB&SCR		TQ300597
Cowley	Cowley	None	1904	1962	GWR		TQ057823
Cranley Gardens	Muswell Hill	None	1902	1954	MHR	Course (1962)	TQ284891
Crouch End	Crouch End	None	1867	1954	GNR/EH&LR	Course (1962)	TQ299878
Crystal Palace (High Level)§	Crystal Palace	None	^{1865; 1919}	^{1917; 1954}	CP&SLJR	Course (1962)	TQ337708
Dalston Junction	Dalston	Dalston Junction	1865	1986	NLR		TQ335846
Devonshire Street	Shoreditch	^{Shoreditch (ECR), ► Bishopsgate (1st site)}	1839	1840	ECR		TQ356826
Dudding Hill§	Hendon	None	^{1875; 1893}	^{1888; 1902}	MR		TQ218854
East Brixton§	Brixton	None	1866	1976	LB&SCR		TQ315755
Edgware ^{(L&NER)}	Edgware	None	1867	1939	GNR/EH&LR		TQ194917
Eltham Park	Eltham	Eltham	1908	1985	SE&CR		TQ432750
Eltham Well Hall§	Eltham	Eltham	1895	1985	SE&CR		TQ423748
Finchley Road	St John's Wood	None	1868	1927	MR	Course (1962)	TQ261849
Gallions ^{(2 sites)}	Beckton	None	1880	1940	EC&TJR		TQ439806; TQ442806
Globe Road	Stepney	None	1884	1916	GER		TQ354825
Greenwich Park§	Greenwich	None	1888	1917	LC&DR		TQ382774
Grosvenor Road ^{(LB&SCR side)}	Pimlico	None	1870	1907	LB&SCR	Course (1962)	TQ287779
Grosvenor Road ^{(LC&DR side)}	Pimlico	None	1867	1911	LC&DR	Course (1962)	TQ287779
Haggerston ^{(NLR)}	Haggerston	Haggerston ^{(LO)} +/-	1865	1940	NLR		TQ337839
Hammersmith (Grove Road)	Hammersmith	None	1869	1916	L&SWR		TQ232787
Hammersmith & Chiswick§	Chiswick	None	1858	1917	N&SWJR		TQ216787
Hampstead Road ^{(First site)}	Camden Town	^{2nd site ► Chalk Farm ► Primrose Hill}	1851	1855	NLR		TQ286841
Harlesden ^{(MR)}	Harlesden	None	1875	1902	MR		TQ210838
Haverstock Hill	Gospel Oak	None	1868	1916	MR	Course (1962)	TQ279853
Heathrow Junction	Hayes	Heathrow Central	1998	1998	Heathrow Express		TQ077793
Hendon Factory Platform	Hendon	None	1918	1919	MR		TQ077793
Highgate Road ^{High Level}	Kentish Town	None	1868	1915	T&HJR	Course (1962)	TQ285857
Highgate Road ^{Low Level}	Kentish Town	None	1900	1918	T&HJR	Course (1962)	TQ286857
Holborn Viaduct	City	City Thameslink	1874	1990	LC&DR		TQ316814
Holborn Viaduct (Low Level)§	City	None	1874	1916	LC&DR		TQ316815^{†}
Holloway & Caledonian Road	Holloway	None	1852	1915	GNR		TQ308854
Honor Oak	Honor Oak	None	^{1865; 1919; 1946}	^{1917; 1944; 1954}	CP&SLJR	Marshall (1963)	TQ350740
Hornsey Road	Finsbury Park	None	1872	1943	T&HJR		TQ302871
Junction Road§	Tufnell Park	None	1872	1943	T&HJR	Course (1962)	TQ293861
Kensal Green & Harlesden	Kensal Green	Kensal Rise	1861	1873	NLR		TQ225830
Kew	Brentford	^{Kew Bridge (N&SWJR)}	1853	1866	N&SWJR	Course (1962)	TQ187782^{†}
Kew Bridge ^{(N&SWJR)}	Kew Bridge	None	1862	1940	N&SWJR	Course (1962)	TQ190782
King's Cross Thameslink§	Kings Cross	^{St Pancras (Thameslink platforms)}	1863	2007	MetR		TQ304829
King's Cross York Road	Kings Cross		1863	1976	GNR		TQ302833
Kingston ^{(First location)}	Surbiton	^{Kingston (2nd location) ► Surbiton}	1838	1845	L&SWR	Marshall (1963)	TQ186676^{†}
Lea Bridge§	Lea Bridge	Lea Bridge	1840	1985	N&ER		TQ362872
Leman Street	Shadwell	None	^{1877; 1919}	^{1916; 1941}	L&BR		TQ342809
Lewisham Road	Lewisham	None	1871	1917	LC&DR		TQ374762
Limehouse ^{(L&BR)}	Limehouse	Westferry ^{DLR} +/-	1840	1926	L&BR		TQ367809^{†}
London Necropolis ^{(2 sites)}	Lambeth	None	^{1854; 1902}	^{1902; 1941}	LNC		^{1st TQ309796; 2nd TQ309795}
Lordship Lane	East Dulwich	None	1865	1954	CP&SLJR		TQ346731
Lower Edmonton^{(Low Level)}	Edmonton	None	1849	1939	ECR		TQ343936
Ludgate Hill	City	None	1865	1929	LC&DR		TQ317810
Maiden Lane^{(GNR)}	Islington	King's Cross	1850	1852	GNR		
Maiden Lane^{(NLR)}	Islington	None	1850	1916/7?	E&WID&BJR		TQ299841
Manor Way	East Ham	None	1880	1940	EC&TJR		TQ436807^{†}
Merton Abbey	Merton	None	^{1868; 1923}	^{1916; 1929}	TM&WR	^{Course (1962) &}	TQ266699
Merton Park§	Merton	Merton Park	1868	1997	TM&WR		TQ252697
Mildmay Park	Dalston	None	1869	1934	NLR		TQ327845
Mile End	Mile End	^{Bethnal Green Jn ► Bethnal Green}	1843	1872	ECR	Course (1962)	TQ350823
Mill Hill, The Hale	Mill Hill	None	1906	1939	GNR		TQ213917
Millwall Docks	Isle of Dogs	Crossharbour ^{DLR} +/-	1871	1926	L&BR		TQ378794^{†}
Millwall Junction	Poplar	None	1871	1926	L&BR		TQ379806^{†}
Minories	Minories	^{1841 Fenchurch Street; 1987 Tower G'y (DLR)}	^{1840; 1849}	^{1849; 1853}	Com^{l} R^{y}		TQ337808
Mitcham	Mitcham	Mitcham	1855	1997	W&CR		TQ272681
Morden Road	Merton	Morden Road	1855	1997	W&CR		TQ257693
Muswell Hill	Muswell Hill	None	1873	1954	MHR		TQ284891
New Wandsworth	Wandsworth	Wandsworth Common	1858	1869	WEL&CPR	Quick (2002)	TQ269749
Nine Elms	Nine Elms	^{Waterloo Bridge ► Waterloo}	1838	1848	L&SotonR^{y}	Course (1962)	TQ298777
Noel Park & Wood Green§	Wood Green	None	1878	1963	GER		TQ312902
North Acton^{(GWR side)}	Acton	North Acton^{(LU)}	1904	1947	GWR		TQ208819
North Greenwich ^{(L&BR)}	North Greenwich	Island Gardens ^{(DLR)}	1872	1926	L&BR		TQ382784
North Woolwich	North Woolwich	None	1847	2006	EC&TJR		TQ432797
Old Ford	Old Ford	None	1850	1944	E&WID&BJR	Course (1962)	TQ370837
Old Kent Road	Bermondsey	None	1866	1917	LB&SCR		
Old Oak Lane Halt	Harlesden	None	1906	1947	GWR	Course (1962)	TQ212818
Palace Gates (Wood Green)	Wood Green	None	1878	1963	GER		TQ303907
Park Royal	Park Royal	None	^{1903; 1904}	^{1903; 1937}	GWR		TQ197823
Park Royal West Halt	Park Royal	None	1932	1947	Great Western Railway		TQ189825
Perivale Halt	Ealing	Perivale	1904	1947	Great Western Railway		TQ162833
Pimlico	Battersea	Battersea Park (1860)	1858	1860	LB&SCR	Course (1962)	
Poplar ^{(L&BR) First Site}	Poplar	Poplar ^{(L&BR) 2nd Site}	1840	1845	L&BR		TQ384806
Poplar ^{(L&BR) Second Site}	Poplar	Blackwall ^{(DLR)}	1845	1926	L&BR		TQ384806
Poplar (East India Dock Road)	Poplar	All Saints ^{(DLR)}	1850	1944	E&WID&BJR		TQ379809
Primrose Hill§	Primrose Hill	None	1855	1992	NLR		TQ279843
Queens Road (Built, not opened)	Hackney Downs	-------	~~1872~~	~~1872~~	GER	Course (1962)	TQ346859^{†}
Royal Oak ^{(BR side)}	Westbourne Green	Royal Oak ^{(LU)}	1838	1871	GWR		TQ258815^{†}
Rugby Road Halt	Chiswick	None	1909	1917	N&SWJR		TQ210797^{†}
Ruislip Gardens ^{(GCR/GWR)}	Ruislip	Ruislip Gardens ^{(LU)}	1908	1958	GCR/GWR		TQ102858
St Ann's Road	Tottenham	None	1882	1942	T&HJR		TQ330884
St Quintin Park and Wormwood Scrubs	North Kensington	None	1871	1940	WLL		TQ231815
Selsdon ^{(LB&SCR side)}§	Croydon	None	^{1885; 1919}	^{1917; 1959}	LB&SCR		TQ329637
Selsdon ^{(SER side)}§	Croydon	None	1885	1983	W&SCJR		TQ329637
Shadwell ^{(L&NER)}§	Shadwell	Shadwell ^{DLR} +/-	^{1840; 1919}	^{1916; 1941}	L&BR		TQ350810
Shepherd's Bush ^{(L&SWR)}	Shepherd's Bush	None	1869	1916	L&SWR	Marshall (1963)	TQ234796
Shern Hall Street	Walthamstow	Wood Street	1870	1873	GER	Brown (2015)	TQ38128923
Shoreditch ^{(NLR)}	Shoreditch	^{Shoreditch Hi. St (LO)+/−}	1865	1940	NLR		TQ333826
Silvertown§	Silvertown		1863	2006	EC&TJR		TQ420801
Smallberry Green§	Isleworth	Isleworth +/-	1849	1850	L&SWR		TQ159767
South Bromley	Bromley-by-Bow	Langdon Park ^{DLR} +/-	1850	1944	E&WID&BJR		TQ378816
South Dock	Isle of Dogs	None	1871	1926	L&BR	Klapper (1976)	TQ380800
South Harefield Halt§	Ruislip	None	1928	1931	GW&GCJR		TQ061874
Southwark Park	Southwark	None	1902	1915	L&GR		TQ349786^{†}
Spa Road ^{(First site)}	Southwark	^{2nd site ► Spa Road & Bermondsey 1877}	^{1836; 1838}	^{1842; 1872}	L&GR	^{Course (1962); Connor & Halford (??)}	TQ340793^{†}
Spa Road & Bermondsey	Southwark	None	1872	1915	L&GR		TQ342791^{†}
Spencer Road Halt	Croydon	None	1885	1915	W&SCR		TQ333643
Stanmore Village	Stanmore	None	1890	1952	L&NWR		TQ168917
Stewart's Lane^{(WELCR)}	Battersea	None	1858	1858	WEL&CPR		TQ29077689^{†}
Stewart's Lane^{(LCDR)}	Battersea	None	1863	1867	LCDR		TQ29117672^{†}
Stratford ^{(LL) (NLL)}	Stratford	^{Stratford DLR LL from 2011}	1846	2009	EC&TJR		TQ385843
Stratford Market§	Stratford	^{Stratford High Street DLR from 2011}	1846	1957	EC&TJR		TQ387840
Stroud Green	Stroud Green	None	1881	1954	GNR	Course (1962)	TQ308877
Tidal Basin	Canning Town	None	1858	1943	EC&TJR	Course (1962)	TQ398808^{†}
Tooting Junction ^{(First site)}	Tooting	^{Tooting Jn. 2nd site ► Tooting in 1938}	1868	1894	TM&WR		TQ277705
Trumpers Crossing Halt§	Southall	None	^{1904; 1920}	^{1915; 1926}	GWR		TQ152791
Twyford Abbey Halt	Ealing	Brentham	1904	1911	GWR		TQ181827
Upper Sydenham	Sydenham	None	1865	1954	CP&SLJR		TQ343719
Uxbridge High Street	Uxbridge	None	^{1907; 1920}	^{1917; 1939}	GWR		TQ052845^{†}
Uxbridge Road	Shepherd's Bush	Shepherd's Bush^{(WLL)}	1869	1940	WLL	Course (1962)	TQ237799
Uxbridge Vine Street§	Uxbridge	None	1856	1962	GWR		TQ055837
Victoria Park	Hackney Wick	Hackney Wick	1856	1943/4/5?	E&WID&BJR	Course (1962)?	TQ367845
Waddon Marsh	Croydon	Waddon Marsh +/	1930	1997	W&SR		TQ309660
Walworth Road§	Southwark	None	1863	1916	LC&DR		TQ323778
Waterloo International	Lambeth	St Pancras International	1994	2007	Eurostar		TQ309799
Welsh Harp	Barnet	None	1870	1903	MR		TQ225876^{†}
Wembley Stadium§	Wembley	None	1923	1969	GCR/L&NER		TQ197858
West Green	Tottenham	None	1878	1963	GER		TQ324894
West Ham ^{(NLL)}	West Ham	^{West Ham (DLR) from 2011}	1979	2006	EC&TJR		TQ390304
West India Docks	Isle of Dogs	None	1840	1926	L&BR	Course (1962)	TQ372807
Westbourne Park ^{(BR side)}§	N Kensington	Westbourne Park ^{(LU)}	1871	1992	GWR		TQ247818
Willesden	^{Acton Lane, Willesden}	^{1866 Willesden Jn; 1912 Harlesden}	^{1841; 1844}	^{1841; 1866}	L&BR	Course (1962)	TQ209832^{†}
Woodside§	Croydon	Woodside	1871	1997	SER		TQ347671
Woodstock Road Halt	Chiswick	None	1909	1917	N&SWJR		TQ213794

== See also ==
- Closed London Underground stations
- List of closed railway stations in Britain
- List of London railway stations
- List of London Underground stations
- List of Docklands Light Railway stations
- Tramlink
- Category:Lists of railway stations in the United Kingdom
