= Battersea Park railway station (1860–1870) =

Disused railway station in Battersea, London

Battersea Park
- Interactive map of Battersea Park

General information
- Location: Battersea
- Owner: London, Brighton and South Coast Railway
- Number of platforms: 2

Key dates
- 1860: Opened
- 1870: Closed

Other information
- Coordinates: 51.483175°N 0.147742°W

Battersea Park (originally Battersea) was a railway station on the London, Brighton and South Coast Railway (LB&SCR) located close to the River Thames immediately to the south of Victoria Railway Bridge (now Grosvenor Bridge) on the east side of Battersea Park in Battersea, south-west London.

== History ==
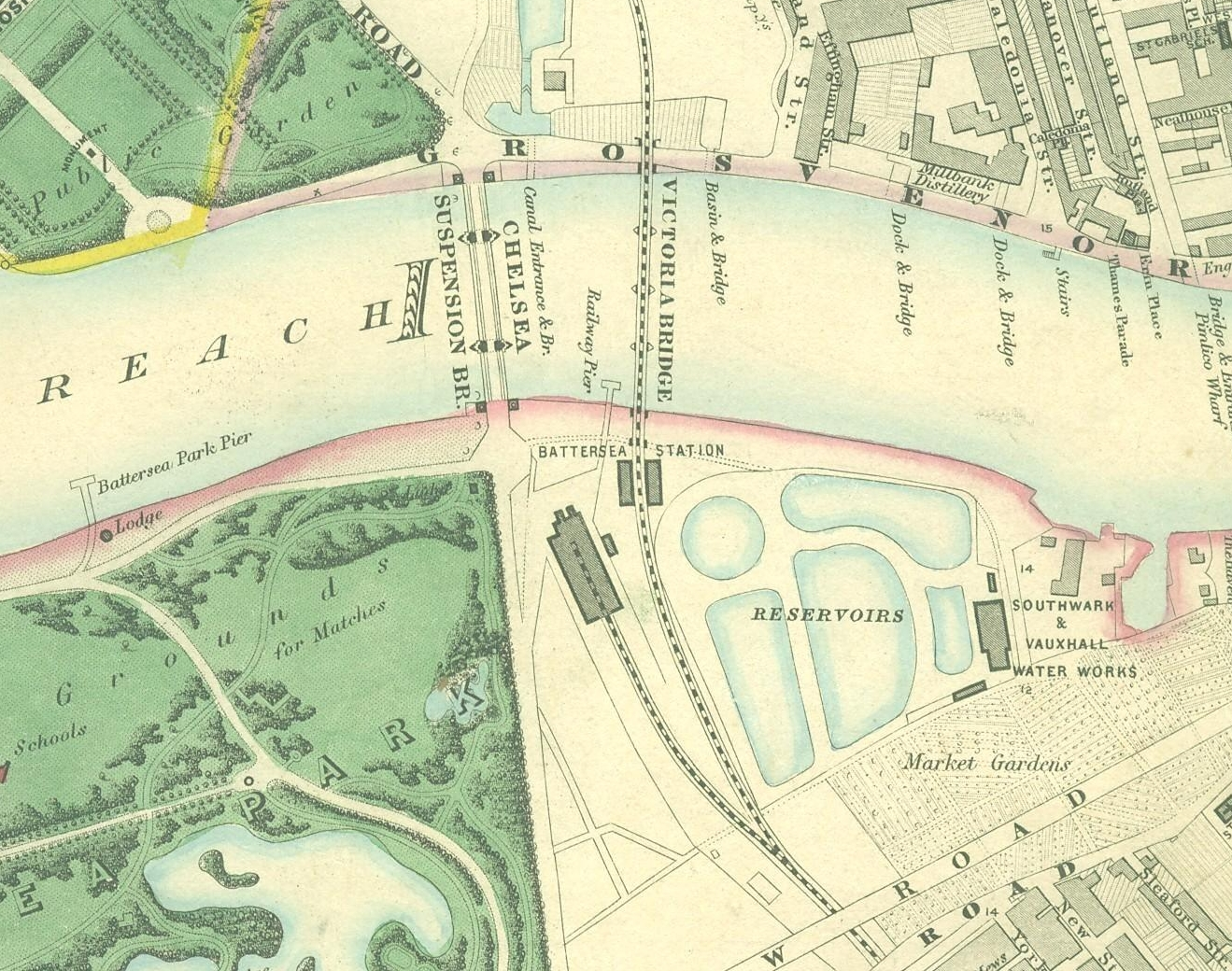
Battersea Park station with its original name, 1862

It opened on 1 October 1860 as a through station replacement for the nearby "Pimlico" terminus. It changed its name to "Battersea Park" on 1 July 1862, and was also called "Battersea Park and Steamboat Pier station". The station was closed on 1 November 1870 when the LB&SCR started to use Grosvenor Road railway station on the north side of the river. After closure, the station was still listed as a booking point for passengers on river steamers, who would have needed to walk across the bridge to Grosvenor Road for a train connection.

The station should not be confused with the current Battersea Park station, opened as "York Road" in 1867, or with another station named "Battersea" on the West London Extension Railway that was opened in 1863 and closed in 1940.

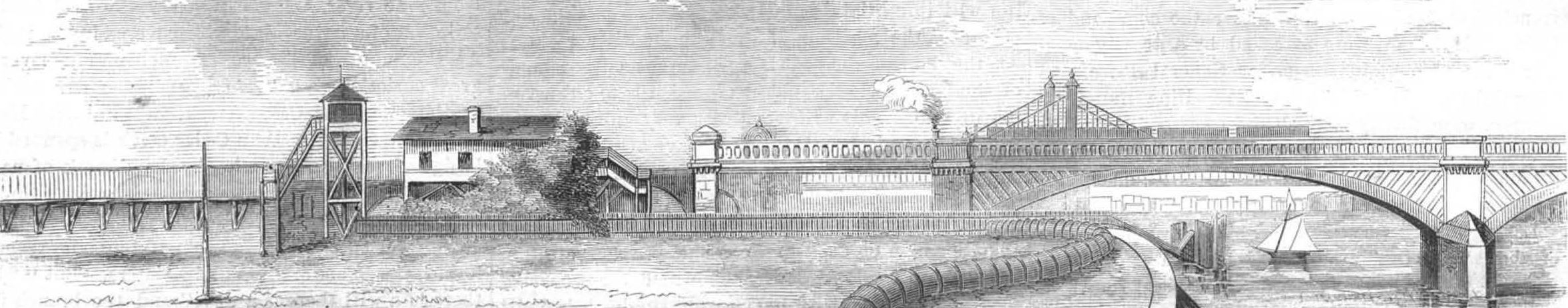
Battersea Park railway station in 1861, at the southern end of Grosvenor Bridge

== See also ==
- Battersea Park Road railway station

Preceding station	Historical railways	Following station
London Victoria	London, Brighton & South Coast Railway (1863-1867)	Wandsworth Road
London Victoria	London, Brighton & South Coast Railway (1867-1870)	Battersea Park
