= Battersea railway station =

Disused railway station in Battersea, London

Battersea
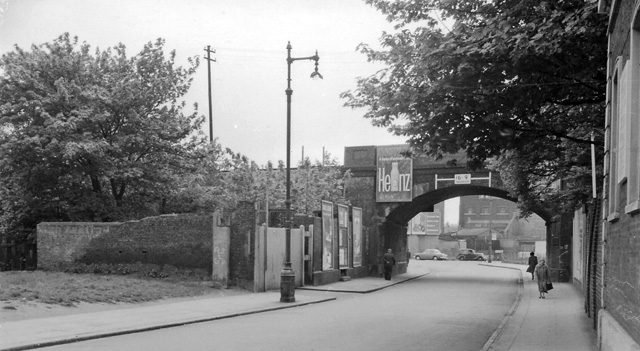
- Site of Battersea railway station in 1962
- Interactive map of Battersea

General information
- Location: Battersea
- Owner: West London Extension Railway

Key dates
- 1863: Opened
- 1940: Closed

Other information
- Coordinates: 51.47152°N 0.17219°W

Battersea was a railway station on the West London Extension Railway located on Battersea High Street in Battersea, south-west London. Built at the request of the parishioners of Battersea, it opened on 2 March 1863. To prevent overloading the embankment, it was built of wood, with brick pillars under the platforms and structures, but was laid with broad gauge track, because the WLER carried GWR trains. It closed on 14 September 1940 or 21 October 1940 after air raid damage during the Blitz of World War II.

The station was south of Battersea Railway Bridge, at the end of the now pedestrianised area of Battersea High Street by the junction with Simpson Street. It was demolished after closure and no remains are visible today. The site, and an access route from Gwynne Road, continue to remain the property of Network Rail, allowing for potential reconstruction should the need arise in future.

It should not be confused with another station originally opened as "Battersea" on 1 October 1860 (along with Victoria station), but was renamed on 1 July 1862 to "Battersea Park", and located on the London, Brighton and South Coast Railway, adjacent to the pier on the south bank of the River Thames, next to Victoria Railway Bridge. It closed on 1 November 1870.

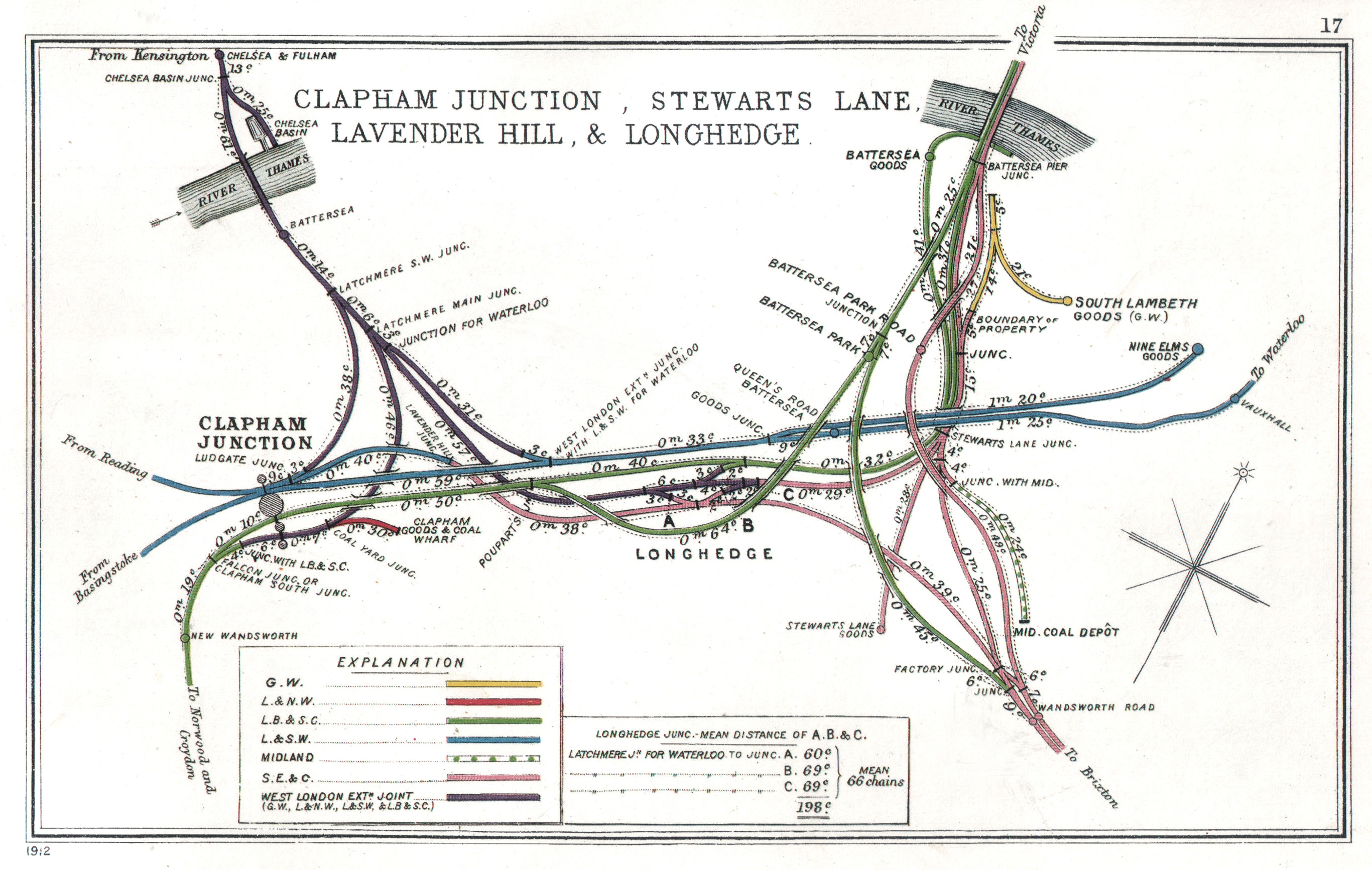
A 1912 Railway Clearing House map of lines around Battersea railway station

== See also ==
- Battersea Park railway station
- Battersea Park Road railway station

== Sources ==
- Faulkner, J. N. (1991). Clapham Junction. Rail Centres. London: Ian Allan. ISBN 978-0-7110-2026-9.
- Quick, Michael (2023) [2001]. Railway passenger stations in Great Britain: a chronology (PDF). version 5.05. Railway & Canal Historical Society.
- Sherwood, Tim (1994). Change at Clapham Junction : The Railways of Wandsworth and South West London. Wandsworth: Wandsworth Borough Council Leisure and Amenity Services Department. ISBN 0-902837-26-5.

Preceding station	Historical railways	Following station
Clapham Junction	West London Line; 1863-1940	Chelsea & Fulham
Waterloo	London and South Western Railway; 1869-1916	Chelsea & Fulham
