= Wandsworth Common railway station =

National rail station in London, England

Wandsworth Common
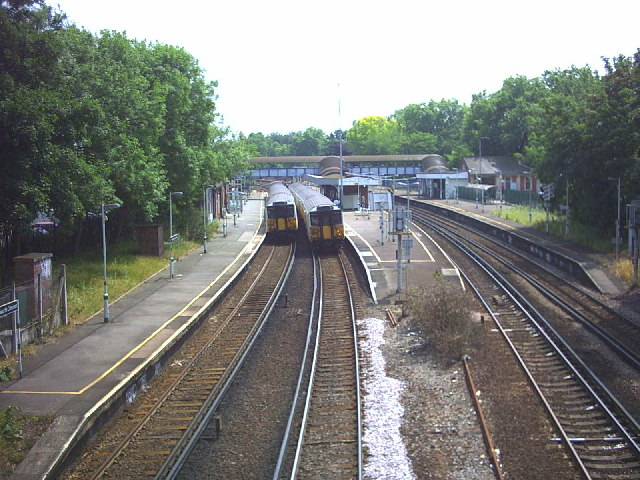
- Interactive map of Wandsworth Common

General information
- Location: Wandsworth Common
- Local authority: Wandsworth
- Managed by: Southern
- Station code: WSW
- DfT category: D
- Number of platforms: 4 (2 of which are rarely used)
- Fare zone: 3

National Rail annual entry and exit
- 2020–21: ▼0.401 million
- 2021–22: ▲0.676 million
- 2022–23: ▲0.747 million
- 2023–24: ▲0.885 million
- 2024–25: ▲0.962 million

Key dates
- 1 December 1856: Opened (first station on different site)
- 1 June 1858: closed
- 1 November 1869: present station opened

Other information
- External links: Departures; Facilities
- Coordinates: 51.4464°N 0.1635°W

Wandsworth Common railway station is in the London Borough of Wandsworth in south London. It is 4 miles 5 chains (6.5 km) down the line from London Victoria.

The station and all trains serving it are operated by Southern, and it is in London fare zone 3.

== History ==
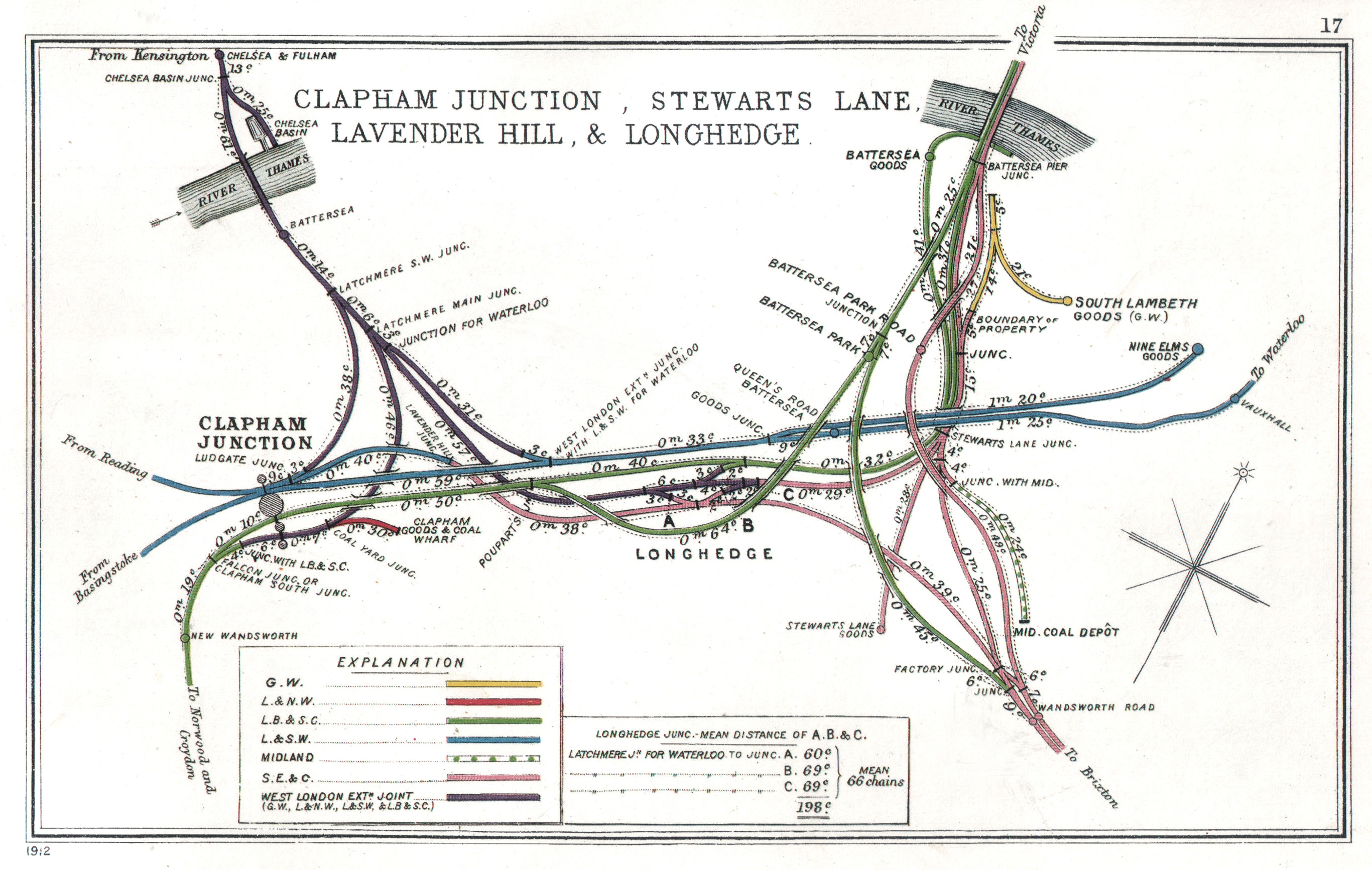
A 1912 Railway Clearing House map of lines around Wandsworth Common railway station

The West End of London and Crystal Palace Railway (WELCR) opened the first station as Wandsworth slightly to the north of the present station on 1 December 1856. From the outset the line was worked by the London, Brighton and South Coast Railway (LB&SCR), and then only ran to and from Crystal Palace. There were plans to extend it to join with the London and South Western Railway (L&SWR) main line nearby, thereby providing access to London Waterloo station, but these were rejected by that railway. It was renamed Wandsworth Common on 1 January 1858 before closing later that year on 1 June 1858. It was replaced by a station named New Wandsworth which had opened on 29 March 1858 when the (WELCR) extended its line to Pimlico, and it was purchased by the LB&SCR.

The station at New Wandsworth was closed when the present Wandsworth Common was opened at its current location by the LB&SCR on 1 November 1869 as part of works to widen the line, and improve the route between East Croydon and Victoria. Further remodelling of the line was undertaken in 1890 to increase capacity.

The lines through the station to Crystal Palace were electrified on 12 May 1911, by means of the LB&SCR 'Elevated Electric' overhead system. Work on electrifying the remaining services through the station had begun in 1913 but was interrupted by the First World War and not completed until 1925. By this time the LB&SCR was absorbed into the Southern Railway following the Railways Act 1921.

In 1925 the Southern Railway decided to adopt a third rail electrification system and the lines through the station were converted between June 1928 and September 1929.

When sectorisation was introduced in the 1980s, the national rail lines were served by Network SouthEast until the privatisation of the British Railways.

Upon privatisation in the 1990s, the national rail lines came under the Connex South Central franchise, which was replaced by the current operator in 2000.

On 10 March 1992 a Provisional IRA bomb by the station damaged trackside equipment.

== Services ==
All services at Wandsworth Common are operated by Southern using Class 377 EMUs.

The typical off-peak service in trains per hour is:

- 4 tph to London Victoria
- 2 tph to London Bridge via Forest Hill
- 2 tph to Epsom Downs via Norbury

During the peak hours, the station is served by an additional half-hourly service between London Victoria and Sutton, as well as one train to East Croydon.

Preceding station	National Rail	Following station
Clapham Junction	Southern Brighton Main Line Stopping Services	Balham

== Connections ==
London Buses routes 319 and G1 serve the station.

== See also ==
- Wandsworth Town railway station
