= Grosvenor Road railway station =

Former railway station in England

Grosvenor Road
- Map showing station in 1889
- Interactive map of Grosvenor Road

General information
- Location: Pimlico
- Local authority: City of Westminster
- Owners: London, Chatham and Dover Railway; London, Brighton and South Coast Railway

Key dates
- 1 November 1867: Opened (LC&DR)
- 1 November 1870: Opened (LB&SCR)
- 1 April 1907: Closed (LB&SCR)
- 1 October 1911: Closed (LC&DR)

Other information
- Coordinates: 51°29′10″N 0°08′49″W

Grosvenor Road station was a railway station in London located at the north end of Grosvenor Bridge on the approach tracks to Victoria station. Victoria station was originally operated as two separate parts served by the London, Chatham and Dover Railway (LC&DR) and the London, Brighton and South Coast Railway (LB&SCR) and Grosvenor Road station was also operated in this way. The LC&DR station operated between 1867 and 1911 and the LB&SCR station operated between 1870 and 1907. The station building of the LC&DR station remains on the eastern side of the tracks adjacent to Grosvenor Road (A3212) although no platforms remain at the elevated track level.

== History ==
In 1879 the LCDR was running the following services that stopped at Grosvenor Road:

- Frequent trains between Moorgate and Victoria, calling at all stations (Note: Trains called at Moorgate Street, Aldersgate Street, Snow Hill, Ludgate Hill, Blackfriars, Borough Road, Elephant and Castle, Walworth Road, Camberwell, Loughborough Junction, Brixton and South Stockwell, Clapham and North Stockwell, Wandsworth Road, Battersea Park Road, Grosvenor Road and Victoria)
- Through trains from Kentish Town to Victoria, calling at all stations (Note: Trains called at Kentish Town, King's Cross (York Road), King's Cross (Metropolitan), Farringdon Street, Snow Hill then as for the Moorgate to Victoria service.)

In 1879 the LBSCR ran the following service that stopped at Grosvenor Road:

- London Bridge to Victoria via Denmark Hill (South London line) service every 20 minutes
- London Bridge to Victoria via Crystal Palace service every half-hour

| Preceding station | Disused railways | Following station |
|---|---|---|
| London Victoria | London, Brighton and South Coast Railway; Main Line | Battersea Park |
| London Victoria | London, Chatham and Dover Railway; Main Line | Battersea Park Road |
