= Chelsea & Fulham railway station =

Former railway station in England

Chelsea & Fulham
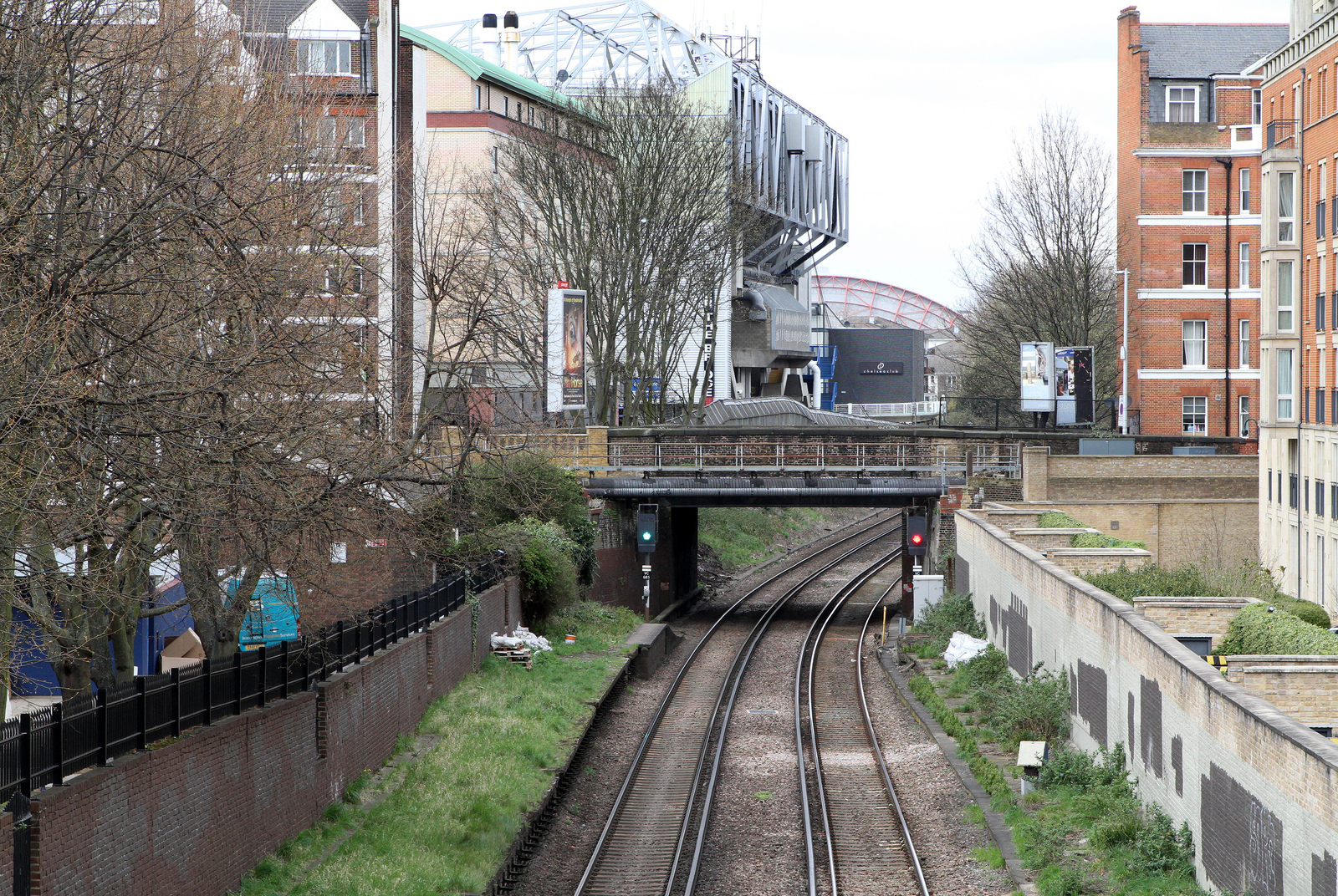
- The West London Line passing through Fulham at the site of the former station
- Interactive map of Chelsea & Fulham

General information
- Location: Walham Green
- Local authority: Hammersmith & Fulham
- Grid reference: TQ2588777254
- Number of platforms: 2

Railway companies
- Original company: West London Railway
- Pre-grouping: West London Railway
- Post-grouping: West London Railway

Key dates
- 2 March 1863: Opened as Chelsea
- 25 November 1902: Renamed Chelsea & Fulham
- 21 October 1940: Closed
- c.1950: Demolished

Other information
- Coordinates: 51.480267°N 0.18749°W

Chelsea & Fulham was a railway station in Walham Green in the London Borough of Hammersmith and Fulham, west London. It was situated between the King's Road and Fulham Road, on the present-day West London line. The station was opened in 1863 by the West London Railway, and was closed in 1940 having sustained damage during the Blitz of World War II.

== History ==
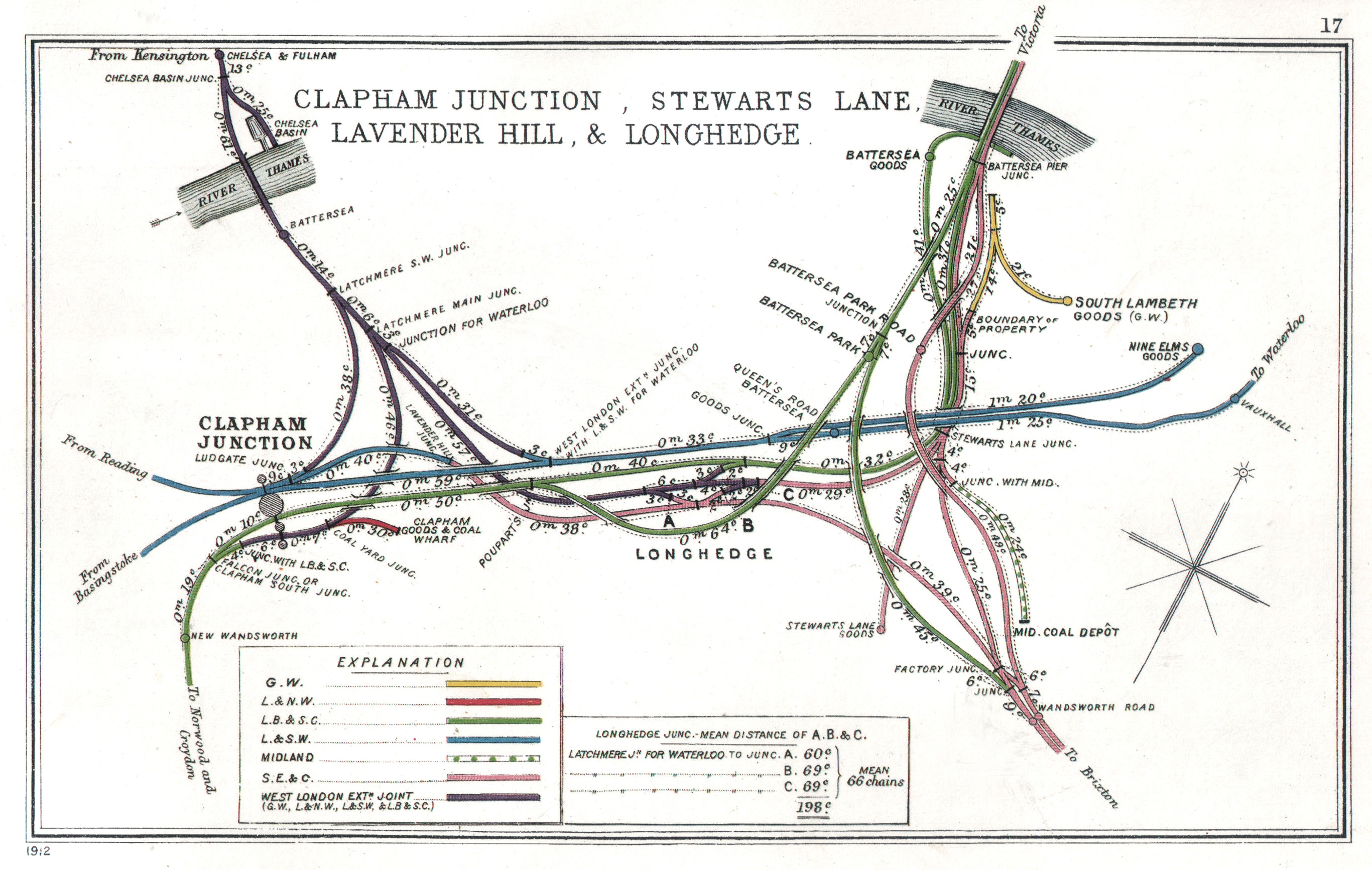
A 1912 Railway Clearing House map of lines around Chelsea & Fulham

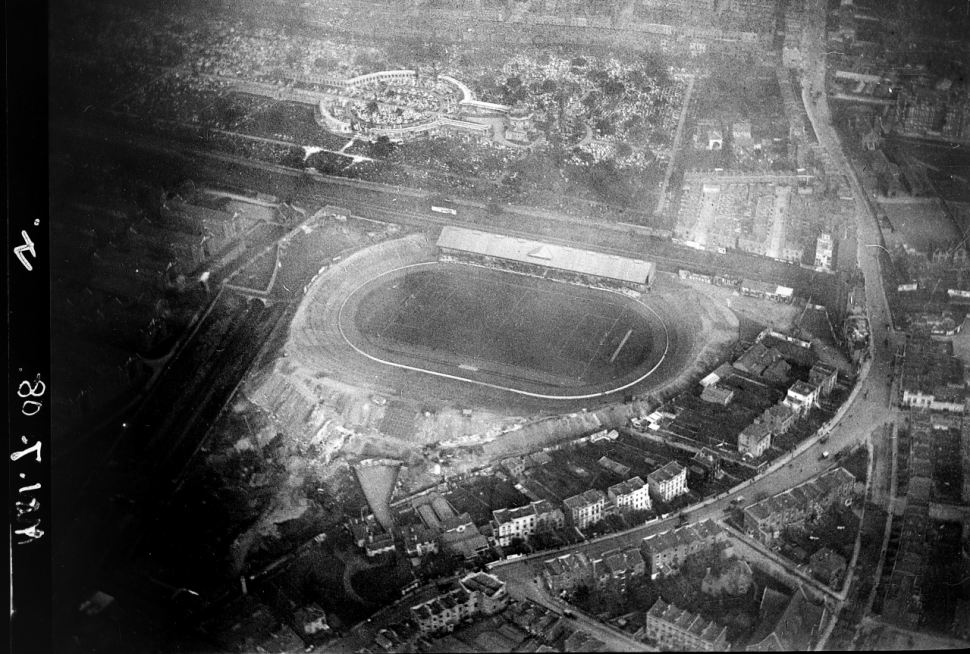
Aerial photo of Stamford Bridge Athletic Ground, Chelsea, in 1909. Chelsea & Fulham is to the right

Chelsea was one of the original stations on the West London Railway (WLR) and opened at the same time as the line, on 2 March 1863. The station was located in a cutting between two road bridges over Fulham Road and the King's Road, with entrances on both sides. In 1882 a new booking office and subsequently a footbridge were added at the south end of the station. It was renamed Chelsea & Fulham on 25 November 1902.

The station became very popular when Chelsea Football Club came into existence in 1905 and began playing at the Stamford Bridge Athletic Ground, and portable booking offices had to be used to cope with the demand on match days, when special football trains were chartered to bring fans to the ground. In 1930 the platforms were lengthened to cope with this extra demand. According to the sports history writer Tim Harris, the station was the inspiration for naming the football club; the entrepreneur and founder of the club, Gus Mears, had considered Stamford Bridge FC, Kensington FC, and London FC, but chose Chelsea FC because of its proximity to Chelsea & Fulham station and in spite of the stadium not actually being located in Chelsea proper.

After a period of heavy passenger usage, it began to dwindle in popularity as competition from the new deep-level Underground railways and electric tramways took away custom by offering more direct routes into central London. With the onset of World War II, the West London Railway was badly hit in some parts by enemy action during the Blitz and the demise of the line was hastened by the wartime bombing. In 1940, London, Midland and Scottish Railway steam trains from Clapham Junction to Kensington ceased on 20 October and Willesden-Edgware Road electric services ceased on the same day. Other stations on the line such as St. Quintin Park and Wormwood Scrubs were more severely damaged than Chelsea & Fulham, and although the damage to Chelsea & Fulham was minimal, it never reopened. The station buildings remained intact after the war and were used by railway maintenance staff, although the footbridge and southbound platform building were removed. In the mid-1950s the main station building was demolished.

The derelict station is described in some detail by the author James Kelso in his reminiscences of wartime Fulham, in which he refers to the H-shaped building consisting of "two wings... joined in the middle by a set-back booking hall with a canopied forecourt", the enclosure of the disused premises in corrugated iron and barbed wire after the air raids, and the passage of troop trains hauled by 2-6-0 locomotives.

== The site today ==
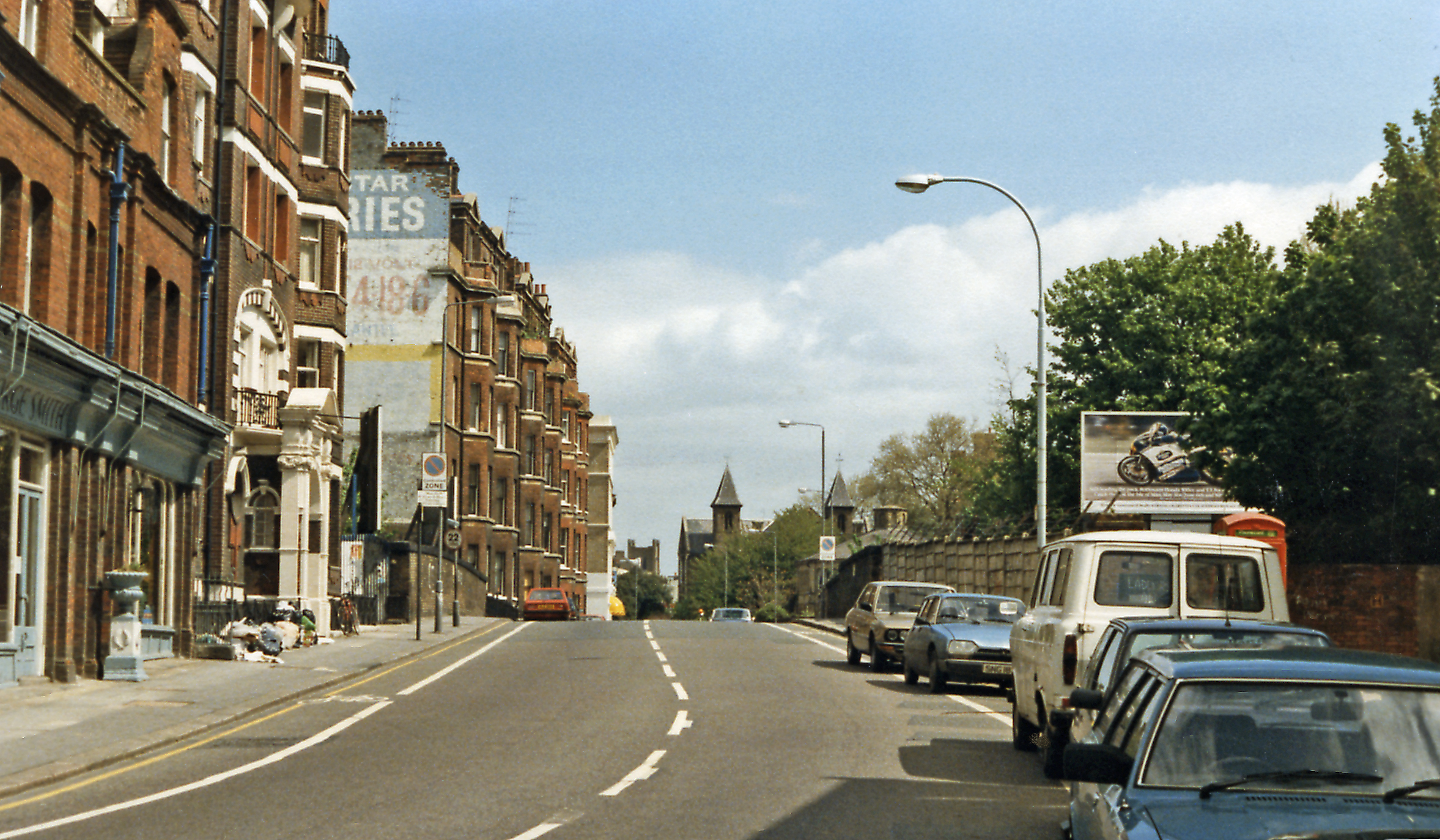
The station site on Fulham Road in 1986

Today the site of the former station is occupied by a block of flats. Parts of the northbound platform riser walls and some platform nosings remain.

The West London line continued in use mainly as a freight route until its reopening as a passenger line under British Rail. Since the revival of the line as part of the London Overground network, service frequencies on the line have increased, and although Chelsea & Fulham station was never re-opened, a new station called Imperial Wharf was opened in 2009 approximately 600 metres (2,000 ft) to the south, close to Chelsea Harbour.

Chelsea FC had proposed reopening the station to serve the stadium during match days but this was rejected on grounds that it would be too overcrowded on match days.

The local MP, Greg Hands, suggested reopening a station at the site in 2016.

Preceding station	Historical railways	Following station
Battersea	West London Railway	West Brompton
