= Primrose Hill railway station =

Former railway station in London, England

Coordinates: 51.543179°N 0.154672°W

Primrose Hill
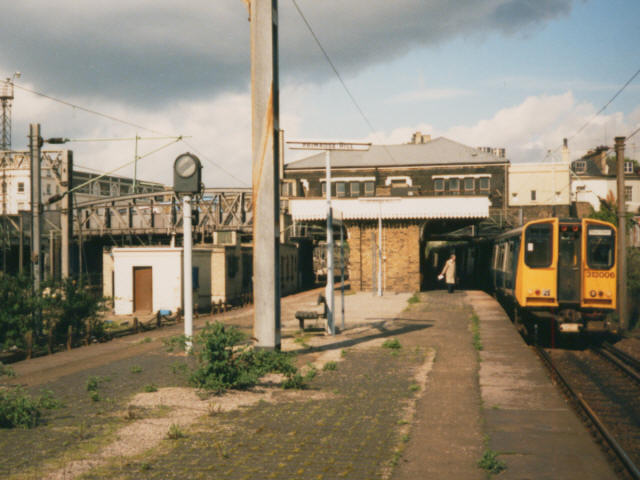
- Class 313 at the station in 1986
- Interactive map of Primrose Hill

General information
- Location: Primrose Hill
- Local authority: London Borough of Camden
- Grid reference: TQ279843
- Number of platforms: 2 (originally 4)

Railway companies
- Original company: London and North Western Railway
- Pre-grouping: London and North Western Railway
- Post-grouping: LMS

Key dates
- 1852: Opened (LNWR)
- 1855: Opened (NLR)
- 1915: Closed (LNWR)
- 1917: Closed (NLR)
- 1922: Re-opened (NLR)
- 1992: Closed
- 2008: Platform buildings demolished

Other information

Primrose Hill was a railway station in Chalk Farm, in the London Borough of Camden, opened by the North London Railway as Hampstead Road in 1855. It was named Chalk Farm from 1862 until 1950, when it was given its final name. From the 1860s to 1915, it was linked with a formerly separate station opened by the London and North Western Railway in 1852. The station closed in 1992, and the platform buildings and canopies were removed in 2008. The remaining building was partially destroyed by fire in January 2026.

== History ==
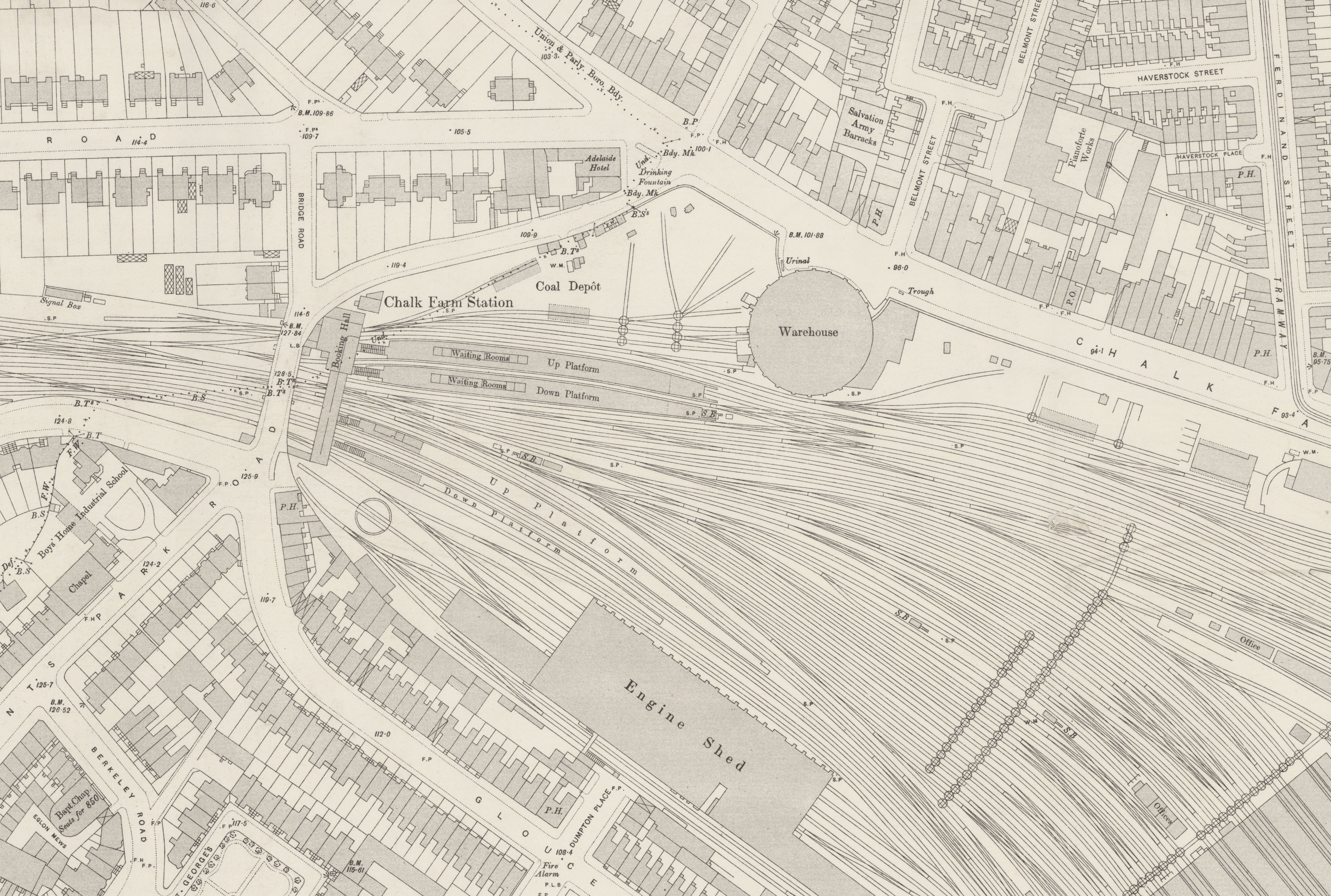
Chalk Farm station on an 1895 Ordnance Survey map

The London and North Western Railway (LNWR) opened its station as Camden on 1 May 1852. It replaced an earlier station of the same name to the south-east that had opened on 1 November 1851. The station was the first station out of Euston on the West Coast Main Line. In 1866, the LNWR's station's name was changed to Camden (Chalk Farm) and it was resited to the north-west on 1 April 1872 to provide a better connection to the NLR's station. In 1876, the name was changed to Chalk Farm to match the NLR's station.

The North London Railway (NLR) opened the station as Hampstead Road on 5 May 1855, replacing an earlier station of the same name to the east. (Note: The earlier station had been opened on 9 June 1851, by the East and West India Docks and Birmingham Junction Railway, which was renamed the North London Railway on 1 January 1853.) The station was renamed Chalk Farm on 1 December 1862, and resited to the west, with four new platforms completed on 24 May 1872. From the 1860s the two stations were linked with a footbridge across the tracks. The LNWR platforms closed on 10 May 1915. The NLR platforms closed on 1 January 1917 for wartime economy measures. On 10 July 1922 the NLR reopened two of its station platforms along with the LNWR's platforms.

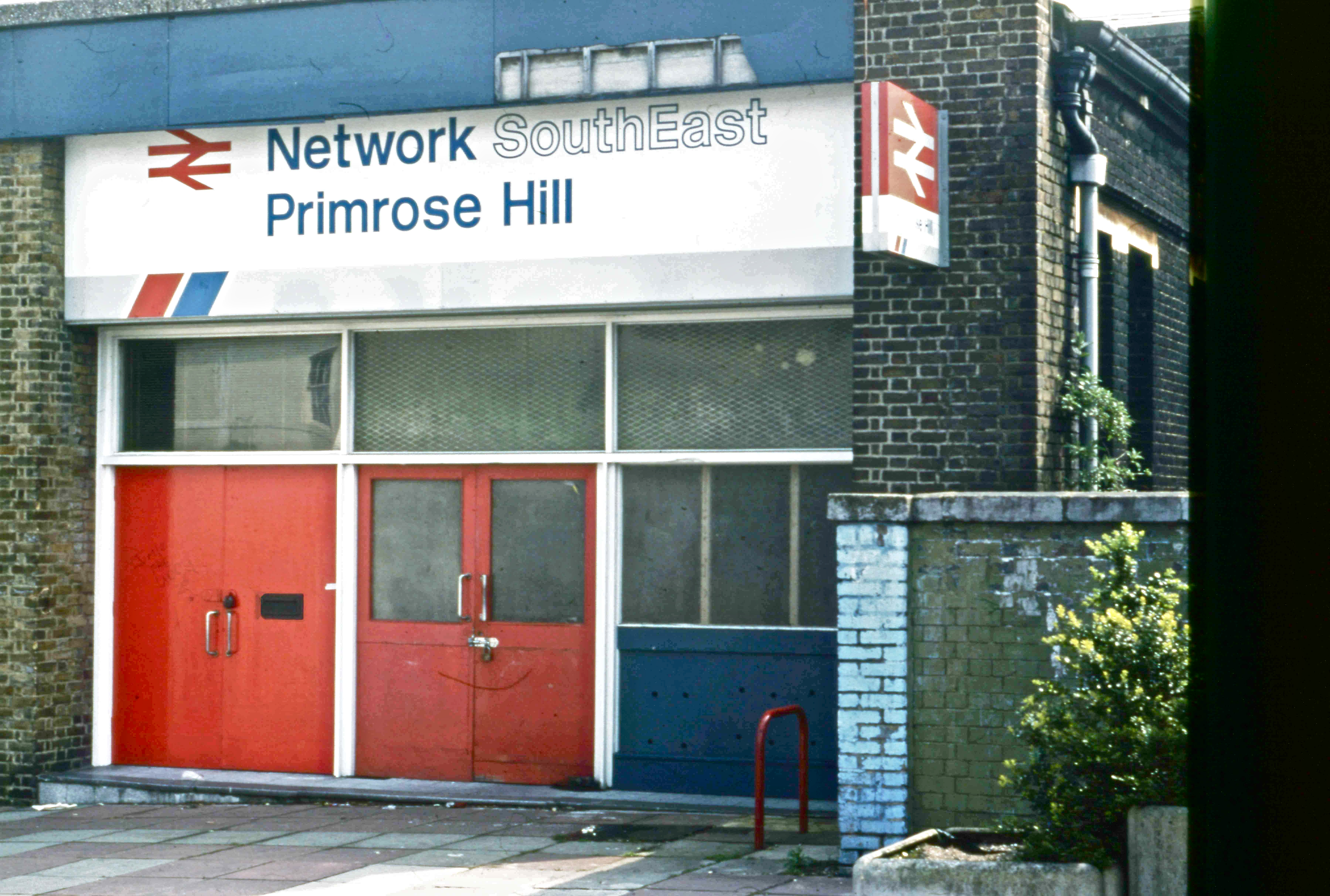
The station entrance in 1990

After the station's reopening in 1922, the passenger service was usually provided during peak hours only running between Broad Street and Watford Junction. After Broad Street closed in 1986 the service ran from Liverpool Street. The station was scheduled to close when the Liverpool Street to Watford Junction service was discontinued, but ended early due to flooding. The last eastbound train called at Primrose Hill on 18 September 1992 and the last westbound train called on 22 September 1992. The area is served by the nearby Chalk Farm station on the London Underground's Northern line.

On 25 September 1950, the station was renamed Primrose Hill.

The station building was closed in 1987 but remains and is occupied by a business. It is on Regent's Park Road at one end of the footbridge over the railway tracks. The platform canopies and the buildings supporting them were demolished by Network Rail in December 2008.

The nearby Primrose Hill Tunnels, East Portals, and the Western Entrance, have both been listed Grade II on the National Heritage List for England since 1974.

On the morning of 30 January 2026 at 09:30 am GMT, the former station building was engulfed in flames, which were put out later at 1:00 pm GMT.

== See also ==
- List of closed railway stations in London
- North London Railway
- Watford DC Line
- West Coast Main Line
- London Overground

== Notes and references ==
=== Sources ===
- Brown, Joe (2015) [2006]. London Railway Atlas (4th ed.). Ian Allan Publishing. ISBN 978-0-7110-3819-6.
- Butt, R. V. J. (October 1995). The Directory of Railway Stations: details every public and private passenger station, halt, platform and stopping place, past and present (1st ed.). Sparkford: Patrick Stephens Ltd. ISBN 978-1-85260-508-7. OCLC 60251199. OL 11956311M.

Preceding station	Disused railways	Following station
South Hampstead	Network SouthEast; Watford Jct–Liverpool St (peak hours only, 1986–1992)	Camden Road
South Hampstead	London North Western Railway (1852-1915)	Euston
