= Hendon Factory Platform railway station =

Coordinates: 51°35′43.31″N 0°14′15.94″W

Hendon Factory Platform

General information
- Location: Hendon, London Borough of Barnet; England
- Platforms: 1

Other information
- Status: Disused

Key dates
- 19 May 1918: Opened
- 1919: Closed
Location

Hendon Factory Platform was a short-lived railway station in Hendon which opened in 1918 before closing in 1919. The station was on a short spur line from the Midland Main Line and was operated by the Midland Railway.
