= Pimlico railway station =

Former railway station in London

Coordinates: 51.4823°N 0.1486°W

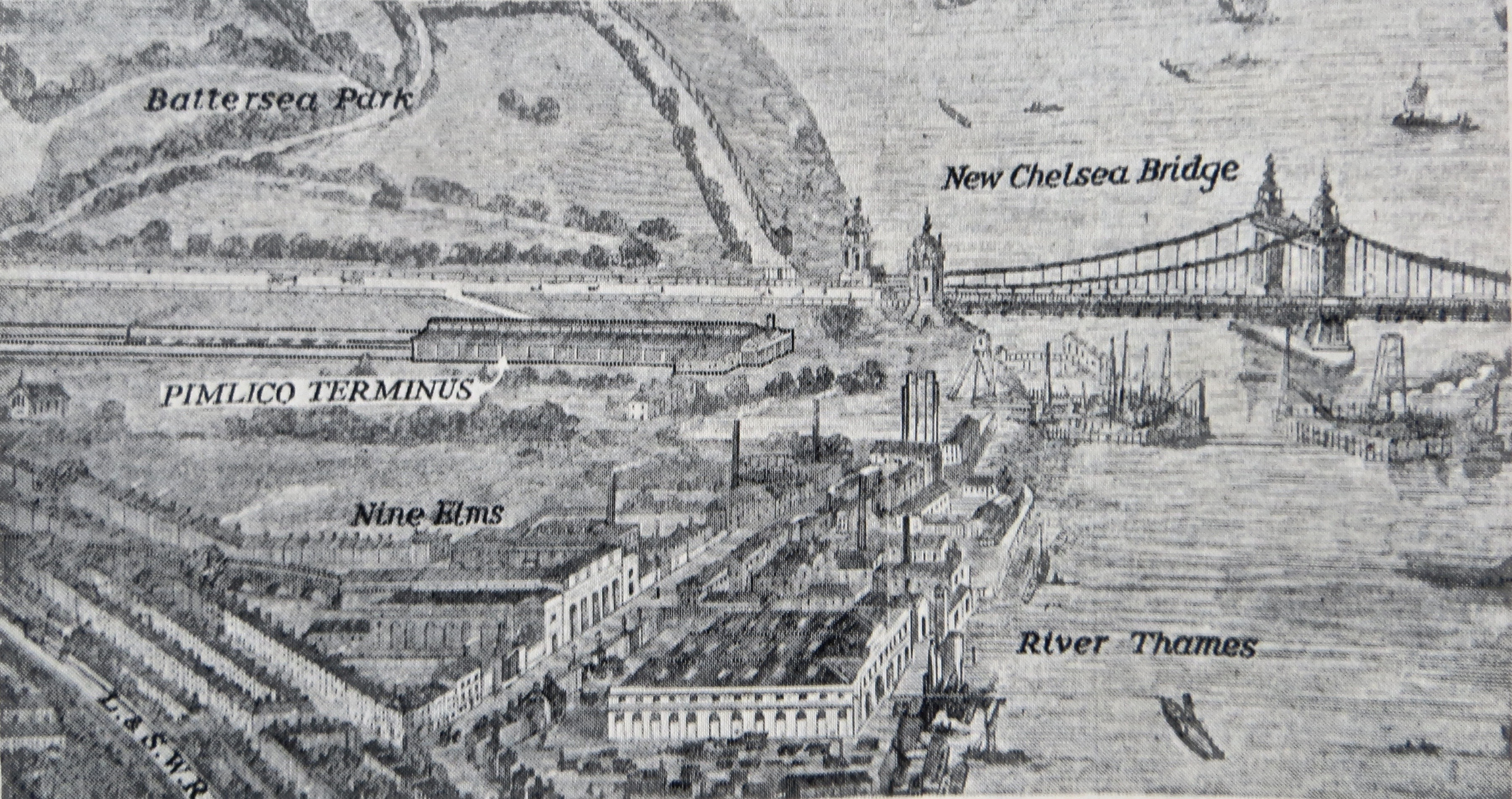
Part of panoramic view from The Illustrated London News 9 April 1859

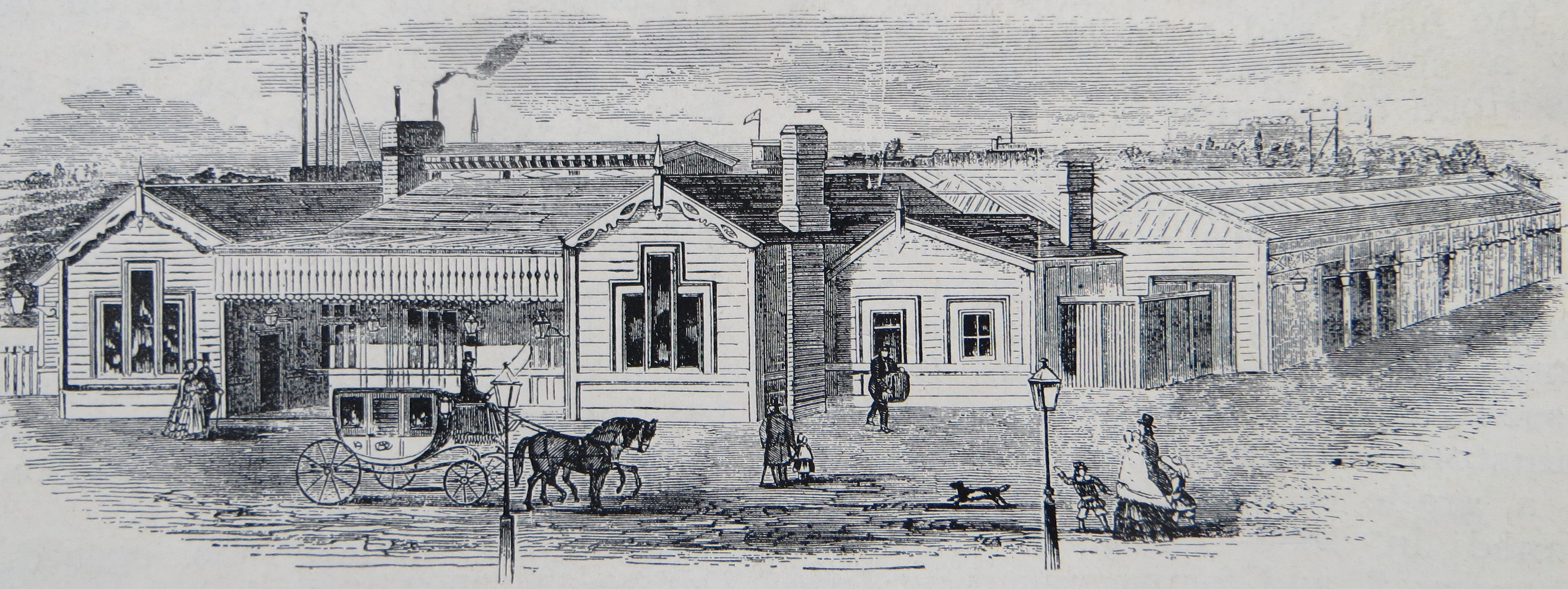
Pimlico terminus from a woodcut in The Illustrated News of the World 10 April 1858

Pimlico terminus was a railway station built beside the new Chelsea Bridge, across the road from the new Battersea Gardens. It was at the end of a 3 mi 20 ch (5.2 km) extension of the West End of London and Crystal Palace Railway from Wandsworth Common. Confusingly, the station was not actually in Pimlico, which is on the other (northern) bank of the river; to reach it, Pimlico residents had to cross Chelsea Bridge (at that time called Victoria Bridge) which opened a week after the station.

Its 22 acres (8.9 ha) site formally opened on Saturday 27 March 1858 and passengers used it from 29 March. Herapath's Journal said it, "was much admired for its spaciousness, convenient design, and economical construction".

There were nine trains a day to Brighton and 25 to London Bridge. Pimlico station closed on the eve of the opening of Battersea station and Victoria station on 1 October 1860. Apart from Maiden Lane, it was the shortest lived London terminal.
