= Battersea Park Road railway station =

Disused railway station in Battersea, London

Battersea Park Road
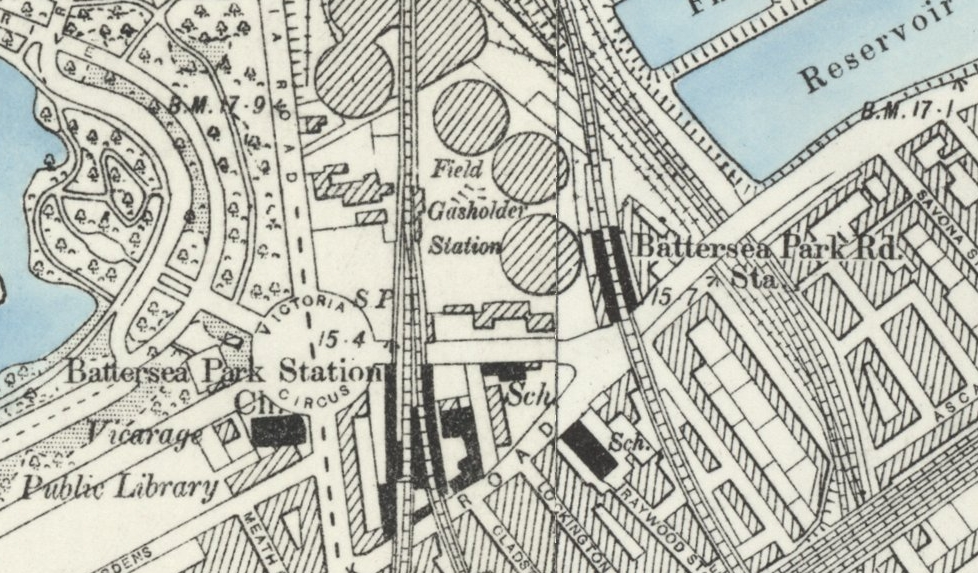
- Ordnance Survey map showing Battersea Park Road station

- Location of Battersea Park Road in Greater London
- Location: Battersea
- Local authority: London Borough of Wandsworth
- Grid reference: TQ288771

Railway companies
- Original company: London, Chatham and Dover Railway
- Pre-grouping: South Eastern and Chatham Railway

Key dates
- 1 May 1867: Opened as Battersea Park (York Road)
- 1 November 1877: Renamed Battersea Park Road
- 3 April 1916: Closed

Other information
- Coordinates: 51.47825°N 0.14521°W

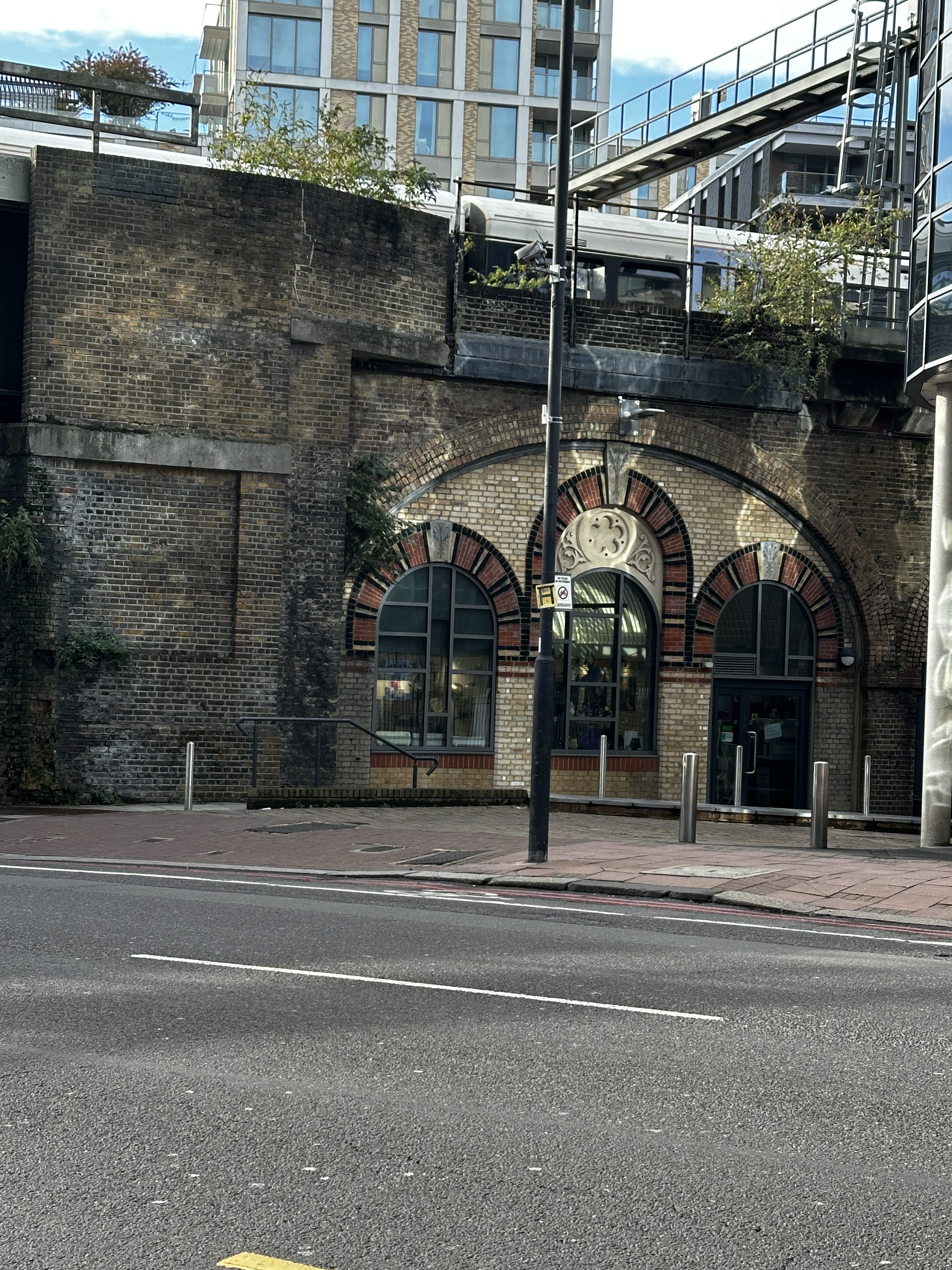
Decorative arch at the site of Battersea Park Road station

Battersea Park Road railway station in Battersea, South London was opened by the London, Chatham and Dover Railway in 1867. It closed in 1916 along with other inner-London stations on the Main Line. Battersea Park railway station, nearby on a different line from London Victoria, remains open. There is no evidence of the station at rail level, but the bricked-up entrance can be seen under the rail bridge close to Battersea Dogs & Cats Home.

== History ==
In 1879 the LCDR was running the following services that stopped at Battersea Park Road:

- Frequent trains between Moorgate and Victoria, calling at all stations (Note: Trains called at Moorgate Street, Aldersgate Street, Snow Hill, Ludgate Hill, Blackfriars, Borough Road, Elephant and Castle, Walworth Road, Camberwell, Loughborough Junction, Brixton and South Stockwell, Clapham and North Stockwell, Wandsworth Road, Battersea Park Road, Grosvenor Road and Victoria)
- Through trains from Kentish Town to Victoria, calling at all stations (Note: Trains called at Kentish Town, King's Cross (York Road), King's Cross (Metropolitan), Farringdon Street, Snow Hill then as for the Moorgate to Victoria service.)

Preceding station	Historical railways	Following station
Grosvenor Road; Line open, station closed	London, Chatham & Dover Railway; Main Line	Wandsworth Road; Line and station open
