= West End of London and Crystal Palace Railway =

Early railway line in South London

The West End of London and Crystal Palace Railway (WELCPR) was an early railway company in south London between Crystal Palace station and Wandsworth, which was opened in 1856. The line was extended in 1858 to Pimlico station at Battersea Wharf, near the bridge to Pimlico.

Throughout its brief existence the railway was operated by the London Brighton and South Coast Railway (LB&SCR) to which it was leased in 1858 and sold in 1859. This relatively short line was of considerable importance to the history of railways of south London as it was the first line to create a corridor from the south and east towards Westminster and led to the development of London Victoria railway station.

== History ==
=== Opening ===
West London and Crystal Palace Railway Act 1853
- Act of Parliament
- Parliament of the United Kingdom
- Long title: An Act for making a Railway to the Crystal Palace, with Branches to the London, Brighton, and South Coast Railway, and to the London and South-western Railway.
- Citation: 16 & 17 Vict. c. clxxx

Dates
- Royal assent: 4 August 1853

Text of statute as originally enacted

West London and Crystal Palace Railway Act 1856
- Act of Parliament
- Parliament of the United Kingdom
- Long title: An Act for authorizing Traffic Arrangements between the West End of London and Crystal Palace and the London Brighton, and South Coast Railway Companies, the Regulation and Increase of Capital, and for other Purposes.
- Citation: 19 & 20 Vict. c. lxxxvii

Dates
- Royal assent: 14 July 1856

Text of statute as originally enacted

West London and Crystal Palace Railway Act 1858
- Act of Parliament
- Parliament of the United Kingdom
- Long title: An Act for enabling the Battersea Park Commissioners to sell and the West End of London and Crystal Palace Railway Company to purchase Pieces of Land situate near the South End of the new Bridge leading from Chelsea to Battersea Park, for Lease of Undertaking to the London, Brighton, and South Coast Railway Company, for extending the Time for completing Extension to Farnborough; and for other Purposes.
- Citation: 21 & 22 Vict. c. civ

Dates
- Royal assent: 12 July 1858

To coincide with the reopening of the Crystal Palace at Sydenham Hill on 10 June 1854, the LB&SCR opened a short spur line linking a new Crystal Palace station to Sydenham station on the Brighton Main Line from London Bridge. The WELCPR was an independent company that aimed to create an additional line from Wandsworth to the LB&SCR station at Crystal Palace and thence to Norwood Junction, whence it would have running powers over the LB&SCR to East Croydon railway station. The line would also continue in an easterly direction towards Beckenham and Bromley. The intention was also to link the northern end of the railway to the London and South Western Railway at a point south east of Clapham Junction, whence trains would continue to Waterloo. The first part of the line, from New Wandsworth to Crystal Palace, opened 1 December 1856 and the extension to Norwood opened in 1857.

=== Stations ===
The original stations were:

- New Wandsworth
- Balham
- Streatham Hill - the 1856 wooden station booking hall remains unchanged
- West Norwood
- Gipsy Hill
- Crystal Palace Low Level.

The planned connection to the L&SWR never happened, and the railway continued parallel to the L&SWR line and then turned north to the misleadingly named Pimlico railway station, opened on 29 March 1858. This was at Battersea Wharf, on the south bank of the River Thames, and was connected to the actual district of Pimlico, on the north bank, by the recently completed Victoria Bridge (a road bridge, later renamed Chelsea Bridge).

=== Operation ===
From the beginning the railway was operated by the LB&SCR in return for 42.5% of the gross receipts, less an annual fee of £8,000 to allow the LB&SCR to run its own trains over the line. Soon afterwards this line was leased to the LB&SCR.

=== Farnborough Extension ===
West London and Crystal Palace Railway (Extension to Farnborough) Act 1854
- Act of Parliament
- Parliament of the United Kingdom
- Long title: An Act to enable the West End of London and Crystal Palace Railway Company to make a Railway from Norwood to Bromley and Farnborough, and for other Purposes.
- Citation: 17 & 18 Vict. c. ccx

Dates
- Royal assent: 31 July 1854

Text of statute as originally enacted

West London and Crystal Palace Railway (Extension of Time) Act 1859
- Act of Parliament
- Parliament of the United Kingdom
- Long title: An Act to extend the Powers of the West End of London and Crystal Palace Railway Company for the Purchase of Lands and Completion of their authorized Extension to Farnborough Railway, and for other Purposes.
- Citation: 22 & 23 Vict. c. xcviii

Dates
- Royal assent: 8 August 1859

West of London and Crystal Palace Railway (Transfer of Farnborough Extension and Dissolution of Company) Act 1860
- Act of Parliament
- Parliament of the United Kingdom
- Long title: An Act for the Transfer of the Farnborough Extension Railway to the London, Chatham, and Dover Railway Company, and for the Dissolution of the West End of London and Crystal Palace Railway Company; and for other Purposes.
- Citation: 23 & 24 Vict. c. clxxiv

Dates
- Royal assent: 23 July 1860

Text of statute as originally enacted

On 3 May 1858 the company opened the first stage of its projected Farnborough Extension to Shortlands railway station (then called Bromley) from Bromley Junction near Norwood Junction via Beckenham Junction station and a short-lived station at Penge (on the site of the present Beckenham Road tram stop). This line connected with the East Kent Railway, which then obtained running powers over the WEL&CPR, providing it with an entry into London. In 1860, the East Kent changed its name to become the London, Chatham and Dover Railway (LC&DR). Passenger services between Crystal Palace and Shortlands were provided by the WELCPR, with a locomotive and stock bought from the LB&SCR from May 1858 to December 1860 and thereafter by the LC&DR.

The original WELCPR line from Pimlico to Norwood Junction via Crystal Palace was sold to the LB&SCR in 1859 and from Bromley Junction to Shortlands to the LC&DR, but were operated by the WELCPR until the opening of the LCDR line to Beckenham in 1860. The remainder of the Farnborough Extension was never constructed.

In 1860 the former WELCPR line at Pimlico was connected to the Victoria Station and Pimlico Railway, giving both the LB&SCR and the LC&DR access to the new Victoria terminus. Until 1863 this short section of line was a part of both the Brighton Main Line and the Chatham Main Line to Dover.
