= Battersea Park railway station =

National Rail station in London, England

Battersea Park
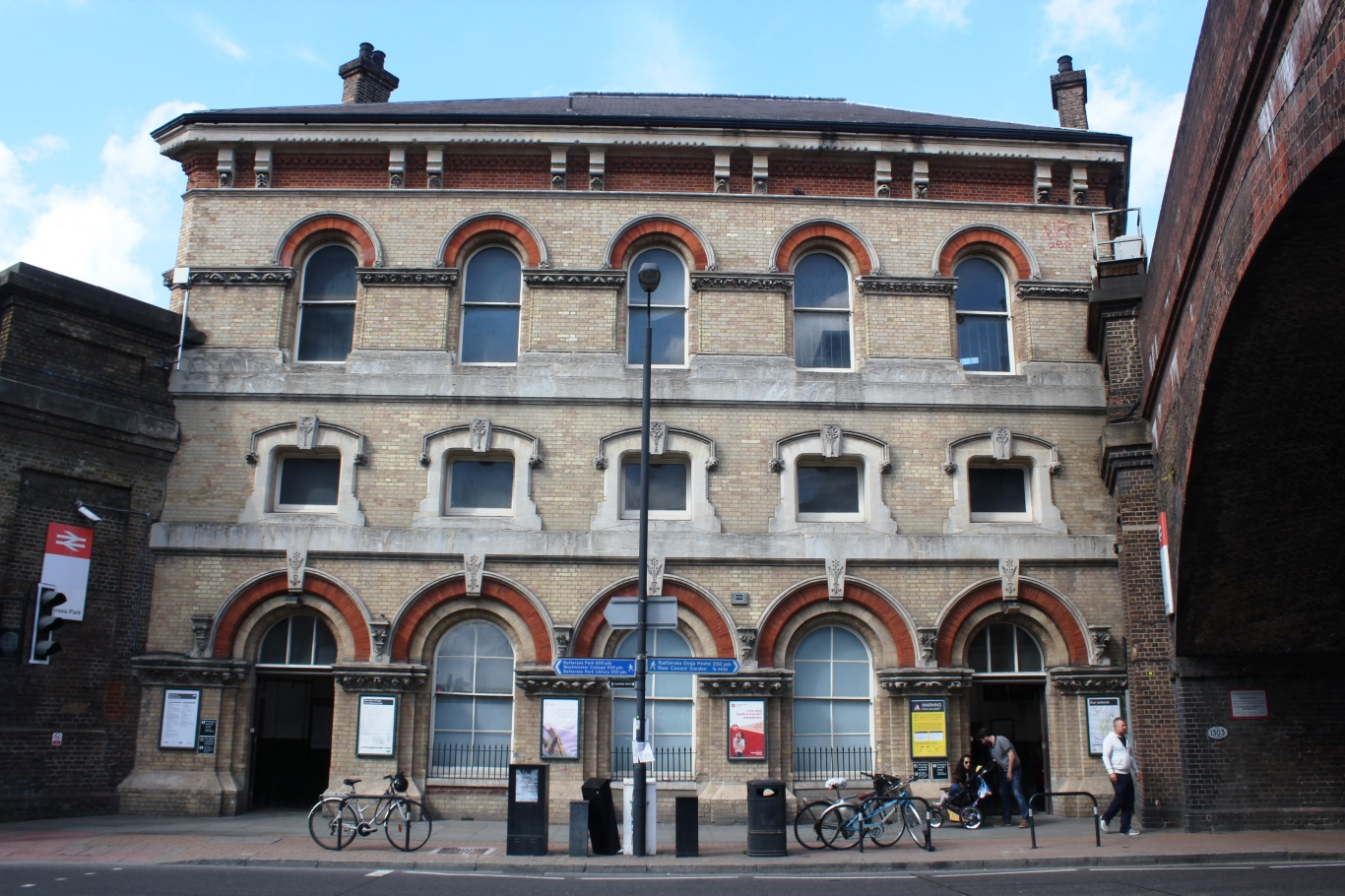
- Interactive map of Battersea Park

General information
- Location: Battersea
- Local authority: London Borough of Wandsworth
- Managed by: Southern
- Station code: BAK
- DfT category: D
- Number of platforms: 5 (4 in use)
- Fare zone: 2
- OSI: Queenstown Road; Battersea Power Station

National Rail annual entry and exit
- 2020–21: ▼0.741 million
- Interchange: ▼152
- 2021–22: ▲1.217 million
- Interchange: ▲331
- 2022–23: ▲1.374 million
- Interchange: ▲4,479
- 2023–24: ▲1.893 million
- Interchange: ▲4,995
- 2024–25: ▲2.184 million
- Interchange: ▼1,524

Railway companies
- Original company: London, Brighton and South Coast Railway

Key dates
- 1 May 1867: Opened

Other information
- External links: Departures; Facilities
- Coordinates: 51.4779°N 0.1477°W

Designations

Listed Building – Grade II
- Official name: Battersea Park Railway Station
- Designated: 7 April 1983
- Reference no.: 1357652

Battersea Park is a suburban railway station in the London Borough of Wandsworth, southwest London. It is at the junction of the South London line and the Brighton Main Line (although the physical connection between the lines has been removed), 1 mile 23 chains (2.1 km) measured from London Victoria. It is close to Battersea Park, and not far from Battersea Power Station.

The station has an out-of-station interchange with Battersea Power Station tube station on the newly opened Northern line extension to Battersea, part of the London Underground. It is also a short walking distance from Queenstown Road station. Additionally, Battersea Park receives a limited service on the Windrush line of the London Overground, with a small number of early morning and late evening services terminating here instead of at Clapham Junction.

== Description ==
The station has a polychrome brick Venetian Gothic facade. It is a Grade II listed building designed by Charles Henry Driver.

Access to the five platforms is via steep wooden staircases. Most services at the station call at Platforms 3 and 4, on the slow lines into Victoria. Platform 1 (the former down South London line platform) is made completely from wood and ceased to be used from December 2012, and the tracks have since been lifted. Platform 2 (the former up South London line platform) is used by the limited London Overground services that serve the station; it is now a terminal platform since the adjacent Platform 3 was extended over the former junction between the South London and main lines in 2014. Platform 5, on the down fast line from Victoria, is rarely used, usually during engineering works or congestion problems in London Victoria with services passing towards Clapham Junction. London Overground has a daily service to Dalston Junction.

The station is within short walking distance of Battersea Power Station Underground station, an extension of the Northern line to Battersea Power Station which opened in September 2021. The two stations serve as an out of station interchange.

== History ==
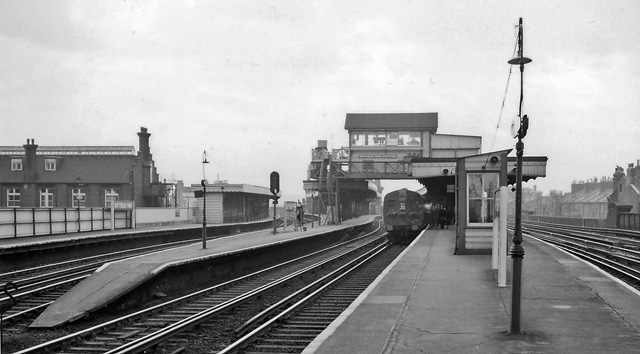
View from platform 4 in 1961

The first station to carry the name "Battersea Park" was opened by the London, Brighton and South Coast Railway (LB&SCR) as "Battersea" on 1 October 1860 and was located at the southern end of what is now Grosvenor Bridge. It was named "Battersea Park" on 1 July 1862 but was sometimes called "Battersea Park and Steamboat Pier". It closed on 1 November 1870 concurrently with the opening of Grosvenor Road station situated at the north end of Grosvenor Bridge. The LB&SCR opened a high-level line between Pouparts Junction and Battersea Pier Junction on 1 May 1867 as a means of reducing congestion at Stewarts Lane. York Road (Battersea) station opened at this time. The station was renamed Battersea Park and York Road 1 January 1877 and Battersea Park on 1 June 1885.

The South London line through the station to London Bridge was electrified on 1 December 1909 'Elevated Electric' overhead system. and to Crystal Palace on 12 May 1911, on the LB&SCR 'Elevated Electric' overhead system.

At the end of August 2009, electronic ticket gates were installed. There was some staffing provision but the station has been fully staffed from first to last train as part of the Southern franchise from September 2009.

With the redevelopment of Battersea Power Station into "The Power Station London", the station is due a complete refurbishment.

== Services ==
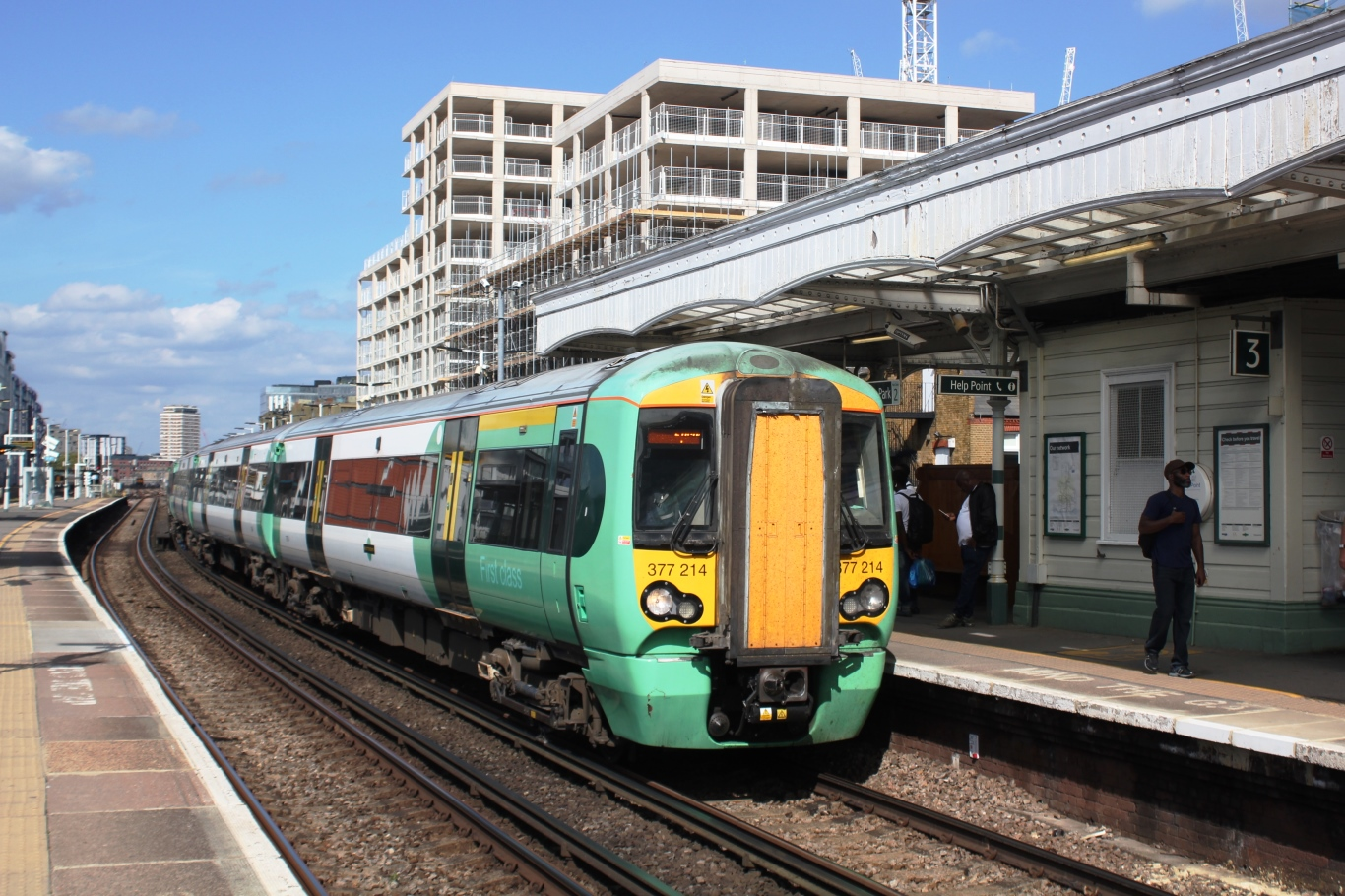
Southern Class 377 southbound at Battersea Park in 2018

Most services at Battersea Park are operated by Southern using Class 377 EMUs.

The typical off peak service in trains per hour is:

- 6 tph to London Victoria
- 2 tph to London Bridge via Forest Hill
- 2 tph to Epsom Downs via Norbury
- 2 tph to West Croydon via Crystal Palace

Additional services towards Sutton via Norbury call at the station twice per hour during the peak hours.

The station is also served by a very limited service on the Windrush line of the London Overground, consisting of two trains per day to and one train per day from Dalston Junction via Surrey Quays, operated using Class 378 EMUs. London Overground can also use Battersea Park if for whatever reason they are unable to serve Clapham Junction.

Preceding station	National Rail	Following station
London Victoria	Southern Brighton Main Line Stopping Services	Clapham Junction
Preceding station	London Overground	Following station
Terminus	Windrush line South London line (Limited service)	Wandsworth Road towards Dalston Junction

== Accidents ==
=== 1881 crash ===
On 24 December 1881, a train hauled by LBSC Terrier No.70 Poplar collided with the rear of the 11:35pm from London Bridge owing to a fogman's error.

=== 1937 crash ===
On 2 April 1937, two electric passenger trains collided just south of the station; ten people were killed and 17 seriously injured. The signalman at Battersea Park, believing there to be a fault with his equipment, overrode the electrical interlocking and allowed the second train into the occupied section.

=== 1985 crash ===
On 31 May 1985, 1D91 09:20 Gatwick Airport to Victoria Gatwick express formed of Class 489 GLV, Class 488 8301, 8203, 8313, Class 73 73117 collided with 2L51 08:51 East Grinstead to Victoria formed of DEMU Class 205 1113 and Class 207 1309 travelling along the up fast main line from Clapham Junction. Train 1D91 was following 2L51 along the Up Fast line, through Clapham Junction station, at which the latter train had made a scheduled stop and beyond towards Battersea Park. 1D91 had closed sufficiently on 2L51 that the former passed a series of signals displaying a 'single yellow' caution aspect, at which the driver cancelled the AWS warning and continued, as he was entitled to, at a speed of around 30 mph (48 km/h). Train 2L51 was then stopped for 1–2 minutes at signal VC552 displaying a red aspect. When that signal cleared, 2L51 was accelerating past it when it was struck from behind by 1D91 which had passed the protecting signal, VC564, at Danger.

A consensus of evidence suggests that at the moment of collision 2L51 had reached a speed of between 5 and 10 mph (8–16 km/h), whilst 1D91 was still travelling at between 25 and 30 mph (40–48 km/h), so that the net collision speed was about 20 mph (32 km/h). After the collision the trains separated and came to rest 20 m (66 ft) apart. There was no derailment but the shock of collision passing down each train caused damage throughout the length of both. Only one vehicle sustained severe structural damage; this was the leading passenger coach of 1D91, running immediately behind the GLV. This coach sustained a small degree of telescoping at underframe level, and hinging down of its trailing end, so that the saloon floor buckled upwards by about 600 mm (24 in) with consequent displacement of seats in one bay. One window each side was broken when this deformation occurred through the window opening, but the general integrity of the vehicles could be judged by the fact that these were the only external windows broken throughout the two trains.

The trains were conveying a large number of passengers, one estimate being as high as 800. In the collision 104 persons suffered injury and were taken to two hospitals by means of ten ambulances, the first of which arrived at 09:58. Most of the injured suffered only cuts and bruises and were discharged after treatment, but eighteen had serious injuries requiring detention in hospital for periods between one and fourteen nights. Twenty other passengers later reported having suffered injury. The uninjured passengers were conveyed forward to Victoria at 10:58 by a special train, the unobstructed Slow lines having been re-energised for electric trains at 10:45 after an initial complete isolation of the conductor rails in the area. During the day the damaged trains were made fit to move and hauled into sidings so that, there being no damage to the track or signalling equipment, normal working was resumed at 16:12.

== Motive power depots ==
The West End of London and Crystal Palace Railway opened an engine shed off what is now Prince of Wales Drive on 29 March 1858. It closed in 1877.

The London Brighton and South Coast Railway built a roundhouse a few yards north of the station on the lower level in 1869, extended with a second adjoining roundhouse in 1870 and a third in 1889. It closed 15 July 1934, but remained in use as a road transport depot until demolished in 1986.

== Connections ==
London Buses routes 44, 137, 156, 211, 344, 436, 452 and night routes N44 and N137 serve the station.
