= Grosvenor Bridge =

Railway bridge over the River Thames in London

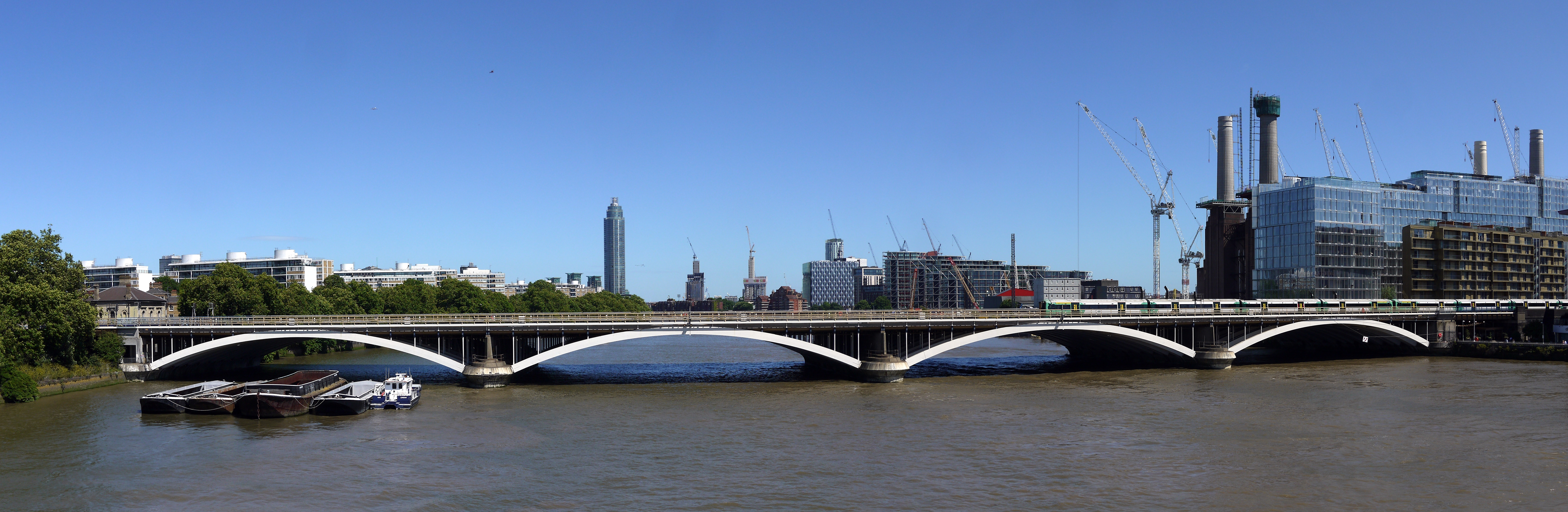
- Grosvenor Bridge with Vauxhall in the background and Battersea Power Station to the right
- Coordinates: 51°29′05″N 0°08′51″W
- Carries: Railway
- Crosses: River Thames
- Locale: London, England
- Named for: Sir Richard Grosvenor
- Maintained by: Network Rail
- Preceded by: Chelsea Bridge
- Followed by: Vauxhall Bridge

Characteristics
- Design: Arch bridge
- Total length: 283.5 m (930 ft 1 in)
- Width: 54 m (177 ft 2 in)
- Longest span: 53.3 m (174 ft 10 in)

History
- Opened: 1860; 166 years ago; rebuilt 1963–1967; 59 years ago

Location
- Interactive map of Grosvenor Bridge

Grosvenor Bridge, originally known as, and alternatively called Victoria Railway Bridge, is a railway bridge over the River Thames in London, between Vauxhall Bridge and Chelsea Bridge. Originally constructed in 1860, and widened in 1865 and 1907, the bridge was extensively rebuilt and widened again in the 1960s as an array of ten parallel bridges. There are now nine tracks across the bridge.

== History ==
The original bridge was constructed in the mid-nineteenth century in two stages: the first bridge was built by the Victoria Station and Pimlico Railway between 1859 and 1860 at a cost of £84,000 to carry two tracks into Victoria Station; it was the first railway bridge across the Thames in central London. The engineer was Sir John Fowler.

The bridge was widened by four tracks on the eastern side for the London, Brighton and South Coast Railway and London, Chatham and Dover Railway between 1865 and 1866, at a cost of £245,000. Sir Charles Fox was the engineer.

In 1907 the bridge was widened again with a further track, on the western side, for the London, Brighton and South Coast Railway.

In 1963–1967, the structure of the bridge was completely renewed and modernised, leaving only the cores of the original piers. At the same time, a tenth track was added in a space formerly used for gas mains. To minimise disruption to traffic, each track was renewed separately, and put back into service before the next one was closed. The designer for this work was Freeman Fox & Partners, and the project engineer was A. H. Cantrell, chief civil engineer of the Southern Region of British Rail. It was said to be the busiest railway bridge in the world with 1000 trains crossing per day in 1968.

== Location ==
On the north bank is Pimlico to the north and east and Chelsea to the west; the Lister Hospital and the Royal Chelsea Hospital lie immediately to the north west. On the south bank is Nine Elms to the east and Battersea to the west. Battersea Power Station is immediately to the south of the bridge, and Battersea Park to the south west.

== See also ==
- Crossings of the River Thames
- List of bridges in London
