= Clapham station =

Clapham station may refer to:

- In Yorkshire:
  - Clapham railway station
- In London:
  - Clapham Common railway station (station closed in 1863)
  - Clapham Common tube station
  - Clapham High Street railway station
  - Clapham Junction railway station
  - Clapham North tube station
  - Clapham South tube station
- In Australia:
  - Clapham railway station, Adelaide
