= Clapham Common (disambiguation) =

Clapham Common is a triangular area of grassland situated between Clapham, Battersea and Balham in south London, England.

Clapham Common may also refer to:

- Clapham Common (ward), Lambeth, London, England, United Kingdom
- Clapham Common tube station, a station on the London Underground's Northern Line
- Clapham Common railway station, a station on the London and South Western Railway open 1838–1863
- Clapham Common Club, amateur football club active 1864–1871
