= London Buses route 88 =

London bus route

88
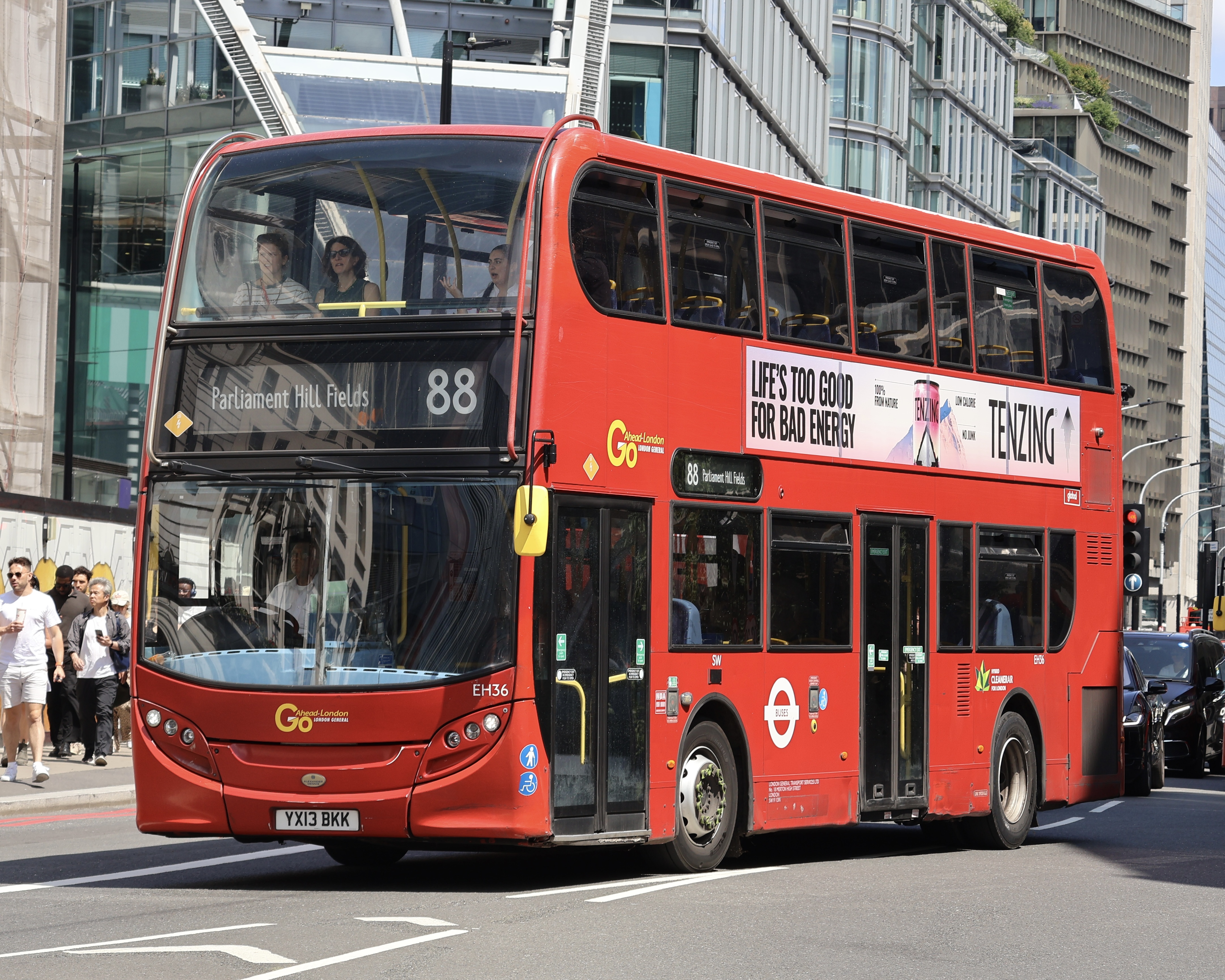
- London General Alexander Dennis Enviro400H in Victoria in June 2025

Overview
- Operator: London General (Go-Ahead London)
- Garage: Stockwell
- Vehicle: Alexander Dennis Enviro400H; Alexander Dennis Enviro400H MMC; Volvo B5LH Wright Gemini 3
- Night-time: 24-hour service

Route
- Start: Parliament Hill Fields
- Via: Kentish Town; Camden Town; Albany Street; Great Portland Street; Oxford Circus; Piccadilly Circus; Trafalgar Square; Parliament Square; Vauxhall; Stockwell
- End: Clapham Common

London Buses route 88 is a Transport for London contracted bus route in London, England. Running between Parliament Hill Fields and Clapham Common, it is operated by Go-Ahead London subsidiary London General.

== History ==
Route 88 was the first "Metropolitan" route to receive AEC NS-type buses, running between Acton Green and Mitcham.

In 1993, route 88 became the first in London to use kneeling buses, with air suspension that lowered at bus stops to give a significantly reduced ground clearance to make access easier. Between 1993 and 1997, a fleet of 12 m (39 ft) Northern Counties Paladin-bodied Volvo B10Bs, which featured branding that styled the service as "The Clapham Omnibus", were operated by London General on route 88. The Paladins were withdrawn in 1997 due to issues caused by their length and replaced with double-decker buses.

London General successfully retained route 88 with a new contract starting on 13 December 2003. Go-Ahead London successfully retained route 88 with a new contract starting on 11 December 2010.

New Routemasters were introduced on 22 August 2015.

On 30 March 2019, the route was extended from Camden Town to Parliament Hill Fields and re-routed between Camden Town and Great Portland Street Station to go via Albany Street and ultimately replace the C2, which ceased operation entirely.

== Current route ==
Route 88 operates via these primary locations:

- Parliament Hill Fields for Hampstead Heath
- Kentish Town Station
- Camden Town station
- Regent's Park Barracks
- Great Portland Street station
- Oxford Circus station
- Regent Street
- Piccadilly Circus station
- Trafalgar Square for Charing Cross station
- Whitehall
- Westminster station
- Tate Britain
- Vauxhall Bridge
- Vauxhall bus station for Vauxhall station
- Vauxhall Park
- Stockwell station
- Clapham North & Clapham High Street stations
- Clapham Common station
- Clapham Common Omnibus Clapham
