= Clapham tube station =

Clapham tube station could refer to one of a number of London Underground stations serving the Clapham area of south London:

- Clapham North
- Clapham Common
- Clapham South

National Rail station Clapham High Street is a short walk from Clapham North but is a separate station.
