= Clapham High Street =

Road and shopping street in London, England

Coordinates: 51°27′48″N 0°08′00″W

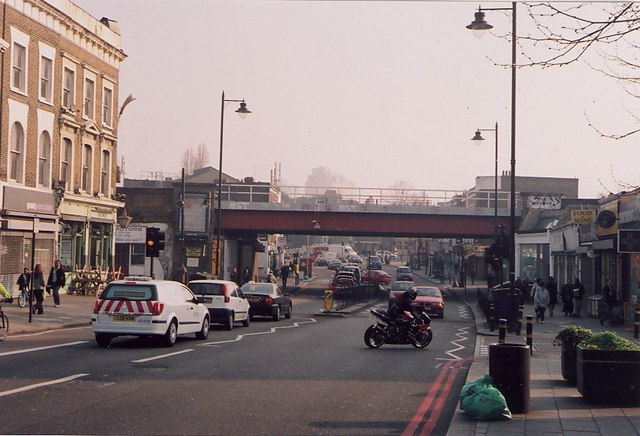
Clapham High Street.

Clapham High Street is the main through road and shopping area in Clapham, South London, England, in the London Borough of Lambeth.

== History ==
On Clapham Common, not far from the western end of the High Street, is Holy Trinity Church, which was associated with the Clapham Sect in the early nineteenth century. The Clapham Sect, whose members included William Wilberforce, helped campaign for the abolition of the slave trade and was instrumental in the introduction of the Slave Trade Act 1807.

== Transport ==
The High Street is well served by public transport: Clapham Common and Clapham North tube stations on the London Underground's Northern line are, respectively, at the southern and northern ends of the High Street, with Clapham High Street railway station on the South London Line, part of the London Overground with limited national rail services also serving the station, also at the northern end, close to Clapham North. London Bus routes 50, 88, 155, 322 and 345 run the length of the High Street, while routes 137, 417 and P5 serve the endpoints but do not run along the road itself.

The road itself is part of the A3.
