= Toilet Door Tits =

EP by Shit and Shine
- Released: 9 November 2006
- Genre: Noise rock
- Length: 30:27
- Label: Conspiracy

Shit and Shine chronology
Jealous of Shit and Shine (2006)	Toilet Door Tits (2006)	Cunts With Roses (2007)

Toilet Door Tits is an EP by Shit and Shine, released on 9 November 2006 by Conspiracy Records. The two extended tracks that comprise the album, "Toilet Door Tits" and "The Biggest Cock in Christendom", would later appear on the compilation Küss Mich, Meine Liebe in 2008.

== Track listing ==
All tracks are written by Shit and Shine.

Side one
No.	Title	Length
1.	"Toilet Door Tits"	14:40

Side two
No.	Title	Length
1.	"The Biggest Cock in Christendom"	15:47

== Personnel ==
Adapted from the Toilet Door Tits liner notes.

Shit and Shine

- Craig Clouse – vocals, instruments

== Release history ==
Region	Date	Label	Format	Catalog
Belgium	2006	Conspiracy	LP	core 041
