= You're Lucky to Have Friends Like Us =

Studio album by Shit and Shine
- Released: 1 April 2004
- Genre: Noise rock
- Length: 39:07
- Label: Riot Season

Shit and Shine chronology
You're Lucky to Have Friends Like Us (2004)	Ladybird (2005)

You're Lucky to Have Friends Like Us is the debut studio album of Shit and Shine, released on 1 April 2004 by Riot Season. It was released on CD for the first time when it was coupled with the band's third album, Jealous of Shit and Shine.

== Track listing ==
All music is composed by Shit and Shine

Side one
No.	Title	Length
1.	"The Trees Shall Mourn"	1:26
2.	"Don't Look at Me Don't Leave Me"	1:17
3.	"Recommencons"	2:23
4.	"Spider"	1:43
5.	"L'oubli"	2:34
6.	"Tavern Snacks"	1:43
7.	"Bridge of the Nose Nape of the Neck"	6:26

Side two
No.	Title	Length
1.	"I Could Make You Be a Woman"	3:51
2.	"Calling Them"	0:56
3.	"A to Z of Boy Singers"	3:04
4.	"Maybe I'm Right Maybe I'm Wrong"	1:07
5.	"Fishermans Jumper"	3:23
6.	"Witte Kat"	2:04
7.	"Nuns Leg"	1:39
8.	"Candles"	0:45
9.	"Liberty Wallpaper"	3:08
10.	"Life Like a Life"	1:38

== Personnel ==
Adapted from the You're Lucky to Have Friends Like Us liner notes.

Shit and Shine

- Craig Clouse – electric guitar, bass guitar, vocals, lawn mower
- Larry Mannigan – drums
- Frank Mckayhan – bass guitar, electric guitar, vocals, lawn mower

== Release history ==
Region	Date	Label	Format	Catalog
United Kingdom	2004	Riot Season	LP	REPOSELP04
