= Wandsworth railway station =

Wandsworth railway station can refer to any of the following:

- Wandsworth Town railway station, serves Wandsworth Town Centre and Southside shopping centre
- Wandsworth Common railway station, serves Wandsworth Common
- Wandsworth Road railway station, in Clapham
- New Wandsworth railway station, closed station in Clapham
