= London and Southampton Railway =

UK railway company (1838–1839)

The London and Southampton Railway was an early 4 ft 8 1/2 in (1,435 mm) standard gauge railway company between London and Southampton, in England. It opened in stages from 1838 to 1840 after a difficult construction period, but was commercially successful.

On preparing to serve Portsmouth, a rival port to Southampton, it changed its name to the London and South Western Railway in June 1839.

Its original termini, at Nine Elms in London and at Southampton Docks, proved inconvenient and the line was extended to better-situated main stations at both ends. The remainder of the original main line continues in use today, as an important part of the national rail network.

This article deals with the construction of the original line up to the time of opening throughout. Subsequent information is in the article London and South Western Railway.

== Beginnings ==
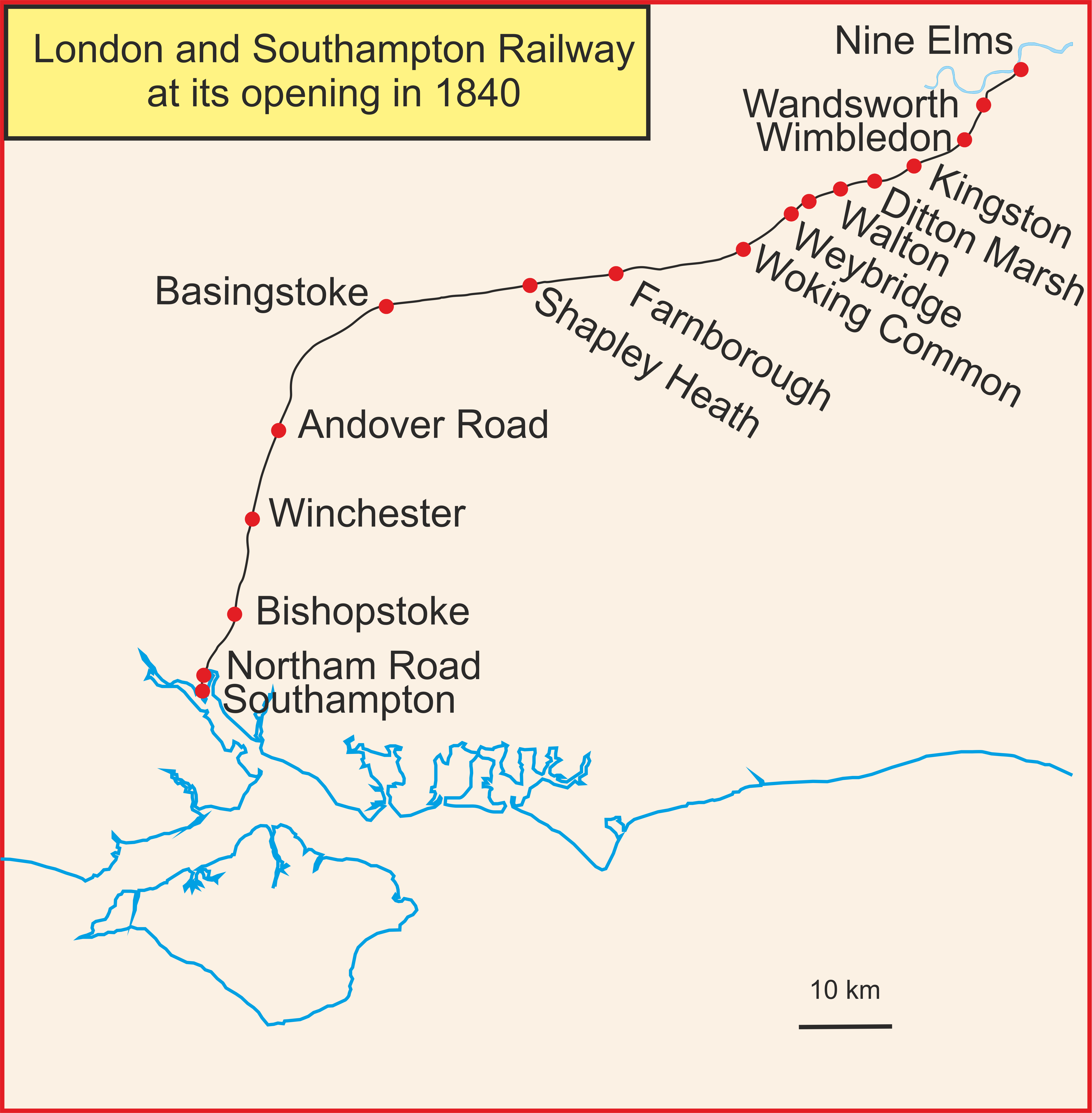
Diagram of the line when first opened

During the Napoleonic Wars, there had been concern about the safety of shipping traffic approaching London from the west (via the English Channel), and a number of canal schemes were put forward. At the same time, much of the packet traffic—urgent messages and small packages from and to foreign locations—used Falmouth as its port of entry and exit, and it was conveyed to and from London by road: a slow and inconvenient journey. An early proposal for a railway came from Robert Johnson and Abel Rous Dottin, member of parliament for Southampton. A prospectus was published on 23 October 1830 which gave support to the proposals.

A private meeting of interested parties was held on 26 February 1831, and a committee of investigation was appointed, and £400 voted for initial expenses, and the services of Francis Giles were secured as engineer.

A prospectus was issued on 6 April 1831 for the Southampton, London and Branch Railway and Dock Company, which was to have a capital of £1.5 million. The line was to link Southampton and London, and to extend a branch to districts between Hungerford and Bath and Bristol, and the company was to make improvements to the docks at Southampton. The engineer Francis Giles was retained to design the route. A reduction in the price of coal to persons living near the line was forecast, as well as passenger traffic and the import of produce and materials through Southampton docks.

Giles proceeded with a detailed survey, but the directors were persuaded to hold over submission of their enabling Bill until the 1833 session, possibly to observe how the London and Birmingham Railway bill fared in the 1832 session. Williams suggests that this delay enabled the London and Birmingham Railway to be the first (main line) railway out of London and that it made the implementation of the Great Western Railway easier also.

London and South Western Railway Act 1834
- Act of Parliament
- Parliament of the United Kingdom
- Long title: An Act for making a Railway from London to Southampton.
- Citation: 4 & 5 Will. 4. c. lxxxviii

Dates
- Royal assent: 25 July 1834

Text of statute as originally enacted

Giles re-surveyed in 1833, revising some income estimates, and the prospectus now proposed a capital of £1 million, the docks development having been made separate once again. The London and South Western Railway Act 1834 (4 & 5 Will. 4. c. lxxxviii) received royal assent on 25 July 1834. No track gauge was specified. (Note: Williams suggests that this made it easier for Brunel to introduce the broad gauge on the Great Western Railway.) At Nine Elms engines would not cross Nine Elms Lane, but horses would draw the wagons to the river wharf, which had a 30-yard (27-metre) frontage. The route was to pass near Battersea, Wandsworth, Wimbledon, Surbiton, Woking Common, Basing, Basingstoke and Winchester, to the shore at Southampton. The railway was now to be called the London and Southampton Railway.

== The Bristol branch defeated ==
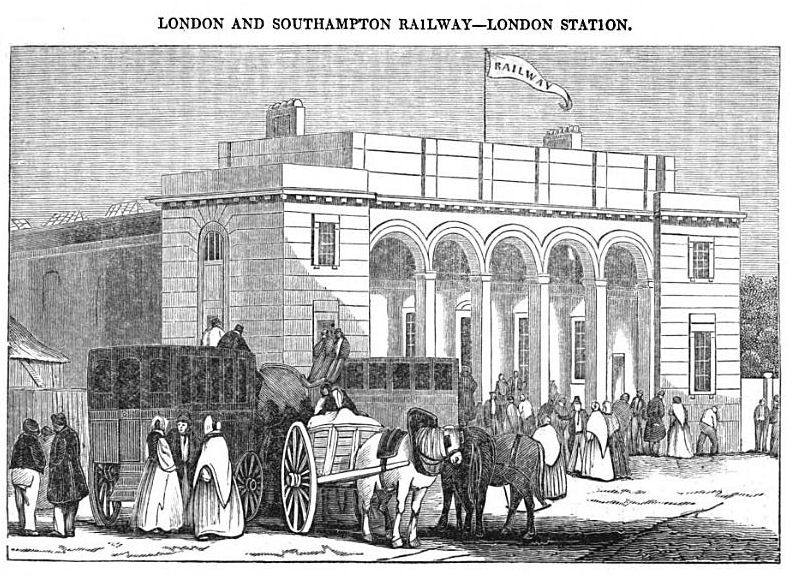
Nine Elms station in 1838

The route took a northerly curve through Basingstoke; this was to be the launching point for the branch to Bath and Bristol via Newbury and Devizes, for which authority was still to be sought. Considerable support had been generated for this line, even from the South of Ireland, and an act of Parliament giving authority was sought in the 1835 session.

However, the Great Western Railway (GWR) had also formed a proposal in the same session for its line between London and Bristol, and the two schemes were in direct opposition. Each side fiercely criticised the plans of the other side, and numerous expert witnesses were called. The committee stage lasted 46 days, but at the end Parliament found for the Great Western scheme, with royal assent being granted to the Great Western Railway Act 1835 (5 & 6 Will. 4. c. cvii) on 31 August 1835, and the London and Southampton Railway's branch to Bristol was no more.

Considerable fierce enmity was generated between the two companies during the parliamentary battle, and MacDermot, writing from the GWR point of view, says that "This was the beginning of a long and bitter hostility to their (the L&SR's) great neighbour."

== Construction ==
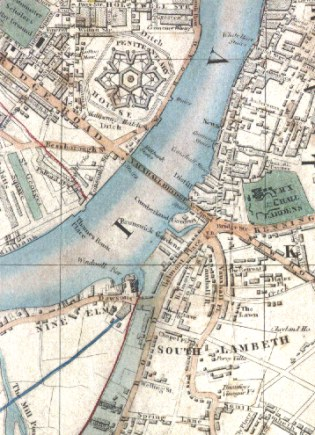
The Nine Elms area in an 1847 map

Construction started on 6 October 1834, with Francis Giles as engineer. His method was to employ a number of small contractors working concurrently, the railway company supplying the materials. Fay states that the contractors completed the easier parts of the work first and then demanded higher prices for the more difficult parts. Giles was subject to heavy criticism for the slow progress resulting from this cause, and for his serious underestimation of the cost of construction in general. He was effectively managing the host of small contractors—by now considered to be an unsatisfactory method of pursuing the works—but at the same time he was also acting as engineer for the Southampton Docks Bill and surveying a line from Bishopstoke to Portsmouth. Dissatisfaction with the rate of progress led to an inspection by a committee of the Lancashire shareholders. During the course of discussions, it became evident that not only were costs overrunning the original estimates, but that revised estimates, both of cost and of potential income, submitted by Giles were unreliable. The directors wished to raise an additional £500,000 but it was plain that the Lancashire shareholders would not agree to this while Giles remained in place. Giles was invited to resign, which he did effective on 13 January 1837.

The directors needed urgently to dispel doubt about the income of the company, and three men acquainted with the estimation of traffic were asked to submit forecasts. One of these was William James Chaplin, who had an extensive road coach business. His forecast was particularly favoured, so the directors appointed him on 26 April 1837. Chaplin's steady business acumen proved a great asset to the company, and he was appointed temporary deputy chairman for two weeks in 1840 after the resignation of Easthope until Garnett took over.

London and South Western Railway Deviations Act 1837
- Act of Parliament
- Parliament of the United Kingdom
- Long title: An Act to alter the Line of the London and Southampton Railway, and to amend the Act relating thereto.
- Citation: 7 Will. 4 & 1 Vict. c. lxxi

Dates
- Royal assent: 30 June 1837

Other legislation
- Amends: London and South Western Railway Act 1834

Text of statute as originally enacted

Joseph Locke was appointed as the engineer, but it was evident that substantially more capital was required to complete the line—Giles' original estimate had been £1 million including an allowance for contingencies, but the updated estimate to complete was £1.5 million. Parliamentary authority to increase the capital by what is nowadays known as a rights issue was obtained on 30 June 1837 in the London and South Western Railway Deviations Act 1837 (7 Will. 4 & 1 Vict. c. lxxi), not without unwelcome opposition from Giles. The act also authorised a number of local deviations to the route which reduced the earthworks necessary, and which replaced a proposed tunnel at Popham with a cutting on an eight-mile deviation from the original route. (Note: The Popham deviation was from near the present-day Worting Junction to south of Micheldever; the westward shift is obvious on a map; the Popham tunnel would have been over a mile long; short tunnels were still necessary on the altered route.)

Locke replaced the small contractors on the section from Wandsworth to the Wey Navigation, and brought in Thomas Brassey, who had successfully worked on the Liverpool and Manchester Railway and the Grand Junction Railway. On the more westerly sections he required the contractors to provide the materials themselves. Under Locke's superintendence, the work progressed more reliably and rapidly.

== Opening ==
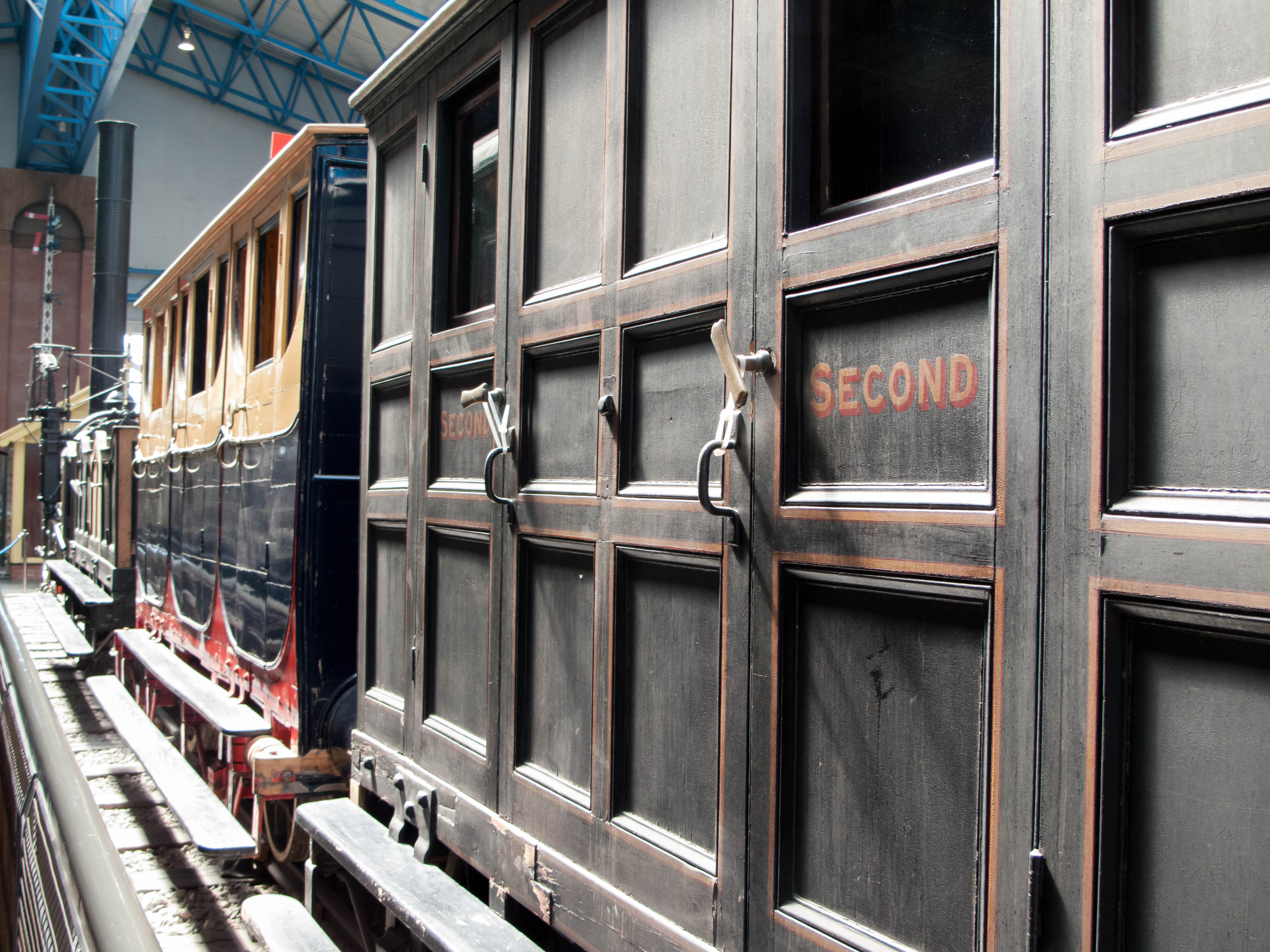
Bodmin & Wadebridge Railway carriages at York museum; Williams speculates (plate 13) that the further coach may be an original London and Southampton Railway vehicle, sold on to the B&WR

On 12 May 1838, a party of directors and others made an experimental trip from Nine Elms to Woking Common. That portion of the line was opened to passengers "without any special demonstration" on 21 May 1838, with five passenger trains running each way daily, and four on Sundays. Fares were 5s 0d first class and 3s 6d second class for the 23 miles. The 23 miles from Woking Common to nine Elms were covered in 57 minutes. Woking only had one platform at first.

Epsom races were held in the second week of operation, and the company advertised the intention of running eight trains to Kingston on Derby Day. That morning

a crowd of about 5,000 persons was found at the station gates. Several trains were despatched but still the throng increased, till at length the doors were carried off their hinges, and amid the shrieks of the female portion of their number, the mob broke over the booking counter, leaped through the windows, invaded the platform and rushed pell mell into a train chartered by a private party. Finding resistance useless, the officials sent for the Metropolitan Police, and at twelve o'clock a notice was posted on the booking office window announcing that no more trains would run that day.

By the end of the first twelve weeks, receipts had totalled £11,059 12s 3d for the carriage of 93,795 passengers; no goods had been carried at this stage. Working expenses were about 59% of receipts, considerably more than had been forecast.

On 24 September 1838, the line was opened as far as Shapley Heath (now Winchfield) "which had the effect of bringing the majority of the coaches running to the south west and west of England to that station". Then on 10 June 1839, the line was formally opened from Shapley Heath to Basingstoke and from Winchester to Northam Road, just short of the Southampton terminus. Road coaches plied over the gap between Basingstoke and Winchester, and the throughout journey occupied five hours.

At this stage the Archdeacon and Prebendary of Winchester wrote to the company complaining about the operation of trains on Sundays, contrary to Scripture. The chairman, John Easthope sent a forthright and carefully reasoned reply, bringing the issue swiftly to a close.

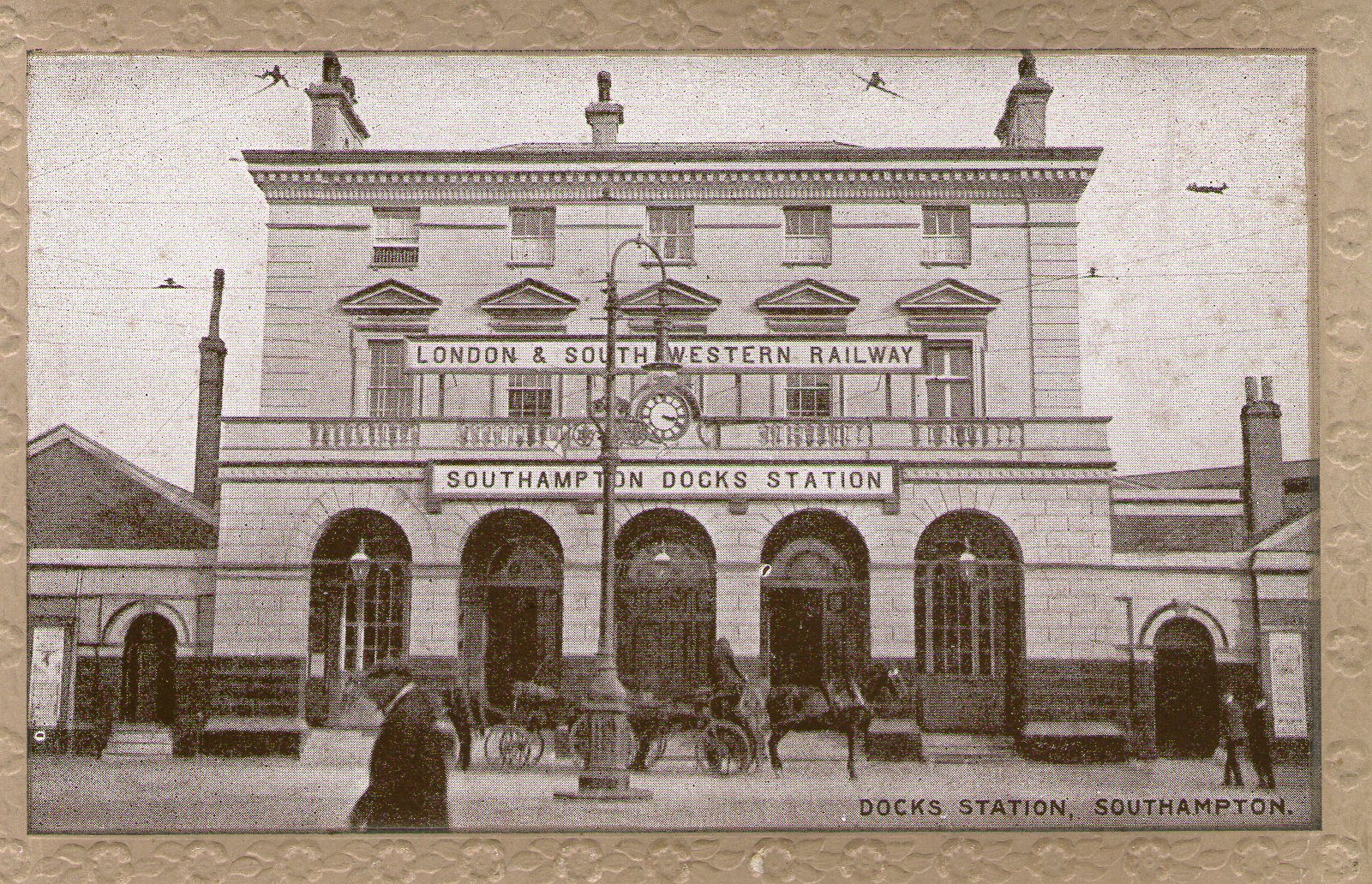
Southampton Terminus station

The final sections, the difficult (in engineering construction terms) section from Basingstoke to Winchester, and the short extension to the Southampton terminus, were opened on 11 May 1840. A train conveyed the directors from Nine Elms and arrived in Southampton three hours later, being received there by a salute of 21 guns.

Its construction had cost more than the original estimates; in January 1832, the declared estimates amounted to £1,033,414, but the financial reconstruction arising from the November 1836 revision used £1,507,753; the outturn was somewhat above this figure at £1,551,914:

Expenditure obtaining legal powers	£41,965 14s 0d
Land and compensation, law charges, valuing, surveying, etc.	£293,042 4s 1d
Premises at Nine Elms	£7,461 14s 6d
Construction of way and works	£1,176,556 12s 9d
Surveying and engineering	£32,887 6s 3d
Total	£1,551,913 11s 7d

== Expansion and name change ==
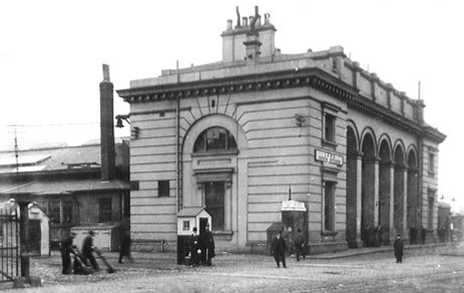
Nine Elms passenger station in an early photograph

In 1839, the year prior to opening, a proposed branch line to serve Portsmouth had failed in Parliament. Portsmouth interests asked the L&SR to promote a branch line to serve their city, and this was agreed to. As Portsmouth considered Southampton a rival port, the name of the London & Southampton Railway was objectionable, however, and to overcome this difficulty the L&SR determined to change its name to the London and South Western Railway. The bill for the branch line passed in Parliament as the London and South Western Railway (Portsmouth Branch Railway) Act 1839 (2 & 3 Vict. c. xxviii) and the name change was ratified under section 2 of the same act, taking effect on 4 June 1839. The branch was to run from Bishopstoke (later Eastleigh) to Gosport, giving a ferry connection to Portsmouth.

== Technical and operational matters at opening ==
=== Nine Elms Station ===
The fine building frontage designed by Tite included offices; Wishaw described the station:

The entrance to the booking-office is in the middle of this front, under an arcade which extends along the principal part of its length. On the left of the booking-office are separate waiting-rooms for ladies and gentlemen; and on the right a private office. The passenger-shed is immediately in the rear of the offices, and is approached by a door from the booking-office.

The passenger-shed extends from the offices for a length of 290 feet, and is altogether 74 feet 9 inches in width and 17 feet 3 inches high ... the top surface of each platform is 15 inches above the level of the rails. The queen-post wooden roof extends over the railway only ... the platforms are covered with flat roofs ... There are four lines of way under this shed ... near the end of the shed a transverse line, with four turn-tables at the point of intersection, runs across to the carriage-landing, which is on the right as you leave Nine Elms ... Without the shed a second cross line runs off to the carriage-house and locomotives' department. There are altogether beyond the shed eleven lines of way, including sidings.

The locomotives' engine-house is a rectangular building, lofty and convenient, and is furnished with four lines of way, some of which are provided with engine-races ... a triple way is extended from the Nine Elms station as far as the coke-ovens.

The locomotives used coke rather than coal; coke was considered to emit less smoke, and the company made its own coke at Nine Elms. Whishaw describes the plant in some detail.

Although the Thames-side location was convenient for wharfage, the location was never intended as a permanent London passenger terminal; an extension was contemplated in 1836 (and was decided upon in 1844). For the time being,

The London passenger found it more convenient than other companies' stations. He might leave it by road and frequently dip his hand for Turnpike tolls, or for 3d choose the steamer Citizen, or the opposing Bridegroom, to reach the capital by river, cursing his choice when the rival vessel arrived and cleared the other queue while his own waited half an hour. By 1848 about 1,250,000 used Nine Elms annually, including 300,000 from the [later] Richmond line, among whom lawyers and others daily suffered the rail and river trip between that town and Hungerford and Temple piers. Things improved slightly when the two steamer services combined shortly before the line opened to Waterloo. The London & Westminster Steam Boat Company took passengers along the Thames to and from Nine Elms and Dyers Hall Wharf, Upper Thames Street, and Hungerford Market.

=== Passengers ===
The practice of dealing with passengers was inherited from road coach and cart operation. Intending passengers were issued with a paper ticket filled in by hand. Carriages were not lit, and second class carriages were "sideless". Third class passengers were carried from the opening of the whole line, in open trucks attached to goods trains.

First class coaches had three compartments each; they were very low and narrow, "travellers' knees were pressed uncomfortably hard against those of their opposite neighbour". Second class was equally cramped, and the seat was a bare board; the second class carriages were open to the weather on either side.

Luggage was carried on the roof of first class carriages, and in boots underneath the seats, opening from the outside, in the case of second.

"A frame work with seats, fitted on the bed of a carriage truck, constituted the vehicle in which third class passengers travelled in those days; the frame work was removed upon the truck being required for its ordinary purpose."

=== Goods ===
When goods traffic commenced, the wagons were attached to the last passenger train of the day, but when the line was opened to Basingstoke a dedicated goods train was run. The guard travelled in a vehicle called a Noah's Ark, in which sundries and parcels were carried. The drawgear had no springing, and starting a heavy train was usually achieved by setting back on to a scotch, so as to slacken all the couplings, and then to start forward.

=== Operating ===
Up trains arriving at Nine Elms stopped before entering the station and the locomotive was detached; the train was then roped into the station. At this early date, a primitive form of time interval system was used: a train might not proceed until the preceding train was "well out of sight". The first accident was on 13 June 1840 when an engine ran into a train at Farnborough.

=== Locomotives ===
Locke, as engineer to the Company, was responsible for the locomotives. His experience on the Grand Junction Railway influenced his thinking; he used engines with a single driving wheel of 5 feet to 5 feet 6 in diameter, with outside cylinders 12 or 14 inches diameter and 18 inch stroke.

=== Permanent way ===
The gauge of the track was 4 ft 8 1/2 in (1,435 mm) standard gauge. The first rails ordered were of a flat-bottom wrought iron design, 3 1/2 in (89 mm) deep, and "of parallel form" as opposed to the fish-bellied pattern that had been popular previously. They were 15 feet (4.6 m) long. Kyanised half-round timber sleepers at 3 ft (0.91 m) spacing were used, with stone ballast from St Georges Hill, Weybridge. However it appears that some sleepers did not have preservative treatment, and their lives were accordingly short. The rails were to be in 15 lb (6.8 kg) chairs at the joints, but otherwise fastened direct to the sleepers.

By 1837, "63-lb [per yard] (31.3 kg/m) rails had replaced the 50-lb (24.8 kg/m) originals, in turn to be superseded by 75-lb (37.2 kg/m) rails before completion of the line." Fay says that "The line at its first opening was laid with stone block sleepers, but a few years' experience was sufficient to cause them to be replaced by wooden ones."

Thomas Brassey contracted to maintain the track for ten years from 1840, for £24,000 per annum.

== Factual summary ==
=== Opening of the line ===
- Nine Elms to Woking: 21 May 1838
- Woking to Shapley Heath: 24 September 1838
- Shapley Heath to Basingstoke: 10 June 1839
- Basingstoke to Winchester: 11 May 1840.
- Winchester to Northam Road: 10 June 1839
- Northam Road to Southampton: 11 May 1840

=== Stations ===
The stations on the line at the time of opening were:

- Nine Elms; the London terminus close to the south bank of the River Thames, on Nine Elms Lane a short distance west of the junction with Wandsworth Road; later closed on 11 July 1848 when the extension to Waterloo was opened
- Wandsworth; later renamed Clapham Common, on the northern margin of Wandsworth Common, about half a mile west of the present Clapham Junction which replaced it;
- Wimbledon; somewhat to the west of Wimbledon Hill Road and of the present station;
- Kingston; on the east side of King Charles Road, about half a mile east of the present Surbiton station;
- Ditton Marsh; now Esher;
- Walton; now Walton-on-Thames;
- Weybridge
- Woking Common; now Woking;
- Farnborough;
- Shapley Heath; now Winchfield;
- Basingstoke;
- Andover Road; now Micheldever;
- Winchester;
- Bishopstoke: now Eastleigh
- Northam Road station; at the road of the same name (closed 1840 on opening to Southampton);
- Southampton; later renamed Southampton Terminus.

The Nine Elms and Southampton station buildings were elegantly designed in the classical style by William Tite.

=== Tunnels ===
Tunnels on the line were at:

- Litchfield, 198 yards (181 m) long
- Popham no 1, 265 yards (242 m)
- Popham no 2, 199 yards (182 m)
- Wallers Ash, 501 yards (458 m)
