= 2026 Clapham unrest =

Unrest in London, England

Coordinates: 51.462541°N 0.136266°W

2026 Clapham Unrest
- Date: 28th and 31st March 2026
- Location: Clapham, London
- Caused by: Alleged causes include service cuts, lack of public spaces and social media trends

Casualties and arrests
- Injuries: 1 responder sent to hospital
- Arrested: 6

On the 28th and 31 March 2026, groups gathered and caused unrest on Clapham High Street and around Clapham Common in southwest London. The unrest resulted in six arrests, with five people assaulted, one responder having to be taken to hospital. A 48-hour dispersal order was also put in place.

== Unrest ==
The area of Clapham Common was a common meeting location for "link-ups" among teenagers. Such meetings had occasionally been the source of anti-social behaviour. The 28th of May saw the start of the Easter Holiday and invites to gather at the basketball courts in Clapham Common.

On the 28th, hundreds gathered in Clapham Common, with many moving through Clapham High Street. Shoplifting was prevalent and following assaults, three arrests were made. Similar scenes re-occurred on the 31st, and following three more arrests, a dispersal order was issued. In total, four police officers and one member of the public were assaulted.

== Response ==
The unrest was widely condemned, and seen by certain observers as a failure of police authority. The effect of shoplifting on shops in the area was significant. Marks & Spencer's chief executive and retail director described it as part of a larger perennial problem facing British retailers. Mayor of London Sadiq Khan would give a statement on the unrest: "The appalling scenes in Clapham in recent days are absolutely unacceptable and those responsible will face the full force of the law. Two arrests have been made and the Met is continuing to investigate".

=== Causes ===
The unrest was a cause of publicity and scrutiny, with many seeing the gatherings as symptoms of wider youth issues. A statement from the Metropolitan Police urged parents to take responsibility for the behaviour of their children. Other responses emphasised the lack of services available to young people. Sources also mentioned the role of social media in the organisation of such events and online trends in popularising them.
