= Powder Horn (album) =

Studio album by Shit and Shine
- Released: 19 August 2014
- Genre: Noise rock, electronic
- Length: 63:53
- Label: Diagonal

Shit and Shine chronology
Find Out What Happens When People Start Being Polite for a Fucking Change (2013)	Powder Horn (2014)	Tropical (2014)

Powder Horn is the eighth studio album by Shit and Shine, released on 19 August 2014 by Diagonal. The release saw Craig Clouse's continued exploration of the dance and electronic genre he had started with DIAG004. The Vinyl Factory placed the album at number eight on their "Top 100 Vinyl Releases of 2014" list and credited with being one of the best electronic releases of the year.

== Track listing ==
All tracks are written by Shit and Shine

No.	Title	Length
1.	"Hiss"	4:27
2.	"You Can't"	4:19
3.	"Pearl Drop"	5:30
4.	"PG 13"	6:04
5.	"Blowhannon"	5:35
6.	"Who's Your Waitress"	6:47
7.	"Value"	4:03
8.	"Astros Hat"	5:56
9.	"Acid Minor"	4:22
10.	"Bingo"	6:04
11.	"Shower Curtain"	5:17
12.	"Spray Bottle"	5:29

== Personnel ==
Adapted from the Powder Horn liner notes.

Shit and Shine

- Craig Clouse – vocals, instruments

Production and additional personnel

- Matt Colton – mastering
- Guy Featherstone – cover art

== Release history ==
Region	Date	Label	Format	Catalog
United Kingdom	2014	Diagonal	CD, LP	DIAG012
