= Chakin' =

Compilation album by Shit and Shine
- Released: 10 February 2015
- Genre: Post-bop
- Length: 54:35
- Label: Astral Spirits

Shit and Shine chronology
Tropical (2014)	Chakin' (2015)	54 Synth-Brass, 38 Metal Guitar, 65 Cathedral (2015)

Chakin' is a compilation album by Shit and Shine, released on 10 February 2015 by Astral Spirits. The album comprises improvised jazz sessions recorded for Clouse's Tuesday Jazz Chat on YouTube. The music is comparable to Sun Ra and Bitches Brew-era Miles Davis.

== Release and reception ==
The vinyl pressing was limited to four-hundred and seven copies, with five unique sleeve illustrations: Green background print, limited to one-hundred and forty-nine copies. Green/grey background print, limited to three copies. Green/yellow background print, limited to eight copies. Grey background print, limited to ninety-nine copies. Yellow background print, limited to one-hundred and forty-eight copies. It made seventh place on The Vinyl Factory's "The 10 Most Collectable Records of 2015" end of the year list, with the columnist saying, "the concept is charmingly shambolic, somewhat random and wonderfully egalitarian."

== Track listing ==
All tracks are written by Shit and Shine.

Side one
No.	Title	Length
1.	"Denim Do's and Don'ts"	16:34
2.	"TJC 16"	5:01
3.	"TJC 13"	5:26

Side two
No.	Title	Length
1.	"TJC 17"	6:51
2.	"TJC 7"	3:04
3.	"TJC 19"	5:20
4.	"Jump on the Feeder"	9:10
5.	"TJC 15"	3:08

== Personnel ==
Adapted from the Chakin' liner notes.

Musicians

- Craig Clouse – Wurlitzer electric piano, electronics, acoustic bass guitar, drums
- Nate Cross – Dual Rhodes, electronics, percussion
- King Coffey – drums
- Ingebrigt Håker Flaten – acoustic bass guitar
- Pete Simonelli – vocals

== Release history ==
Region	Date	Label	Format	Catalog
United States	2015	Astral Spirits	CS	AS009
Australia	2015	Rock Is Hell	LP	RIP64
