= Nine Elms railway station =

Former railway station in London, England

Coordinates: 51.4846°N 0.1278°W

Nine Elms
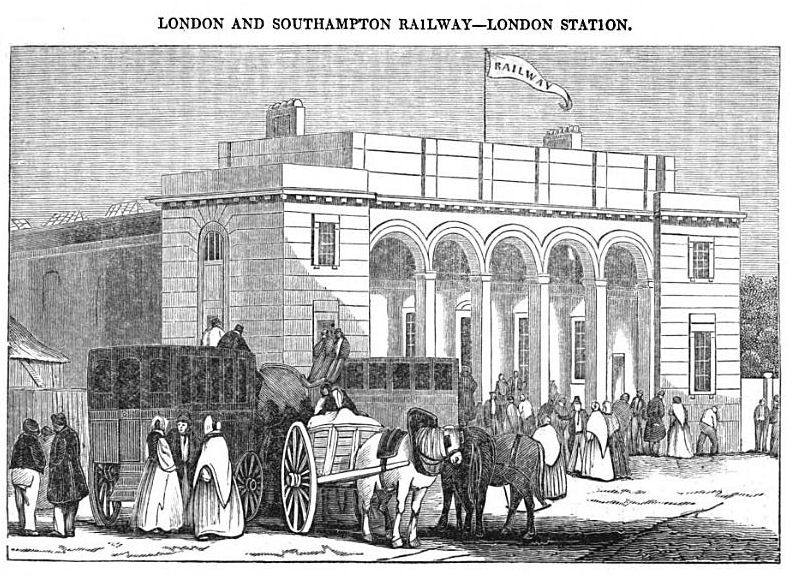
- The terminus in 1838

General information
- Location: London Borough of Wandsworth; GB
- Platforms: 2

Other information
- Status: Disused

History
- Opened: 21 May 1838
- Closed: 11 July 1848 (to passengers)
- Original company: London and Southampton Railway
- Pre-grouping: London and South Western Railway

Key dates
- 29 July 1968: Closed to freight
Location

Nine Elms railway station was located in Nine Elms and opened on 21 May 1838 as the London terminus of the London and Southampton Railway, which later became the London and South Western Railway. The building in the neoclassical style was designed by Sir William Tite. The station was inconveniently situated for travel to central London, with the necessity to complete the journey by road or by the steam boats connecting the station to points between Vauxhall and London Bridge.

The station was closed to passengers from 11 July 1848 when the L&SWR opened its metropolitan extension, the Nine Elms to Waterloo Viaduct from Nine Elms to Waterloo (then called Waterloo Bridge Station), and the area adjacent to the station housed the L&SWR's carriage and wagon works until their relocation to Eastleigh in 1909. After closure to passengers the station and surrounding tracks continued in use for goods traffic.

In 1941 the building was damaged by German bombs and it was demolished in the 1960s. The station closed as a freight depot on 29 July 1968. The site became the flower section of the New Covent Garden Market in 1974.

Preceding station	Historical railways	Following station
Clapham Common	London & South Western Railway (1838–1848)	Terminus

== Gallery ==
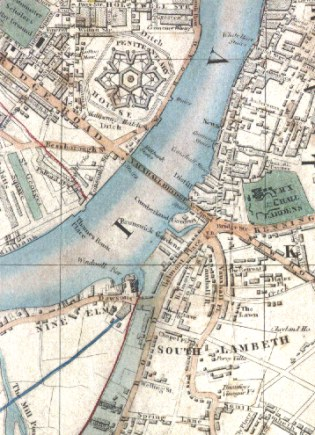
Detail from a map of 1847 showing the station

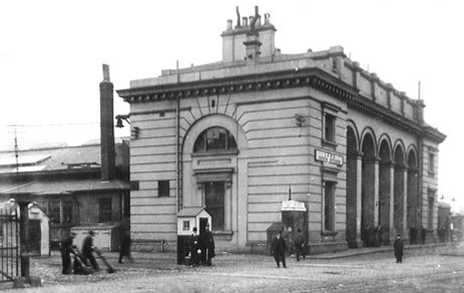
Nine Elms station, when in use as a goods station, adapted from an old photograph dated about 1905.
