= Jream Baby Jream =

Studio album by Shit and Shine
- Released: 10 April 2012
- Genre: Noise rock, experimental rock
- Length: 41:04
- Label: Riot Season

Shit and Shine chronology
Le Grand Larance Prix (2011)	Jream Baby Jream (2012)	DIAG004 (2013)

Jream Baby Jream is the seventh studio album by Shit and Shine, released on 10 April 2012 by Riot Season.

== Track listing ==
All tracks are written by Shit and Shine

Side one
No.	Title	Length
1.	"Dinner with My Girlfriend"	10:21
2.	"Mermuda Triangle"	4:41
3.	"Jream Baby Jream"	5:41

Side two
No.	Title	Length
1.	"Woodpecker"	3:18
2.	"Rodeo Girls"	10:05
3.	"Youth Led Worship"	6:58

== Personnel ==
Adapted from the Jream Baby Jream liner notes.

Shit and Shine

- Craig Clouse – vocals, instruments, cover art

Production and additional personnel

- Andrew Smith – design

== Release history ==
Region	Date	Label	Format	Catalog
United Kingdom	2012	Riot Season	LP	REPOSE 031
