= Find Out What Happens When People Start Being Polite for a Fucking Change =

EP by Shit and Shine
- Released: October 2013
- Genre: Noise rock, electronic
- Length: 25:10
- Label: Gangsigns

Shit and Shine chronology
DIAG004 (2013)	Find Out What Happens When People Start Being Polite for a Fucking Change (2013)	Powder Horn (2014)

Find Out What Happens When People Start Being Polite for a Fucking Change is an EP by Shit and Shine, released in October 2013 by Gangsigns. The cover art made number thirty out of thirty on Fact magazine's "The 30 Best Album Covers of 2013" list.

== Track listing ==
All tracks are written by Shit and Shine

Side one
No.	Title	Length
1.	"Panther Piss"	6:22
2.	"Stop Being Sexual"	5:35

Side two
No.	Title	Length
1.	"Darth Vader Flavor"	4:41
2.	"Corvette Museum"	4:15
3.	"Public Display of Pussy Whipped"	4:17

== Personnel ==
Adapted from the Find Out What Happens When People Start Being Polite for a Fucking Change liner notes.

Shit and Shine

- Craig Clouse – vocals, instruments

== Release history ==
Region	Date	Label	Format	Catalog
United Kingdom	2013	Gangsigns	LP	GS004
