= 229-2299 Girls Against Shit =

Studio album by Shit and Shine
- Released: 3 August 2009
- Genre: Noise rock, experimental rock
- Length: 79:20
- Label: Riot Season

Shit and Shine chronology
Küss Mich, Meine Liebe (2008)	229-2299 Girls Against Shit (2009)	Le Grand Larance Prix (2011)

229-2299 Girls Against Shit is the fifth studio album by Shit and Shine, released on 3 August 2009 by Riot Season. In writing for The Quietus, Toby Cook said "SAS expectorate wave after wave of uncomfortable, yet engrossing pandemonium" and "SAS have created something truly vital, and dare it be said a work of near genius."

== Track listing ==
All tracks are written by Shit and Shine

No.	Title	Length
1.	"Have You Really Thought About Your Presentation?"	9:14
2.	"Penthouse Is a MUST"	3:20
3.	"20 Years of Caring for the Nations Eyes"	4:14
4.	"USA/Mexico"	2:19
5.	"YES 9 10!"	3:18
6.	"The Cusp of Innocence, Prettily"	2:03
7.	"Girls Against Shit"	10:14
8.	"Shit No!"	2:40
9.	"Pissing on a Shed"	2:17
10.	"Roberts Church Problems"	11:24
11.	"I'm MAKING My LUNCH!!"	1:43
12.	"Kolchak the Night Stalker"	2:13
13.	"Hotel Denmark (You 3 Ass, Pussy, Blow)"	4:55
14.	"Friseur Nelson"	6:42
15.	"Kings Heath Shit & Shine Appreciation Society"	4:46
16.	"People Like You...REALLY!"	6:10
17.	"Goodbye and Good Gardening"	1:48

== Personnel ==
Adapted from the 229-2299 Girls Against Shit liner notes.

Shit and Shine

- Craig Clouse – vocals, instruments

Production and additional personnel

- Andrew Smith – cover art

== Release history ==
Region	Date	Label	Format	Catalog
United Kingdom	2009	Riot Season	CD, LP	REPOSE 022
