= Ladybird (Shit and Shine album) =

Studio album by Shit and Shine
- Released: 17 October 2005
- Studio: Southern Studios, London
- Genre: Noise rock, drone
- Length: 41:43
- Label: Latitudes

Shit and Shine chronology
You're Lucky to Have Friends Like Us (2004)	Ladybird (2005)	Jealous of Shit and Shine (2006)

Ladybird is the second studio album by Shit and Shine, released on 17 October 2005 by Latitudes. Featuring four drummers and two bassists, the album contains a lengthy forty-two-minute improvisation built on a repetitive drum pattern.

== Track listing ==
All music is composed by Shit and Shine

No.	Title	Length
1.	"Ladybird"	41:43

== Personnel ==
Adapted from the Ladybird liner notes. Shit and Shine

- Craig Clouse – vocals, instruments

Production and additional personnel

- Harvey Birrell – recording, mixing, mastering

== Release history ==
Region	Date	Label	Format	Catalog
United Kingdom	2005	Latitudes	CD, LP	GMT 0:01
