= Cherry (Shit and Shine album) =

Studio album by Shit and Shine
- Released: 28 January 2008
- Recorded: Southern, Dropout, Function 8 and Toddranch Studios
- Genre: Noise rock
- Length: 72:49
- Label: Riot Season

Shit and Shine chronology
Cunts With Roses (2007)	Cherry (2008)	Küss Mich, Meine Liebe (2008)

Professional ratings
Review scores
Source	Rating
Pitchfork Media	(7.2/10)

Cherry is the fourth studio album by Shit and Shine, released on 28 January 2008 by Riot Season.

== Track listing ==
All tracks are written by Shit and Shine.

No.	Title	Length
1.	"Creepy Ballerina"	1:06
2.	"Am I a Nice Guy?"	7:51
3.	"Honestly Don't"	1:46
4.	"Danielle"	1:37
5.	"Charm And Counter Charm"	5:15
6.	"If You Knew Susie"	1:07
7.	"Flower Petal Sword"	2:07
8.	"Prize Winning"	3:24
9.	"Charlade"	2:02
10.	"Cigarette Sequence"	5:17
11.	"Cherry"	4:58
12.	"Shockwave"	1:12
13.	"High Brooms"	14:43
14.	"The Rabbit Song"	20:24

== Personnel ==
Adapted from the Cherry liner notes.

Shit and Shine

- Craig Clouse – vocals, instruments, recording, cover art

Production and additional personnel

- Mathieu Berthet – mastering
- Harvey Birrell – recording
- Cake – recording
- Gadget – recording

== Release history ==
Region	Date	Label	Format	Catalog
United Kingdom	2008	Riot Season	CD, LP	REPOSE 017
