= Cunts With Roses =

EP by Shit and Shine
- Released: 7 June 2007
- Recorded: 29 August 2006 in South London
- Genre: Noise rock
- Length: 30:27
- Label: Noisestar

Shit and Shine chronology
Toilet Door Tits (2006)	Cunts With Roses (2007)	Cherry (2008)

Cunts With Roses is an EP by Shit and Shine, released on 7 June 2007 by Noisestar Music.

== Track listing ==
All music is composed by Shit and Shine.

Side one
No.	Title	Length
1.	"[untitled]"	13:37

Side two
No.	Title	Length
1.	"[untitled]"	15:20

== Personnel ==
Adapted from the Cunts With Roses liner notes.

Shit and Shine

- Craig Clouse – vocals, instruments

== Release history ==
Region	Date	Label	Format	Catalog
United Kingdom	2007	Noisestar	CD, LP	N#>008
