= London deep-level shelters =

Air-raid shelters under London Underground stations

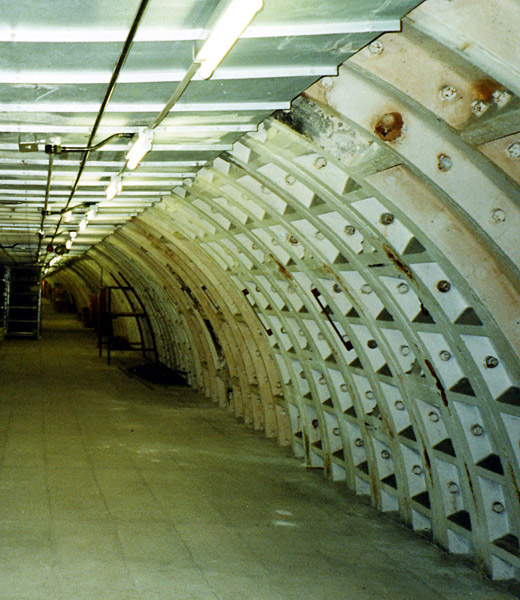
An upper level of one of the Belsize Park tunnels.

The London deep-level shelters are eight deep-level air-raid shelters that were built under London Underground stations during World War II.

== Background ==
Each shelter consists of a pair of parallel tunnels 16 feet 6 inches (5.03 m) in diameter and 1,200 feet (370 m) long. Each tunnel is subdivided into two decks, and each shelter was designed to hold up to 8,000 people. It was planned that after the war the shelters would be used as part of new express tube lines paralleling parts of the existing Northern and Central lines. Existing tube lines typically had 12-foot-2.5-inch (3.72 m) diameter running tunnels and about 21 feet (6.4 m) at stations; thus the shelter tunnels would not have been suitable as platform tunnels and were constructed at stations the new lines would have bypassed. However, they would have been suitable as running tunnels for main-line size trains. (One existing tube, the Northern City Line opened in 1904, used a similar size of tunnel for this reason, although in fact main-line trains did not use it until 1976.)

Ten shelters were originally planned, holding 100,000 people — 10,000 in each shelter. However, the final capacity was around 8,000 people in each shelter, and only eight were completed: at Chancery Lane station on the Central line and Belsize Park, Camden Town, Goodge Street, Stockwell, Clapham North, Clapham Common, and Clapham South on the Northern line. The other two were to be at St Paul's station on the Central line, which was not built because of concerns about the stability of the buildings above, and at Oval station on the Northern line, not built because of difficult ground conditions encountered as the work started. The working shaft for the shelter at Oval now functions as a ventilation shaft for the station.

The shelters were started in 1940 during the Blitz in response to public demand to shelter in the London Underground stations. However, they were not completed until 1942 after the Blitz was over, so they were initially all used by the government, but as bombing intensified five of them were opened to the public in 1944: Stockwell, Clapham North, Camden Town, Belsize Park and Clapham South. The Goodge Street shelter was used by General Eisenhower, and the Chancery Lane shelter was used as a communications centre.

== Post-war use ==
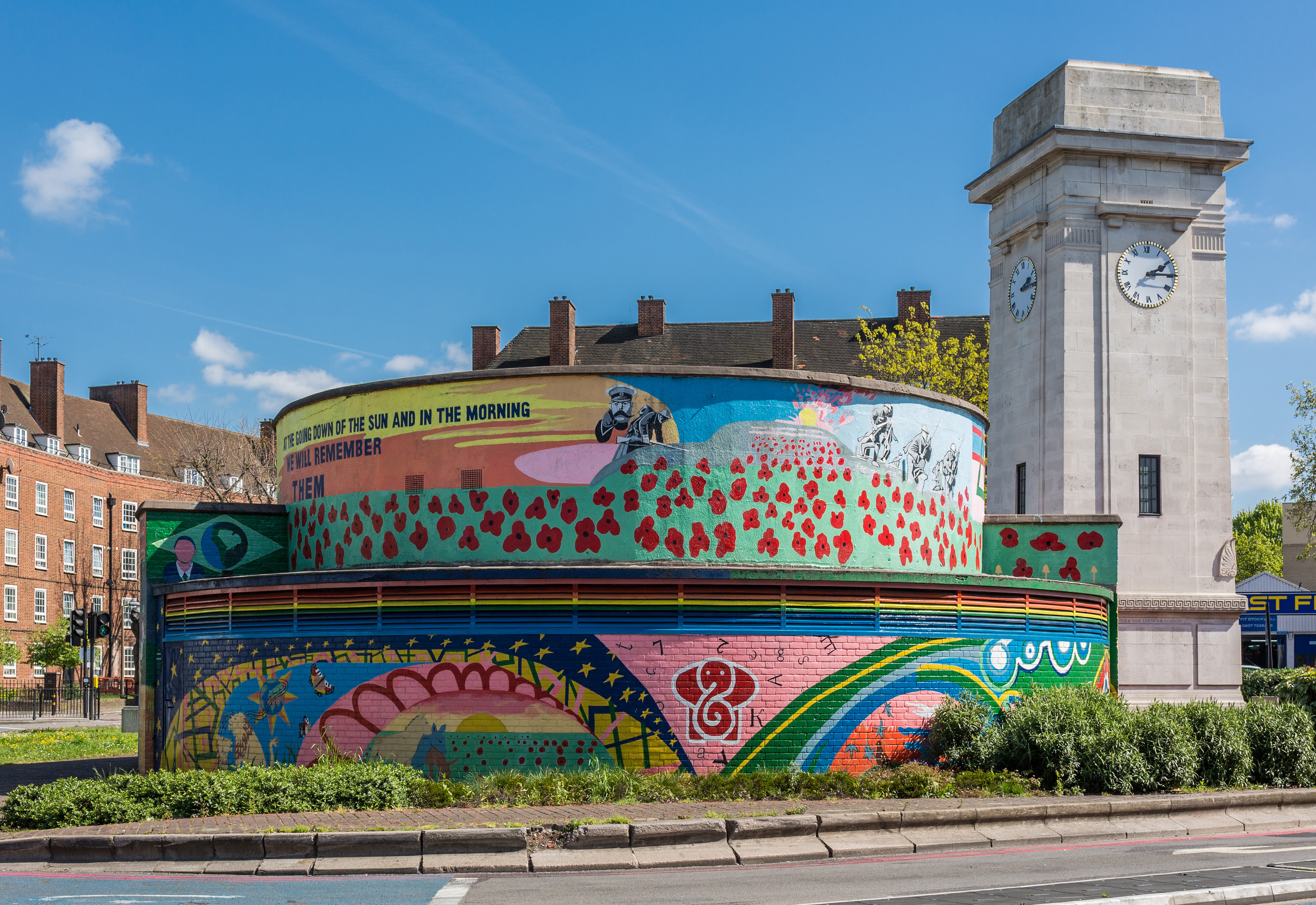
One of the entrances to the Stockwell shelter now decorated as a war memorial

After the war, the Goodge Street shelter continued to be used by the army until a fire on the night of 21 May 1956, after which the government decided the shelters were not suitable for use by large numbers of the public or military. The Chancery Lane shelter was converted into Kingsway telephone exchange.

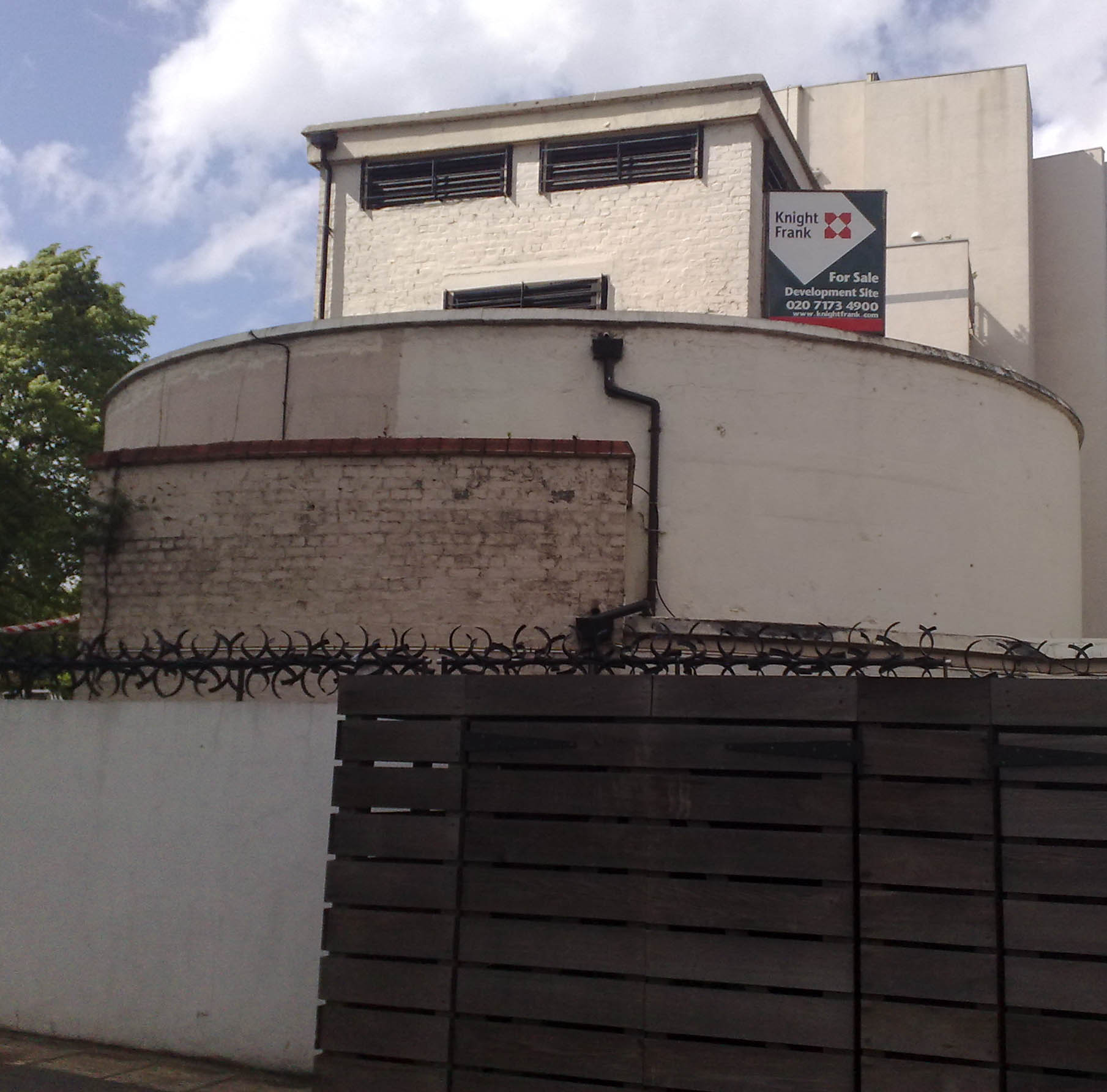
One of the entrances to Clapham South in 2009. It has since been incorporated into a new residential development.

In 1948 the Clapham South shelter was used to house 200 of the first immigrants from the West Indies who had arrived on the HMT Empire Windrush for four weeks until they found their own accommodation. In 1951, it became the Festival Hotel providing cheap stay for visitors to the Festival of Britain, but was closed after the aforementioned fire in the Goodge Street shelter. The shelter was used for archival storage for some years, but is now a Grade II listed building with pre-booked tours arranged by the London Transport Museum via its "Hidden London" programme.

All the shelters, with the exception of Chancery Lane, were sold by the government to Transport for London in 1998. The Clapham Common shelter was leased in 2014 by the Zero Carbon Food company, who use the shelter as a hydroponic farm.

== In popular culture ==
The Goodge Street shelter appeared in studio mock-up form in the 1968 BBC Doctor Who story The Web of Fear. The surface entrance to the Goodge Street shelter appears as itself in the 1988 feature film Hidden City, written and directed by Stephen Poliakoff, although interiors were actually shot at Clapham South.

The Camden Town shelter was used to represent parts of Oval tube station in the 1976 two-part story The Lights of London in the BBC television series Survivors. The director of the second episode was Pennant Roberts, who subsequently directed the 1977 Doctor Who story The Sun Makers, in which the same shelter was used for scenes set in tunnels under Pluto. Roberts subsequently worked on the BBC series Blake's 7, in which the shelter was used for the interior of the titular artificial planet in the 1980 story Ultraworld, although the episode itself was directed by Vere Lorrimer. The shelter was also used to represent parts of a secret underground facility in the vicinity of Down Street tube station in the 2005 feature film Creep.

Reference is a made to a fictional deep-level air-raid shelter at Holland Park tube station in Ben Aaronovitch’s novel Whispers Under Ground, third in the Rivers of London series.

In the penultimate mission of the video game Watch Dogs: Legion, the Stockwell deep-level shelter is featured as the hideout of the main antagonist, Zero Day.

The Kingsway Telephone Exchange features prominently in the early part of the apocalyptic horror novel Domain (1984) by British author James Herbert.

== See also ==
- Air raid shelter
- Blast shelter
- Civil defence centres in London
- Military citadels under London
- Subterranean London

== References and sources ==
Sources

- Emmerson, A. and Beard, T. (2004) London's Secret Tubes, Capital Transport Publishing, ISBN 1-85414-283-6
