= Tropical (EP) =

EP by Shit and Shine
- Released: 14 October 2014
- Genre: Electronic
- Length: 31:01
- Label: Gangsigns

Shit and Shine chronology
Powder Horn (2014)	Tropical (2014)	Chakin' (2015)

Tropical is an EP by Shit and Shine, released on 14 October 2014 by Gangsigns.

== Track listing ==
All tracks are written by Shit and Shine

Side one
No.	Title	Length
1.	"Be Careful"	4:46
2.	"Can't Be Trusted"	6:10
3.	"Cattapillllarr"	3:39

Side two
No.	Title	Length
1.	"Greenskul"	4:19
2.	"Welly Too Far Away"	5:41
3.	"What's Wrong With Me"	6:26

== Personnel ==
Adapted from the Tropical liner notes.

Shit and Shine

- Craig Clouse – vocals, instruments

Production and additional personnel

- Andrew Smith – cover art

== Release history ==
Region	Date	Label	Format	Catalog
United Kingdom	2014	Gangsigns	LP	GS005
