= 54 Synth-Brass, 38 Metal Guitar, 65 Cathedral =

Studio album by Shit and Shine
- Released: 16 March 2015
- Genre: Experimental rock
- Length: 50:43
- Label: Rocket

Shit and Shine chronology
Chakin' (2015)	54 Synth-Brass, 38 Metal Guitar, 65 Cathedral (2015)	Everybody's a Fuckin Expert (2015)

54 Synth-Brass, 38 Metal Guitar, 65 Cathedral is the ninth studio album by Shit and Shine, released on 16 March 2015 by Rocket Recordings. The album marries the cacophonous noise rock sound of their earlier work with modern dance music, while touching upon krautrock, jazz fusion, funk and electronic music.

== Track listing ==
All tracks are written by Shit and Shine

No.	Title	Length
1.	"Electric Pony 2"	10:03
2.	"C2-6"	9:52
3.	"Cowboy Hat"	3:57
4.	"Goat $hit"	4:34
5.	"Love Your Hair – Hope You Win!"	6:01
6.	"Writing Poetry on Your Forehead With the Tip of a Hunting Knife"	6:50
7.	"Egg MM/Muffin_Pimp Different"	9:26

== Personnel ==
Adapted from the 54 Synth-Brass, 38 Metal Guitar, 65 Cathedral liner notes.

Shit and Shine

- Craig Clouse – vocals, instruments

== Release history ==
Region	Date	Label	Format	Catalog
United Kingdom	2015	Rocket	CD, LP	LAUNCH078
