= Le Grand Larance Prix =

Studio album by Shit and Shine
- Released: January 2011
- Genre: Noise rock
- Length: 79:48
- Label: Riot Season

Shit and Shine chronology
229-2299 Girls Against Shit (2009)	Le Grand Larance Prix (2011)	Jream Baby Jream (2012)

Le Grand Larance Prix is the sixth studio album by Shit and Shine, released in January 2011 by Riot Season.

== Track listing ==
All tracks are written by Shit and Shine

Disc one
No.	Title	Length
1.	"Flirtations at a Cocktail Party"	10:01
2.	"Frankie's Theme"	15:12
3.	"Switching 2 Nite Mode"	14:39
4.	"Frenchy's Automotive"	16:05
5.	"How to Rattle a White Tailed Buck"	14:19
6.	"Klipp"	9:32

== Personnel ==
Adapted from the Le Grand Larance Prix liner notes.

Shit and Shine

- Craig Clouse – vocals, instruments

Production and additional personnel

- Andrew Smith – cover art

== Release history ==
Region	Date	Label	Format	Catalog
United Kingdom	2011	Riot Season	CD	RSDLXEDTN1
Australia	2011	Rock Is Hell	LP	RIP45
