= Stockwell tube station =

London Underground station

Stockwell
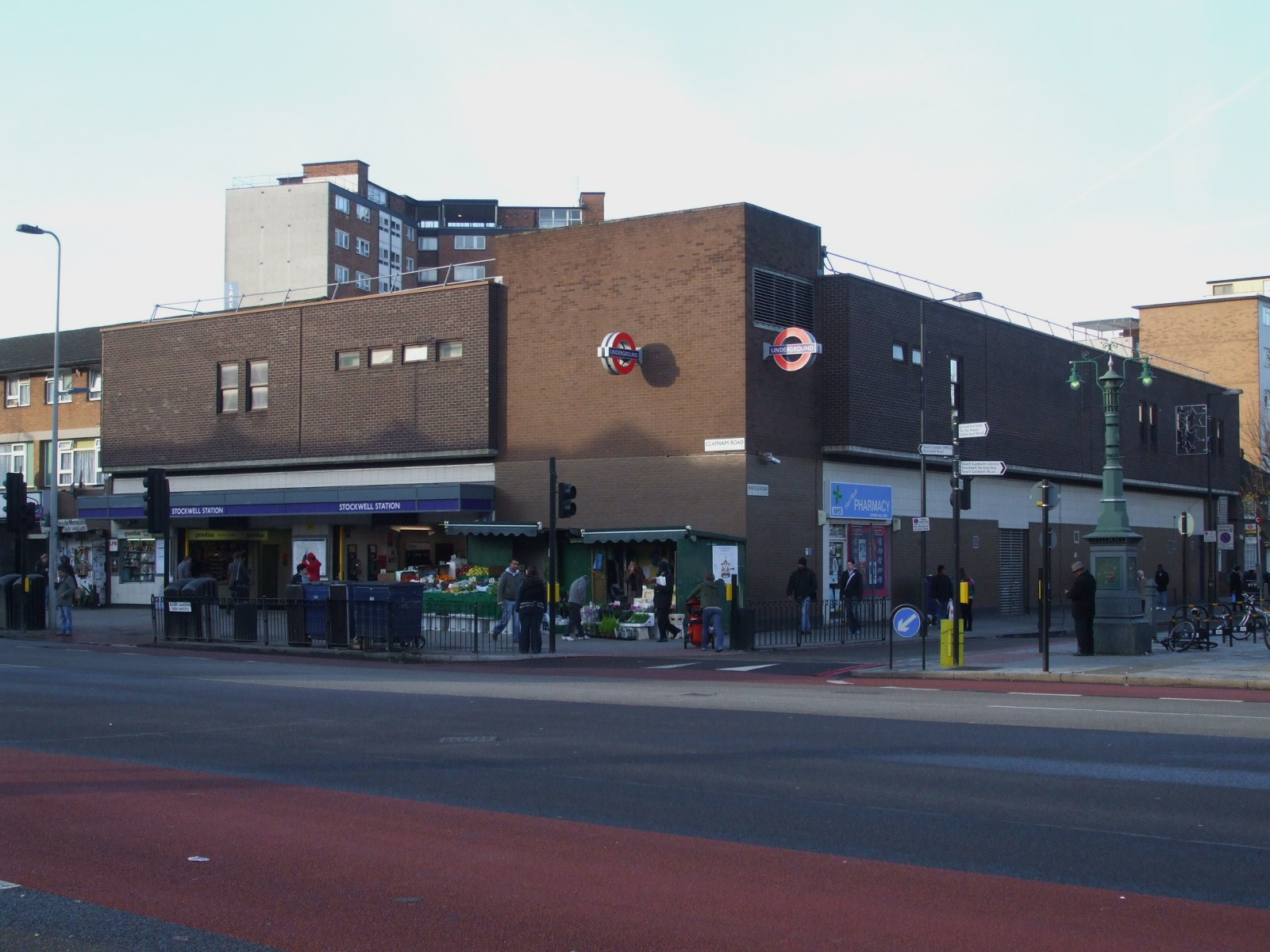
- Station building
- Interactive map of Stockwell

General information
- Location: Stockwell
- Local authority: London Borough of Lambeth
- Managed by: London Underground
- Owner: London Underground
- Number of platforms: 4
- Fare zone: 2

London Underground annual entry and exit
- 2020: ▼5.37 million
- 2021: ▼4.61 million
- 2022: ▲7.46 million
- 2023: ▼7.38 million
- 2024: ▲7.60 million

Key dates
- 4 November 1890: Opened (C&SLR, as a terminus)
- 3 June 1900: Became through station
- 29 November 1923: station closed for rebuilding
- 1 December 1924: station reopened
- 23 July 1971: Opened (Victoria line)

Other information
- External links: TfL station info page
- Coordinates: 51.4725°N 0.1220°W

Stockwell is a London Underground station in Stockwell in the London Borough of Lambeth. It is served by the Northern and Victoria lines, and is in London fare zone 2. On the Morden branch of the Northern line, the station is between Oval and Clapham North stations. On the Victoria line, it is between Brixton and Vauxhall stations.

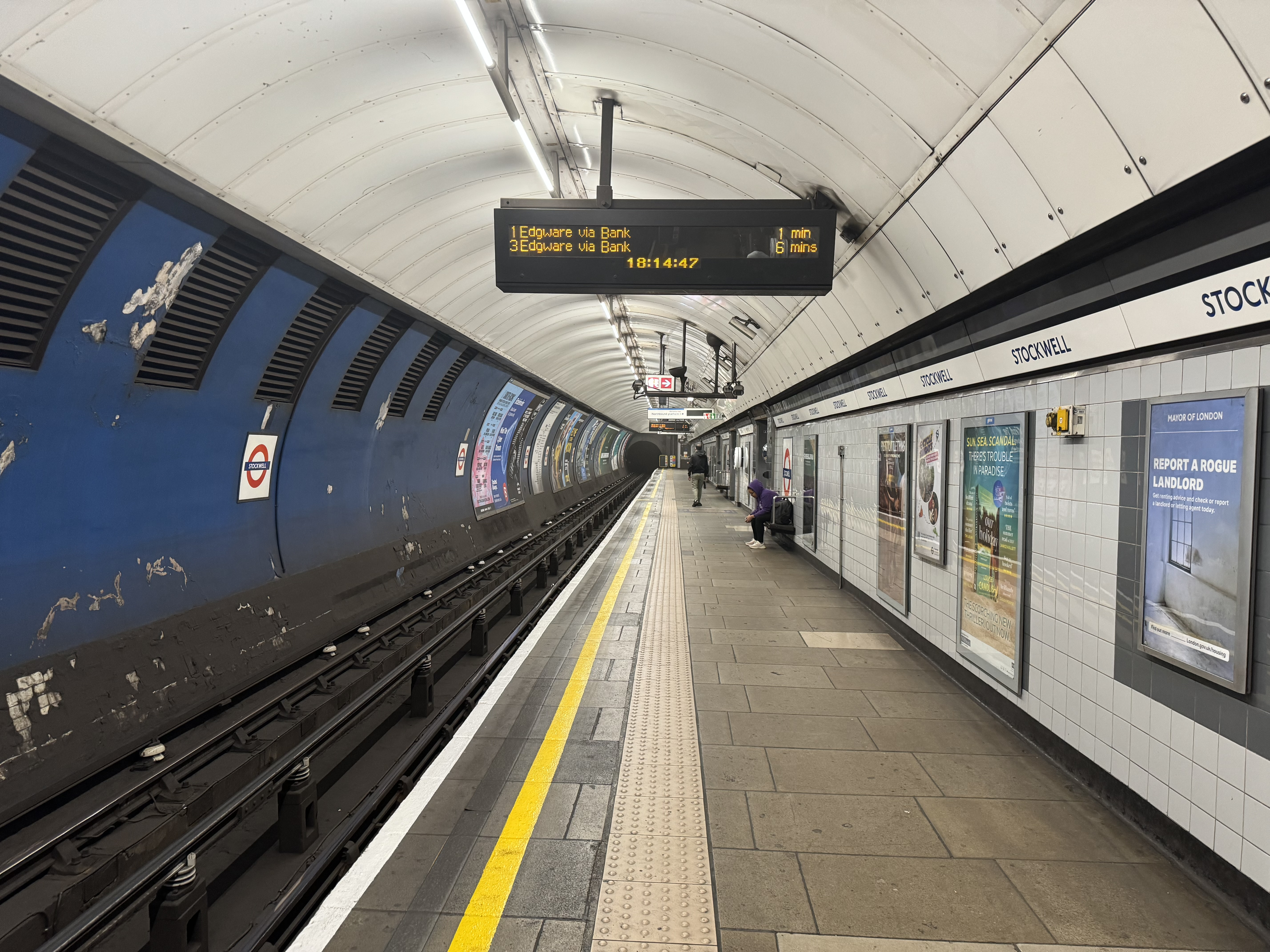
Northern line northbound station platform, July 2024

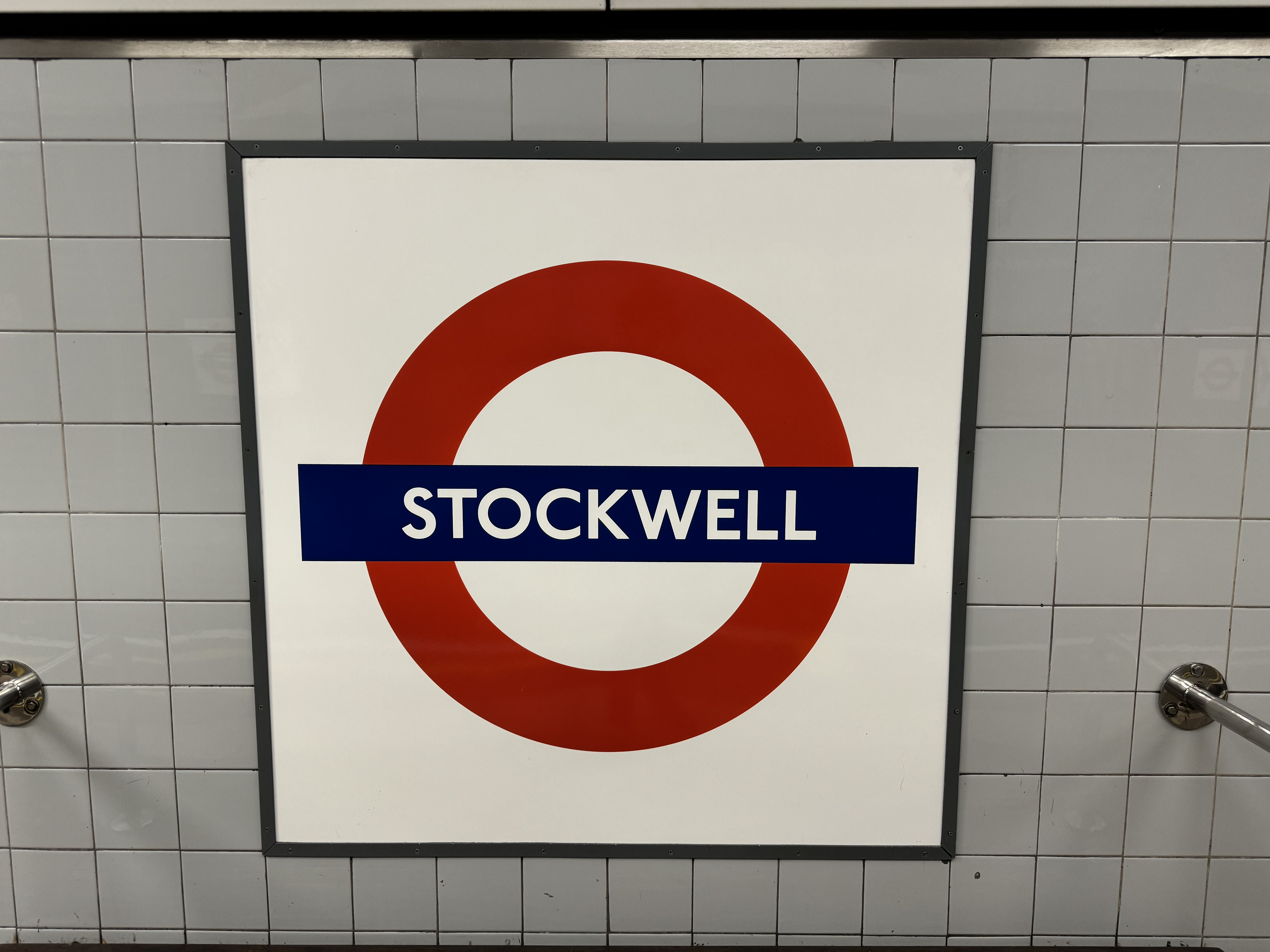
Stockwell station roundel, July 2024

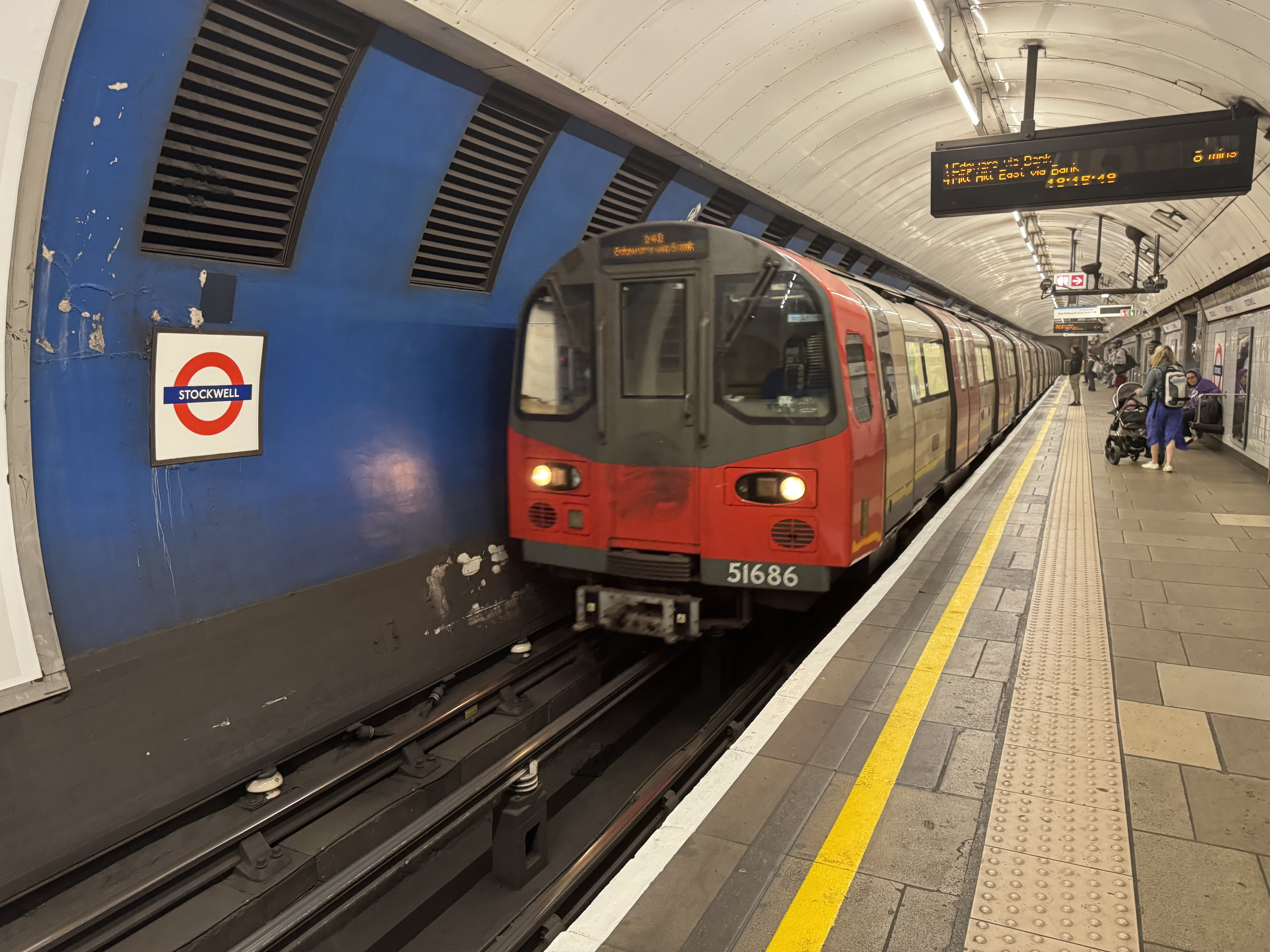
A 1995 stock on the Northern line arrives at the northbound platform, July 2024

The station opened on 4 November 1890 as the southern terminus of the City and South London Railway, the first successful deep-level tube in London. (Note: The first deep-level tube was the short lived cable hauled Tower Subway.) The Victoria interchange opened on 23 July 1971 when that line was extended south from Victoria towards Brixton. The station is known for its World War II air-raid shelters, and for being the location of the shooting of Jean Charles de Menezes.

== History ==
=== Original station ===
Stockwell station was ceremonially opened on 4 November 1890 by the Prince of Wales (later King Edward VII), as the most southerly station on the City and South London Railway (C&SLR) – London's first successful deep-level tube railway. Passenger services began just over one month later on 18 December.

The station was built with a single island platform with tracks on either side, an arrangement that today is rarely used underground on the network but which still exists at Clapham North and Clapham Common. Stockwell's original platform was further north than the new ones, and trains pass it today. The other terminus of the C&SLR line was King William Street in the City of London. On 3 June 1900, when an extension to Clapham Common was opened, Stockwell ceased to be a terminus. A flight of stairs at the south end of the platform was also added to take passengers to a subway that passed over the new northbound tunnel and joined the lift shaft at a higher level.

The original building, designed by T. P. Figgis, was similar to – but larger than – the existing surface building at Kennington with a domed roof to the original lift shaft. The two lifts each carried 50 people to and from the platforms until their replacement by escalators in 1924. The station was modernised in advance of the 1926 extension from Clapham Common to Morden. A new surface building was constructed by Charles Holden on the original site. The original station platforms were closed on 29 November 1923 and platforms sited to the south of the original were opened on 1 December 1924. At the same time the platforms were rebuilt to a larger diameter – and with a single platform in each tunnel – south of the original station tunnel.

=== New station ===
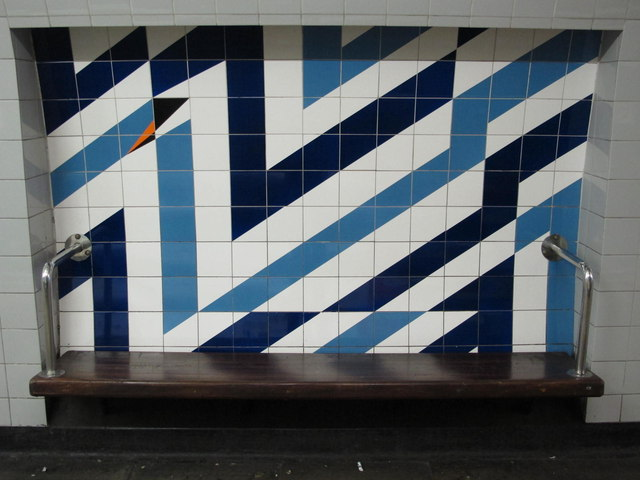
Abstract swan design by Abram Games in the platform recess, photographed in 2014.

The station was expanded to accommodate the Victoria line, whose extension from Victoria to Brixton opened on 23 July 1971. Parallel cross-platform interchanges were provided between the two lines in both directions and the 1920s surface buildings were replaced by a modern structure. A third escalator was added to the existing pair, by constructing an additional shaft. Some construction work disturbed shelter tunnels constructed during war, that had to be re-sited. A British Transport Police (BTP) station was later built above the station in 1985, as part of a BTP initiative to increase police presence across the Underground. As with all Victoria line stations, the platforms feature tiled murals in the seat recesses – the work at Stockwell designed by Abram Games shows a swan, a reference to the nearby Swan public house.

The station has ticket halls, three escalators, seven gates, 13 payphones, a Wi-Fi service, 9 vending machines and a photo booth. The ticket hall has electronic departure boards. The ticket office was closed in early 2015 as part of the TfL investment programme.

== Nearby infrastructure ==
=== Deep-level air-raid shelter ===
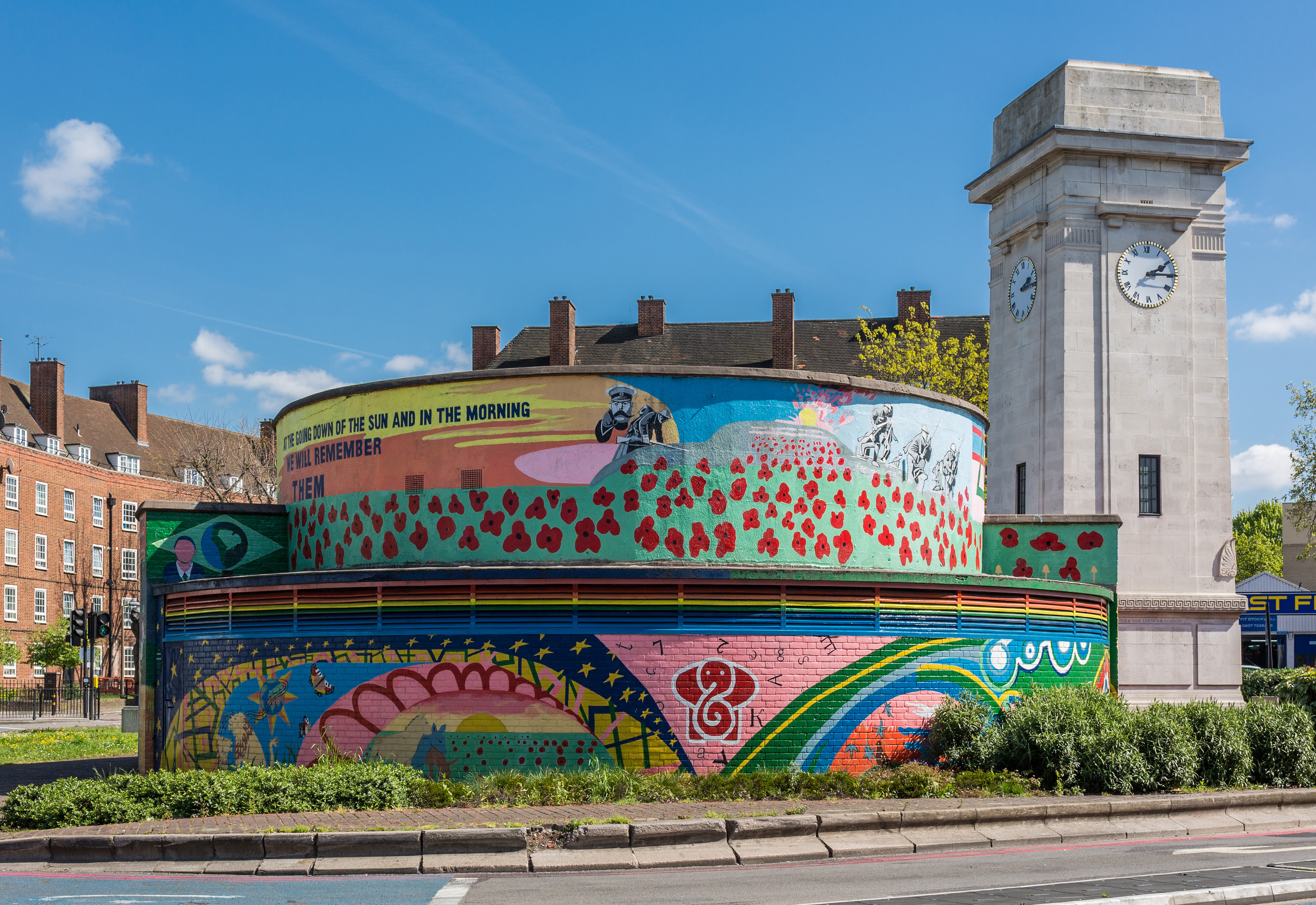
One of the entrances to the Stockwell shelter, now decorated as a war memorial with input from pupils at a local school.

Stockwell is one of eight London Underground stations with an adjacent deep-level air-raid shelter, constructed during World War II. The shelter is below the current station, and comprises two parallel tunnels, each approximately six times the length of the current platform. These tunnels are 16 feet 6 inches (5.03 m) in diameter (wider than the current platforms), split horizontally into upper and lower levels, with various connecting and branch tunnels used for medical posts, lavatories, and ventilation.

The total capacity of the shelter was around 4,000 people. Access was via the station as well as two further entrance shafts containing spiral staircases, one of which is located at the middle of the junction of South Lambeth Road and Clapham Road, and the other on Studley Road. The shelter was completed in September 1942, and was used by the Government until 1944 when it was opened to the public. It was used for one year as a shelter. After the war it was used for a period to billet military personnel. One of the entrances has been brightly decorated and is a recognisable local landmark.

=== Branch tunnel and depot ===
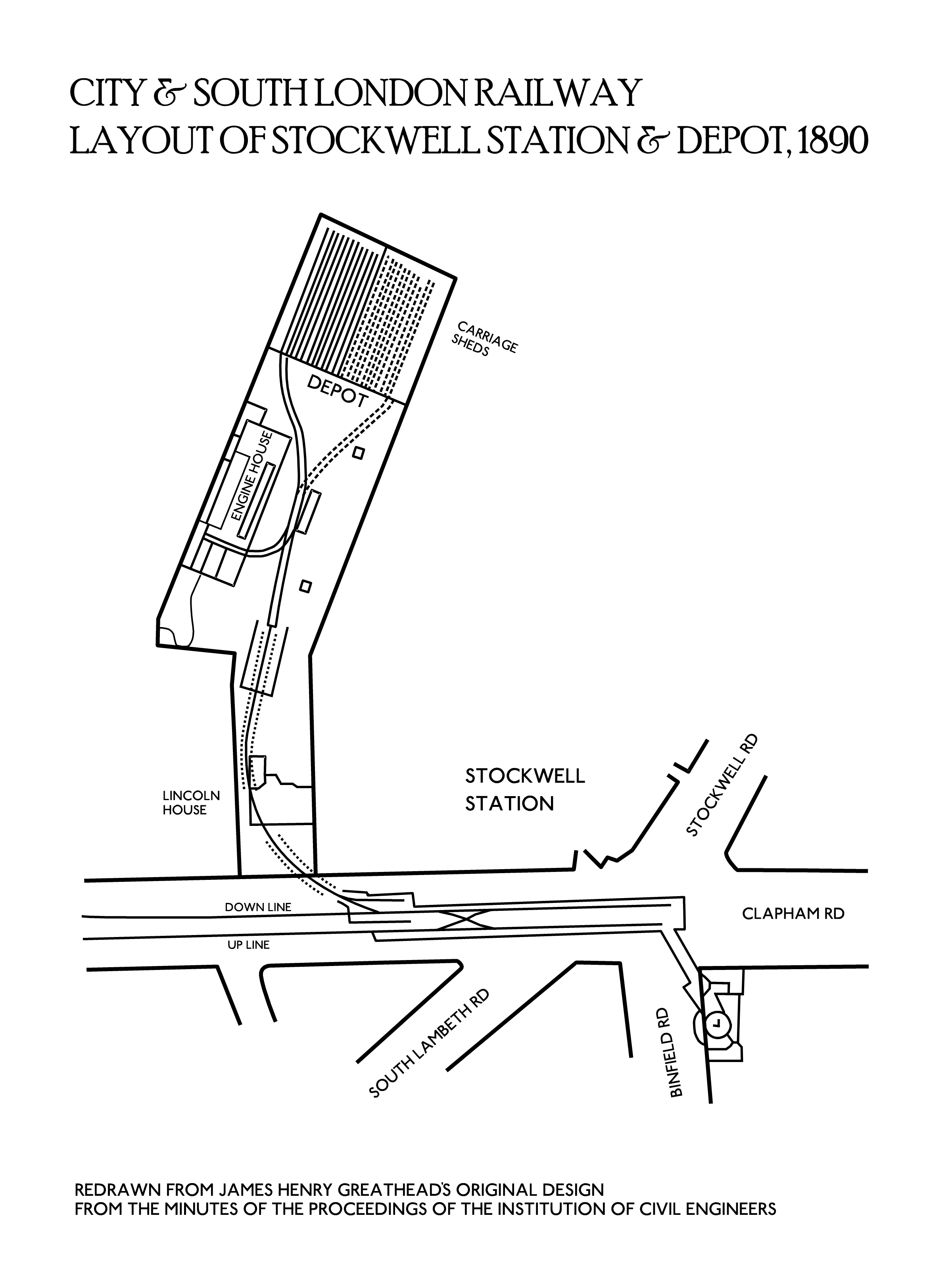
Original layout of Stockwell station and depot

Just north of the station there is a branch tunnel which led to a nearby generating station (closed 1915), depot and workshop located at the junction of Stockwell and Clapham Roads. (Note: Greathead's plan presented to the Institution of Civil Engineers, shows the depot and generating station were on the east side of Clapham Road/Kennington Park Road, approximately where Stockwell Gardens is today.) The tunnel was very steep with an incline of 1:3.5, so rolling stock was originally pulled up to the surface using a wire rope and a winch. This system was replaced in 1907 by a hydraulic lift, which could carry one locomotive or one carriage.

During the 1920s, the line was closed for reconstruction and the depot was used as a working site for transporting spoil, equipment and works traffic in and out of the tunnels. The depot and lift were finally taken out of use at the end of 1924. The incline tunnel and the lift shaft were plugged on the surface and several blocks of flats were constructed on the old depot site by the LCC. These flats still stand (as of 2024), as does one retaining wall of the old depot with distinctive curved buttresses.

== Incidents ==
The mosaic of Jean Charles de Menezes outside Stockwell station

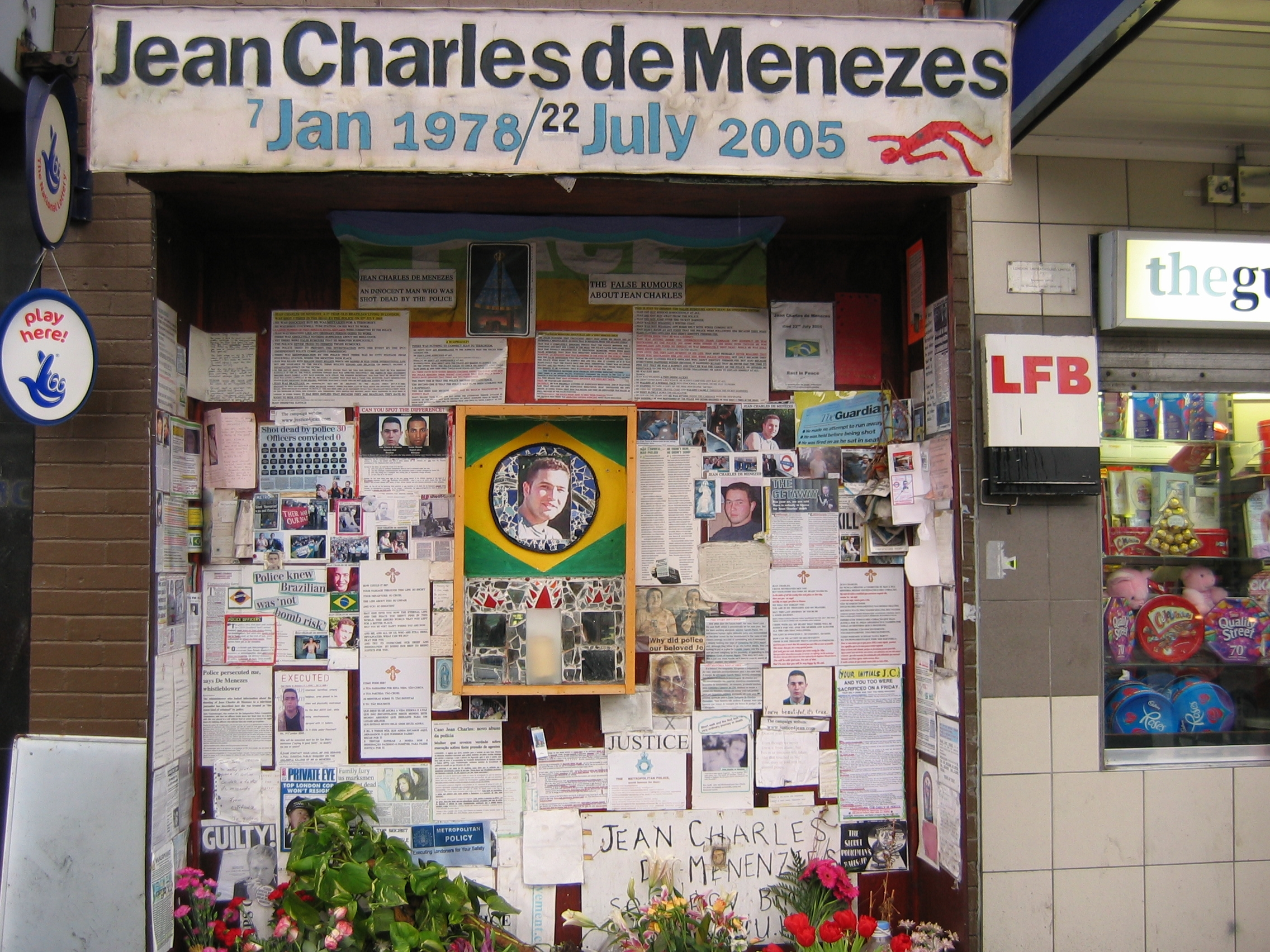
Shrine to Jean Charles de Menezes at Stockwell tube station

On 22 July 2005, Jean Charles de Menezes, a Brazilian electrician living in London, was shot dead by plainclothes police officers at Stockwell station. This incident came a day after the 21 July 2005 London attempted bombings occurred on tube trains and a bus in London. It later emerged that it was a case of mistaken identity on the part of the police and that Menezes had nothing to do with the attacks. In the immediate aftermath of the shooting a small shrine to de Menezes was created by mourners outside the station. This evolved into a permanent memorial mosaic which was unveiled on 7 January 2010 at the station on what would have been his 32nd birthday. It was made by local artist, Mary Edwards, with the help of Menezes' cousin, Vivian Figueiredo, as well as Chrysoula Vardaxi.

== Services ==
Stockwell station is on the Northern and Victoria lines in London fare zone 2. On the Morden branch of the Northern line, the station is between Oval and Clapham North. On the Victoria line, it is between Brixton and Vauxhall. Train frequencies vary throughout the day. However, Northern line trains generally operate every 4–6 minutes between 06:06 and 00:12 in both directions while Victoria line trains generally operate every 3–5 minutes between 06:02 and 00:20 in both directions. There is also 24-hour Night Tube service on both lines on Friday and Saturday evenings.

Preceding station	London Underground	Following station
Oval towards Edgware, Mill Hill East or High Barnet	Northern line Morden branch	Clapham North towards Morden
Brixton Terminus	Victoria line	Vauxhall towards Walthamstow Central

== Connections ==
The station is served by day and nighttime London Bus routes.

== Notes and references ==
=== Bibliography ===
- Butt, R. V. J. (October 1995). The Directory of Railway Stations: details every public and private passenger station, halt, platform and stopping place, past and present (1st ed.). Sparkford: Patrick Stephens Ltd. ISBN 978-1-85260-508-7. OCLC 60251199. OL 11956311M.
- Connor, J.E. (1999). London's Disused Underground Stations. Capital Transport. ISBN 1-85414-250-X.
- Day, John R; Reed, John (2008) [1963]. The Story of London's Underground. Capital Transport. ISBN 978-1-85414-316-7.
- Demuth, Tim (2004). The Spread of London's Underground. Capital Transport. ISBN 1-85414-277-1.
- Horne, M.A.C. (1988). The Victoria Line – A Short History. Douglas Rose. ISBN 978-1-870-35402-8.
- Lawrence, David (1994). Underground Architecture. Capital Transport. ISBN 978-1-854-14160-6.
- Martin, Andrew (2012). Underground, Overground. Profile Books. ISBN 978-1-846-68478-4.
- Wolmar, Christian (2012) [2004]. The Subterranean Railway: How the London Underground Was Built and How It Changed the City Forever. Atlantic Books. ISBN 978-0-857-89069-6.
