= DIAG004 =

EP by Shit and Shine
- Released: 30 September 2013
- Genre: Electronic, trip hop
- Length: 18:39
- Label: Diagonal

Shit and Shine chronology
Jream Baby Jream (2012)	DIAG004 (2013)	Find Out What Happens When People Start Being Polite for a Fucking Change (2013)

DIAG004 is an EP by Shit and Shine, released on 30 September 2013 by Diagonal.

== Track listing ==
All tracks are written by Shit and Shine

Side one
No.	Title	Length
1.	"Blowhannon"	5:35
2.	"Value"	4:03

Side two
No.	Title	Length
1.	"Shower Curtain"	5:17
2.	"Dixie Peach"	3:44

== Personnel ==
Adapted from the DIAG004 liner notes.

Shit and Shine

- Craig Clouse – vocals, instruments

== Release history ==
Region	Date	Label	Format	Catalog
United Kingdom	2013	Diagonal	LP	DIAG004
