= Shit and Shine =

American experimental music project

- Origin: London, England
- Genre: Noise rock
- Years active: 2004–present
- Members: Craig Clouse

Shit and Shine is an experimental music project based in Austin, Texas. Formed in London in 2004 by bandleader Craig Clouse, its percussion-driven sound mixes noise with electronics. Clouse is the only consistent member, with an ever-rotating line-up of musicians.

== History ==
The project was picked up by the Riot Season label, who issued their debut You're Lucky to Have Friends Like Us in 2004. The band's second album, titled Ladybird, was released in 2005 and contained a forty-two minute improvisation built on a repetitive drum rhythm, which critics compared to Velvet Underground's 1967 composition "Sister Ray". The album Jealous of Shit and Shine followed in 2006 and continued to explore terrifying soundscapes. In 2011, it was placed at number eighty-eight on NME's The 100 Greatest Albums You've Never Heard list.

2008's Cherry was the band's first full-length album in two years. Jason Crock of Pitchfork noted that the "abrupt jump-cut edits don't always serve the individual track, but they give the record as a whole its own energy and peculiar logic" and that "the execution isn't perfect on every track, certainly, but Cherry is a great example of a record becoming more than the sum of its parts."

== Discography ==
Studio albums

- You're Lucky to Have Friends Like Us (2004)
- Ladybird (2005)
- Jealous of Shit and Shine (2006)
- Cherry (2008)
- 229-2299 Girls Against Shit (2009)
- Le Grand Larance Prix (2011)
- Jream Baby Jream (2012)
- Powder Horn (2014)
- 54 Synth-Brass, 38 Metal Guitar, 65 Cathedral (2015)
- Everybody's a Fuckin Expert (2015)
- Some People Really Know How To Live (2017)
- Bad Vibes (2018)
- NO NO NO NO (2019)
- Malibu Liquor Store (2020)
- New Confusion (2022)

Live albums

- Shit and Shine (2009)
- Live in Graz (2010)
- SXSW Showcase (2012)
- Live on WFMU on Brian Turner's Show 02-26-13 (2013)

Compilation albums

- Küss Mich, Meine Liebe (2008)
- Chakin' (2015)

Extended plays

- Toilet Door Tits (2006)
- Cunts With Roses (2007)
- DIAG004 (2013)
- Find Out What Happens When People Start Being Polite for a Fucking Change (2013)
- Tropical (2014)

Singles

- "Charm and Counter-Charm" (2007)
- "Cigarette Sequence" (2007)
- "Bass Puppy" (2010)
- "Shit Split" (2011)
- "Collisions 03" (2012)
- "Trost Jukebox Series #4" (2015)
