= Jealous of Shit and Shine =

Studio album by Shit and Shine
- Released: 9 November 2006
- Genre: Noise rock
- Length: 61:34
- Label: Riot Season

Shit and Shine chronology
Ladybird (2005)	Jealous of Shit and Shine (2006)	Toilet Door Tits (2006)

Jealous of Shit and Shine is the third studio album by Shit and Shine, released on 9 November 2006 by Riot Season.

== Legacy ==
Year	Publication	Country	Accolade	Rank
2011	NME	United Kingdom	The 100 Greatest Albums You've Never Heard	89

== Track listing ==
All tracks are written by Shit and Shine, except "Practicing to Be a Doctor" by Fritz Noble and Stan Seitrich.

No.	Title	Length
1.	"Here Comethe Vikings"	2:03
2.	"When Extreme Dogs Go Wrong"	5:13
3.	"No Darling, Its a Pentagram"	3:18
4.	"Unchained Ladies Shopper"	4:18
5.	"There Are 2 Bakers Now"	7:20
6.	"Practicing to Be a Doctor" (Strangulated Beatoffs cover)	30:33
7.	"Kitten Mask"	2:44
8.	"Hot Vodka"	4:26
9.	"Seeing Life Through a Young Mans Eyes"	1:39

== Personnel ==
Adapted from the Jealous of Shit and Shine liner notes.

Shit and Shine

- Craig Clouse – vocals, instruments

== Release history ==
Region	Date	Label	Format	Catalog
United Kingdom	2006	Riot Season	CD	REPOSE 011
United Kingdom	2015	Riot Season	LP	REPOSE 011
