= New Wandsworth railway station =

Former railway station in England

New Wandsworth
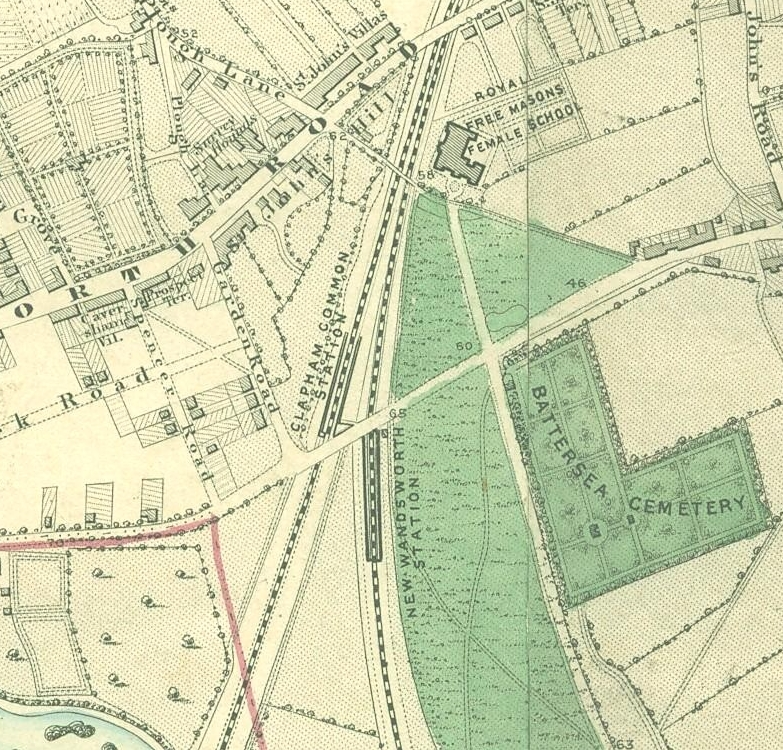
- New Wandsworth station, 1862
- Interactive map of New Wandsworth

General information
- Location: Wandsworth
- Owner: West End of London and Crystal Palace Railway

Key dates
- 1858: Opened
- 1869: Closed
- Replaced by: Wandsworth Common

Other information
- Coordinates: 51.4587°N 0.1727°W

New Wandsworth was a railway station in Wandsworth. The station was opened by the West End of London and Crystal Palace Railway on the 29 March 1858 when the railway extended its line from Wandsworth to Pimlico. It closed on 1 November 1869, six years after Clapham Junction had opened a short distance to the north and was replaced by Wandsworth Common station.

The station was close to the London and South Western Railway's Clapham Common station located on a separate line, with both stations being open between 1858 and 1863.

Preceding station	Historical railways	Following station
Pimlico	West End of London and Crystal Palace Railway (March–June 1858)	Wandsworth
Pimlico	West End of London and Crystal Palace Railway (1858–1860)	Balham
Victoria	London, Brighton and South Coast Railway (1860–1863)	Balham
Clapham Junction	London, Brighton and South Coast Railway (1863–1869)	Balham
