= Küss Mich, Meine Liebe =

Compilation album by Shit and Shine
- Released: 16 June 2008
- Genre: Noise rock
- Length: 56:37
- Label: Load

Shit and Shine chronology
Cherry (2008)	Küss Mich, Meine Liebe (2008)	229-2299 Girls Against Shit (2009)

Professional ratings
Review scores
Source	Rating
Allmusic	4/5 stars

Küss Mich, Meine Liebe is a compilation album by Shit and Shine, released on 16 June 2008 by Load Records.

== Track listing ==
All tracks are written by Shit and Shine

No.	Title	Length
1.	"Biggest Cock in Christendom"	15:46
2.	"Taking Robe Off"	1:02
3.	"The Germans Call It Swimming Head"	4:38
4.	"The Side of the Road"	3:24
5.	"Mr. and Mrs. Gingerbread Hawaii"	1:14
6.	"Toilet Door Tits"	14:40
7.	"Preventions Arise"	10:37
8.	"Küss Mich, Meine Liebe"	3:24

== Personnel ==
Adapted from the Küss Mich, Meine Liebe liner notes.

Shit and Shine

- Craig Clouse – vocals, instruments

Production and additional personnel

- Pete Simonelli – vocals (7)

== Release history ==
Region	Date	Label	Format	Catalog
United Kingdom	2008	Load	CD, LP	load 102
