= Everybody's a Fuckin Expert =

Studio album by Shit and Shine
- Released: 4 September 2015
- Genre: Electronic, IDM
- Length: 59:40
- Label: Editions Mego

Shit and Shine chronology
54 Synth-Brass, 38 Metal Guitar, 65 Cathedral (2015)	Everybody's a Fuckin Expert (2015)

Everybody's a Fuckin Expert is the tenth studio album by Shit and Shine, released on 4 September 2015 by Editions Mego.

== Track listing ==
All tracks are written by Shit and Shine

No.	Title	Length
1.	"Signal Failure"	4:57
2.	"Upside Down Cheeseburger"	5:10
3.	"Bus Station"	3:01
4.	"Wespennest"	8:59
5.	"Hay Ride"	5:10
6.	"Chop the Night"	3:29
7.	"Workin on My Fitness"	4:06
8.	"Picnic Table"	3:50
9.	"Ass"	4:31
10.	"Rastplatz"	6:17
11.	"Stockwell"	4:46
12.	"Clapham North"	5:20

== Personnel ==
Adapted from the Everybody's a Fuckin Expert liner notes.

Shit and Shine

- Craig Clouse – vocals, instruments

Production and additional personnel

- Josey Clouse – cover art, photography
- Christoph Grote-Beverborg – mastering
- Stephen O'Malley – design

== Release history ==
Region	Date	Label	Format	Catalog
Austria	2015	Editions Mego	CD, LP	eMEGO212
