= Clapham North tube station =

London Underground station

Clapham North
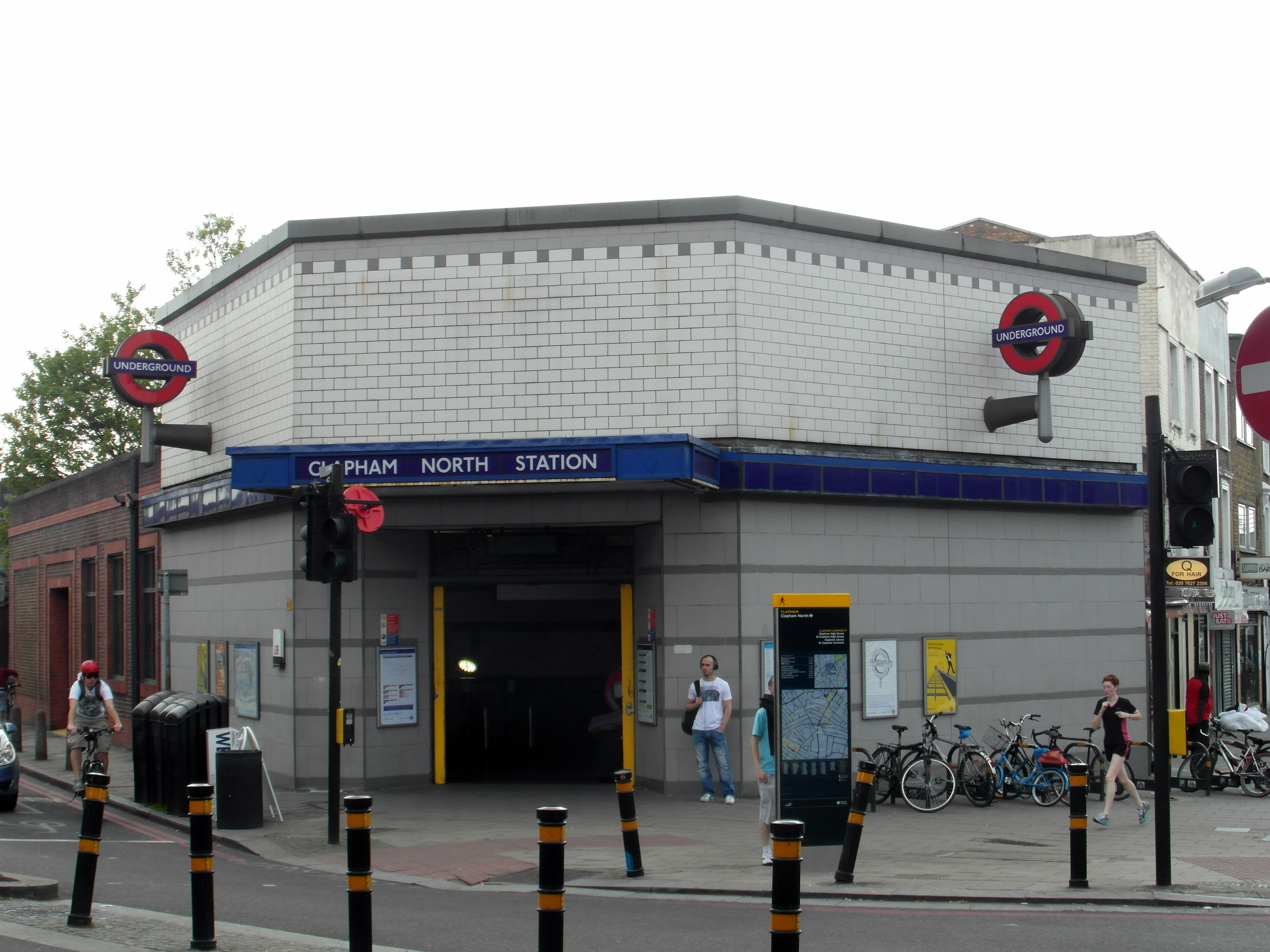
- Station entrance
- Interactive map of Clapham North

General information
- Location: Clapham
- Local authority: London Borough of Lambeth
- Managed by: London Underground
- Owner: London Underground
- Number of platforms: 2
- Fare zone: 2
- OSI: Clapham High Street

London Underground annual entry and exit
- 2021: ▲3.27 million
- 2022: ▲5.22 million
- 2023: ▼5.21 million
- 2024: ▼4.96 million
- 2025: ▼5.78 million

Railway companies
- Original company: City and South London Railway

Key dates
- 3 June 1900: Opened as Clapham Road
- 29 November 1923: closed for rebuilding
- 1 December 1924: reopened
- 13 September 1926: Renamed Clapham North

Other information
- External links: TfL station info page
- Coordinates: 51.465°N 0.13°W

Clapham North (/ˈklæpəm ˈnɔːrθ/) is a London Underground station in Clapham, London. It is on the Morden branch of the Northern line, between Stockwell and Clapham Common stations. It is in London fare zone 2.

The station is located at the northern end of Clapham High Street, and a short walk away from Clapham High Street railway station. Although there is no direct interchange between the two, it is counted as an Out of Station Interchange, meaning that journeys involving a change between the two are charged as a single journey.

Clapham North and Clapham Common are the only below-ground stations on the network with narrow island platforms.

== History ==
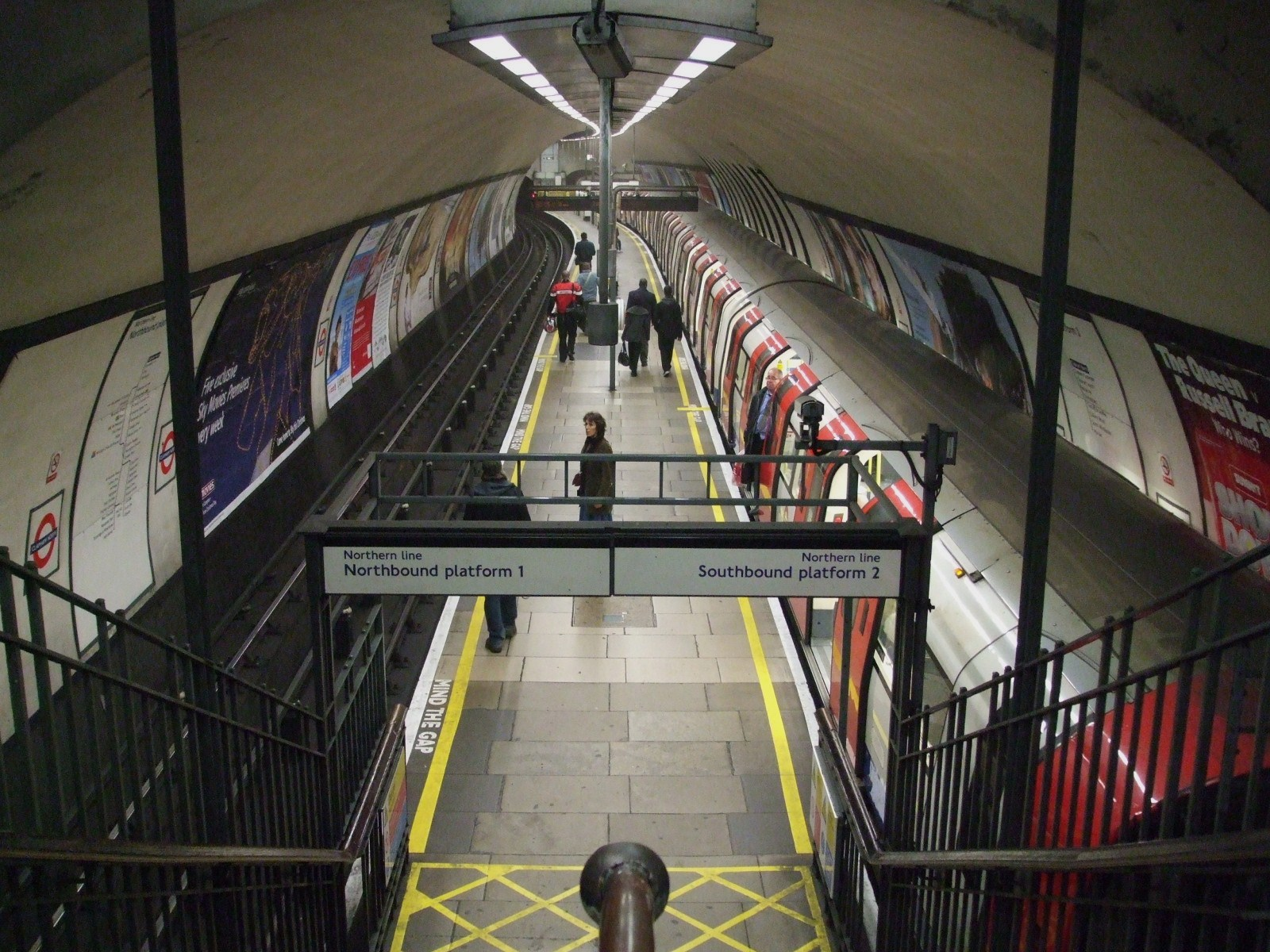
The Northern line platforms at Clapham North. This island platform and the one at Clapham Common are the narrowest on the London Underground.

The station opened as Clapham Road on 3 June 1900 as part of an extension of the City and South London Railway to Clapham Common, one stop to the south. The station, designed by T. P. Figgis, is one of two remaining stations that has an island platform in the station tunnel, serving both the northbound and southbound lines; the other being Clapham Common. The original station building was replaced in 1924, when the line was modernised and the original building was remodelled by Charles Holden. The ticket hall was rebuilt after the installation of escalators and Figgis's station facade was replaced with biscuit-cream faience slabs and black coping tiles to the parapet walls. In turn, the station's corner entrance block was reclad in post-modern style tiles in c1996, the lower side wings retain their 1920s elevations. The station's name was changed to Clapham North on 13 September 1926 after the line was extended to Morden that year.

Clapham North and Clapham Common are the only stations left on the network that are physically underground with narrow island platforms, around 3.7 metres (12 ft) wide. In September 2024, TfL indicated that they had no plans to widen the platforms due to the high cost of doing so – despite safety concerns raised by the RAIB following an incident at Clapham Common in May 2023.

Clapham North is one of eight London Underground stations which has a deep-level air-raid shelter beneath it.

== Connections ==
London Buses routes serve the station day and night.

== Trivia ==
"Clapham North" is the title of the last track on the album Everybody's a Fuckin Expert by London- and Texas-based noise rock band Shit and Shine.

| Preceding station | London Underground | Following station |
|---|---|---|
| Stockwell towards Edgware, Mill Hill East or High Barnet | Northern line Morden branch | Clapham Common towards Morden |
