= Clapham Common railway station =

Railway station in London, England

Clapham Common
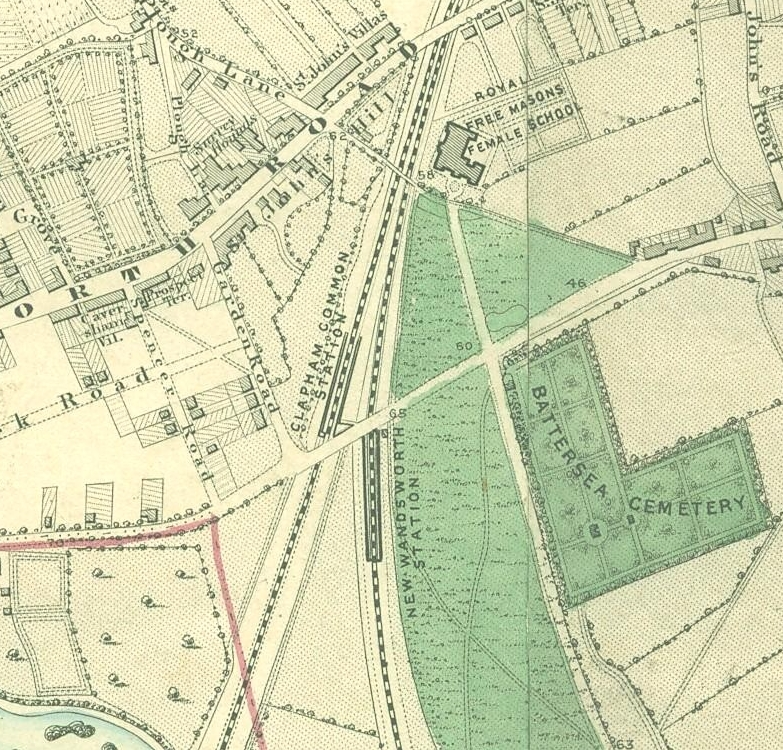
- Clapham Common station, 1863
- Interactive map of Clapham Common

General information
- Location: Clapham
- Owner: London and South Western Railway

Key dates
- 1838: Opened as Wandsworth
- 1846: renamed Clapham Common
- 1863: Closed
- Replaced by: Clapham Junction

Other information
- Coordinates: 51.4594°N 0.1733°W

Clapham Common was a railway station in Clapham formerly located between Vauxhall and Wimbledon stations. The station was opened by the London and South Western Railway on the 21 May 1838 as Wandsworth when the company opened its line from Nine Elms to Woking. Renamed in 1846, it closed on 2 March 1863 when Clapham Junction was opened in its place.

The station was close to the West End of London and Crystal Palace Railway's New Wandsworth station located on a separate line, with both stations being open between 1858 and 1863 before being replaced by a combined station at Clapham Junction.

Preceding station	Historical railways	Following station
Wimbledon	London & South Western Railway (1838–1848)	Nine Elms
Wimbledon	London & South Western Railway (1848–1863)	Vauxhall
