= Clapham Common tube station =

London Underground station

Clapham Common
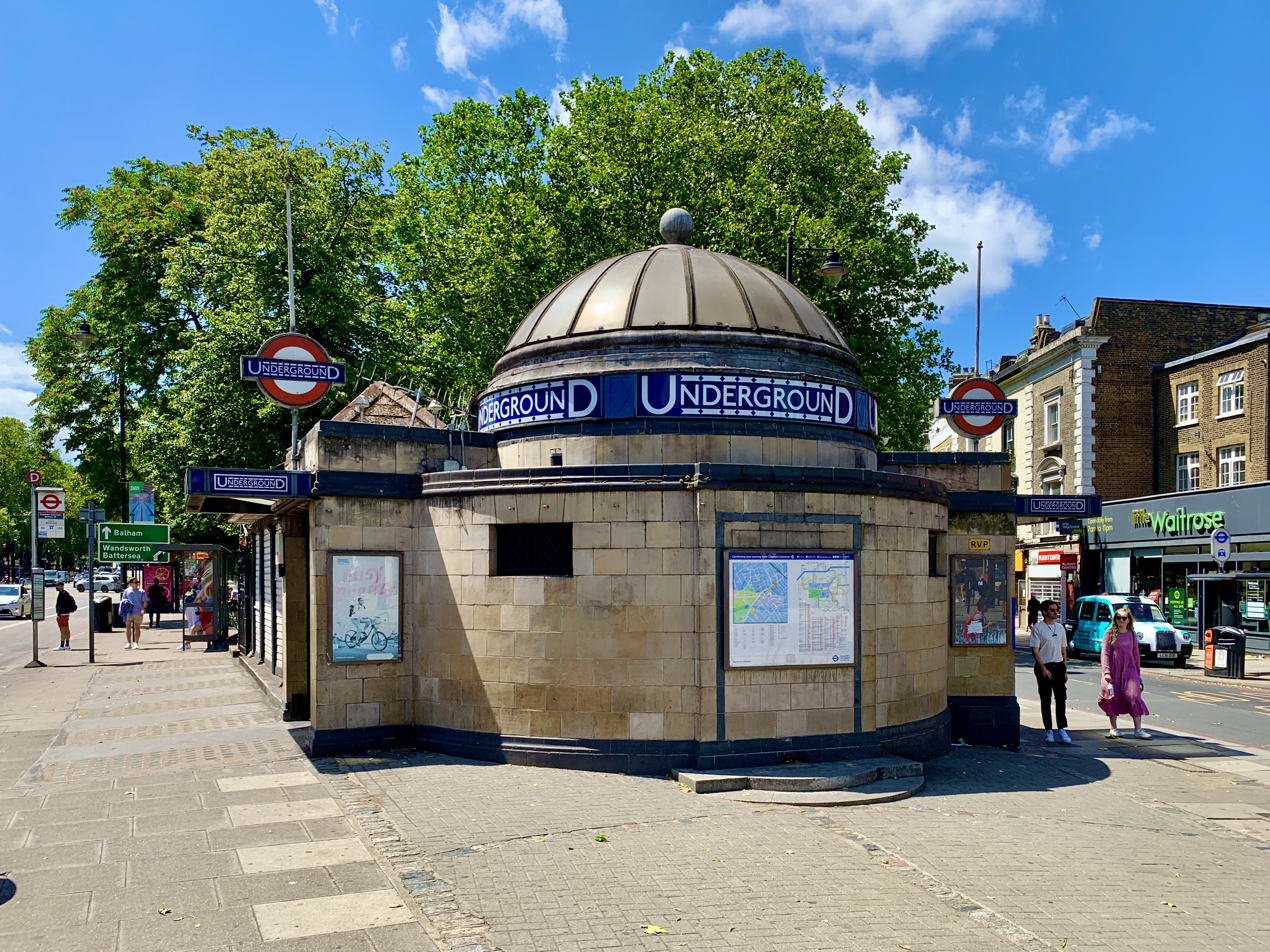
- Station building
- Interactive map of Clapham Common

General information
- Location: Clapham
- Local authority: Lambeth
- Managed by: London Underground
- Owner: London Underground
- Number of platforms: 2
- Fare zone: 2

London Underground annual entry and exit
- 2020: ▼4.50 million
- 2021: ▲4.71 million
- 2022: ▲7.71 million
- 2023: ▲8.04 million
- 2024: ▲8.12 million

Key dates
- 3 June 1900: Opened as terminus (C&SLR)
- 29 November 1923: Closed for rebuilding
- 1 December 1924: Reopened
- 13 September 1926: Became through station

Listed status
- Listing grade: II
- Entry number: 1065005
- Added to list: 27 March 1981; 45 years ago

Other information
- External links: TfL station info page
- Coordinates: 51.4617°N 0.1382°W

Clapham Common (/ˈklæpəm ˈkɒmən/) is a London Underground station in Clapham within the London Borough of Lambeth. It is on the Morden branch of the Northern line, between Clapham North and Clapham South stations. It is in London fare zone 2.

== History ==
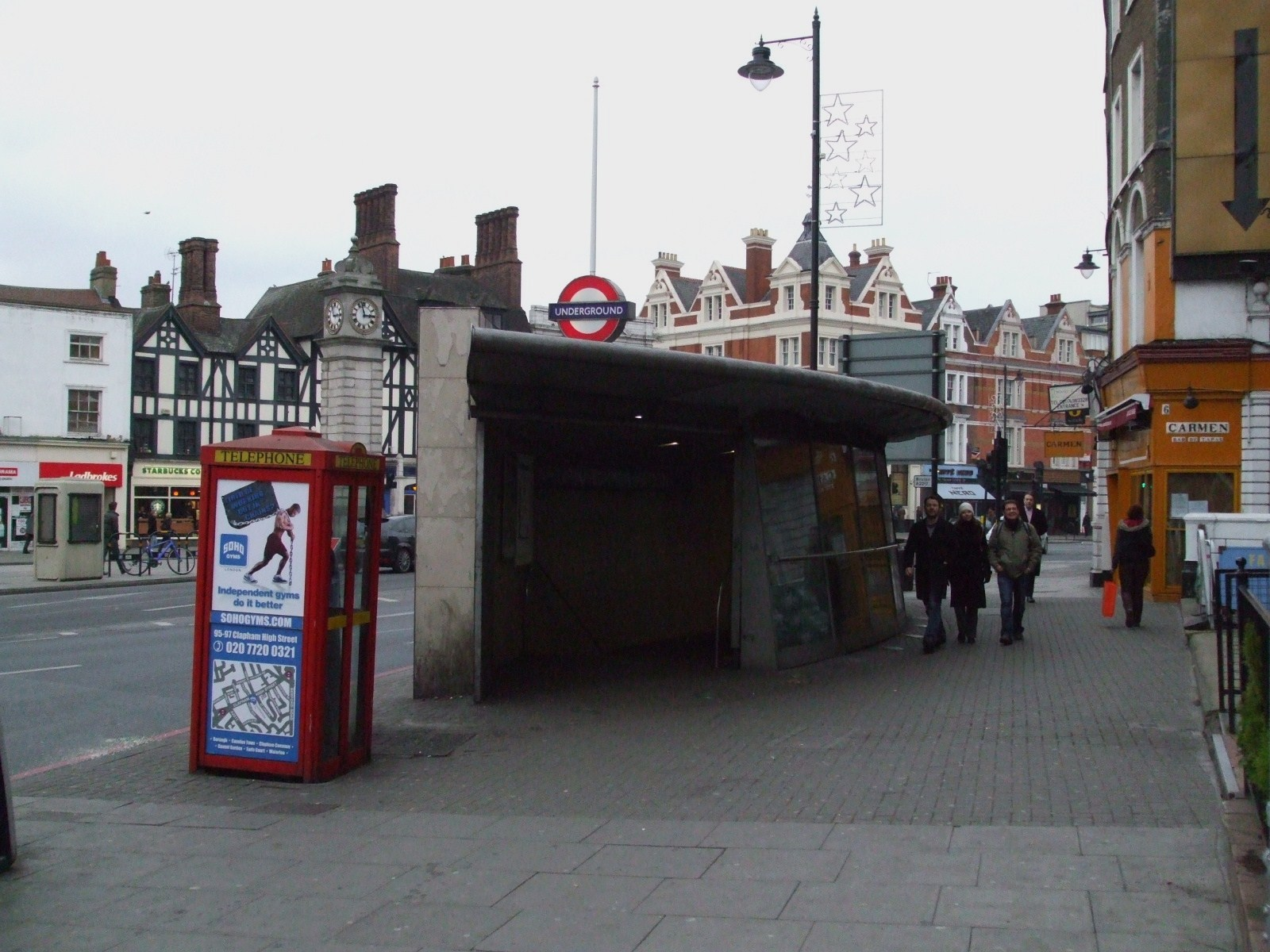
The new glass entrance pavilion at Clapham Common South Side

The station is at the eastern tip of Clapham Common and was opened on 3 June 1900 as the new southern terminus of the City and South London Railway, which was extended from Stockwell. It remained the terminus until the Morden extension was opened on 13 September 1926.

In May 2023, a carriage of a packed rush-hour train began to fill with smoke, with passengers smashing windows to escape. The subsequent Rail Accident Investigation Branch (RAIB) investigation noted that passengers became panicked by a combination of factors, including smoke and a burning smell, closed train doors, no onboard announcement and "perceived inaction" by staff. The RAIB also noted that the narrow platforms at the station meant the incident “had the potential to have more serious consequences”.

=== Advertising ===
For 2 weeks in September 2016, all of the adverts used in the station were replaced by photos of cats. This was an initiative paid for on crowdfunding site Kickstarter and organized by an organisation called The Citizens Advertising Takeover Service (C.A.T.S).

In January 2017, as part of the initiative Veganuary, PETA took over the station informing and encouraging commuters to adopt veganism for the month.

== The station today ==
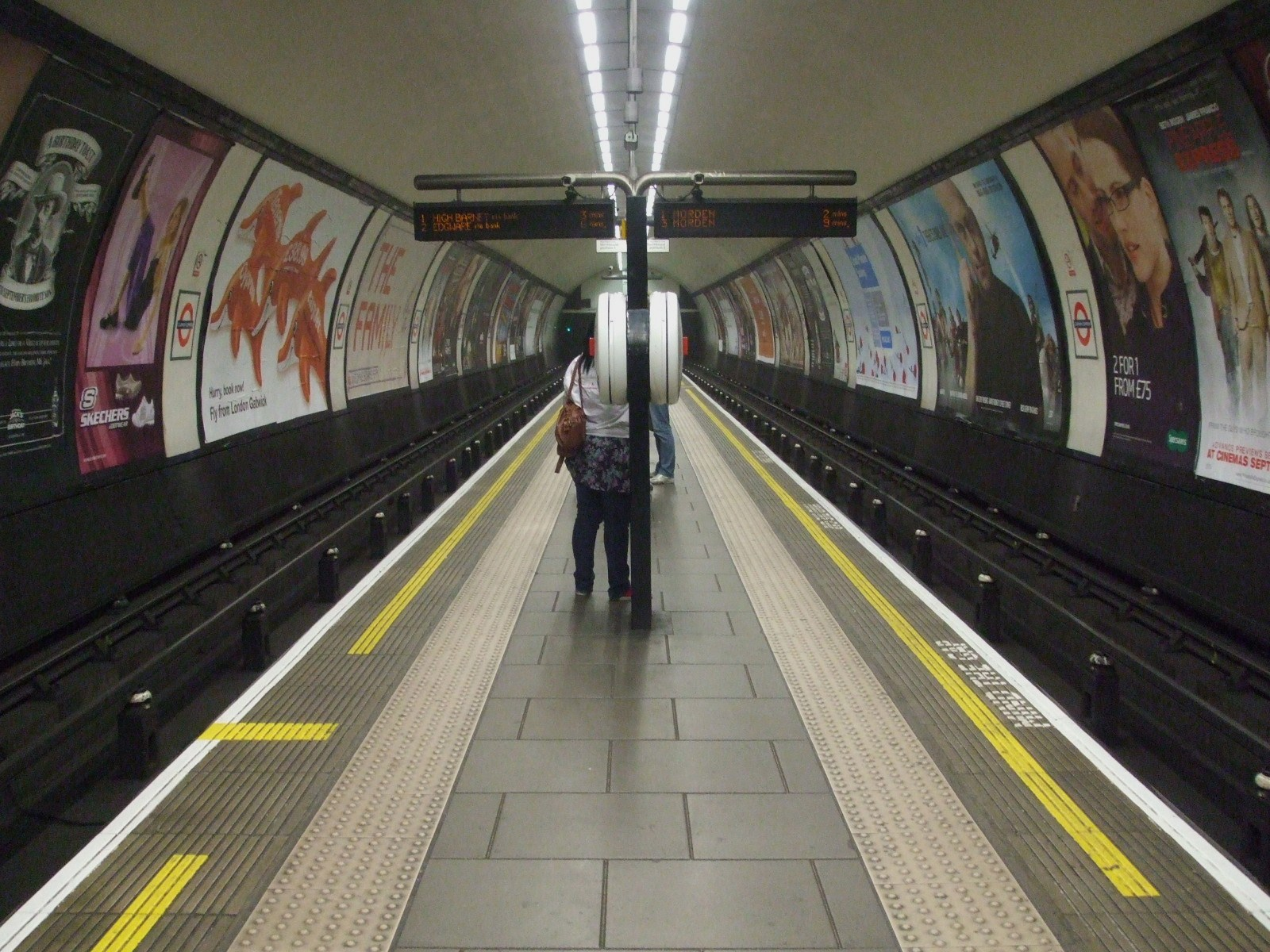
The island platform looking north, showing the narrow width of the platform(s), similar to Clapham North

The station has two entrances, one at the west via a domed building dating from the 1920s, and one at the east via a modern curved-steel and glass pavilion.

Clapham Common and Clapham North are the only stations left on the network that are physically underground with narrow island platforms, around 3.7 metres (12 ft) wide. In September 2024, TfL indicated that they had no plans to widen the platforms due to the high cost of doing so – despite safety concerns raised by the RAIB.

Clapham Common is one of eight London Underground stations that have a deep-level air-raid shelter underneath them. Both entrances to the shelter are north of the station on Clapham High Street.

== Services ==
Clapham Common station is on the Morden branch of the Northern line in London fare zone 2. It is between Clapham North to the north and Clapham South to the south. Train frequencies vary throughout the day, but generally operate every 2–6 minutes between 06:09 and 00:21 in both directions.

== Connections ==
A large number of London Buses routes serve the station day and night.

Preceding station	London Underground	Following station
Clapham North towards Edgware, Mill Hill East or High Barnet	Northern line Morden branch	Clapham South towards Morden
