= Sydney (disambiguation) =

Sydney is the state capital of New South Wales and the most populous city in Australia.

Sydney may also refer to:

== Places ==
=== Australia ===
- City of Sydney, inner city local government area of New South Wales
- Sydney central business district, which is officially the suburb of "Sydney, New South Wales"
- Electoral district of Sydney, electorate in state parliament of New South Wales
- Division of Sydney, electorate in federal parliament of Australia
- Sydney Island, Queensland

=== Canada ===
- Sydney, Nova Scotia
- North Sydney, Nova Scotia

=== United States ===
- Sydney, Florida, unincorporated community

== Film and television ==
- Sydney (film), the original title of the 1996 Hard Eight (film)
- Sydney (TV series), a 1990 CBS TV series
- Sydney Film Festival, an annual competitive film festival held in Sydney, Australia
- Sydney Film School, a private film school based in Waterloo, a suburb of Sydney
- Sydney Filmmakers Co-operative, was a co-operative of independent filmmakers

== Transportation ==
- Blackburn Sydney, a British flying boat
- HMAS Sydney, several warships in the Royal Australian Navy
- Sydney (ship), an Australian cargo ship

== People ==
- Sydney (name), including a list of people and characters with the name
- Robert Yates (politician) (1738–1801), American politician and presumed author with pseudonym "Sydney"

== Other uses ==
- Sydney Accord
- Sydney Declaration
- Sydney language
- University of Sydney
- Sydney FC, a professional soccer club
- "Sydney", a song by Puddle of Mudd from Life On Display
- "Sydney", a song by Caravan Palace from Panic
- Sydney (Microsoft), an early codename for Microsoft Copilot

== See also ==
- Sydney White, a 2007 film starring Amanda Bynes
- Sydney Cove, a small bay on the southern shore of Sydney Harbour
- Sydney Heads, that form the two-kilometre-wide entrance to Sydney Harbour
- Sydney Parade Avenue, Ireland
- Sydnee (disambiguation)
- Sidney (disambiguation)
- Sidnei
- Sid (disambiguation)
- Syd (disambiguation)
