= Honor Oak station =

Honor Oak station may refer to:

- Honor Oak railway station, a former station on the Nunhead to Crystal Palace line, which was open from 1865 to 1954.
- Honor Oak Park railway station, a currently open station on the Brighton Main Line, created in 1886.
