= Honor Oak railway station =

Former railway station in England

Honor Oak

General information
- Location: Honor Oak, Lewisham; England
- Coordinates: 51.4498°N 0.0586°W
- Grid reference: TQ350740
- Platforms: 2

Other information
- Status: Disused

History
- Original company: Crystal Palace and South London Junction Railway
- Pre-grouping: London, Chatham and Dover Railway; South Eastern and Chatham Railway
- Post-grouping: Southern Railway

Key dates
- 1 December 1865: Station opened
- 1 January 1917: Temporarily closed
- 1 March 1919: Reopened
- 22 May 1944: Temporarily closed
- 4 March 1946: Reopened
- 20 September 1954: Station closed
Location

Honor Oak railway station was a station opened in December 1865 in Honor Oak, London by the London, Chatham and Dover Railway on the Crystal Palace and South London Junction Railway. The line was built to carry passengers to The Crystal Palace after its move from Hyde Park. The station featured two wooden platforms, and apart from two brief closures during World War I and World War II, it remained open until 1954 when the entire branch line was closed. The station was demolished around 1956–7 and afterwards the site has been redeveloped with housing.

Honor Oak railway station was about half a mile west of Honor Oak Park railway station which remains open.

== Description ==
Honor Oak station was located in the Honor Oak suburb of south London, to the south of Forest Hill Road and to the east of Wood Vale. The Camberwell Old Cemetery is across Wood Vale to the left. It was situated on the Crystal Palace and South London Junction Railway branch line, which ran from the Lewisham line at Nunhead to a terminus at Crystal Palace (High Level) railway station.

The station had two wooden platforms, situated on the outside of the tracks, with a small shelter on each. It was built on an embankment, which was prone to slippage over the years, affecting the level and alignment of the platforms. A subway passed under the tracks, and in the station's early years there was a booking office, situated in a wooden building to the east of the station. This was eventually closed and tickets were subsequently sold on the platforms. The station had a 13-lever signal box, which remained in use until closure in 1954. Honor Oak was the only station on the line between the two termini to feature a goods yard. This was located to the south of the station, on the western side of the tracks and had three sidings with capacity for twenty-five wagons. The yard was accessed via a road entrance on Wood Vale.

== History ==
In 1851, the Great Exhibition was held in central London's Hyde Park, in a large purpose-built glass and iron building known as the "Crystal Palace". At the conclusion of the exhibition, the building's designer, Sir Joseph Paxton, decided to relocate the building to some land in the Sydenham Hill in south London, creating a permanent public amenity which he dubbed as a "winter park and garden under glass". The palace was dismantled in Hyde Park, and rebuilt in what is now Crystal Palace Park by 1854. Anticipating passenger demand for travel to the new venue, the London, Brighton & South Coast Railway opened a branch line from the Brighton Main Line at Sydenham, terminating at the new Crystal Palace low level station, south of the palace and opening on the same day. The rival London, Chatham & Dover Railway began building its own line to the venue, which opened in August 1865 with services from Ludgate Hill, branching at Peckham Rye and terminating at Crystal Palace high level station, situated to the north of the palace.

Initially this line had no intermediate stations but additional stops were added within a few months, including Honor Oak, which opened to passengers on 1 December 1865. The area was sparsely populated at the time, but was built to serve the Camberwell Old Cemetery situated across Wood Vale as well as a new housing development to the south. The goods yard, used to store coal, was added at to the station after 1870.

The station was closed from 1 January 1917 to 1 March 1919 in the wartime economy measures, and again from 22 May 1944 to 4 March 1946. It was electrified in 1925, using the direct-current third rail system at 600 volts, but passenger numbers declined after the Crystal Palace burnt down in 1936. Upon the line reopening in 1946 with the cost of repairing the war damage and declining passenger numbers the decision was taken to close the branch in 1954. The station was demolished around 1956–7.

No trace of the station remains and the site is occupied by housing. The nearby Honor Oak Park station, on the Brighton Main Line, proved more popular with passengers and remains open as of 2020.

Preceding station	Disused railways	Following station
Nunhead; Line closed, station open	British Railways; Crystal Palace branch	Lordship Lane; Line and station closed
