= Upper Sydenham railway station =

Former railway station in England

Upper Sydenham
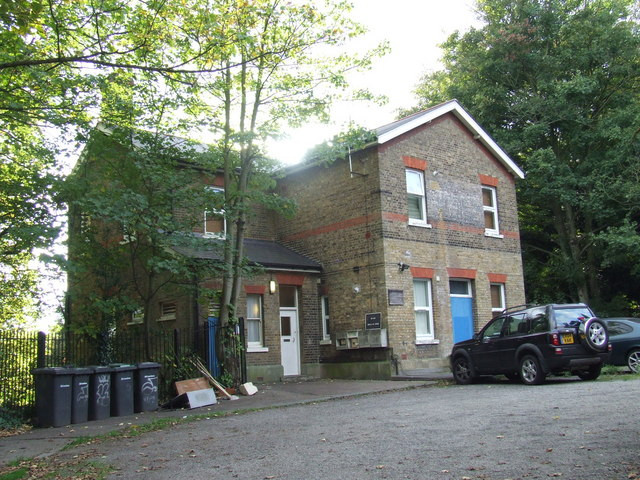
- Former booking office in 2010.

General information
- Location: Sydenham, Sydenham; England
- Coordinates: 51.43139°N 0.07056°W
- Grid reference: TQ343719
- Platforms: 2

Other information
- Status: Disused

History
- Original company: London, Chatham and Dover Railway
- Pre-grouping: South Eastern and Chatham Railway
- Post-grouping: Southern Railway; British Railways

Key dates
- 1 August 1884: Opened
- 1 January 1917: closed
- 1 March 1919: reopened
- 22 May 1944: closed
- 4 March 1946: reopened
- 20 September 1954: Station closed to passengers
Location

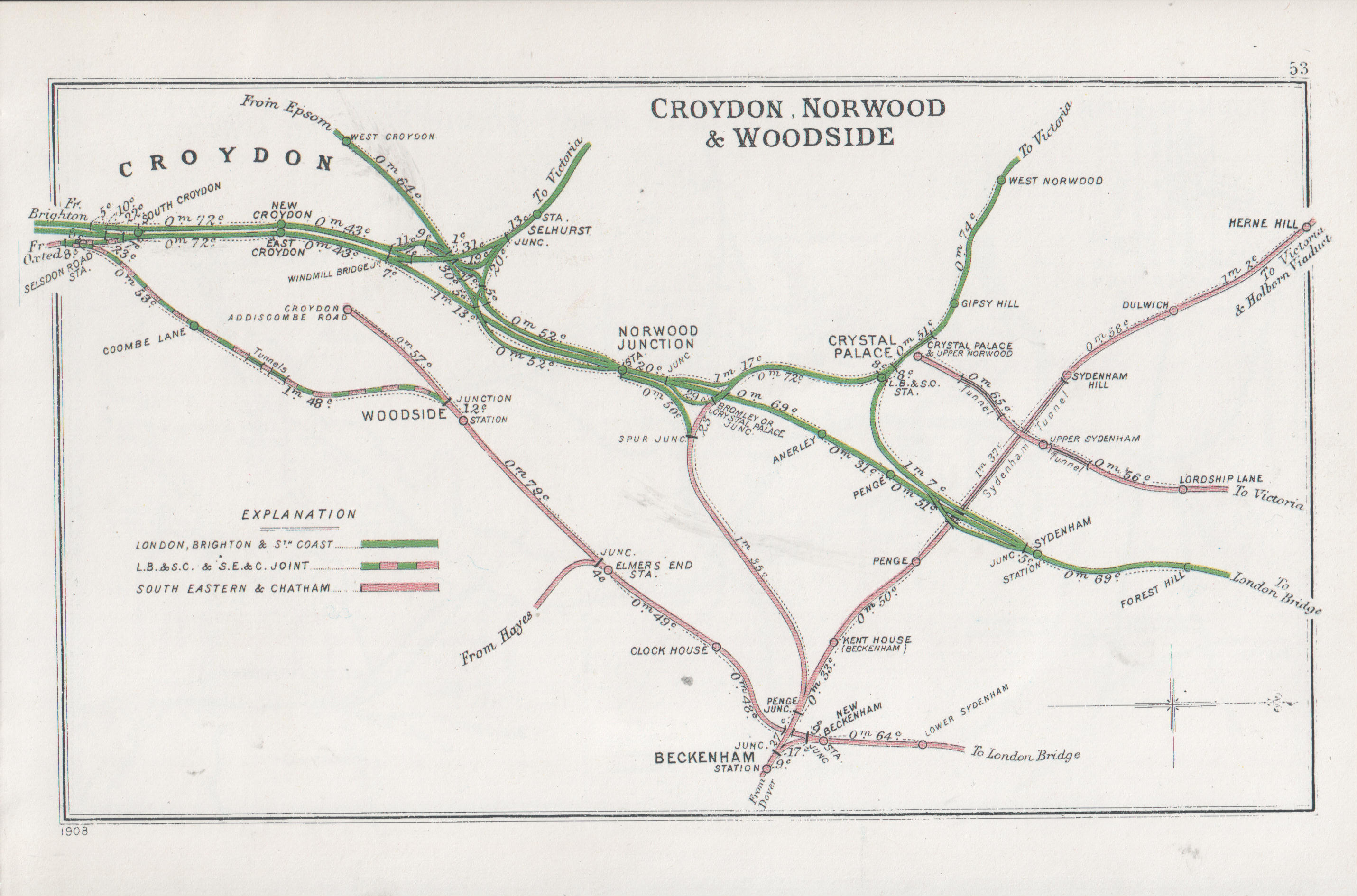
A 1908 Railway Clearing House map of lines around the Brighton Main Line in South London, showing surrounding lines, including the Crystal Palace and South London Junction Railway.

The Crystal Palace and South London Junction Railway was authorised to build a line from Peckham Rye railway station to a terminus at Crystal Palace in 1862, in order to serve the attraction of the Crystal Palace.

== History ==
The station was opened by the London, Chatham and Dover Railway on 1 August 1884. It was temporarily closed from 1 January 1917 until 1 March 1919, and again between 22 May 1944 and 4 March 1946. Permanent closure occurred on 20 September 1954.

Upper Sydenham station was the penultimate station on the route before Crystal Palace, sitting in the wooded area at the top of Sydenham Hill, overlooking Dulwich and Sydenham. The station and the line were poorly used despite new houses being built in the area as passengers preferred to use other stations near-by (Sydenham Hill, Crystal Palace (Lower Level) and Sydenham) which were on more direct routes. The line was one of the first of the former South Eastern and Chatham Railway to be electrified by Southern Railway, under "South Eastern Electrification - Stage 1" in July 1925. The destruction of the Crystal Palace in 1936 saw patronage reduced.

During the Second World War the branch line suffered damage from enemy action. After the war the cost of repairing the war damage with declining receipts led to the decision to close the line on 20 September 1954, the first permanent closure of a Southern Electric line. The dismantling of the station took place in 1957.

== Current ==
Today all that remains of Upper Sydenham Station is the booking office and station house, which is now a private residence on Wells Park Road, the railway tunnel which is now blocked off but intact and a few muddy hints of where the line and platform once ran. It is thought that the station platforms were buried when the area was landscaped. The station's location sits in Hillcrest Woods, providing a popular local footpath.

Preceding station	Disused railways	Following station
Lordship Lane	British Railways; Southern Region; Crystal Palace and South London Junction Railway	Crystal Palace (High Level)
