= Crystal Palace and South London Junction Railway =

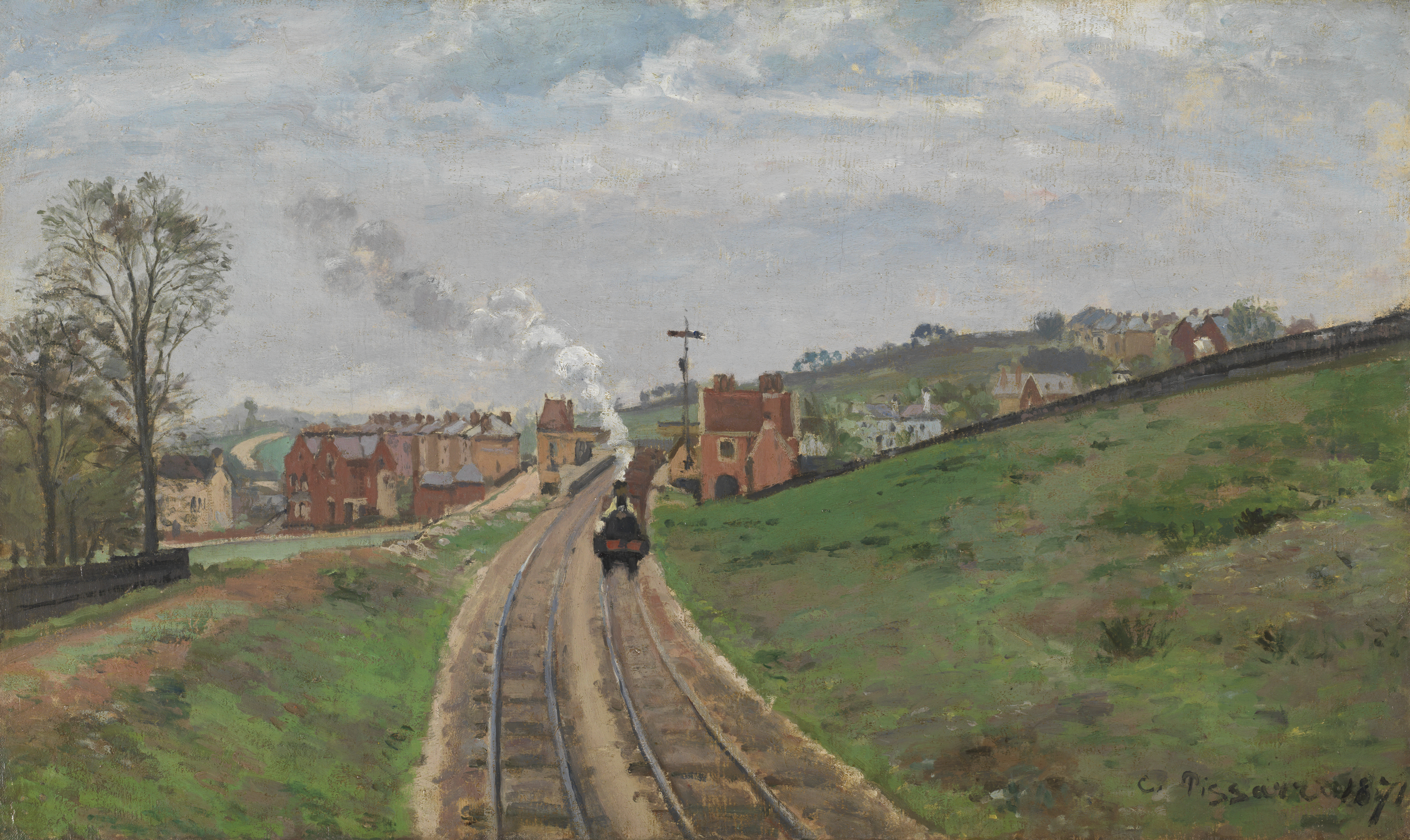
- Lordship Lane Station, an intermediate station on the Crystal Palace and South London Junction Railway, by Camille Pissarro (1871).

Overview
- Status: Closed
- Locale: Greater London

Service
- Type: Commuter rail
- Operator: British Railways Southern Region

History
- Opened: 1865
- Closed: 1954

Technical
- Number of tracks: 2
- Track gauge: 4 ft 8 1/2 in (1,435 mm)

The Crystal Palace and South London Junction Railway (CPSLJR) was built by the London, Chatham and Dover Railway (LCDR) from Brixton to Crystal Palace High Level to serve the Crystal Palace after the building was moved to the area that became known as Crystal Palace (otherwise "Upper Norwood") from its original site in Hyde Park.

== History ==
=== Origins ===
The Great Exhibition closed in 1851, leaving the Crystal Palace building in Hyde Park redundant. Rather than simply being demolished, between 1852 and 1854 it was rebuilt in a pleasure park at Sydenham Hill as an "events" venue, creating a potential demand for lucrative leisure travel.

The London Brighton and South Coast Railway (LBSCR) was the first to exploit this by running a spur up from Sydenham to a new station next to the park, opening in 1854. In 1856 the West End of London and Crystal Palace Railway (WELCPR) arrived with a line through its own platforms next to the LBSCR station, and on to Norwood Junction. In 1858 this was extended east via Beckenham Junction to "Bromley" (Shortlands) on the LCDR mainline, and in 1860 west to Victoria.

The WELCPR thus became the LCDR's principal route to central London, and provided good access to the new Crystal Palace site. But it was operated by, and later leased to, the LBSCR, which inevitably led to operational friction. The LCDR needed an independent mainline to the West End and City, and its own Crystal Palace station. In 1863 it opened the new mainline from Beckenham Junction to Victoria via Brixton, with a branch to the city from Herne Hill.

Despite their rivalry elsewhere, the LCDR and LBSCR collaborated to build the South London Line from Brixton as far as Peckham Rye. The LCDR lines were extended east from Peckham as far as Nunhead then south to Upper Norwood under the auspices of the CPSLJR, an LCDR-promoted independent company. The branch and its terminus, the new Crystal Palace (High Level) station, opened in 1865, 11 years after the re-siting of the Crystal Palace.

=== Operation ===
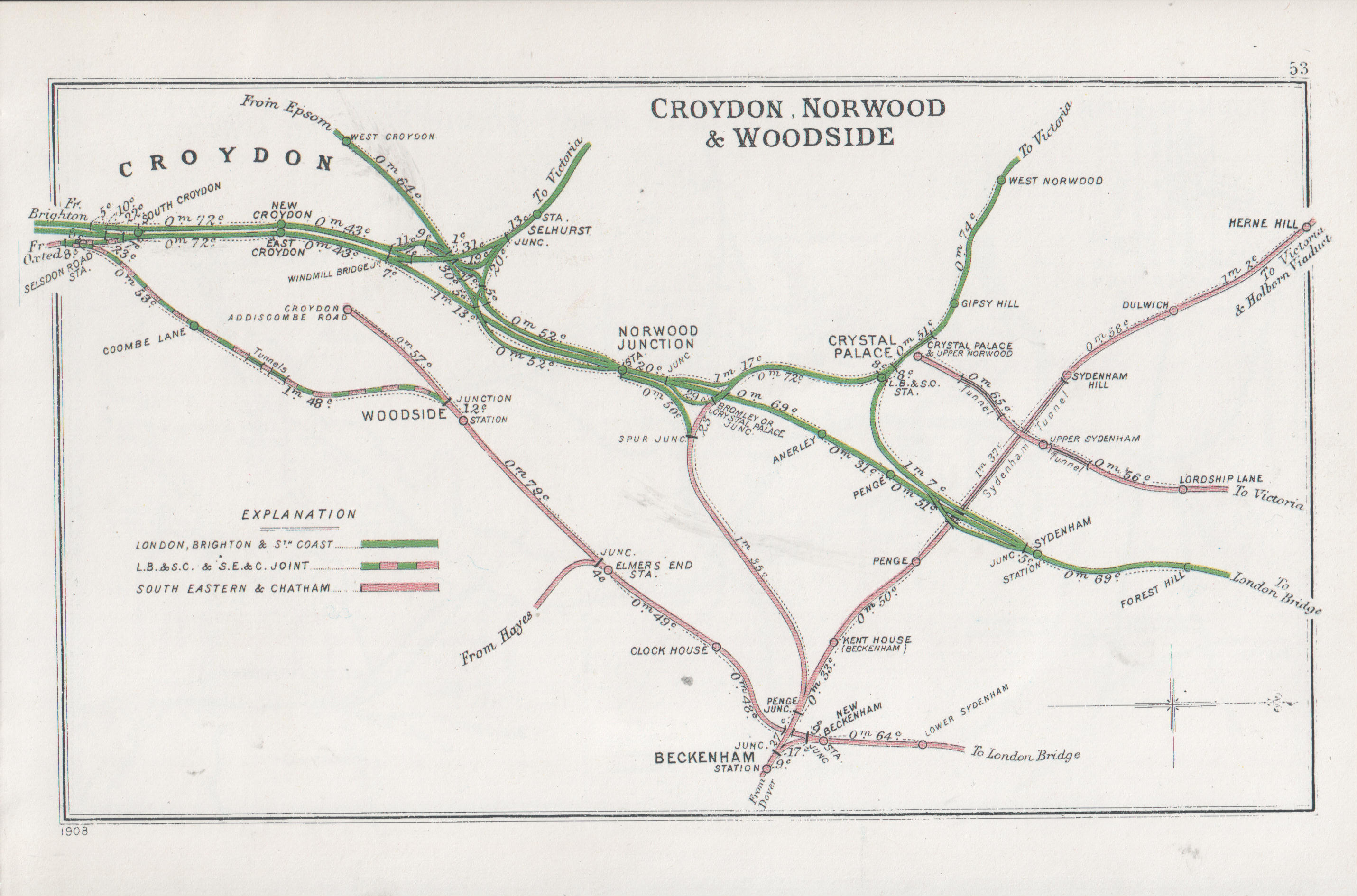
A 1908 Railway Clearing House map of lines around the Brighton Main Line in South London, showing surrounding lines, including the Crystal Palace and South London Junction Railway.

The branch line had a chequered history, linked to the Crystal Palace's own precarious financial position, with two periods of closure. Wartime economies led to the line closing from 1917 to 1919. After this first closure, trains from Holborn Viaduct railway station in the city were not reinstated. However, the branch was electrified, as part of a Southern Railway scheme, on 12 July 1925. After electrification all trains operated to Blackfriars and Holborn Viaduct.

Following the destruction of the Crystal Palace by fire in 1936, the line lost most of its original function of carrying visitors to events in the Palace. Manpower shortages led to a second closure from 1944 to 1946. When services were reintroduced they were very lightly used, and the line finally closed on 20 September 1954. The track was lifted in 1956. The northern part remains in use as part of the former Greenwich Park branch line and the Catford Loop Line

Lordship Lane station was the subject of one of Camille Pissarro's small-scale pictures.

Although much of the route of the railway has now been lost to residential development, it can be traced in places. Architectural features remain such as the ornamental portal of the Paxton Tunnel just north of the terminus. Part of the route adjacent to the Horniman Museum and Gardens is now a 'Railway Nature Trail', maintained for the museum by the Trust for Urban Ecology. The section between Cox's Walk footbridge and northern entrance to the Crescent Wood tunnel is managed by the London Wildlife Trust as the Sydenham Hill Wood nature reserve. Two tunnel entrances remain at Hillcrest Wood and are known hibernation roosts for the Brown long-eared bat.

In the early 1990s, a local amenity group, Friends of the Great North Wood, produced a walking leaflet entitled From the Nun's Head to the Screaming Alice describing a route that closely follows the line. ('Screaming Alice' was Cockney rhyming slang for Crystal Palace.) The walk continues from the site of Crystal Palace High Level past the Crystal Palace Museum to the remaining Crystal Palace railway station (formerly Crystal Palace Low Level).

== Stations ==
The original line served the following stations:

- Denmark Hill
- Peckham Rye
- Nunhead
- Honor Oak (closed)
- Lordship Lane (closed)
- Upper Sydenham (closed)
- Crystal Palace High Level (closed)

Crystal Palace High Level was in competition with Crystal Palace Low Level station for passenger traffic to the Crystal Palace.
