= Honor Oak =

Area of London, England

Coordinates: 51.4506°N 0.0516°W

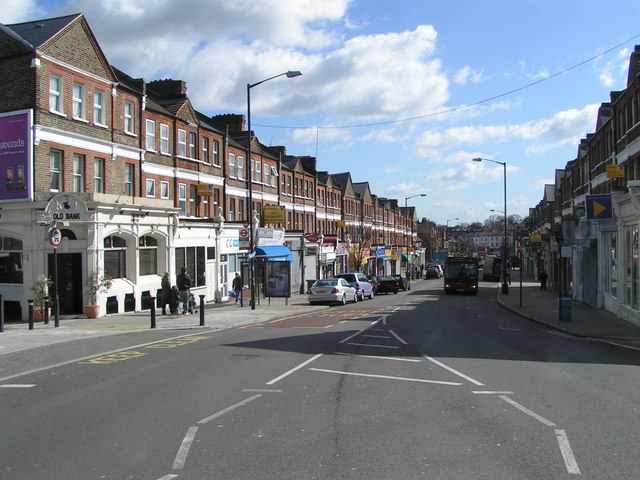
- Shops along Honor Oak Park

- Location within Greater London
- OS grid reference: TQ355745
  - Charing Cross: 5 mi (8.0 km) NW
- London borough: Lewisham; Southwark
- Ceremonial county: Greater London
- Region: London
- Country: England
- Sovereign state: United Kingdom
- Post town: LONDON
- Postcode district: SE23, SE22
- Dialling code: 020
- Police: Metropolitan
- Fire: London
- Ambulance: London
- London Assembly: Greenwich and Lewisham; Lambeth and Southwark

Honor Oak is an inner suburban area principally of the London Borough of Lewisham, with part in the London Borough of Southwark. It is named after the oak tree on One Tree Hill that Elizabeth I is reputed to have picnicked under.

== Overview ==
One Tree Hill is the central feature of Honor Oak's landscape. It is at the northern end of a string of hills stretching from Croydon, previously part of the Great North Wood. A legend tells that on 1 May 1602, Elizabeth I picnicked with Sir Richard Bulkeley of Beaumaris in the Lewisham area by an oak tree at the summit of a hill. The tree came to be known as the Oak of Honor. The tree surrounded by railings is an oak, and was planted in 1905 as a successor to the historic one. In addition to its connection with Queen Elizabeth I, the hill is reputedly the site of the final defeat of Queen Boudica by the Romans in 61AD, while Dick Turpin allegedly used it as a lookout post.

A new development of exclusive houses was started in the 1780s on what is now Honor Oak Road. This gave rise to both Honor Oak and Forest Hill, London communities. These localities have drifted about a mile apart North and South respectively since, aided by the arrival of a canal and then railways.

Between 1809 and 1836, a canal ran through Honor Oak as part of its route from New Cross to Croydon. It also went via Forest Hill and Sydenham. The canal was replaced by a railway line after 1836, and this now forms part of the line between London Bridge and Croydon. Honor Oak Park railway station opened in 1886 on this line. Honor Oak railway station was opened in 1862 but closed in 1958 as part of the closure of the Crystal Palace and South London Junction Railway, originally built to take passengers to The Crystal Palace. The remains of the embankment of this line can still be seen, forming part of Brenchley Gardens.

The beacon at the summit of One Tree Hill was erected to commemorate the Silver Jubilee of King George V in 1935. It was subsequently used for the Coronation of Queen Elizabeth II, her silver and golden jubilees and also at the Millennium. Beacons on the same site were used to give warning of invasion by the Spanish and later the French. The Hill was also the site of Watson's General Telegraph, a relay system established in 1841 linking London with shipping in the English Channel

Honor Oak & Forest Hill Golf Club (now defunct) was founded in 1893. The club disappeared at the time of WW2. This area is now Camberwell New Cemetery.

In 1896, One Tree Hill was due to become part of a golf club, but there were riots and demonstrations by local people. This fell through, and later it was bought by Metropolitan Borough of Camberwell and made into a public open space by 1905.

During World War I a gun emplacement was erected on the hill to counter the threat of raids by Zeppelin airships.

One part of the open space eventually became a nine-hole golf course called the Aquarius Golf Club. It lies on top of the cavernous Honor Oak Reservoir, constructed between 1901 and 1909. When it was completed the reservoir was the largest brick built underground reservoir in the world and even today remains one of the largest in Europe. The reservoir now forms part of the Southern extension of the Thames Water Ring Main.

The southern road bridge, which crosses the railway by the station, has relief sculpture parapets which were one of the first commissions for William Mitchell.

In 2010 Honor Oak Park railway station became part of the London Overground extension, providing residents with direct links into Shoreditch and Highbury and Islington. As with neighbouring Forest Hill, Honor Oak is becoming increasingly desirable as a peaceful, leafy suburb with good transport links into the centre of town, and slightly lower-than-average property prices. The station is today part of the network's Windrush line.

The Architect Walter Segal worked with Lewisham council in the 1980s in 2 self build schemes in the area, phase 2 is Walters Way (phase 1 Segal Close is a little further away towards Catford). Buildings are featured in this website Celebration of Walter Segal buildings.

== Amenities and entertainment ==
Honor Oak enjoys a number of well regarded restaurants, cafes, and pubs.

These include the Babur Gourmet Indian Restaurant, described as "one of the best Indian restaurants in London" by The Independent newspaper, the Sardinian restaurant, Le Querce, Amrutha, a vegan restaurant, and a sourdough pizza restaurant, Miss Margherita.

The high street has four cafes: The Oak Cafe, Two Spoons, (which also opens as a cocktail bar in the evening), Early Hours (which is also a florist) and Daydreamer.

Local public houses are The Chandos, The General Napier, The Honor Oak and The Brockley Jack.

On the eastern side of One Tree Hill is a large allotment site called "One Tree Hill Allotment Society", with views over towards Lewisham and Bromley. The site having over 100 plots and fairly long waiting list. Popular Open Day in September and occasional other public events.

== Notable residents ==
Sir John Cowan (1774–1842), chandler and Lord Mayor of London (1837–1838), lived on Honor Oak Road. In the year of her accession 1837, Queen Victoria visited the City of London; he received a baronetcy in recognition of the hospitality she was shown.

Irish-born political activist Jim Connell (1852–1929), author of The Red Flag, lived at 22a Stondon Park (which is on the border of Crofton Park and Honor Oak) from 1915 to 1929. He wrote the anthem while on a train journey to his home in New Cross in December 1889.

Engineer and astronomer Edwin Clark (1814–1894) lived at Observatory House on the corner of Honor Oak Park and Honor Oak Road from 1857 to 1879. He is principally known for his hydraulic boat lifts. Robert Stephenson left him money in his will which he used to build a telescope on his house. Only the gates survive now.

Poet Walter de la Mare lived at what is now 61 Bovill Road from 1877–c.1887.

Leslie Paul (1905–1985), founder of the Woodcraft Folk and author of Angry Young Man, lived on Bovill Road.

Footballers Ian Wright and David Rocastle both grew up in the area, living on the Honor Oak Estate.

The comedian Spike Milligan (1918–2002) lived at 22 Gabriel Street and 50 Riseldine Road after coming to England from India in the 1930s.

Desmond Dekker (1941–2006) lived at flat 4, Dunoon Gardens, Devonshire Road in the 1980s and 1990s.

Other famous residents have included include actor Timothy Spall and singer Gabrielle.
