= Lordship Lane railway station =

Former railway station in England

Lordship Lane
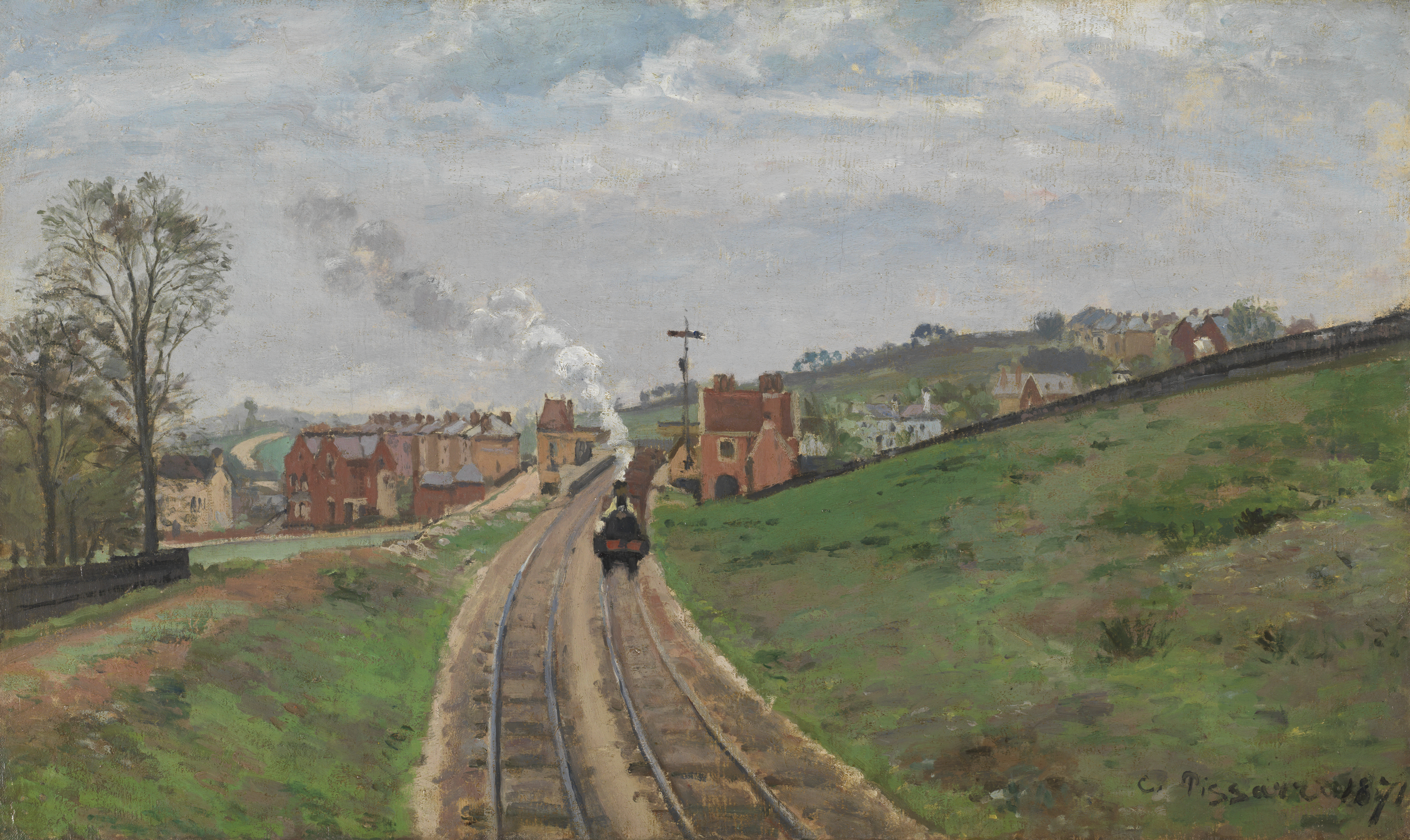
- Lordship Lane Station, Dulwich, by Camille Pissarro (1871)
- Interactive map of Lordship Lane

General information
- Location: East Dulwich
- Local authority: Metropolitan Borough of Camberwell
- Number of platforms: 2

Railway companies
- Original company: London, Chatham and Dover Railway
- Pre-grouping: South Eastern and Chatham Railway
- Post-grouping: Southern Railway; British Railways

Key dates
- 1 September 1865: Opened
- 1 January 1917: closed
- 1 March 1919: reopened
- 22 May 1944: closed
- 4 March 1946: reopened
- 20 September 1954: Closed

Other information
- Coordinates: 51.4403°N 0.0653°W

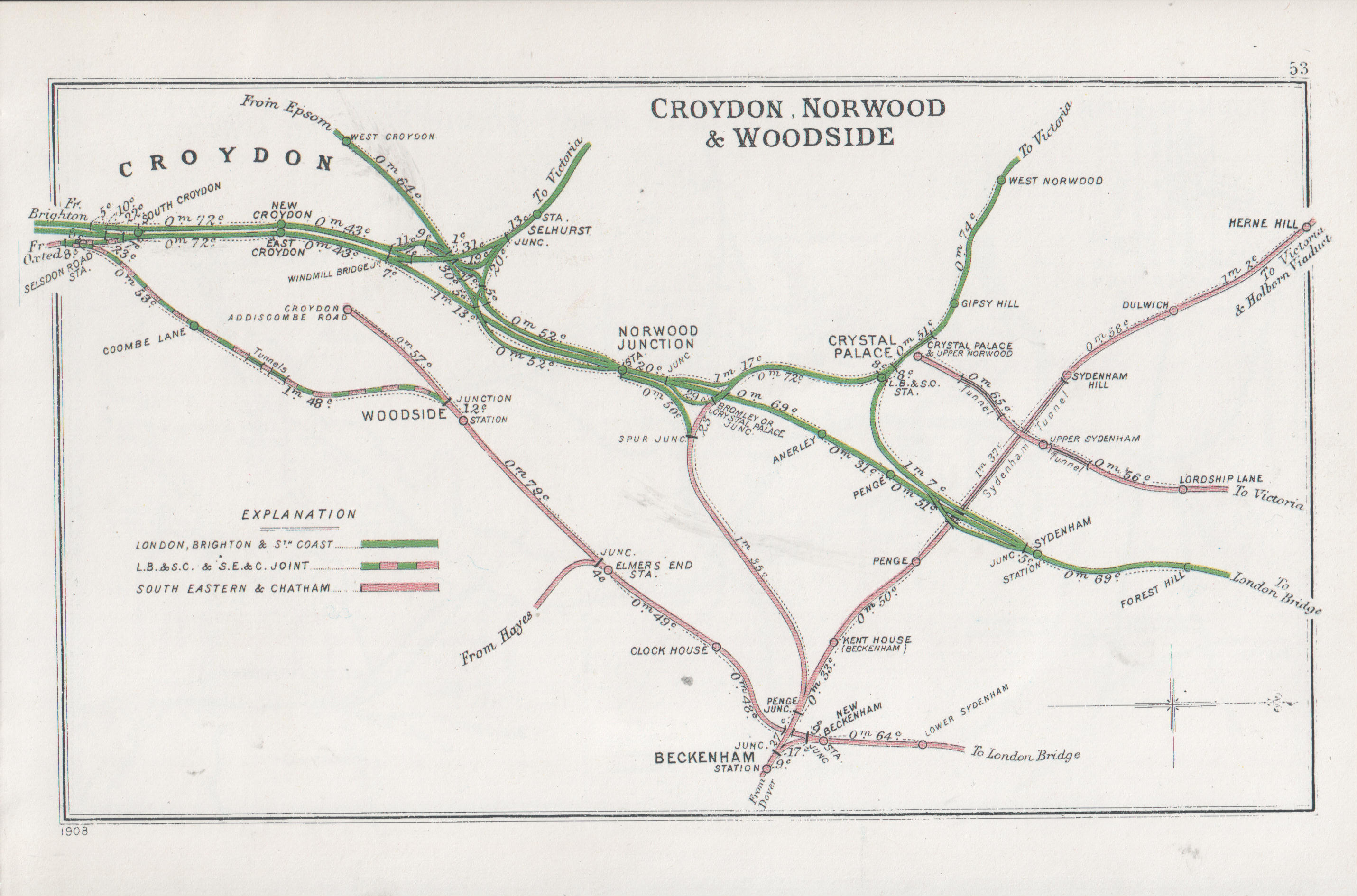
A 1908 Railway Clearing House map of lines around the Brighton Main Line in south London, showing surrounding lines, including the Crystal Palace and South London Junction Railway.

Lordship Lane was a railway station in East Dulwich, in what was the Metropolitan Borough of Camberwell in south London, on the Crystal Palace and South London Junction Railway. It was opened by the London, Chatham and Dover Railway (LCDR) on 1 September 1865 and took its name from Lordship Lane, the thoroughfare on which it stood.

In 1925 the line, now part of the Southern Railway, was electrified and the platform extended to allow for the new electric trains. At this time the signal box also closed.

It was situated a short distance from a rival London, Brighton and South Coast Railway (LBSCR) station named Forest Hill, which survives. The land was owned by the Dulwich Estate. and is near the Horniman Museum. The Dulwich Estate required higher architectural standards than elsewhere on the line. The road bridge was "elaborately ornamented" and the station building had two gabled roofs. In 1930, even though the line was electrified, the lighting on the platform was still lit by gas.

On one day in February 1926 only 366 passengers travelled from Lordship Lane towards Crystal Palace and 401 travelled towards central London. If you look at tickets issued in 1925 there were 30,043 tickets issued, and 870 season tickets issued. In 1934 this had increased to 57,019 tickets and 1,742 season tickets.

It was closed during the First World War between January 1917 and March 1919 and again during the Second World War in May 1944 after it suffered heavy bomb damage during the Blitz. The station was repaired and temporarily reopened in March 1946.

Lordship Lane station was permanently closed, along with the rest of the line, on 20 September 1954. The railway crossed London Road (just beyond the southern end of Lordship Lane itself) on a bridge and the station was just to the southwest of the road. The station was demolished in 1957. The site is now occupied by a residential estate. Photographs from 1954 show the bridge at Cox's Walk visible at the south of the platforms. The bridge, which originally crossed the line, is still extant.

The locality is the subject of Lordship Lane Station, Dulwich, an 1871 painting by Camille Pissarro, which now hangs at the Courtauld Institute of Art in London.

== See also ==
- List of closed railway stations in London

Preceding station	Disused railways	Following station
Honor Oak	British Railways; Southern Region; Crystal Palace and South London Junction Railway	Upper Sydenham
