= Sidney =

Sidney may refer to:

== People ==
- Sidney (surname), English surname
- Sidney (given name), including a list of people and fictional characters with the given name
- Sídney (footballer, born 1963) (Sídney José Tobias), Brazilian football forward
- Sidney (footballer, born 1972) (Sidney da Silva Souza), Brazilian football defensive midfielder
- Sidney (footballer, born 1979) (Sidney Santos de Brito), Brazilian football defender

== Places ==
=== Canada ===
- Sidney, British Columbia
- Sidney, Manitoba

=== United States ===
- Sidney, Arkansas
- Sidney, Illinois
- Sidney, Indiana
- Sidney, Iowa
- Sidney, Kentucky
- Sidney, Maine
- Sidney, Missouri
- Sidney, Montana
- Sidney, Nebraska
  - Fort Sidney, a historic fort
- Sidney, New Jersey
- Sidney, New York, a town
  - Sidney (village), New York
- Sidney, Ohio
- Sidney, Texas
- Sidney, West Virginia
- Sidney, Wisconsin

== Other uses ==
- Sidney (novel), by Margaret Deland
- Sidney (film), a documentary film about actor Sidney Poitier

== See also ==
- Sydney (disambiguation)
- Sidney Township (disambiguation)
- Sidnei (disambiguation)
- Sydnee (disambiguation)
