= Syd =

Syd or SYD may refer to:

- Syd (name), including a list of people with the name
- Syd., taxonomic author abbreviation of Hans Sydow (1879–1946), German mycologist
- Sydney, New South Wales, Australia
  - IATA code for Sydney Airport, New South Wales, Australia
  - Syd the platypus, a mascot of the Sydney 2000 Olympic games
  - Sydney FC, professional soccer club
- Syd (singer), an American singer-songwriter
- National Rail station code for Sydenham railway station (London), London, England
- Stonewall Young Democrats, a young gay democratic club based out of Los Angeles, California
- Sum-of-Years' Digits, an accounting, economics, and financial depreciation method
- Saw You Drown
- Seitokai Yakuindomo, a Japanese manga and anime series by Tozen Ujiie

== See also ==
- Sydney (disambiguation)
- Sid (disambiguation)
