= Sidney Township =

Sidney Township may refer to:

== Canada ==
- Sidney Township, Hastings County, Ontario, now part of Quinte West

== United States ==
- Sidney Township, Champaign County, Illinois
- Sidney Township, Fremont County, Iowa
- Sidney Township, Montcalm County, Michigan
- Sidney Township, Towner County, North Dakota, in Towner County, North Dakota
- Sidney Township, Perkins County, South Dakota, in Perkins County, South Dakota

== See also ==
- Sidney (disambiguation)
