= London and Croydon Railway =

Railway line in England (1839–1846)

The London and Croydon Railway (L&CR) was an early railway in England. It opened in 1839 and in February 1846 merged with other railways to form the London, Brighton and South Coast Railway (LB&SCR).

== Origins ==
=== The Croydon line and other railways ===
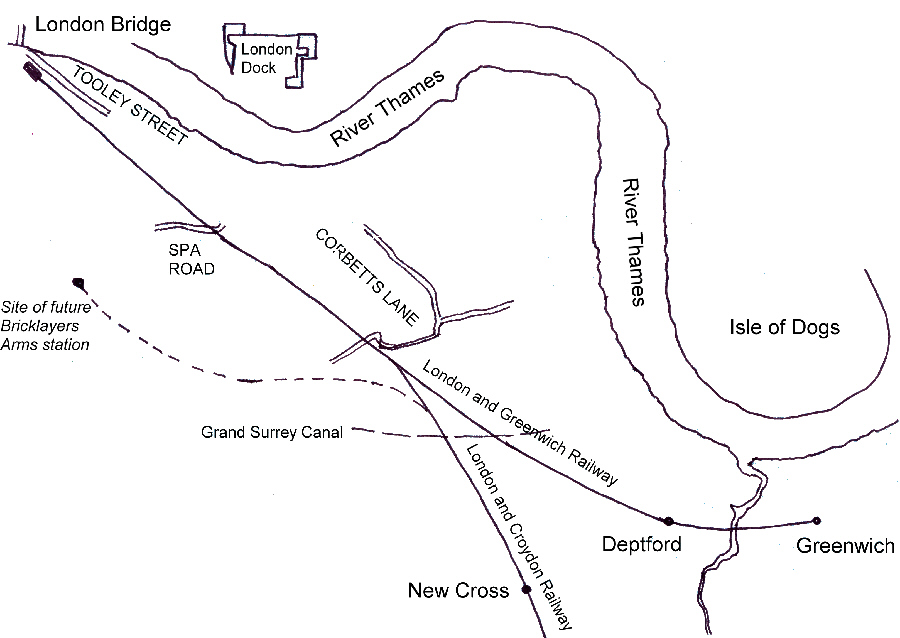
Railways in South East London in 1840

The Surrey Iron Railway had been opened in 1806 between Wandsworth and Croydon; it was a plateway operating on the toll principle, in which carriers could move wagons with their own horses. However, the Surrey Iron Railway's terminal on the Thames was rather far west and sea-going vessels were discouraged from connecting with it.

Edge railways using locomotive traction represented a clear technological advance, marked particularly by the Stockton and Darlington Railway (1825) and the Liverpool and Manchester Railway (1830), and promoters put forward a scheme to link Croydon, then an industrial town, with London. The Croydon Canal of 1809 was moribund, and it was proposed to purchase it and to utilise its course. It was to extend northwards from the Croydon Canal terminal at New Cross, so as to make a junction at Corbetts Lane (then spelt Corbets Lane), in Bermondsey with the London and Greenwich Railway; its trains were to run over that line to its London Bridge station.

The engineer Joseph Gibbs surveyed the route; this involved complex judgments, and is described below. The company obtained an authorising act of Parliament, the London and Croydon Railway Act 1835 (5 & 6 Will. 4. c. x) on 12 June 1835. (Note: Howard Turner states (page 27) that the date has often been erroneously quoted as 5 June.) The line was 8 3/4 miles (14.1 km) long and at the southern end followed the alignment of the Croydon Canal from Anerley to a terminus at Croydon, with a locomotive depot, on the site of the canal basin. This was later to be developed to the present-day West Croydon station.

London and Croydon Railway (Southwark Station) Act 1836
- Act of Parliament
- Parliament of the United Kingdom
- Long title: An Act to enable the London and Croydon Railway Company to provide a Station and other Works in the Parish of Saint Olave in the Borough of Southwark in the County of Surrey; and to amend the Act relating to the said Railway.
- Citation: 6 & 7 Will. 4. c. cxxi

Dates
- Royal assent: 14 July 1836
Other legislation
Amends	London and Croydon Railway Act 1835

Text of statute as originally enacted

The London and Greenwich Railway Company intended that its proposed London Bridge terminus would accommodate trains of several other companies and had acquired land sufficient for the purpose; at this time however it had inadequate funds to carry out the actual construction, and the Croydon company was obliged to do the work itself, taking some of the London and Greenwich Railway Company's land on the north side for the purpose, obtaining the necessary powers in the London and Croydon Railway (Southwark Station) Act 1836 on 14 July 1836. At this stage the Greenwich line had not yet been opened into London Bridge: this was completed on 1 December 1836.

The South Eastern Railway got its authorising act of Parliament, the South Eastern Railway Act 1836 (6 & 7 Will. 4. c. lxxv), on 21 June 1836 for a line from Dover, joining the London and Croydon line end-on at Croydon, and the London and Brighton Railway obtained its London and Brighton Railway Act 1837 (7 Will. 4 & 1 Vict. c. cxix) on 15 June 1837, also relying on running over the London and Croydon from Norwood. Over the following two years the point of convergence with the L&CR was varied, but all the lines converged at or before Corbett's Lane Junction. Capacity at London Bridge was clearly going to be an issue, and the L&CR took further powers (11 June 1838) to enlarge its station then under construction at London Bridge. A parliamentary select committee also became concerned about the safety of the arrangements, and in response the London and Greenwich Railway Company was given powers to widen its viaduct on the southern side so as to make a four-track viaduct from Corbett's Lane to London Bridge.

=== Determining the route ===
In its first conception, the line was to follow the bed of the Croydon Canal for much of the route. A jury determined the value of the canal as £40,250 as if it was a going concern. When detailed route design was undertaken (before handover of the canal), it was clear that the meanderings and zigzags made by the canal were unsuitable, and that the line needed to be built alongside the general course. The levels around New Cross were also difficult, and to find the best compromise a 1 in 80 gradient was selected, involving at that time the use of assistant engines due to the steepness. Even so, a cutting of considerable depth was unavoidable.

When the SER's line became authorised, the London and Croydon Railway Company reconsidered the matter, as its line would now be part of a trunk route, and it was decided to ease the gradient from New Cross to 1 in 100; this involved a deeper, and longer, cutting, and the line would only reach surface level at the present-day Forest Hill station. The deeper cuttings required more surface area of land; and some curvature improvements further south also required unanticipated land acquisition.

Stations were to be at New Cross, Dartmouth Arms (named after a nearby hostelry that is still extant in 2013), Sydenham, Penge, Annerley (later Anerley; the Scottish owner of the land said that his was the "annerley hoose" in the area), Jolly Sailor (also named after a public house just north of the current Norwood Junction). and the terminus at Croydon (now West Croydon).

Freight traffic was considered to be impracticable for handling at London Bridge, and the London freight terminal point was built at New Cross; the adjacent Surrey Canal was considered to give sufficient onward connectivity. There was also an engine shed at New Cross; coal was brought in by the canal, there being at the time no rail connection to coal mines.

== Construction ==
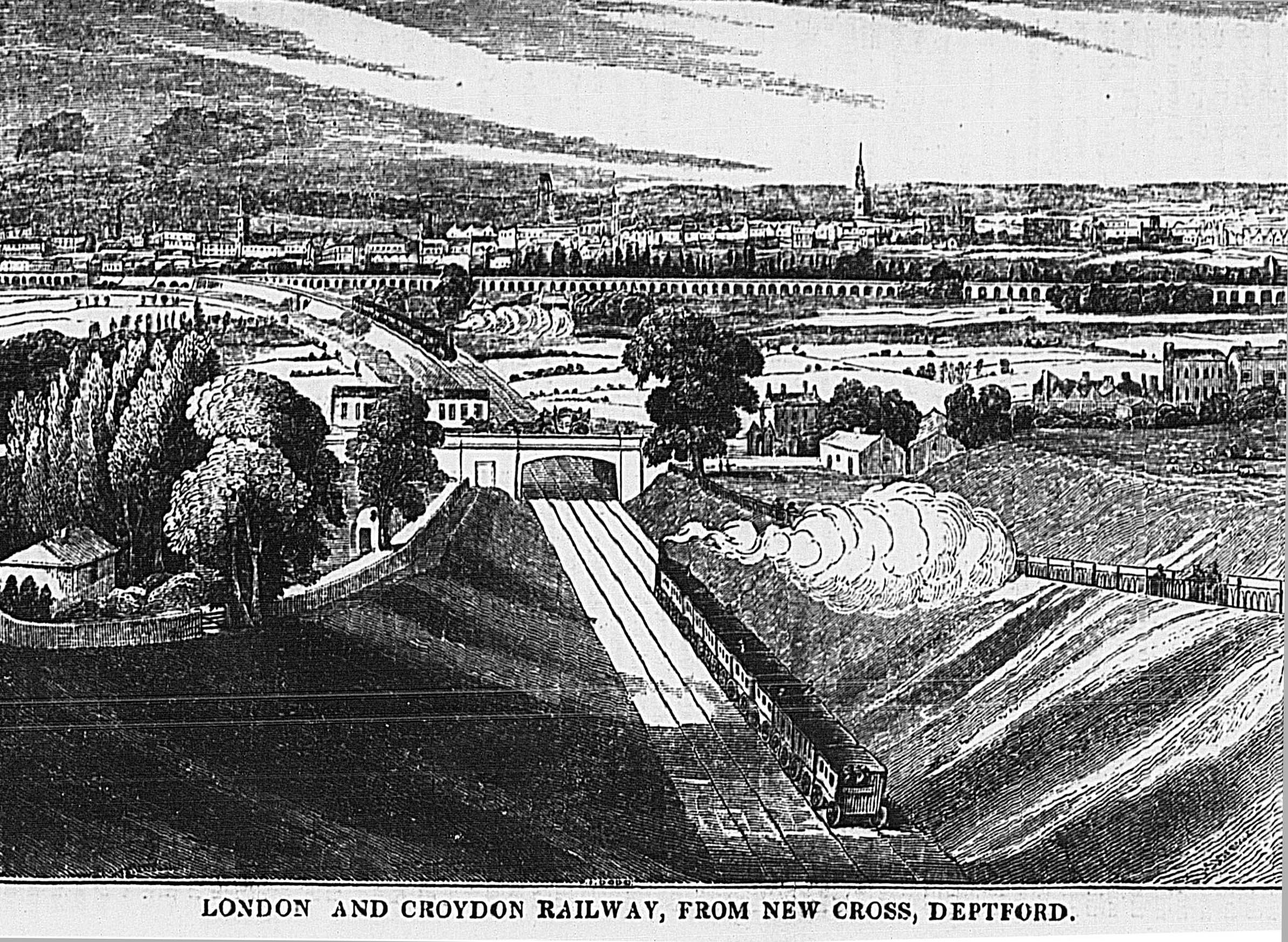
The railway at New Cross, 1839

The consultant engineer was William Cubitt. The line proved to be expensive to build, costing £615,000 rather than the estimated £180,000, due to large cuttings at New Cross and Forest Hill. The only severe gradient was 1:100 (1%) for 2 3/4 miles (4.4 km) from New Cross to Forest Hill. In addition to the viaduct where it joined the L&GR, there were 18 bridges, and three level road crossings, each attended by a "policeman".

The track was laid to standard 4 ft 8 1/2 in (1,435 mm) gauge, although during the construction the directors were undecided and ordered extra-long 9 ft (2,743 mm) sleepers with a view to conversion to 7 ft (2,134 mm) broad gauge, which never happened. The line used "Vignoles" flat bottomed rail, broader in the base and lower than modern rail. These were mounted on longitudinal timbers with cross sleepers.

A new station was built at London Bridge for Croydon trains, on the north side of the L&GR one, with track shared as far as Corbetts Lane. The line opened on 5 June 1839 There were six intermediate stations, at New Cross (now New Cross Gate), Dartmouth Arms (now Forest Hill), Sydenham, Penge, Anerley Bridge (now Anerley), and Jolly Sailor (replaced by Norwood Junction in 1859). The terminus was at London Road in Croydon.

Because of the planned additional traffic following the opening of the L&BR and the SER, the L&CR sought powers to widen the viaduct from Corbetts Lane to London Bridge in 1840. Parliament decided that the widening should be undertaken by the owners, the L&GR. This work was completed by 1842. By this time the L&CR had joined the newly opened SER and L&BR to form a committee, and agreement was reached with the L&GR to exchange their stations at London Bridge in 1843 in order to avoid their trains crossing over at Corbetts Junction.

=== Bricklayers Arms Terminus ===
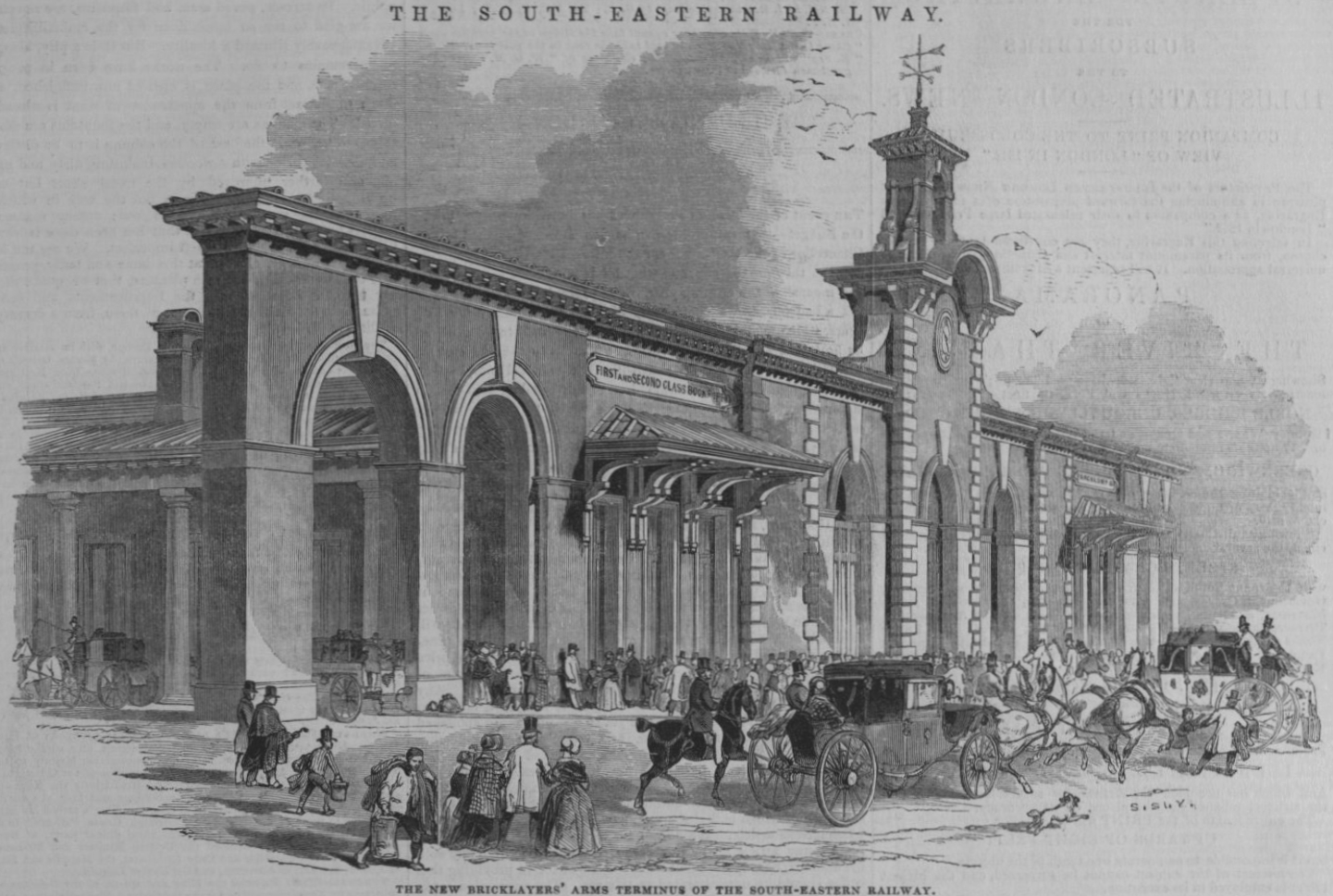
Lewis Cubitt's Bricklayers Arms station, 1844

By 1843, the L&CR and the SER were becoming concerned about the tolls charged by the L&GR for the use of its line between Corbetts Junction and London Bridge. As a result, they jointly constructed a branch from the L&CR at New Cross to a new terminus designed by Lewis Cubitt at Bricklayers Arms, thereby avoiding use of the L&GR. From 1844 the SER transferred all of its services to the new terminus, and the L&CR operated services from both termini. This arrangement lasted until 1852.

=== Epsom extension ===
In April 1844 the L&CR directors approved an extension to Epsom, not completed until after the railway became a part of the LB&SCR.

=== Deptford Dockyard extension ===
London and Croydon Railway Act 1846
- Act of Parliament
- Parliament of the United Kingdom
- Long title: An Act to enable the London and Croydon Railway Company to construct a Branch to Deptford; and for amending the Acts relating to such Railway.
- Citation: 9 & 10 Vict. c. ccxxxiv

Dates
- Royal assent: 27 July 1846

In July 1846 an act of Parliament, the London and Croydon Railway Act 1846 (9 & 10 Vict. c. ccxxxiv), was passed granting authority for a branch from New Cross to Deptford Dockyard. This was commenced after the railway became a part of the LB&SCR.

== Locomotives and rolling stock ==
The railway owned seven 2-2-2 locomotives and one 0-4-2. The first five 2-2-2s and one 0-4-2 were built by Sharp, Roberts and Company, and were delivered between July 1838 and July 1839. The remaining two were built by G. and J. Rennie, in August 1838 and May 1839.

=== Summary table ===
L&CR No.	Type	Manufacturer	Delivered	Name	Jt. Cttee No.	1845 disposal
1	2-2-2	Sharp, Roberts and Company	1838/07	Surrey	1	L&BR
2	2-2-2	G and J Rennie	1838/08	Croydon	2	SER
3	2-2-2	Sharp, Roberts and Company	1838/09	Sussex	3	L&BR
4	2-2-2	Sharp, Roberts and Company	1839/02	Kent	4	L&BR
5	2-2-2	Sharp, Roberts and Company	1839/03	London	5	SER
6	2-2-2	G and J Rennie	1839/07	Archimedes	6	SER
7	0-4-2	Sharp, Roberts and Company	1839/07	Hercules	7	SER
8	2-2-2	Sharp, Roberts and Company	1839/08	Sydenham	8	L&CR

=== Brighton, Croydon and Dover Joint Committee ===
From 1842 the L&CR pooled its locomotive stock with the SER, to form the Croydon and Dover Joint Committee. From March 1844 the L&BR joined the scheme and the locomotives were thereafter operated by the Brighton, Croydon and Dover Joint Committee, which also ordered further locomotives. These arrangements caused great operating problems for the L&CR and the L&BR and in April 1845 they gave notice of withdrawal from the arrangement in January 1846, when the locomotives were divided between the three companies. The L&CR received eight locomotives back in April 1845, seven of which had been owned by other railways.

==== Summary table ====
L&CR No.	Type	Manufacturer	Name	Jt. Cttee No.	Original Rly
17	2-2-0	William Fairbairn	-	74	L&BR
25	2-2-2	Sharp, Roberts and Company	Sydenham	8	L&CR
43	0-4-2	Sharp, Roberts and Company	Achilles	35	Jt Cttee
44	2-2-2	Sharp, Roberts and Company	Kingston	50	L&BR
48	2-2-2	Sharp, Roberts and Company	-	68	L&BR
49	2-2-2	Sharp, Roberts and Company	-	69	L&BR
50	2-2-2	Sharp, Roberts and Company	-	88	Jt Cttee
51	2-2-2	Sharp Brothers	-	90	Jt Cttee

=== Motive power depots and workshop ===
The railway opened an early example of a roundhouse motive power depot at New Cross 1 June 1839, but this brick-built building was burned down 14 October 1844. It was replaced by a nearby traditional straight shed in 1845, and the original turntable and associated lines were incorporated into a locomotive repair depot in the same year. There was also a small depot at Croydon

=== Carriage stock ===
There were first and second-class four-wheeled carriages, both of the three-compartment type usual for the period, the main difference seeming to be that the first-class coaches carried 18 passengers, the second-class 24.

== Operation ==
The line into London Bridge became increasingly congested so at Corbetts Lane a white disc was installed, to be operated by the pointsman. If the disc was face on, or a red light at night, the route was set for Croydon; edge on or a white light, the junction was set for Greenwich. It is believed that this was first fixed signal used to control a junction. Greenwich trains ran every 15 minutes, Croydon trains were hourly. The first railway semaphore signal was erected by Charles Hutton Gregory on the railway at New Cross, about 1842.

== Atmospheric railway ==
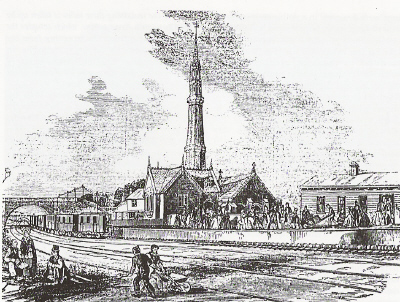
Jolly-sailor station in 1845, the atmospheric pumping station, with its Gothic chimney/exhaust vent, in the foreground.

The L&CR was given parliamentary authority in the London and Croydon Railway Act 1844 (7 & 8 Vict. c. xcvii) to lay an additional line next to the existing track and test an atmospheric railway system. Pumping stations were built at Portland Road, Croydon and Dartmouth Arms, which created a vacuum in a pipe laid between the running rails. A free-running piston in the pipe was attached to the train through a slit sealed by a leather valve. The piston, and hence the train, was propelled towards the pumping station by atmospheric pressure. The pumping stations were built in a Gothic style, with a very tall ornate tower, which served both as a chimney and as an exhaust vent for air pumped from the propulsion pipe.

As part of the construction works for the atmospheric system, the world's first railway flyover (overpass) was constructed south of Jolly Sailor, to carry the atmospheric line over the conventional steam line. The railway experienced many problems with the pumping engines and the valves during 1846, creating dissatisfaction among the shareholders with the directors. The added directors from the L&BR, after the amalgamation in August, were even less interested in continuing the experiment. In 1847, the atmospheric experiment was abandoned. The engine house at Dartmouth Arms was largely demolished in 1851 and an electricity sub-station was built on the site in 1928. Stone from the Croydon pumping station was reused in construction of the Surrey Street waterworks building, which still exists. According to one historian the use of the atmospheric system cost the railway £500,000 and was 'a sad fiasco'.

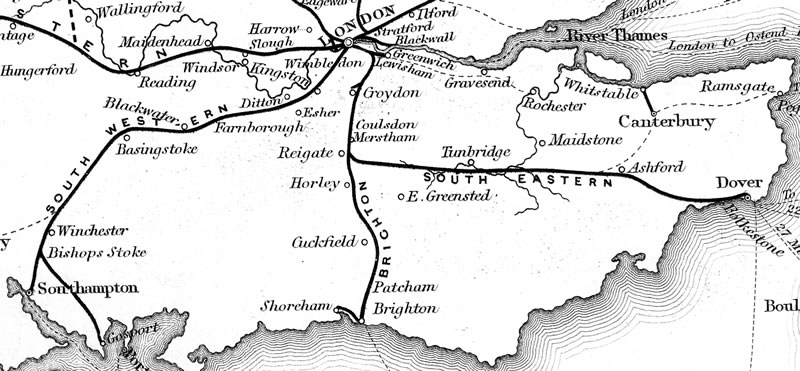
Railways in the South East of England in 1840

=== Accidents ===
The railway is not known to have suffered any serious accidents, which is remarkable given its early operation over shared lines.

== Amalgamation ==
As a result of the poor financial performance of both the L&CR and the L&BR, a group of shareholders organised an amalgamation of these companies with the Brighton and Chichester Railway and the Brighton Lewes and Hastings Railway (both under construction) to form the London, Brighton and South Coast Railway on 27 February 1846.
