= Honor Oak Park railway station =

National rail station in London, England

Honor Oak Park
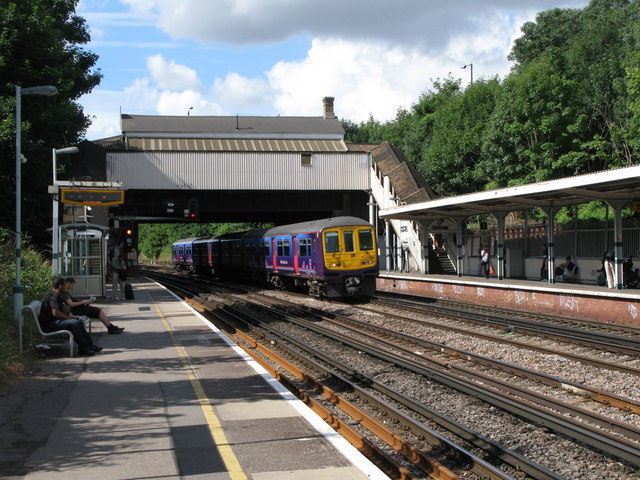
- Interactive map of Honor Oak Park

General information
- Location: Honor Oak
- Local authority: London Borough of Lewisham
- Managed by: London Overground
- Owner: Network Rail
- Station code: HPA
- DfT category: D
- Number of platforms: 2
- Tracks: 4
- Accessible: Yes
- Fare zone: 3

National Rail annual entry and exit
- 2020–21: ▼0.752 million
- 2021–22: ▲1.821 million
- 2022–23: ▲2.309 million
- 2023–24: ▲2.571 million
- 2024–25: ▼2.553 million

Key dates
- 1 April 1886: Opened

Other information
- External links: Departures; Facilities
- Coordinates: 51.4501°N 0.0456°W

Honor Oak Park (also known locally as Honor Oak) is an interchange station between the Windrush line of the London Overground and National Rail services operated by Southern, located in the suburban area of Honor Oak in the London Borough of Lewisham. It is 4 miles 59 chains (4.74 miles, 7.62 km) down the line from London Bridge, between Brockley and Forest Hill. It is located in London fare zone 3.

== History ==
The line on which it stands was opened in 1839, but this station was only opened by the London, Brighton and South Coast Railway on 1 April 1886. The housebuilders who were developing the area contributed £1,000 towards the cost of construction. There are four tracks through the station, with platforms on the outer Slow lines. These platforms are connected to the booking office (see illustration) by a footbridge. It was named to distinguish it from the Honor Oak station which existed at the time.

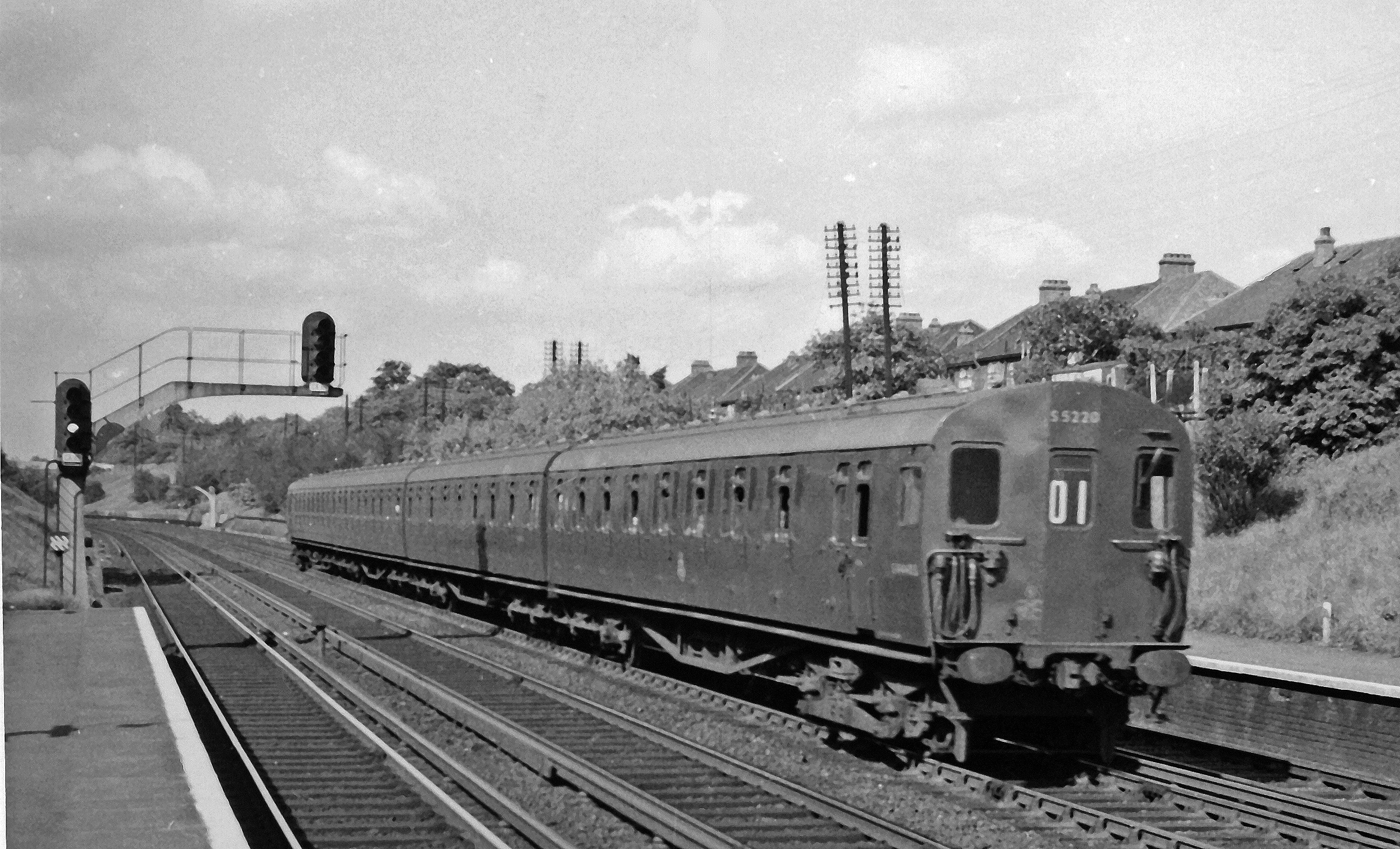
Down suburban electric train in 1958

London Overground took over operating the station in September 2009, which has benefited from the London Overground East London line extension, completed in May 2010. The East London line scheme has led to Honor Oak Park being well connected to other stations in South and East London with direct trains to Whitechapel (19 minutes), Shoreditch (23 minutes), Canada Water (10 minutes), London Victoria and London Bridge (11 minutes). Commuter areas such as Canary Wharf, Liverpool Street, Kings Cross and Waterloo are just one change of train away. From 2021 you will be able to directly interchange with Crossrail service at Whitechapel.

Despite past hopes that the Thameslink Project could provide direct trains along the Thameslink core via St Pancras International to destinations north of London, since the completion of the project in 2020, Thameslink trains have continued to run fast through the station, though with an improved interchange at London Bridge.

== Services ==
Honor Oak Park is on the Windrush line of the London Overground, with services operated using Class 378 EMUs. Additional services are operated by Southern using Class 377 EMUs.

The typical off-peak service in trains per hour is:

- 2 tph to London Bridge
- 8 tph to Highbury & Islington via Surrey Quays (Windrush line)
- 2 tph to London Victoria via Streatham Hill
- 4 tph to Crystal Palace (Windrush line)
- 4 tph to West Croydon (Windrush line)

The station is also served by a single early morning and late evening service to East Croydon via Norwood Junction, with the early morning service continuing to Tattenham Corner and Caterham.

Preceding station	National Rail	Following station
Brockley	Southern Brighton - London Victoria or London Bridge Stopping Services	Forest Hill
Preceding station	London Overground	Following station
Brockley towards Highbury & Islington	Windrush line East London line	Forest Hill towards Crystal Palace or West Croydon

== Connections ==
London Buses routes P4 and P12 serve the station.
