= Sidnei =

Sidnei is a masculine given name of Portuguese origin. People with that name include:

- Sidnei (Cape Verdean footballer) (born 1986)
- Sidnei da Silva (born 1980), Brazilian footballer
- Sidnei (footballer, born 1983), full name Sidnei Siqueira Lourenço, Brazilian football left-back
- Sidnei Sciola (born 1986), Brazilian footballer
- Sidnei (footballer, born 1989), Sidnei Rechel da Silva Júnior, Brazilian football centre-back

== See also ==
- Sidney (disambiguation)
- Sydney (disambiguation)
