= SIDS (disambiguation) =

SIDS most often refers to sudden infant death syndrome, the sudden unexplained death of a child of less than one year of age.

SIDS may also refer to:

- Screening information dataset, a study of the hazards associated with a particular chemical substance
- Small Island Developing States, a group of developing small-island countries

== See also ==
- SID (disambiguation)
