= Forest Hill railway station =

National rail station in London, England

Forest Hill
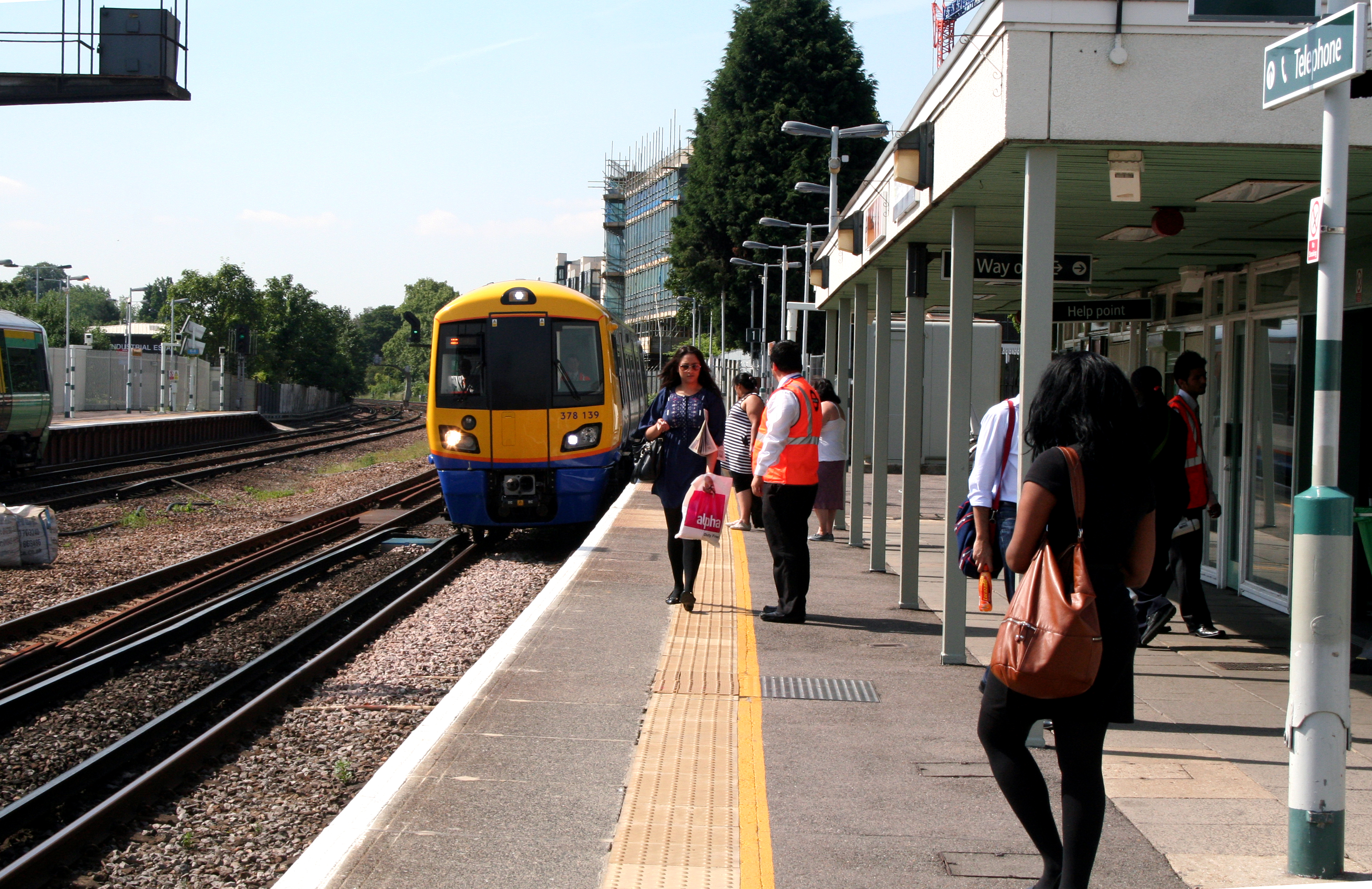
- A northbound London Overground train arrives at the station
- Interactive map of Forest Hill

General information
- Location: Forest Hill
- Local authority: London Borough of Lewisham
- Managed by: London Overground
- Owner: Network Rail
- Station code: FOH
- DfT category: C2
- Number of platforms: 2
- Tracks: 4
- Accessible: Yes
- Fare zone: 3

National Rail annual entry and exit
- 2020–21: ▼1.322 million
- 2021–22: ▲2.947 million
- 2022–23: ▲3.757 million
- 2023–24: ▲4.231 million
- 2024–25: ▼4.229 million

Key dates
- 5 June 1839: Opened as Dartmouth Arms
- 1845: Renamed Forest Hill

Other information
- External links: Departures; Facilities
- Coordinates: 51.439°N 0.053°W

Forest Hill is an interchange station between the Windrush line of the London Overground and National Rail services operated by Southern, located in Forest Hill in the London Borough of Lewisham. It is 5 miles 50 chains (5.63 miles, 9.05 km) down the line from London Bridge, between Honor Oak Park and Sydenham, in London fare zone 3.

== History ==
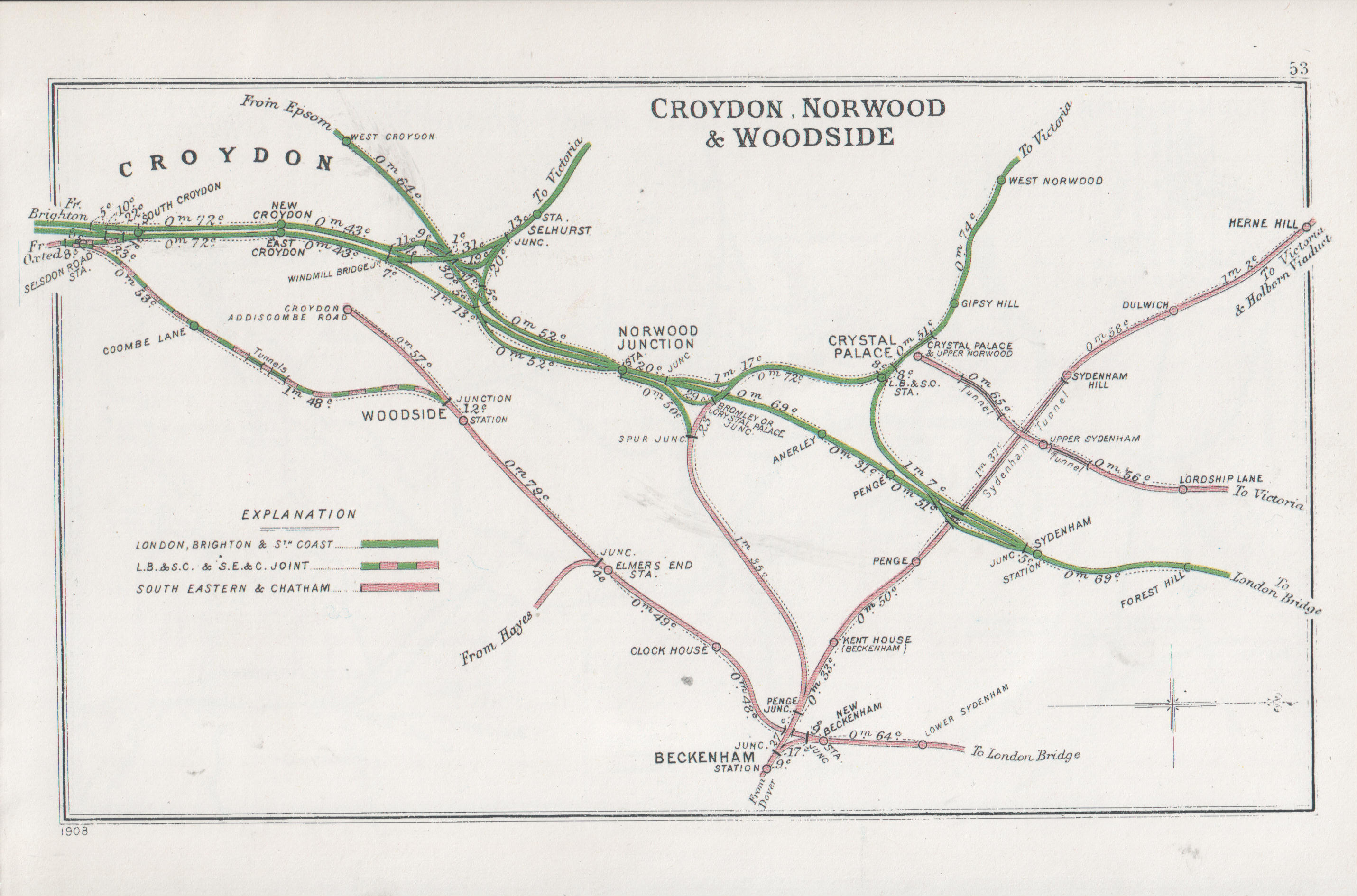
A 1908 Railway Clearing House map of lines around the Brighton Main Line between South Croydon and Selhurst/Forest Hill, as well as surrounding lines

The station was opened by the original London & Croydon Railway (L&CR) on 5 June 1839, as Dartmouth Arms (the name of the local inn).

In 1844, the station was chosen by the L&CR as the northern terminus for Phase 1 of an experimental atmospheric railway to West Croydon. A pumping station was also constructed at the station. The L&CR and the L&BR merged to form the London Brighton and South Coast Railway (LB&SCR) in July 1846; the following year "atmospheric" working was abandoned. Between 1877/78 and 1942/43, the station became Forest Hill for Lordship Lane.

The LB&SCR moved the Down platform during the early 1850s when the line was quadrupled, and extended the island platform, serving the now-through lines, around 1864. This was removed some time around the 1960s.

== Facilities ==
There are two entrances, the main one being on platform 1 at the bottom of the South Circular Road, and a side entrance on platform 2 on Perry Vale. The ticket office is placed in the main entrance, although there are ticket machines outside both entrances. There is a small car park, taxi rank, cycle spaces, a coffee kiosk on platform 1, and live departure screens.

== Passenger volume ==
Passenger Volume at Forest Hill
	2002–03	2004–05	2005–06	2006–07	2007–08	2008–09	2009–10	2010–11	2011–12	2012–13	2013–14	2014–15	2015–16	2016–17	2017–18	2018–19	2019–20	2020–21	2021–22	2022–23
Entries and exits	2,125,791	2,033,105	2,006,798	3,014,902	3,127,730	3,022,766	2,945,358	3,643,002	4,183,512	4,487,196	4,665,736	4,661,252	5,264,368	5,422,654	5,222,206	5,291,880	4,999,990	1,322,472	2,946,890	3,757,282

The statistics cover twelve month periods that start in April.

== Services ==
The typical off-peak service in trains per hour is:

- 2 tph to London Bridge
- 8 tph to Highbury & Islington via Surrey Quays (Windrush line)
- 2 tph to London Victoria via Streatham Hill
- 4 tph to Crystal Palace (Windrush line)
- 4 tph to West Croydon (Windrush line)

The station is also served by a single early morning and late evening service to East Croydon via Norwood Junction, with the early morning service continuing to Tattenham Corner and Caterham.

Preceding station	National Rail	Following station
Honor Oak Park	Southern Brighton Main Line Stopping Services	Sydenham
Preceding station	London Overground	Following station
Honor Oak Park towards Highbury & Islington	Windrush line East London line	Sydenham towards Crystal Palace or West Croydon

== Connections ==
London Buses routes 122, 176, 185, 197 and 356 serve the station.

== Bibliography ==
- Quick, Michael (2023). Railway Passenger Stations in Great Britain: A Chronology (PDF) (5th ed.). London: Railway and Canal Historical Society.
