= SID =

Sid or SID may refer to:

== People ==
- Sid (given name), includes a list of people with the name

== Science and technology ==
- Sound Interface Device: the MOS Technology 6581 sound-generating chip used in some Commodore computers
- Security Identifier, used by Microsoft
- Sid blood group system
- Saab Information Display in cars
- Slew-induced distortion, in an amplifier
- Source to image-receptor distance, in radiology
- Speed Indicator Device, a vehicle-activated illuminated sign
- Sudden ionospheric disturbance, caused by a solar flare
- Surface-induced dissociation, in mass spectrometry
- System identification number, in wireless telephony
- Source Identification codes, identifying marks on optical discs introduced by the International Federation of the Phonographic Industry
- mSin3 interaction domain, a transcriptional repressor domain
- .sid, MrSID image file extension
- Sid (Debian), the code name for the 'unstable' distribution of the operating system

== Entertainment ==
- Sid (band), a Japanese rock band
- Síd, a fairy mound in Irish folklore
- Superman Is Dead, or S.I.D., an Indonesian rock band
- Sid Vere, a fictional character from Doctors
- Sid, the given name of the Cookie Monster

== Transport ==
- Standard instrument departure, flight procedure
- Amílcar Cabral International Airport, Sal Island, Cape Verde
- Sidcup railway station (National Rail station code), London, England

== Organizations ==
- Danish General Workers' Union, former trade union in Denmark
- Security and Intelligence Division, Singapore's foreign intelligence agency
- Servizio Informazioni Difesa, the Italian military secret service 1965-1977
- Service for Research and Documentation, the Serbian intelligence agency
- Society for Information Display
- Society for International Development
- Sport-Informations-Dienst, German sports media service
- Special Investigations Division (disambiguation)

== Places ==
- Šid, Vojvodina, Serbia
- Šíd, village in Slovakia
- River Sid, in Devon, England

== Other uses ==
- Status–income disequilibrium, a political term
- Sports information director
- Self-identification or self-id
- Source Identification (SID) codes, a manufacturer identification method for optical disc production used by the International Federation of the Phonographic Industry.

== See also ==
- CID (disambiguation)
- SIDS (disambiguation)
- Syd (disambiguation)
