= Sydnee =

Sydnee may refer to:

- Sydnee McElroy, American physician and podcast host
- Sydnee Michaels (born 1988), American professional golfer
- Sydnee Steele (born 1968), American author and sex therapist
- Sydnee Washington, American comedian, actress, model, and podcaster
