= Crystal Palace (High Level) railway station =

Former railway station in South London

Crystal Palace (High Level)
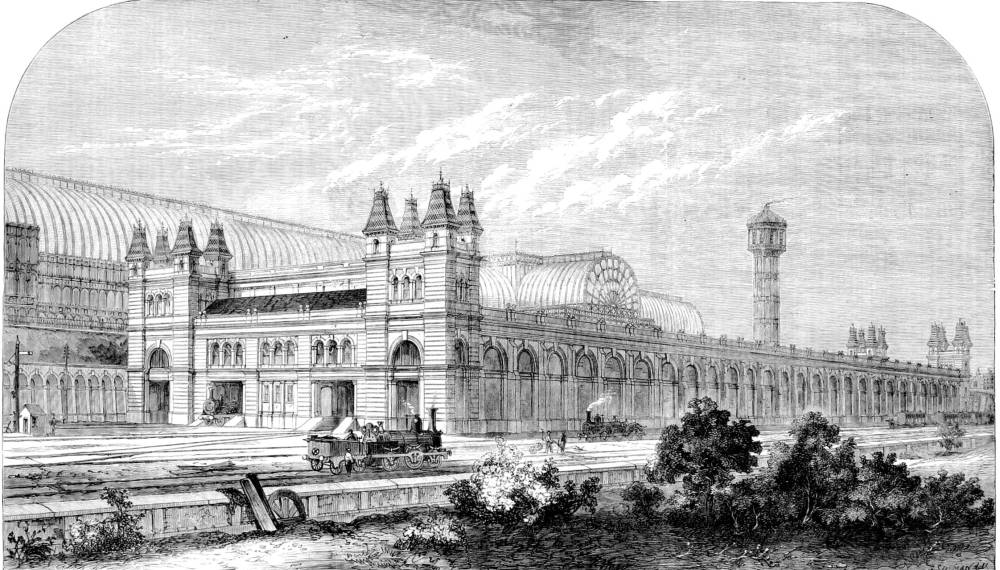

General information
- Location: Crystal Palace, Dulwich; England
- Coordinates: 51.4214°N 0.0785°W
- Grid reference: TQ337709
- Platforms: 6

Other information
- Status: Demolished

History
- Original company: Crystal Palace and South London Junction Railway
- Pre-grouping: London, Chatham and Dover Railway; South Eastern and Chatham Railway
- Post-grouping: Southern Railway; British Railways

Key dates
- 1 August 1865: Opened as Crystal Palace (High Level)
- 1 November 1898: Renamed Crystal Palace High Level and Upper Norwood
- 1 January 1917: Temporarily closed
- 1 March 1919: Reopened
- 9 July 1923: Renamed Crystal Palace High Level
- July 1925: electrified
- 22 May 1944: Temporarily closed
- 4 March 1946: Reopened
- 20 September 1954: Station closed to passengers
Location

Crystal Palace (High Level) was a railway station in South London. It was one of two stations built to serve the new site of the Great Exhibition building, the Crystal Palace, when it was moved from Hyde Park to Sydenham Hill after 1851. It was the terminus of the Crystal Palace and South London Junction Railway (CPSLJR), which was later absorbed by the London, Chatham and Dover Railway (LCDR). The station closed permanently in 1954.

The Grade II listed subway, that led to the exhibition halls, was restored in 2024 using £2.8m of grant funding; on completion, the site was expected to be removed from the Heritage at Risk Register.

== History ==
=== Origins ===
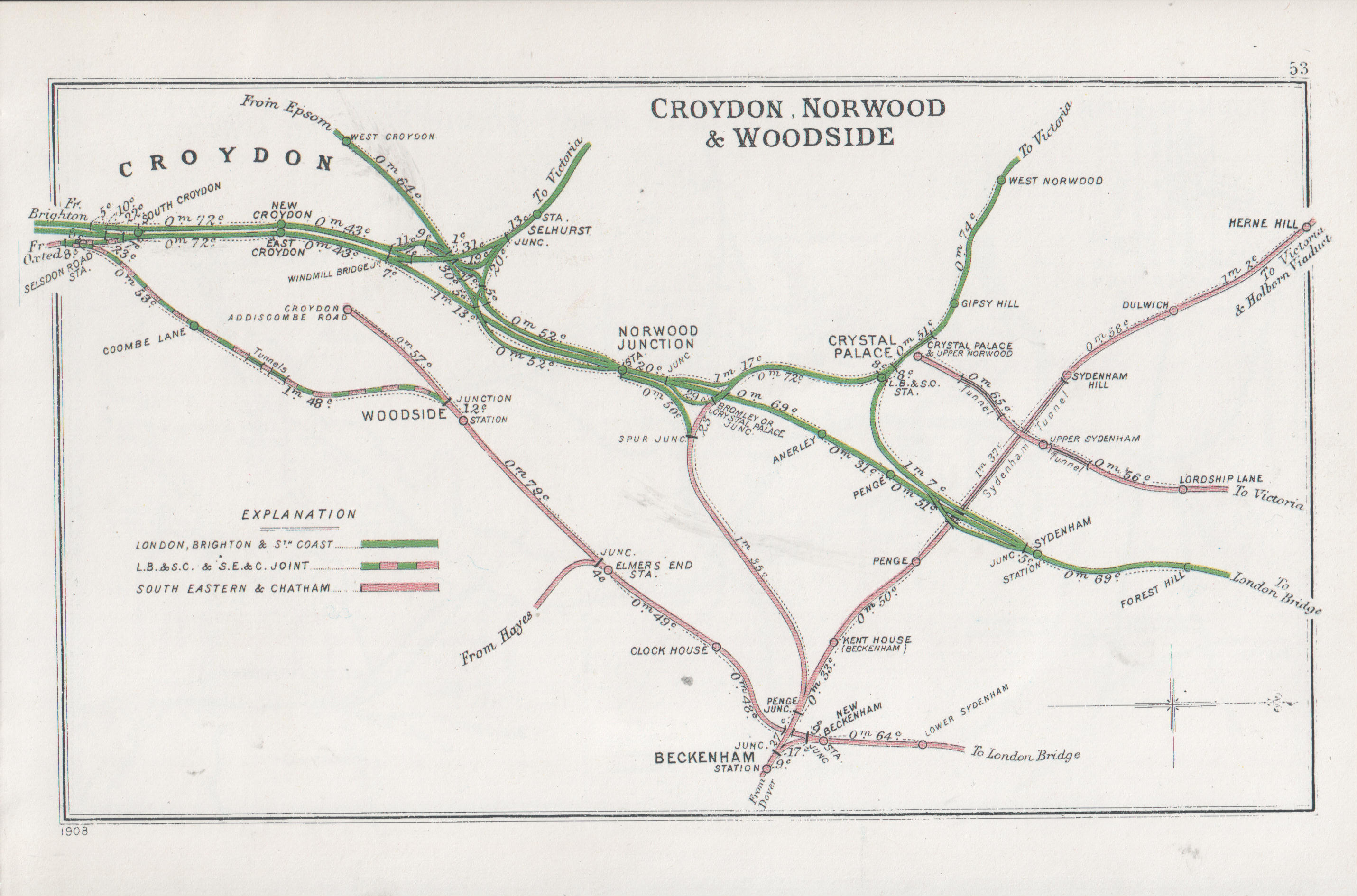
A 1908 RCH map showing Crystal Palace (High Level) station (here called Crystal Palace & Upper Norwood)

In 1860 the LCDR had a route from Beckenham Junction to Victoria via the existing Crystal Palace station (later known as "Low Level"), but this was owned and operated by the rival London, Brighton and South Coast Railway (LBSCR). To capture traffic from the LBSCR the LCDR promoted the CPSLJR to construct a branch from Peckham Rye on the South London Line via Nunhead to a new terminal station above the Crystal Palace park.

The line, and the terminus only, opened on 1 August 1865. It was on the southern boundary of the Hamlet of Dulwich division of the ancient Civil Parish of Camberwell St. Giles. (Note: Following the creation of the LCC it was in the Metropolitan Borough of Camberwell, and subsequently the London Borough of Southwark.)

=== Features ===
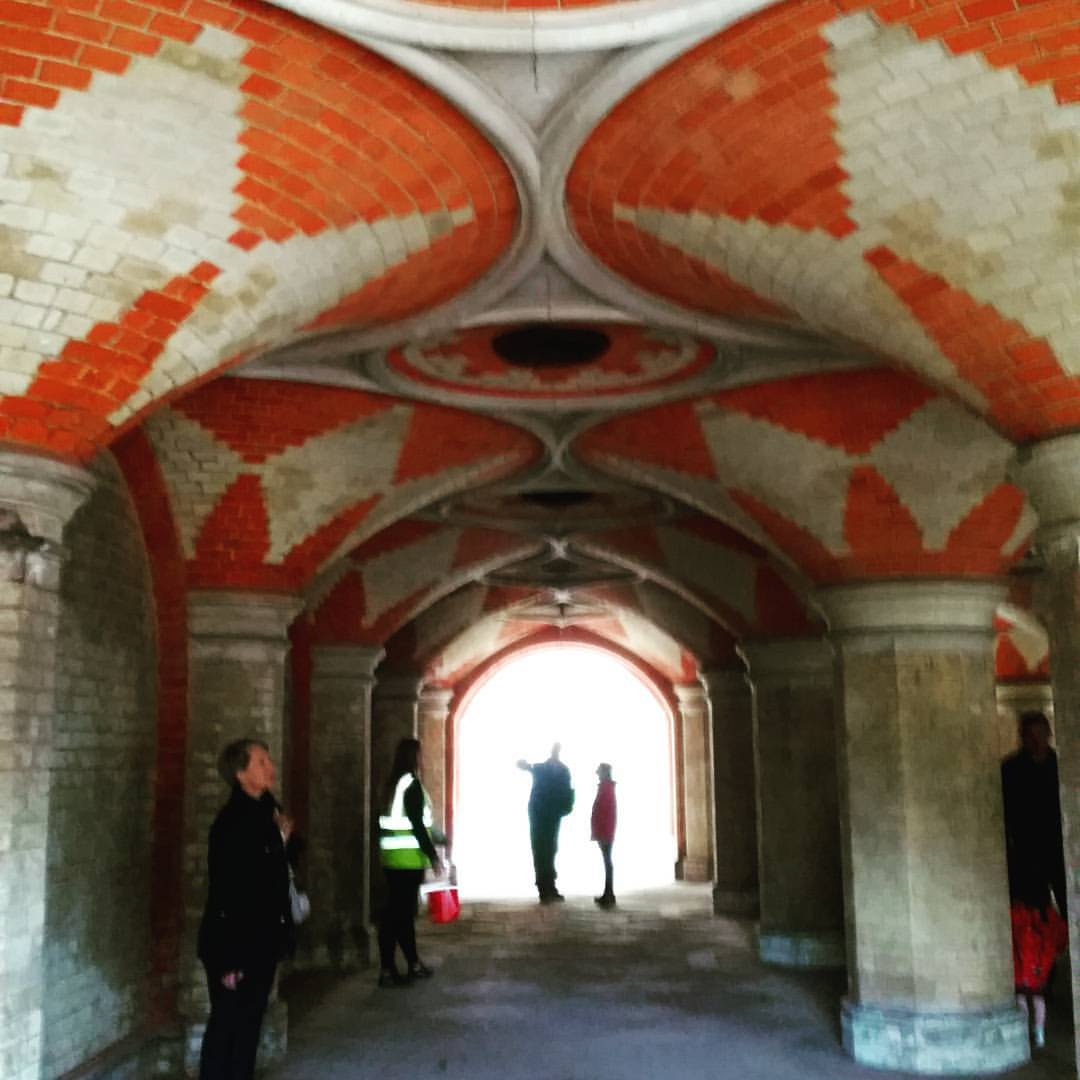
Ornate subway under road for access to site of Crystal Palace (High Level)

The station was designed by Edward Middleton Barry. as a lavish red brick and buff terra cotta building. It was excavated into the ridge below Crystal Palace Parade, approached from the north through the 439 yards (401 m) Paxton Tunnel, requiring major engineering works. There were subway exits leading under Crystal Palace Parade into Crystal Palace Park, linking the station directly with the palace. The subway was a vaulted and tiled chamber resembling a Byzantine crypt; it was designed and built by cathedral craftsmen from Italy.

The building was a fine example of High Victorian architecture with high brick side- and end-walls and a glass and iron trainshed roof. It had square towers at each corner, each topped with four short spires, and passenger concourses above the tracks at each end with booking offices, refreshment rooms and waiting rooms. One half of the station was intended for first class passengers, who were given segregated access via the subway into the central transept of the palace.

The trainshed was divided lengthways into two cavernous spaces separated by a brick-arch arcade, each side having two tracks with wooden platforms. The inner track on each side had two platform faces to support mass arrivals.

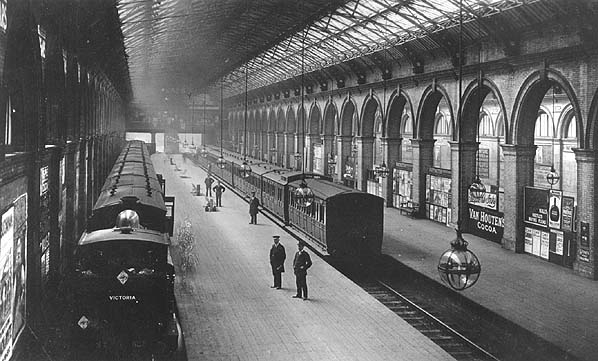
Inside the Crystal Palace High Level station in 1908

At the exit from the tunnel the two running lines fanned out into four platform tracks, with eight sidings and a long headshunt on the right and two more sidings on the left. In addition to the usual coal depot, the sidings provided stabling for spare engines and coaching stock to handle the expected surges of traffic during big events. The platform roads entered the north end of the trainshed via separate portals. At the south end, instead of a typical arrangement of buffers and engine release roads the four platform tracks passed through a second set of apertures to a turntable, allowing for fast turning of engines to run round their coaches.

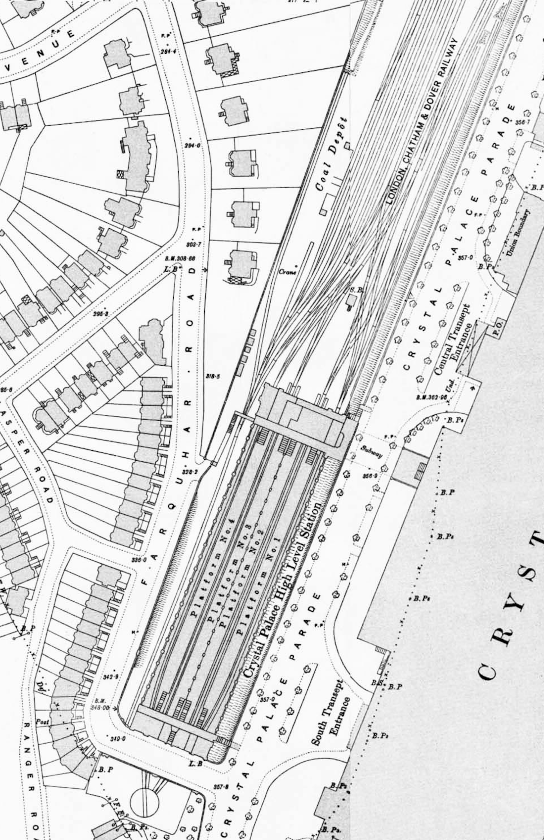
Track plan of Crystal Palace High Level in 1895

=== Decline and closure ===
The line was one of the first of the former South Eastern and Chatham Railway to be electrified by Southern Railway, under "South Eastern Electrification – Stage 1" in July 1925. But after the Crystal Palace was destroyed by fire in 1936, traffic on the branch declined. During World War II the line was temporarily closed after bomb damage. Although temporary repairs were made and the line subsequently reopened the decline in traffic and a requirement for heavy reconstruction work led to the decision to close the station with the branch on 20 September 1954, although it was not demolished until 1961.

Preceding station	Disused railways	Following station
Upper Sydenham; Line and station closed	British Railways; Southern Region; Crystal Palace and South London Junction Railway	Terminus

=== Surviving structures ===
Although the site of the station was developed for housing in the 1970s, the retaining walls below Crystal Palace Parade and the ornamental portal of Paxton Tunnel to the north are still readily visible. The brickwork fits exactly although the ground level is raised. The subway and its adjacent courtyard survived the 1936 fire and was used as an air raid shelter during World War II. It is now Grade II* listed. Although the subway is sealed off, it hosts occasional events and is sometimes opened to allow organised visits by the Friends of Crystal Palace Subway.

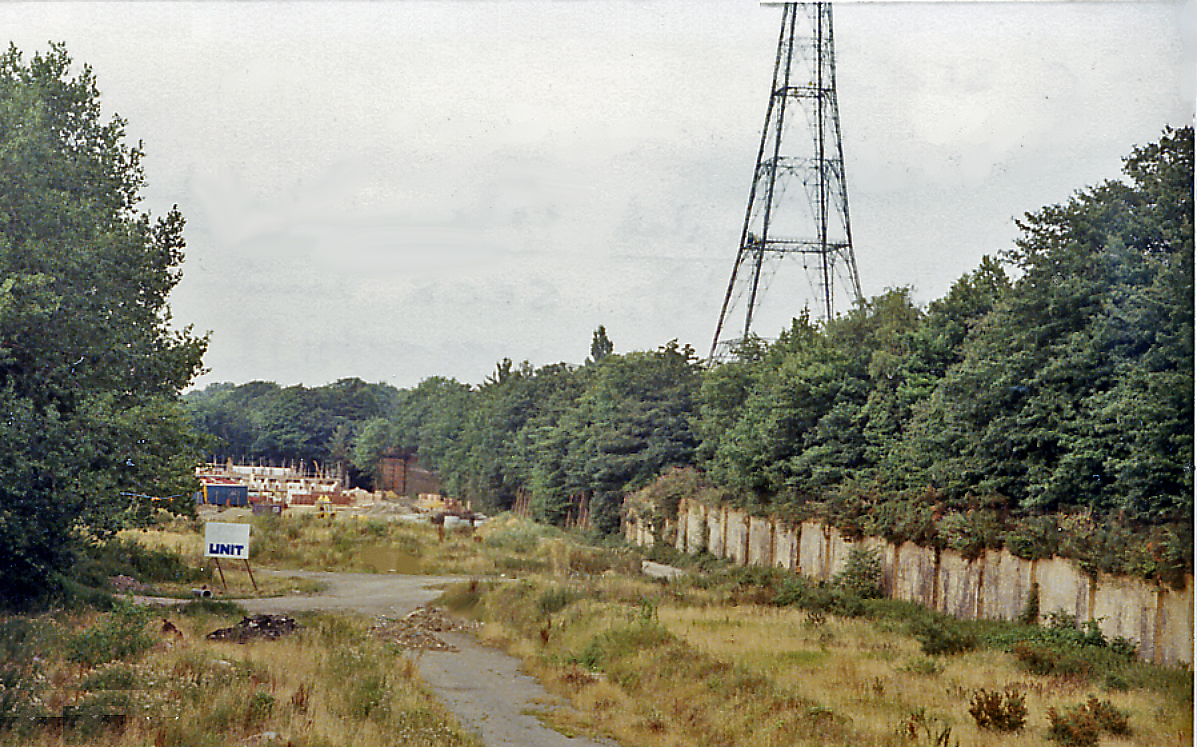
Site of Crystal Palace (High Level) station, 1983

Southwark Model Railway Club have built a scale model of the station.

== The "train entombed in the tunnel" myth ==
There is a rumour that, in one of the sealed tunnels in the area, an engine or carriage remains hidden collecting dust. Another version of the story, popular among local schoolchildren, claims that the High-Level station was closed because a commuter train was trapped by a tunnel collapse, entombing the passengers, who remain there to this day.

These stories are an example of the persistence of local urban legend. The story of the entombed train was apparently current in the 1930s. Back then it referred to the abandoned 1860s Crystal Palace pneumatic railway on the north side of the grounds of Crystal Palace Park.

Most traces of this had almost certainly been destroyed by the building works for the 1911 Festival of Empire, but there was an unsuccessful archaeological dig for the train sponsored by the BBC's Nationwide current-affairs programme in the 1970s.
