= Sydenham railway station (London) =

National rail station in London, England

Sydenham
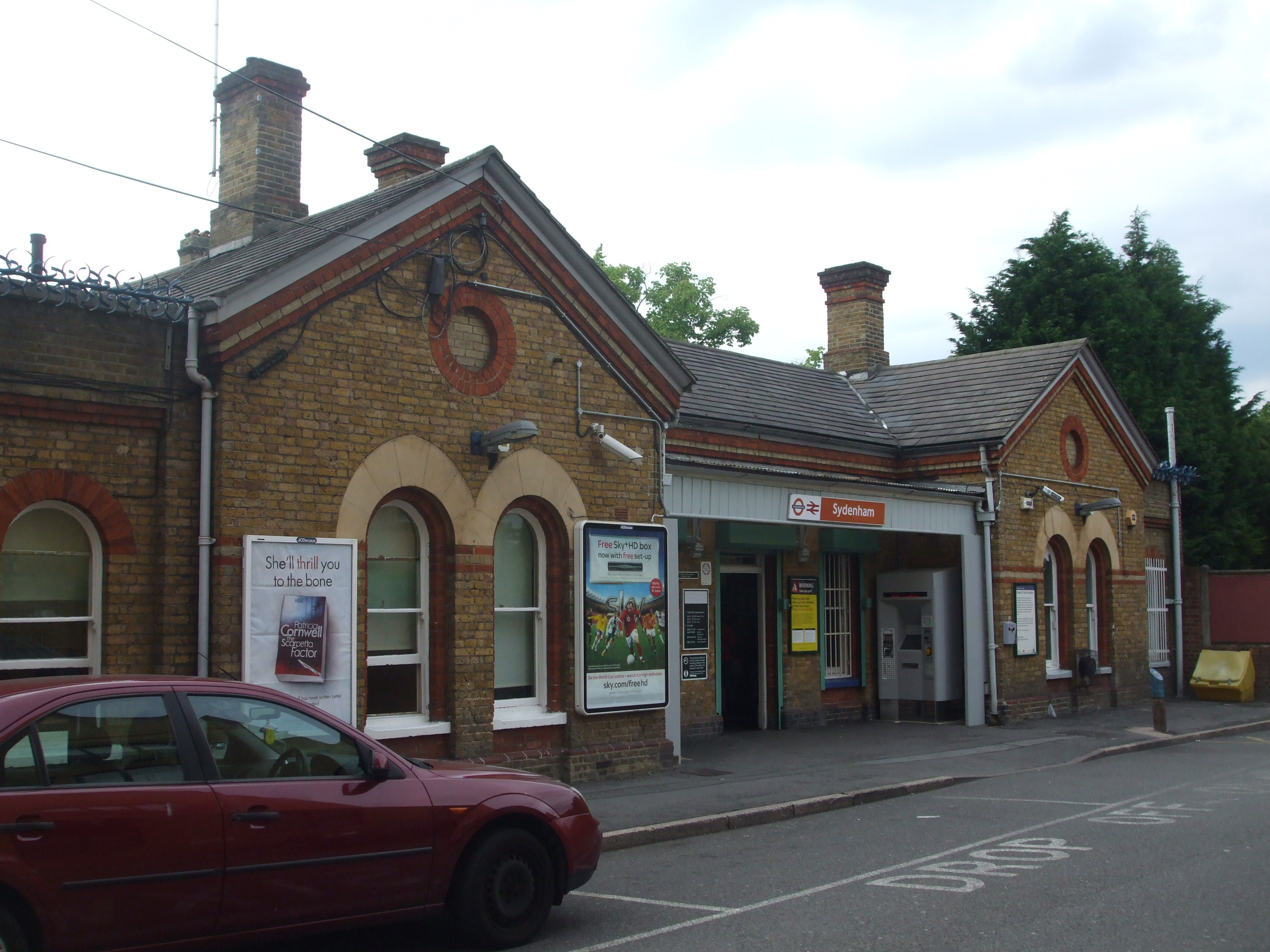
- Interactive map of Sydenham

General information
- Location: Sydenham
- Local authority: London Borough of Lewisham
- Managed by: London Overground
- Owner: Network Rail
- Station code: SYD
- DfT category: D
- Number of platforms: 2
- Tracks: 4
- Accessible: Yes
- Fare zone: 3

National Rail annual entry and exit
- 2020–21: ▼1.137 million
- 2021–22: ▲2.401 million
- 2022–23: ▲3.105 million
- 2023–24: ▲3.518 million
- 2024–25: ▲3.542 million

Key dates
- 5 June 1839: Opened by the London and Croydon Railway
- 1844: Croydon platform re-sited
- 1982: London platform re-sited
- 23 May 2010: East London line started

Other information
- External links: Departures; Facilities
- Coordinates: 51.4254°N 0.0544°W

Sydenham is an interchange station between the Windrush line of the London Overground and National Rail services operated by Southern, located in Sydenham in the London Borough of Lewisham. Originally opened in 1839, the station is located on the former Croydon Canal, which is now a branch of the Brighton Main Line, often known as the Sydenham Corridor. The station is 6 miles 32 chains (6.40 miles, 10.30 km) down the line from London Bridge. Sydenham falls within London fare zone 3.

== History ==
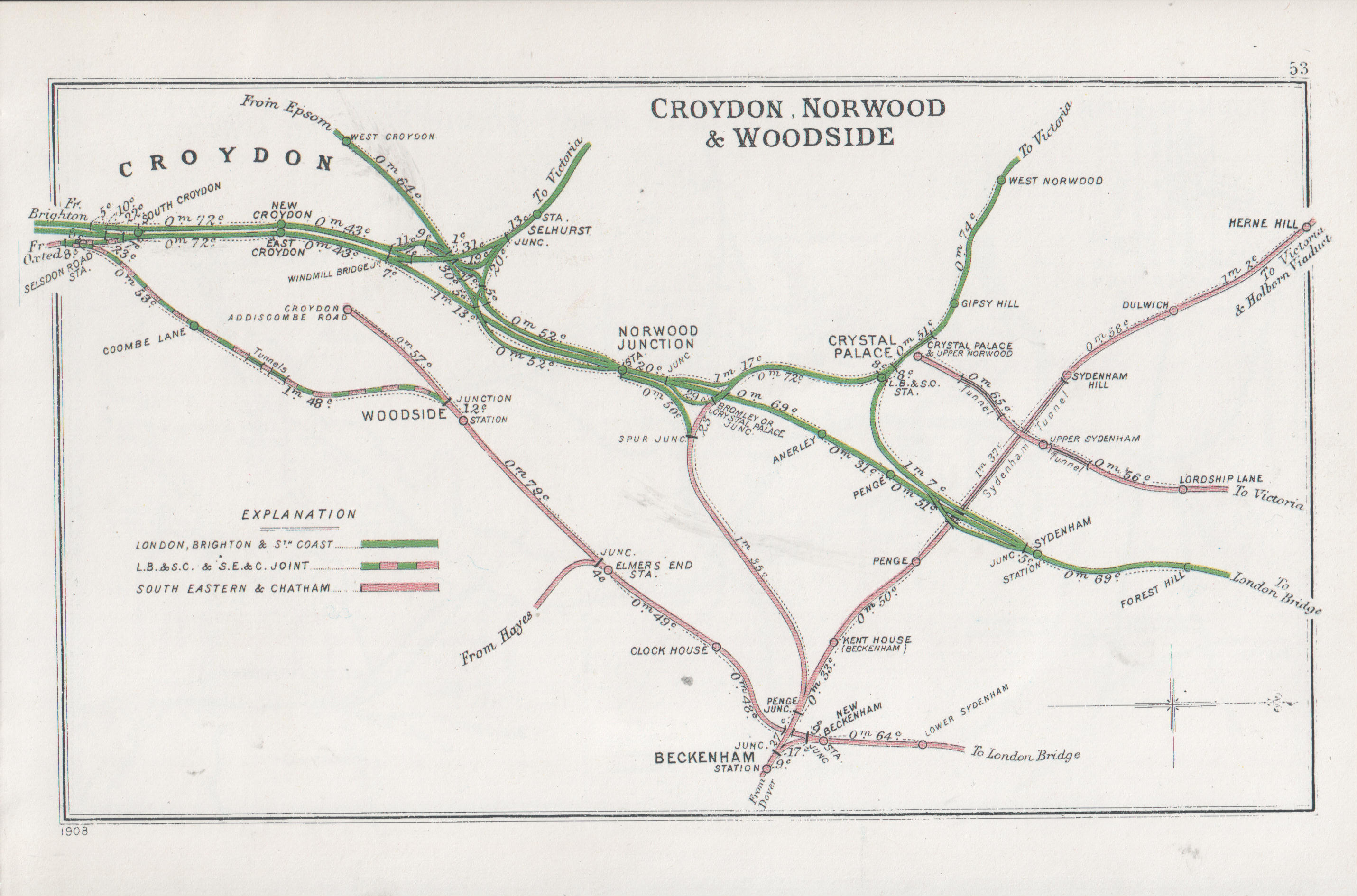
A 1908 Railway Clearing House map of lines around the Brighton Main Line between South Croydon and Selhurst / Forest Hill, as well as surrounding lines

The Croydon Canal opened in 1809 linking the Grand Surrey Canal to Croydon, however the waterway was never successful, and in 1836, it was the first canal to be abandoned by an Act of Parliament. The alignment was purchased by the London and Croydon Railway, who drained the canal and re-opened as a railway on the 5 June 1839. In 1844, L&CR was given authority to test the first atmospheric railway equipment between Dartmouth Arms (now Forest Hill) and West Croydon. In 1846, the railway became part of the London, Brighton and South Coast Railway and in the following year, the system was abandoned. The station was originally built south of Sydenham Road (A212) however, due to the construction of the branch to Crystal Palace in 1852, platform 2 was resited to its current position. Platform 1 and its station building remained south of the road bridge, until 1982 when British Rail decided to construct a replacement platform 90 meters north, parallel to Peak Hill Gardens due to the retaining wall beginning to collapse.

The Big Four grouping led to Southern Railway (SR) management until nationalistation in 1948. Between 1948 and 1982 Sydenham was part of the Southern Region and following sectorisation, until privatisation, Sydenham became part of the Network SouthEast sector. Upon privatisation in May 1996, the station management passed to Connex South Central. Connex was stripped of the franchise due to poor financial management and in 2001, Govia South Central (Southern) took over the franchise and management of the station. Southern remained the sole train provider until 2010, when London Overground took over management of the station and began running trains as part of the East London line extension (now the Windrush line).

Sydenham was the first station to serve the area, however, there are, or have been, five other stations in the Sydenham:

- Lower Sydenham on the Hayes Line
- Upper Sydenham on the now closed Crystal Palace (High Level) line
- Sydenham Hill, Penge East on the Victoria to Orpington line.

== Station layout ==
Like all intermediate stations between New Cross Gate and Norwood Junction, Sydenham has two platforms, facing two (up and down slow) of the four tracks with the two fast tracks run between the two slow lines. There are three entrances – the ticket office on platform 2 from Sydenham Station Approach, an entrance on platform 1 from Peak Hill Gardens and a gate on platform 2. A small cafe is in the main station building.

== Services ==
Sydenham is on the Windrush line of the London Overground, with services operated using Class 378 EMUs. Additional services are operated by Southern using Class 377 EMUs.

The typical off-peak service in trains per hour is:

- 2 tph to London Bridge
- 8 tph to Highbury & Islington via Surrey Quays (Windrush line)
- 2 tph to London Victoria via Streatham Hill
- 4 tph to Crystal Palace (Windrush line)
- 4 tph to West Croydon (Windrush line)

In the peak hours, the station is served by 4tph to London Bridge as well as 2 trains that run down to Sutton.

Preceding station	National Rail	Following station
Forest Hill	Southern Crystal Palace Line	Crystal Palace
Forest Hill	Southern Brighton Main Line; Stopping Services Limited Service	Penge West
Preceding station	London Overground	Following station
Forest Hill towards Highbury & Islington	Windrush line East London line	Crystal Palace Terminus
Forest Hill towards Highbury & Islington	Windrush line East London line	Penge West towards West Croydon

== Connections ==
London Buses routes 122, 176, 197, 202 and 450 serve the station. While routes 75 and 194 run close by.
