= Crystal Palace railway station =

National Rail station in London, England

Crystal Palace
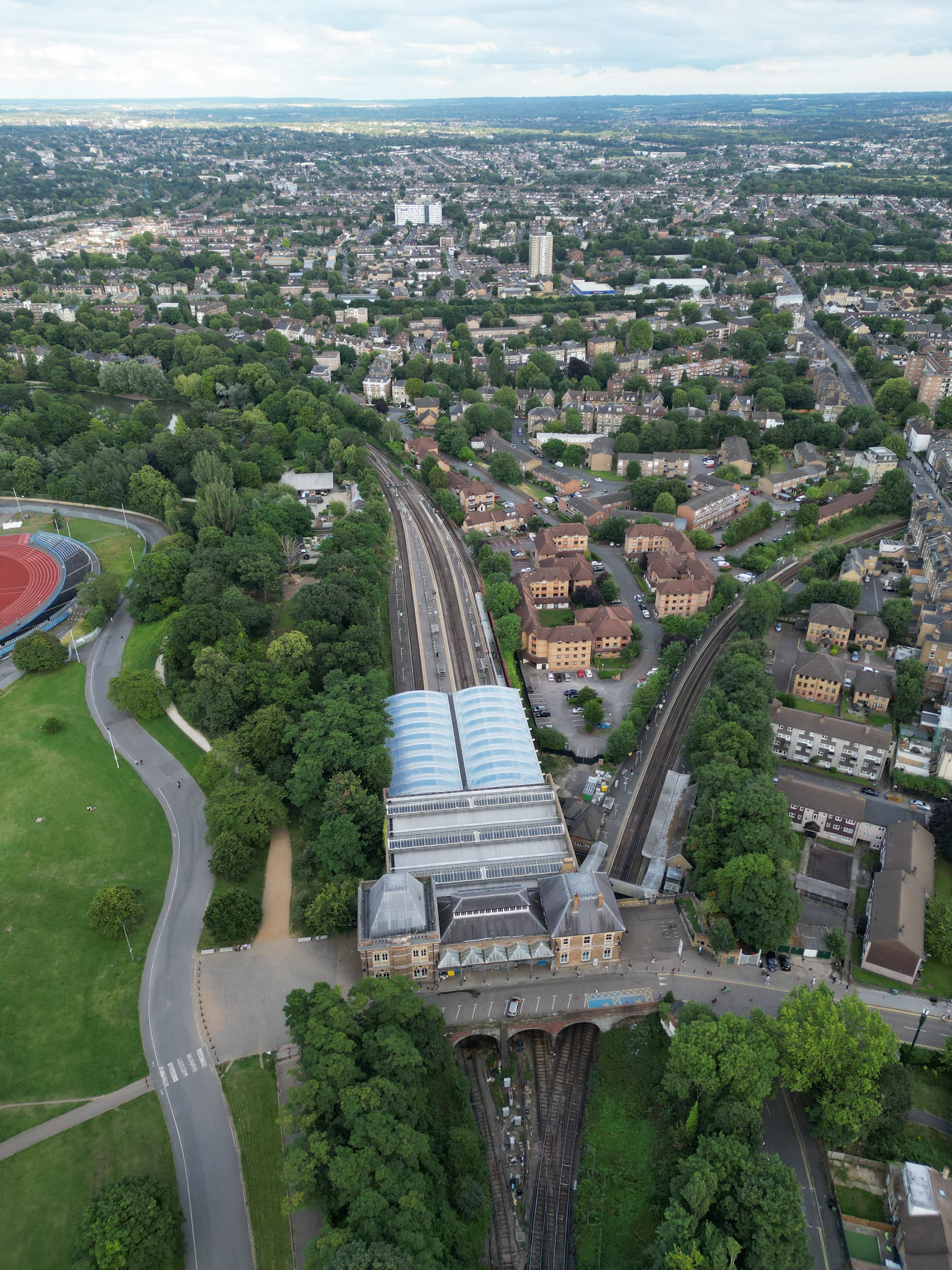
- Aerial view of the Crystal Palace railway station (2024)
- Interactive map of Crystal Palace

General information
- Location: Crystal Palace
- Local authority: London Borough of Bromley
- Managed by: London Overground
- Owner: Network Rail
- Station code: CYP
- DfT category: D
- Number of platforms: 6
- Accessible: Yes (ramp required between train and platform)
- Fare zone: 3 and 4
- Cycle parking: Yes - external
- Toilet facilities: Yes - behind gateline

National Rail annual entry and exit
- 2020–21: ▼0.942 million
- Interchange: ▼57,653
- 2021–22: ▲2.003 million
- Interchange: ▲0.114 million
- 2022–23: ▲2.412 million
- Interchange: ▲0.115 million
- 2023–24: ▲2.746 million
- Interchange: ▲0.130 million
- 2024–25: ▲2.782 million
- Interchange: ▲0.157 million

Key dates
- 10 June 1854: Opened (Crystal Palace)
- 1856: Through station
- 1 November 1898: Renamed (Crystal Palace Low Level)
- 13 June 1955: Renamed (Crystal Palace)

Other information
- External links: Departures; Facilities
- Coordinates: 51.4182°N 0.0726°W

Crystal Palace is an interchange station between the Windrush line of the London Overground and National Rail services operated by Southern, situated in the London Borough of Bromley in south London. It is located in the Anerley area between the town centres of Crystal Palace and Penge, 8 miles 56 chains (14.0 km) from London Victoria. It is one of two stations built to serve the site of the 1851 exhibition building, the Crystal Palace, when it was moved from Hyde Park to Sydenham Hill after 1851.

The station was opened on 10 June 1854 by the West End of London and Crystal Palace Railway (WEL&CPR) to take the crowds to the relocated Palace. It was formerly known as Crystal Palace (Low Level) to differentiate it from the nearby and now largely demolished Crystal Palace (High Level) railway station.

The station serves Southern trains running between London Bridge and London Victoria in addition to services terminating at Beckenham Junction and West Croydon. Since 23 May 2010, the station has also been a southern terminus of the Windrush line of the London Overground. This has been the catalyst for plans for a substantial redevelopment of the station.

== History ==
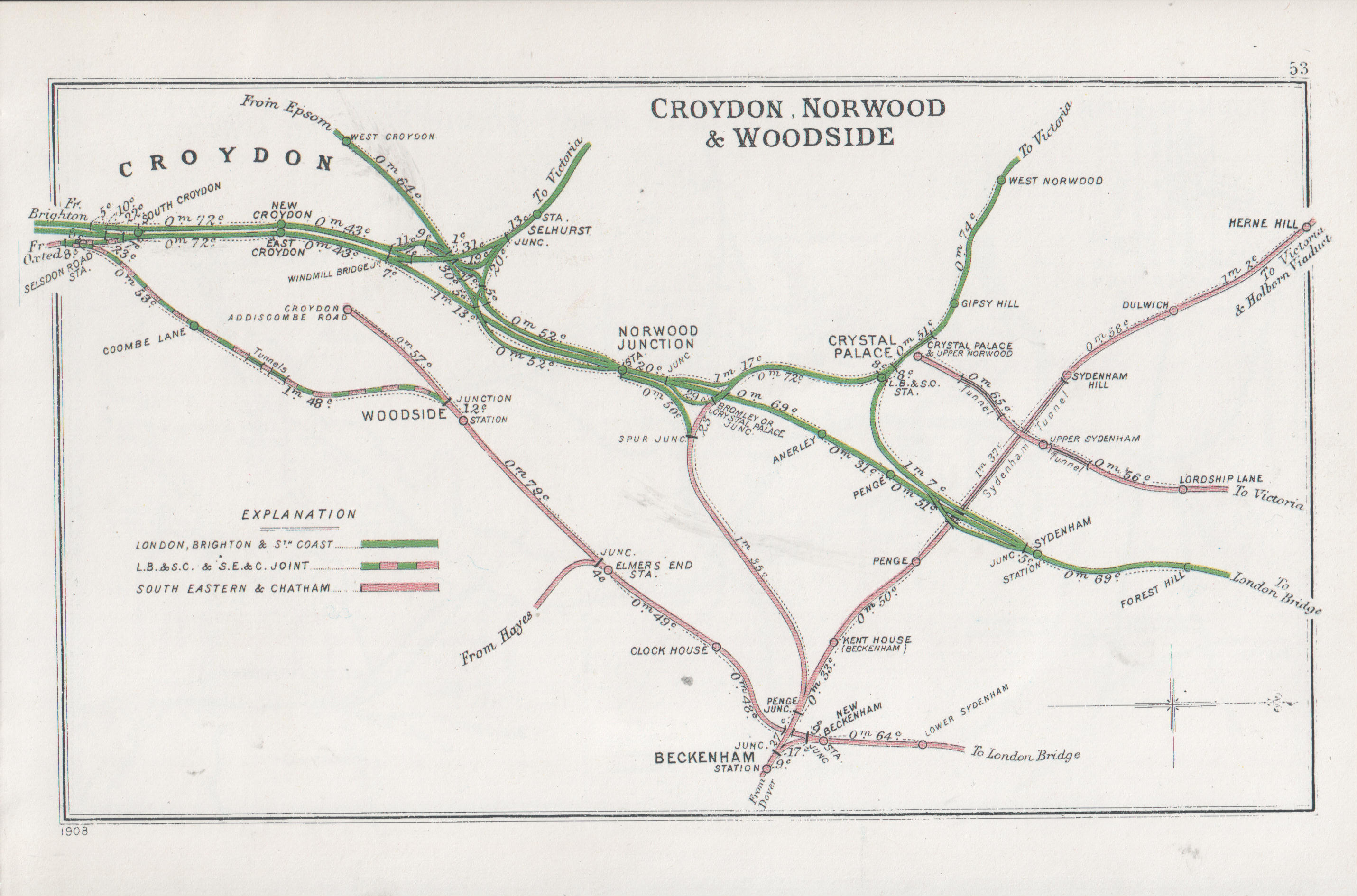
A 1908 Railway Clearing House map of lines around the Crystal Palace railway station, as well as surrounding lines

From the outset trains were operated by the London, Brighton and South Coast Railway (LBSCR). Initially the station was the terminus of a spur line from Sydenham. In 1856 the station was able to take through train services to Wandsworth via West Norwood and Streatham Hill, following the completion of the 746 yard (690 m) Crystal Palace Tunnel. Although relatively short, the tunnel was regarded as a major engineering achievement as it was cut "through the same treacherous material [clay], through the hill on which the Crystal Palace stands, and immediately under one of the great water towers, a superincumbent weight of 2,200 tons which taxed in its execution all the skill and workmanship of the eminent contractors."

In 1857, an eastward connection was made to Norwood Junction (for the Brighton line to the south) and in 1858 the WEL&CPR was extended as far as Beckenham. From 1860 direct services were extended to London Victoria.

As originally constructed, the station contained three island platforms, arranged to provide two terminal bay platforms and two through lines with platforms on either side. By the 1890s the central island had been removed and replaced by carriage sidings.

The frontage of the station was rebuilt in 1875, and was described: "Although the Roman Catholic chapel room is no longer used the station still has a cathedral-like atmosphere as one passes from the period booking hall to the vault-like station and the stairs down to the original station area".

This is a description of the station trainshed roof above the staircases at the west end. Originally the whole length of the platforms beyond the bottom of the massive staircases was covered by an elegant dual bow-spring arch iron roof. This was removed as a precautionary measure shortly after the collapse of the similar structure at Charing Cross in 1905.

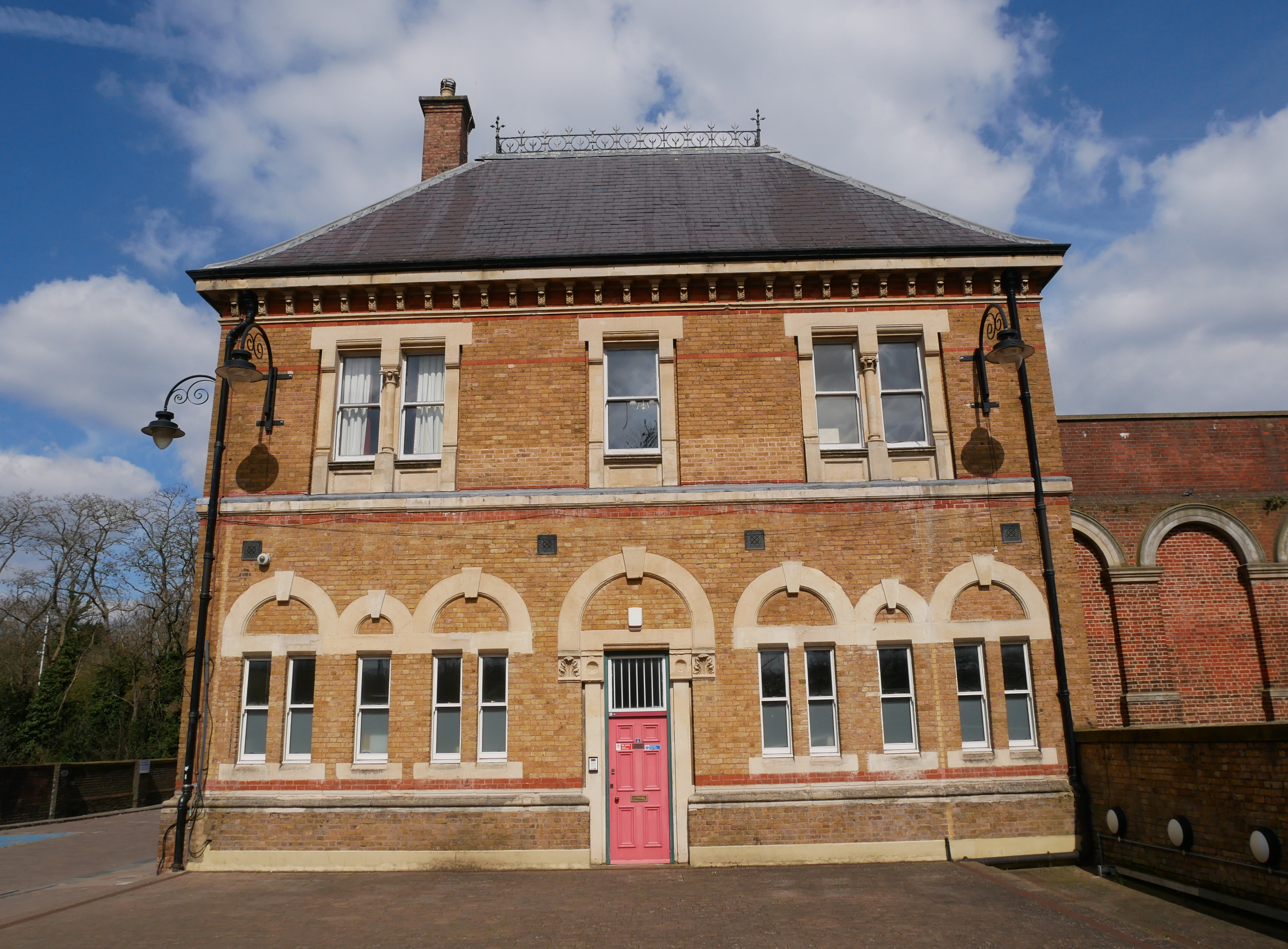
The external southwest face of the station

In 1905–08, Crystal Palace station was included in a proposal for an unusual new form of underground railway, the Kearney High-Speed Tube, devised by the Australian-born engineer Elfric Wells Chalmers Kearney. He envisaged the construction of a tunnel which would run from Crystal Palace to Cricklewood in north-west London, with a branch line terminating at Strand. It was to be operated with an unusual monorail system patented by Kearney which would be powered by gravity, like a type of underground roller coaster. Kearney failed to attract support for his scheme and the line was never built.

The line was electrified between Balham and Crystal Palace on 12 May 1911, using the LBSCR overhead system, in time for the Festival of Empire coinciding with the coronation of King George V. Electric trains from Victoria were advertised to complete the journey in fifteen minutes – a running time that has never been equalled.

The station is built on the junction of two lines: the original station platforms lying on the Sydenham route, and the later platforms on the southern spur to Norwood Junction and Beckenham Junction.

Following the fire in 1936 which destroyed the Crystal Palace, passenger numbers fell and most services through the station were diverted to serve London–Croydon routes rather than running along the London Bridge–Victoria loop. The southern platforms became the busier pair and the entrance to the station was moved to the south side of the building in the 1980s. A glazed ticket hall, which echoed the profile of the Crystal Palace with its arched roof structure, was constructed at this time on the southern flank of the Victorian building.

The two outer bay platforms, which were used by terminating trains, were abandoned in the 1970s and the third rail was removed, although the track and buffers were left in place. The southern bay was brought back into use in May 2010 as part of the East London line development.

The original station was partially refurbished in 2002 by Railtrack at a cost of £4 million. This included a substantial amount of work on the roof of the building and refurbishment of office space on the top floor.

== Station redevelopment for East London line ==
To accommodate the additional East London line services (now the Windrush line), and to provide disabled access to all platforms of the station, substantial works were required at the station. A planning application was submitted to Bromley Council in February 2009, for alterations to the Victorian booking hall building, removal of the current ticket office, removal of the pedestrian bridge over platforms 1 and 2 and new stairs to platform 1, but funding constraints meant that this work had not started before East London line services started calling at the station in 2010.

London Overground trains terminate in either the southern (formerly disused) bay platform 3, or a new bay platform 5, part of the reinstated central platform which has been built over the site of the removed sidings, in the centre of the old station. The two through lines serve platform 4 (previously platform 3) and platform 6, the north side face of the new central island. The former platform 4 is no longer in public use, and while at the time of the East London line service commencing it still had its platform furniture and information displays, these have since been removed.

Refurbishment work funded by Transport for London started in 2012. The original Victorian booking hall was reopened on 24 September 2012 along with a new cafe in an adjacent part of the station building. The 1980s booking hall addition was demolished in October 2012.

Three lifts have been installed to improve accessibility within the station. These give access to all platforms – there are two levels below the refurbished Victorian ticket hall. Refurbishment and improvement works were completed on 26 March 2013.

Transport for London were also proposing to extend Tramlink from Harrington Road through Anerley to the bus station on Crystal Palace Parade. However, Mayor Boris Johnson cancelled the £170 million project in November 2008.

A new roof was built covering the four Northern platforms in 2015.

== Connections ==
London Buses routes 157, 249, 358, 410, 432 and night route N3 serve the station.

== Platforms ==
The platform arrangement at Crystal Palace is as follows:

- Platform 1 is used for northbound Southern services to London Victoria via Streatham Hill and westbound Southern services to London Bridge via Tulse Hill.
- Platform 2 is used for southbound Southern services to West Croydon (terminating at Norwood Junction in the evening) and Beckenham Junction.
- Platform 3 is used for Windrush line (London Overground) northbound services to Highbury & Islington via New Cross Gate.
- Platform 4 is used for westbound Southern services to London Victoria via Streatham Hill.
- Platform 5 is mainly used for Windrush line (London Overground) northbound services to Highbury & Islington via New Cross Gate.
- Platform 6 is used for eastbound Southern services to London Bridge via Forest Hill.

== Services ==
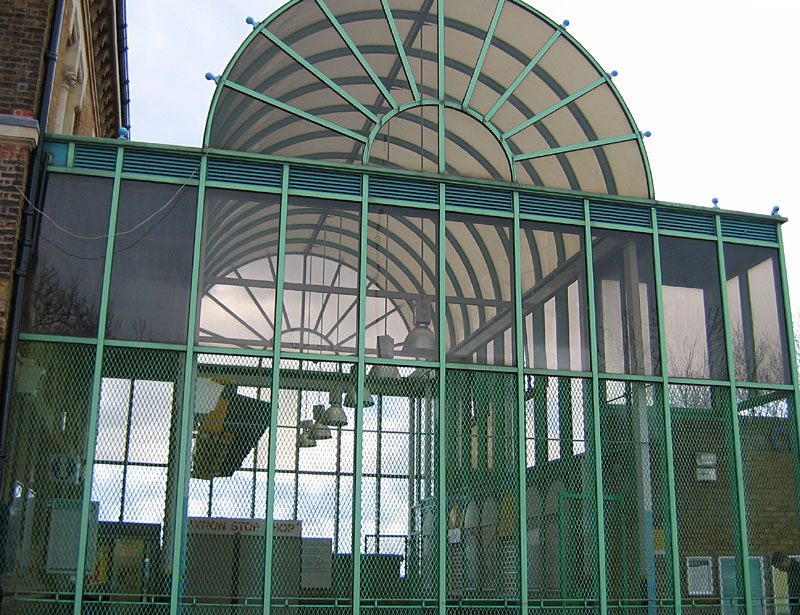
The 1980s booking office and station entrance, designed to imitate the central section of the Crystal Palace, was demolished in October 2012 following the reopening of the original Victorian entrance

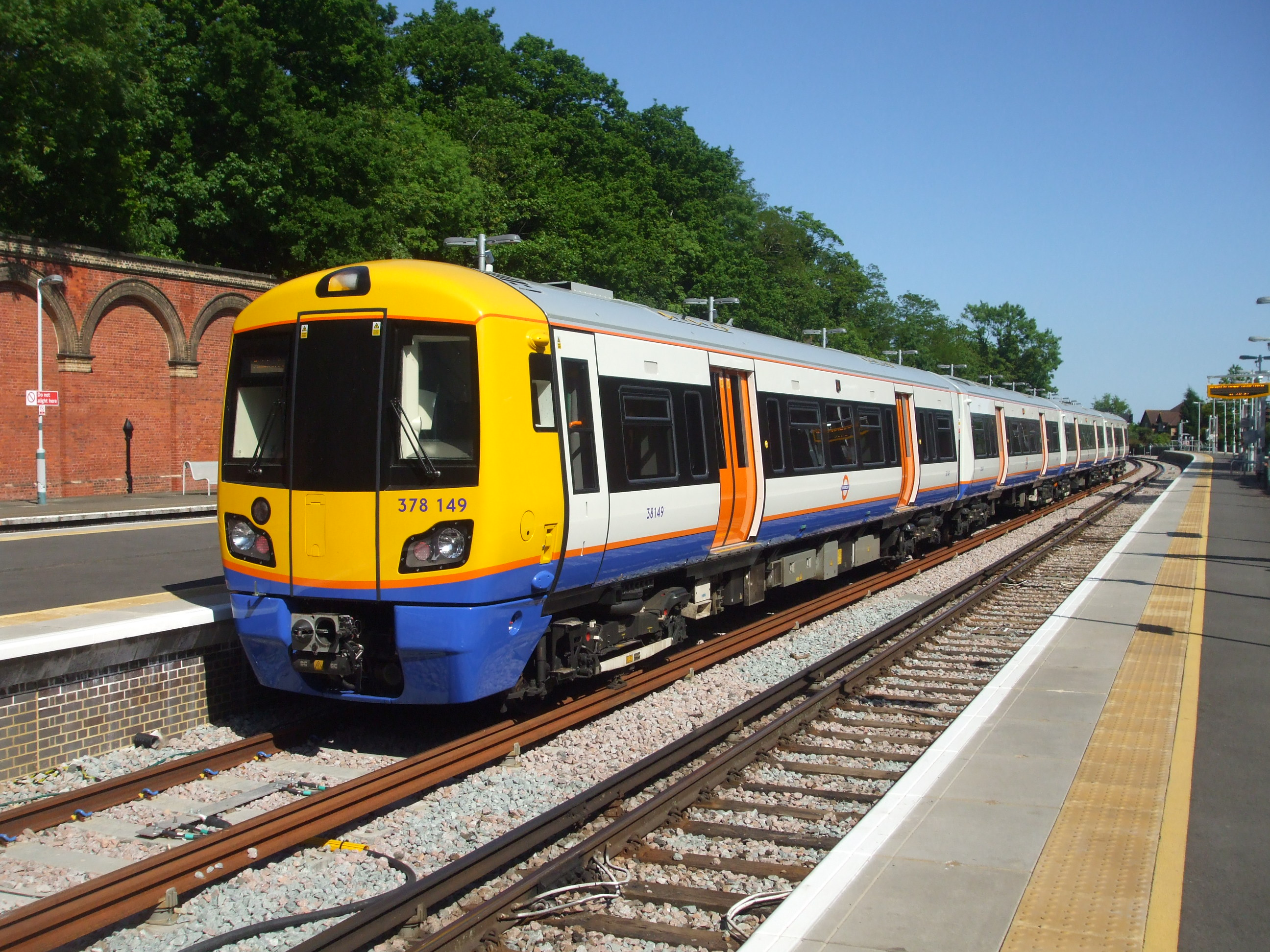
London Overground train at Crystal Palace

Crystal Palace is a southern terminus of the Windrush line of the London Overground, with services operated using Class 378 EMUs. Additional services at Crystal Palace are operated by Southern using Class 377 EMUs.

The typical off-peak service in trains per hour is:

- 4 tph to London Victoria
- 4 tph to London Bridge (2 of these run via Tulse Hill and 2 run via Forest Hill)
- 4 tph to Highbury & Islington via Surrey Quays (Windrush line)
- 2 tph to West Croydon
- 2 tph to Beckenham Junction

During the evenings, the services between London Victoria and West Croydon do not run and the services between London Bridge and Beckenham Junction are reduced to hourly.

On Sundays, the services between London Bridge and Beckenham Junction do not run.

Preceding station	National Rail	Following station
Gipsy Hill	Southern Crystal Palace Line Monday-Saturday only	Birkbeck
Gipsy Hill	Southern Brighton Main Line	Norwood Junction
Gipsy Hill	Southern Brighton Main Line	Sydenham
Preceding station	London Overground	Following station
Terminus	Windrush line East London line	Sydenham towards Highbury & Islington

== See also ==
- Crystal Palace bus station
