= Surrey Quays railway station =

London Overground station

Surrey Quays
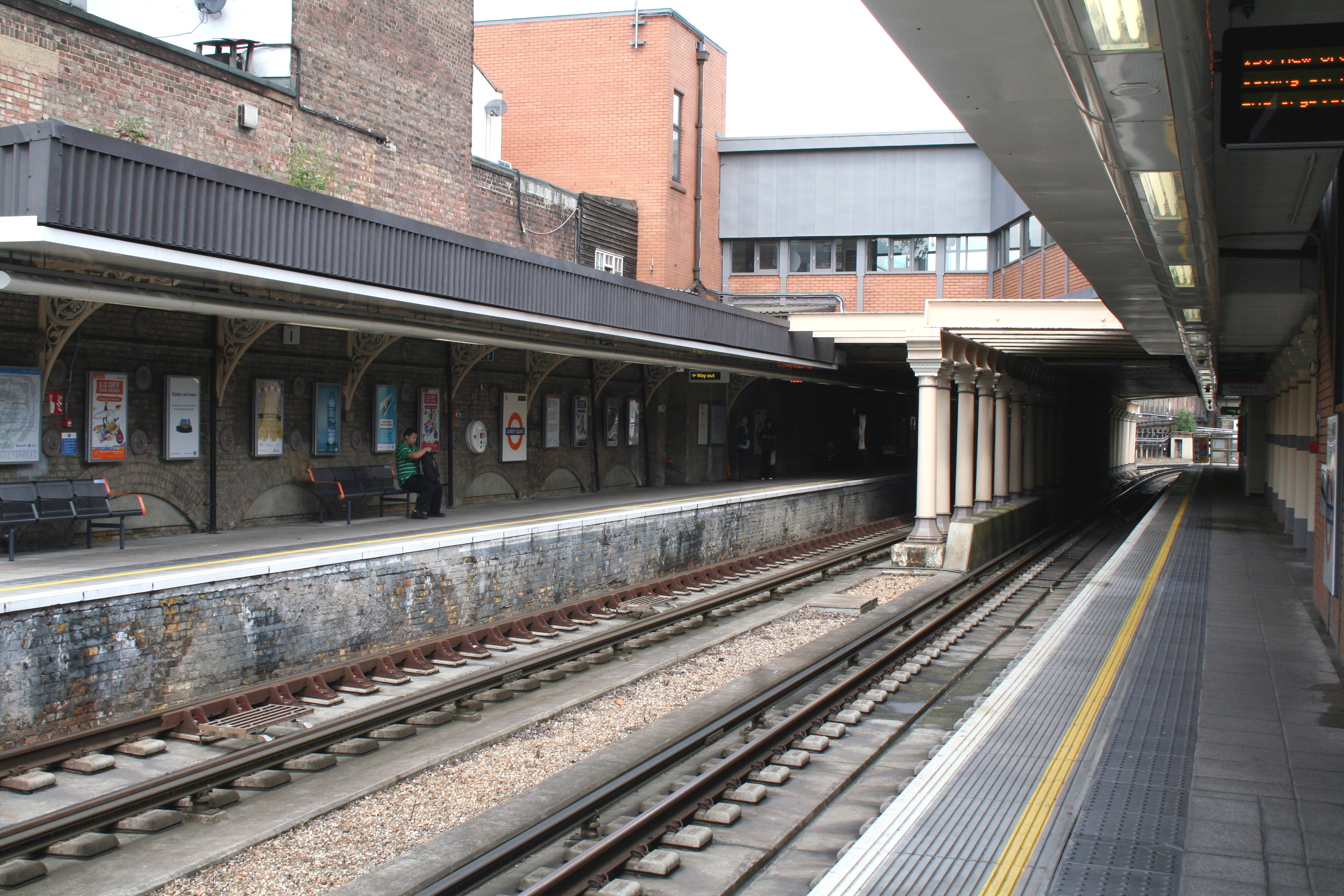
- Interactive map of Surrey Quays

General information
- Location: Surrey Quays
- Local authority: London Borough of Southwark
- Managed by: London Overground
- Owner: Transport for London
- Station code: SQE
- Number of platforms: 2
- Accessible: Yes
- Fare zone: 2

National Rail annual entry and exit
- 2020–21: ▼1.494 million
- Interchange: ▼0.136 million
- 2021–22: ▲3.425 million
- Interchange: ▲0.318 million
- 2022–23: ▲4.349 million
- Interchange: ▲0.517 million
- 2023–24: ▲4.985 million
- Interchange: ▲1.167 million
- 2024–25: ▼4.934 million
- Interchange: ▲1.273 million

Key dates
- 7 December 1869: Opened as Deptford Road
- 17 July 1911: Renamed Surrey Docks
- 24 October 1989: Renamed Surrey Quays
- 1995: Line and station closed temporarily
- 1998: Line and station reopened
- 22 December 2007: Line and station closed temporarily
- 27 April 2010: Line and station reopened

Other information
- External links: Departures; Facilities
- Coordinates: 51.49358°N 0.04717°W

Surrey Quays is a railway station on the Windrush line of the London Overground network; it is located in Rotherhithe, in the London Borough of Southwark, England. Situated in London fare zone 2, the next station to the north is Canada Water; to the south, the line splits into branches to Clapham Junction, Crystal Palace, New Cross and West Croydon. Closed in late 2007 as a London Underground station on the East London line, it was refurbished and reopened as part of London Overground on 27 April 2010.

== History ==
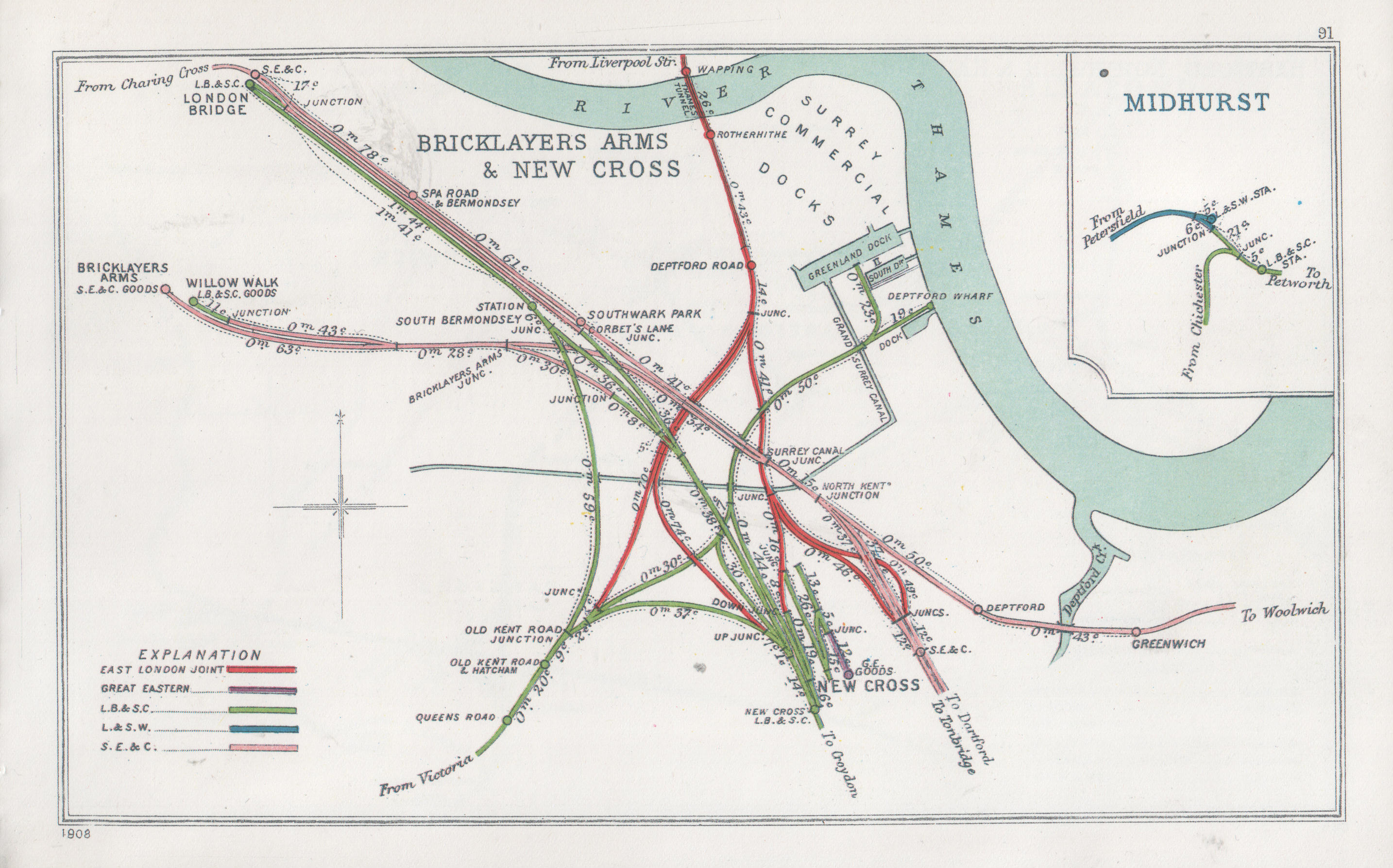
A 1908 Railway Clearing House map of lines in south-east London, including the southern portion of the East London line

The station was built by the East London Railway Company and opened on 7 December 1869; it was originally known as Deptford Road. On 17 July 1911, it was renamed Surrey Docks, in reference to the nearby Surrey Commercial Docks which closed in the 1960s; it was renamed Surrey Quays on 24 October 1989, following the construction of the nearby Surrey Quays Shopping Centre. This was a somewhat controversial move, for some of the local community felt that their heritage was being eroded; however, the name stuck and the Surrey Docks part of Rotherhithe is now often referred to as Surrey Quays.

In the 1950s and 1960s, London Underground planned a new line connecting north-west and south-east London. Approval for the first stage of the Fleet line (Note: The proposed Fleet line was renamed the Jubilee line in 1975.) to Charing Cross was granted in 1969, with the second and third stages approved in 1971 and 1972. The station was planned to be part of phase 3 running to Lewisham; new tunnels to and from the City of London would have come to the surface north of the station. East London line trains would have terminated at Surrey Docks, with London Underground services to New Cross and New Cross Gate being taken over by the new line. Phases 2 and 3 were not carried out due to a lack of funds. Eventually, due to changing land usage and the growth of Canary Wharf, the Jubilee line was extended via Canada Water instead.

For much of its history, the station's importance lay in its proximity to the Surrey Commercial Docks; it was at the south end of Canada Dock (now Canada Water) and a few hundred yards from the principal entrance to the docks. Its usage fell considerably after the docks closed, but was revived following the redevelopment of the London Docklands in the 1980s and 1990s.

The service was closed between 1995 and 1998, due to repair work on the East London Line's Thames Tunnel; ELL-branded replacement buses operated the service in the interim.

The new entrance to Surrey Quays station shortly after completion in 2026

The East London line closed permanently as an Underground line on 22 December 2007. It reopened for preview services on 27 April 2010 to New Cross and New Cross Gate. On 23 May 2010, the full service commenced to New Cross, West Croydon and Crystal Palace, becoming part of the London Overground system. On 9 December 2012, Phase 2 of East London line extension opened to the public and was launched the next day by the Mayor of London, Boris Johnson. It provides services to Clapham Junction, via Peckham Rye, thus completing the London Overground Orbital link.

In February 2021, Transport for London announced plans to upgrade the station, with a new entrance and ticket hall, improved capacity and step-free access. On 2 February 2023, TfL awarded the contract to start construction, with works due to start in the summer. The new entrance opened on 11 September 2026.

== Services ==
London Overground operates the following typical off-peak service in trains per hour (tph) is:

- 16 tph to Dalston Junction; of which:
  - 8 tph continue to Highbury & Islington
- 4 tph to Crystal Palace
- 4 tph to West Croydon
- 4 tph to New Cross
- 4 tph to Clapham Junction.

Preceding station	London Overground	Following station
Canada Water towards Dalston Junction or Highbury & Islington	Windrush line East London line and South London line	New Cross Terminus
Canada Water towards Dalston Junction or Highbury & Islington	Windrush line East London line and South London line	New Cross Gate towards Crystal Palace or West Croydon
Canada Water towards Dalston Junction or Highbury & Islington	Windrush line East London line and South London line	Queens Road Peckham towards Clapham Junction or Battersea Park
Former services
Preceding station	London Underground	Following station
Rotherhithe towards Hammersmith	Metropolitan line (1884–1906) (1913–1939)	New Cross Terminus
Rotherhithe towards Hammersmith	Metropolitan line (1913–1939)	New Cross Gate Terminus
Rotherhithe towards Richmond, Wimbledon, Ealing Broadway or South Harrow	District line (1884–1905)	New Cross Gate Terminus
Rotherhithe towards Whitechapel or Shoreditch	East London line (1913–1999)	New Cross Terminus
Rotherhithe towards Whitechapel or Shoreditch	East London line (1913–1999)	New Cross Gate Terminus
Canada Water towards Whitechapel or Shoreditch	East London line (1999–2006)	New Cross Terminus
Canada Water towards Whitechapel or Shoreditch	East London line (1999–2006)	New Cross Gate Terminus
Abandoned plans
Preceding station	London Underground	Following station
Fenchurch Street towards Stanmore	Jubilee line Phase 3 (never constructed)	New Cross Gate Terminus
Fenchurch Street towards Stanmore	Jubilee line Phase 3 (never constructed)	New Cross towards Lewisham

== Onward connections ==
London Buses routes 1, 47, 188, 199, 225, 381 and night routes N199 and N381 serve the station.
