= Shoreditch station =

Shoreditch station may refer to:

- Shoreditch High Street railway station
- Shoreditch railway station (closed in 1940)
- Shoreditch tube station (closed in 2006)
