= Shoreditch High Street railway station =

London Overground station

Shoreditch High Street
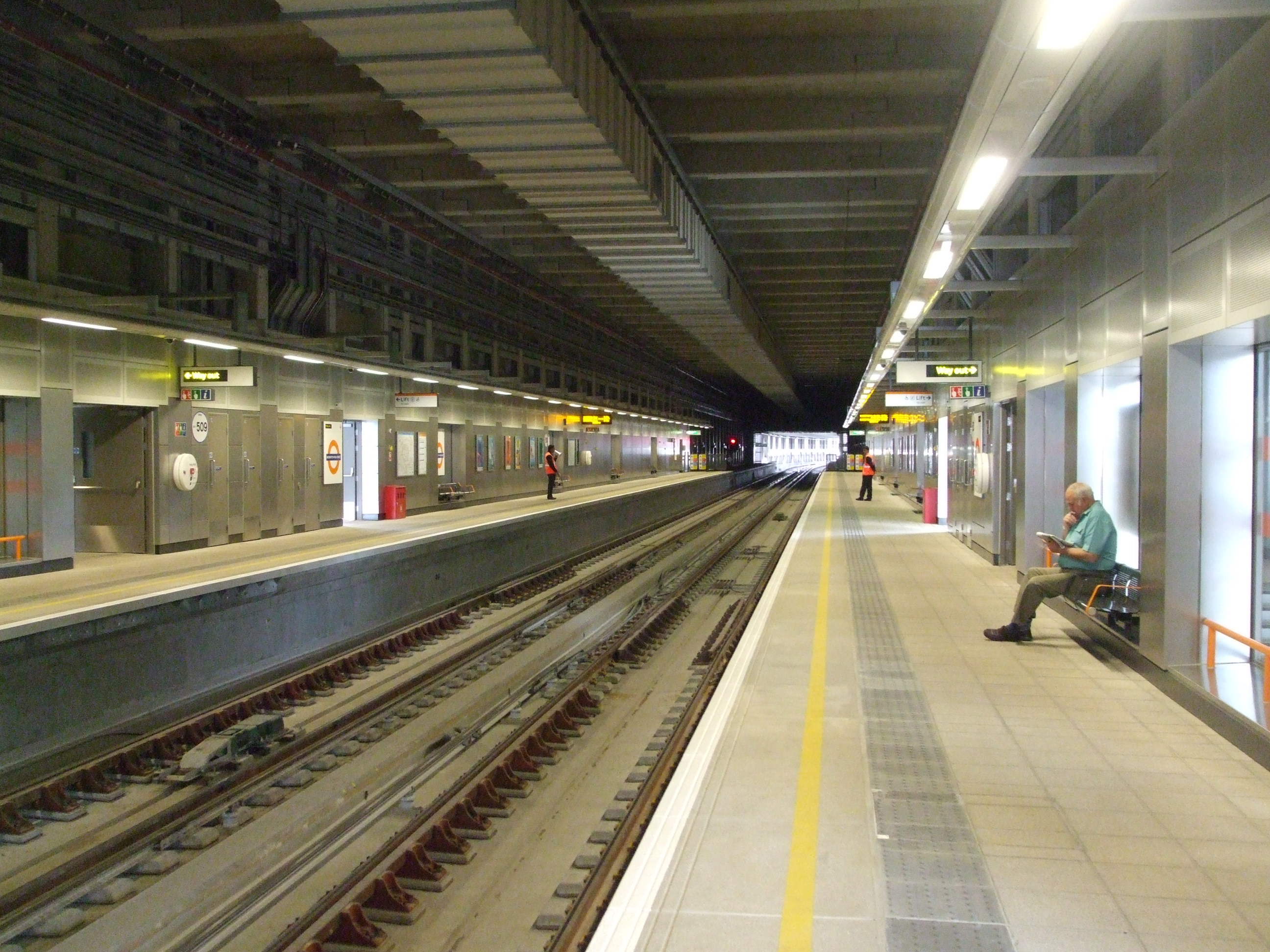
- Interactive map of Shoreditch High Street

General information
- Location: Shoreditch
- Local authority: London Borough of Tower Hamlets & Hackney
- Managed by: London Overground
- Owner: Transport for London
- Station code: SDC
- Number of platforms: 2
- Accessible: Yes
- Fare zone: 1

National Rail annual entry and exit
- 2020–21: ▼1.403 million
- Interchange: ▼0.139 million
- 2021–22: ▲4.844 million
- Interchange: ▲0.289 million
- 2022–23: ▲7.054 million
- Interchange: ▲0.406 million
- 2023–24: ▲7.806 million
- Interchange: ▼0.374 million
- 2024–25: ▼7.295 million
- Interchange: ▲0.383 million

Key dates
- 27 April 2010: Opened

Other information
- External links: Departures; Facilities
- Coordinates: 51.52326°N 0.07524°W

Shoreditch High Street is a station on the Windrush line of the London Overground, located on Bethnal Green Road in Shoreditch, East London. Situated in London fare zone 1, it is located between Whitechapel and Hoxton stations. The station opened on 27 April 2010 as part of the East London line extension, replacing the nearby London Underground station at Shoreditch which closed in 2006.

== History ==
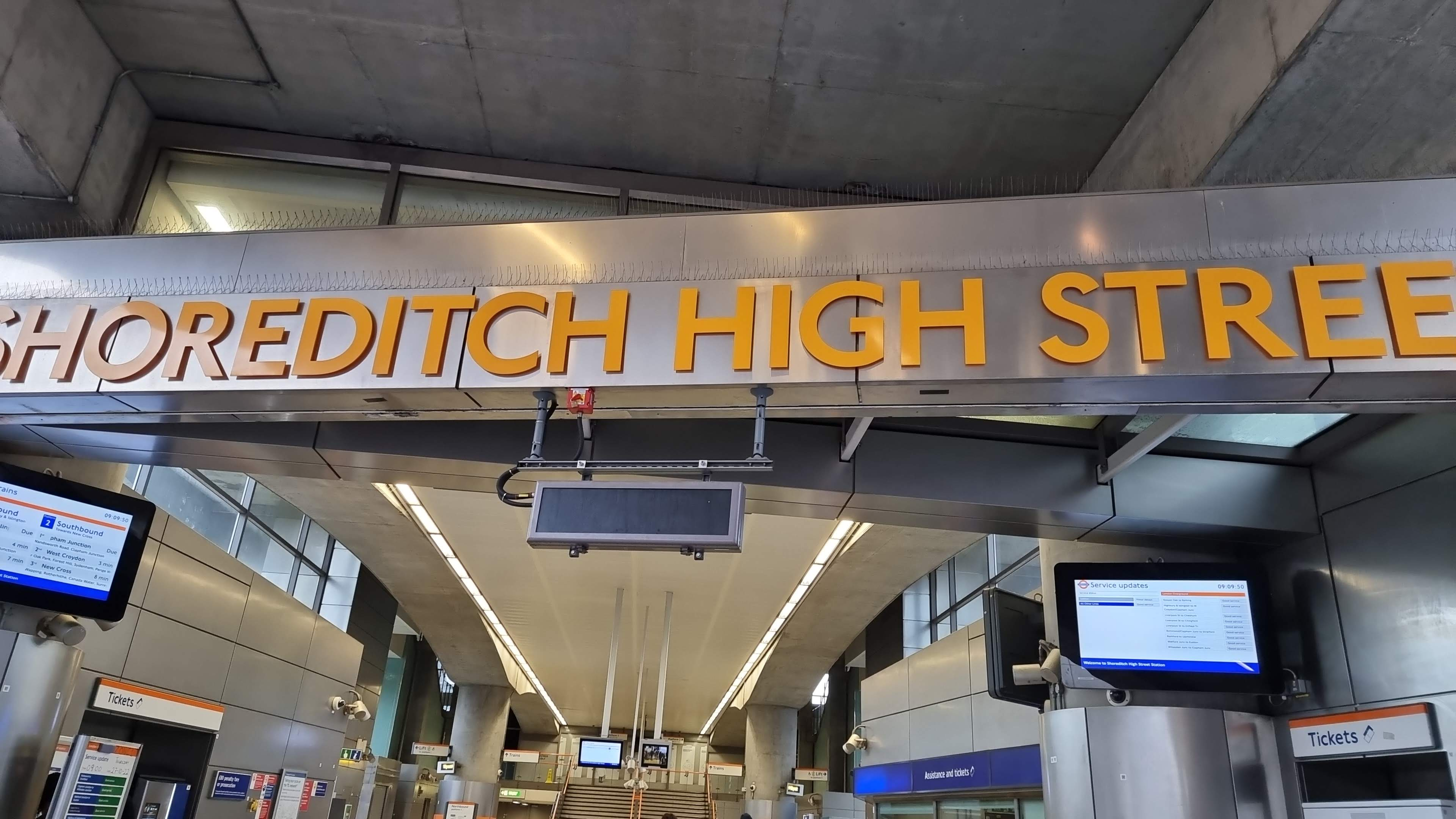
Entrance to the station

On the 1994 planning version of the underground map, the station was called 'Bishopsgate'.

In May 2008 Abdal Ullah, a Tower Hamlets London Borough Councillor, called for the new station to be renamed Banglatown, claiming this would better reflect the area in which it will stand, being a centre of the Bangladeshi community. However Transport for London noted that changing the name would cost £2 million and "cause confusion". Councillor Ullah had previously campaigned to change the name of Aldgate East Underground station to "Brick Lane".

The station was built on the former site of the Eastern Counties Railway's Shoreditch station, built in 1840. The original station was later renamed Bishopsgate and converted for use as a goods yard. It was destroyed by fire in 1964 and remained derelict until being partially demolished in 2003–04, with the exception of a number of Grade II listed structures: ornamental gates on Shoreditch High Street and the remaining 850 feet (260 m) of the "Braithwaite Viaduct", one of the oldest railway structures in the world and the second-oldest in London, designed by John Braithwaite.

The present station is built on upright supports as a viaduct, being fully enclosed in a concrete box structure. This is so future building works on the remainder of the Bishopsgate site can be undertaken keeping the station operational. Future buildings have the option of being constructed over the station. The station is situated on a section of track constructed to link the original East London line and the formerly disused North London Railway's Kingsland Viaduct. Construction of the link included a new bridge over Shoreditch High Street and links to Whitechapel via a bridge over Brick Lane and a ramp on the site of the former Shoreditch tube station.

London Overground began running 24-hour trains on Friday and Saturday nights between Dalston Junction and New Cross Gate which called at Shoreditch High Street from 15 December 2017.

On 7 August 2024, an artwork by Banksy, featuring three monkeys apparently swinging from the parapet, appeared on the Brick Lane bridge.

== Services and connections ==
Shoreditch High Street is served by the Windrush line of the London Overground. On Mondays to Saturdays there is a service every 5–10 minutes throughout the day, while on Sundays before 13:00 there is a service every 5–9 minutes, changing to every 7–8 minutes until the end of service after that.

Current off peak frequency in trains per hour is:

- 16 tph to Dalston Junction, of which 8 continue to Highbury & Islington
- 4 tph to Crystal Palace
- 4 tph to New Cross
- 4 tph to West Croydon
- 4 tph to Clapham Junction via Peckham Rye

London Bus routes 8, 26, 35, 47, 78, 135, 149, 205, 242, 388 and night routes N8, N26, N205 and N242 serve the station.

== Future proposals ==
There have been discussions of creating an interchange with the Central line between Liverpool Street and Bethnal Green, due to the line's tunnels running almost underneath the station. However, it was said that it wouldn't start until the Elizabeth line project was completed, due to extreme crowding on the Central line during peak hours.

Preceding station	London Overground	Following station
Hoxton towards Dalston Junction or Highbury & Islington	Windrush line East London line and South London line	Whitechapel towards Clapham Junction, Battersea Park, Crystal Palace, New Cross or West Croydon
