= New Cross Gate railway station =

London Overground station

New Cross Gate
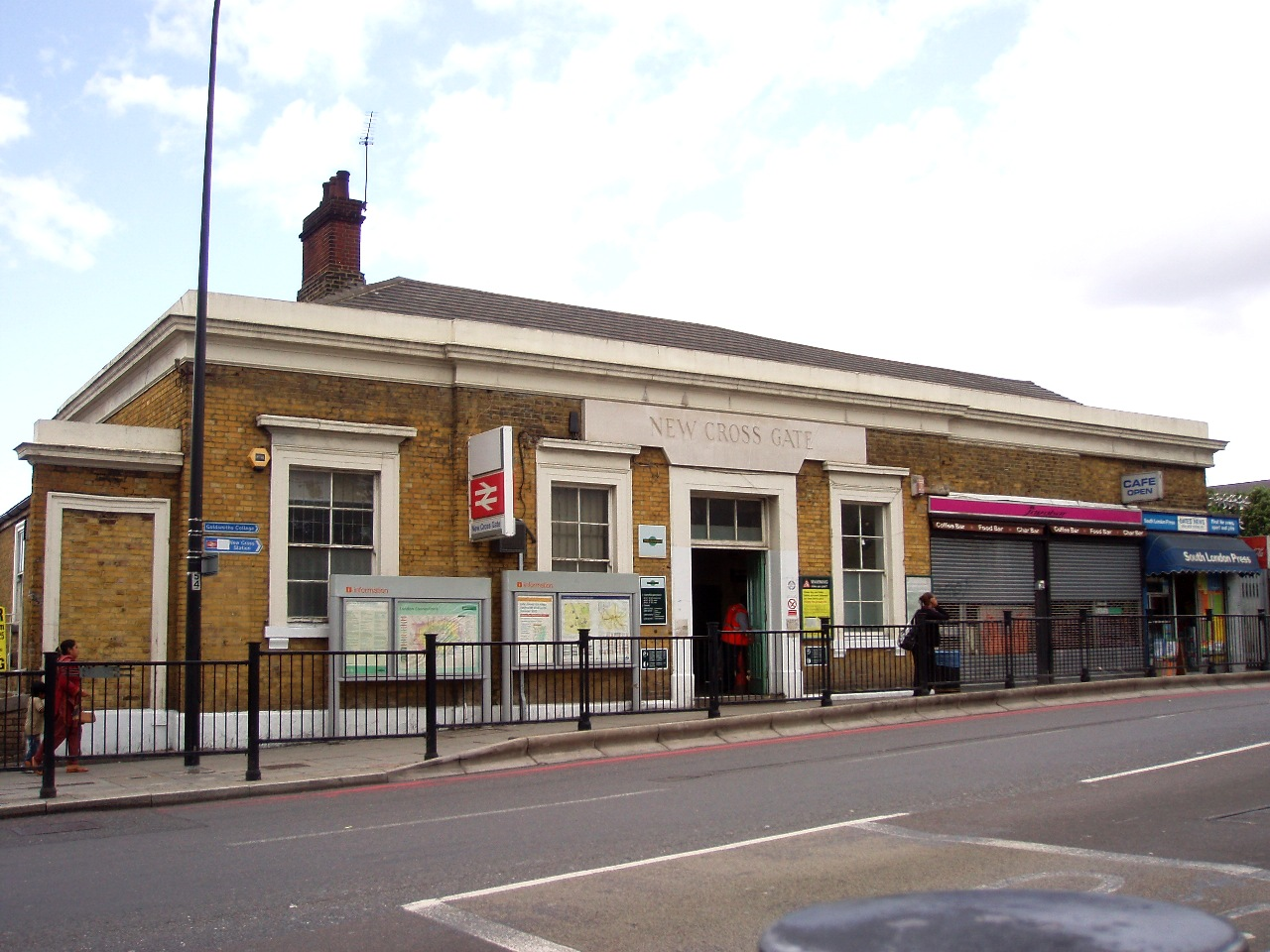
- Station entrance on New Cross Road
- Interactive map of New Cross Gate

General information
- Location: New Cross
- Local authority: London Borough of Lewisham
- Managed by: London Overground
- Owner: Network Rail
- Station code: NXG
- DfT category: C1
- Number of platforms: 5
- Accessible: Yes
- Fare zone: 2
- OSI: New Cross

National Rail annual entry and exit
- 2020–21: ▼1.583 million
- Interchange: ▼89,419
- 2021–22: ▲3.334 million
- Interchange: ▲0.201 million
- 2022–23: ▲4.061 million
- Interchange: ▲1.351 million
- 2023–24: ▲4.662 million
- Interchange: ▼0.123 million
- 2024–25: ▼4.550 million
- Interchange: ▲0.129 million

Key dates
- 5 June 1839: Opened

Other information
- External links: Departures; Facilities
- Coordinates: 51.4755°N 0.0402°W

New Cross Gate is an interchange station between the Windrush line of the London Overground and National Rail services operated by Southern, located in New Cross, London. It is on the Brighton Main Line, 2 miles 70 chains (2.88 miles, 4.63 km) down the line from London Bridge. It is in London fare zone 2.

There is an out-of-station interchange with New Cross station, also on the Windrush line of the London Overground, around 620 m (680 yd) away to the east along the A2 road.

== History ==
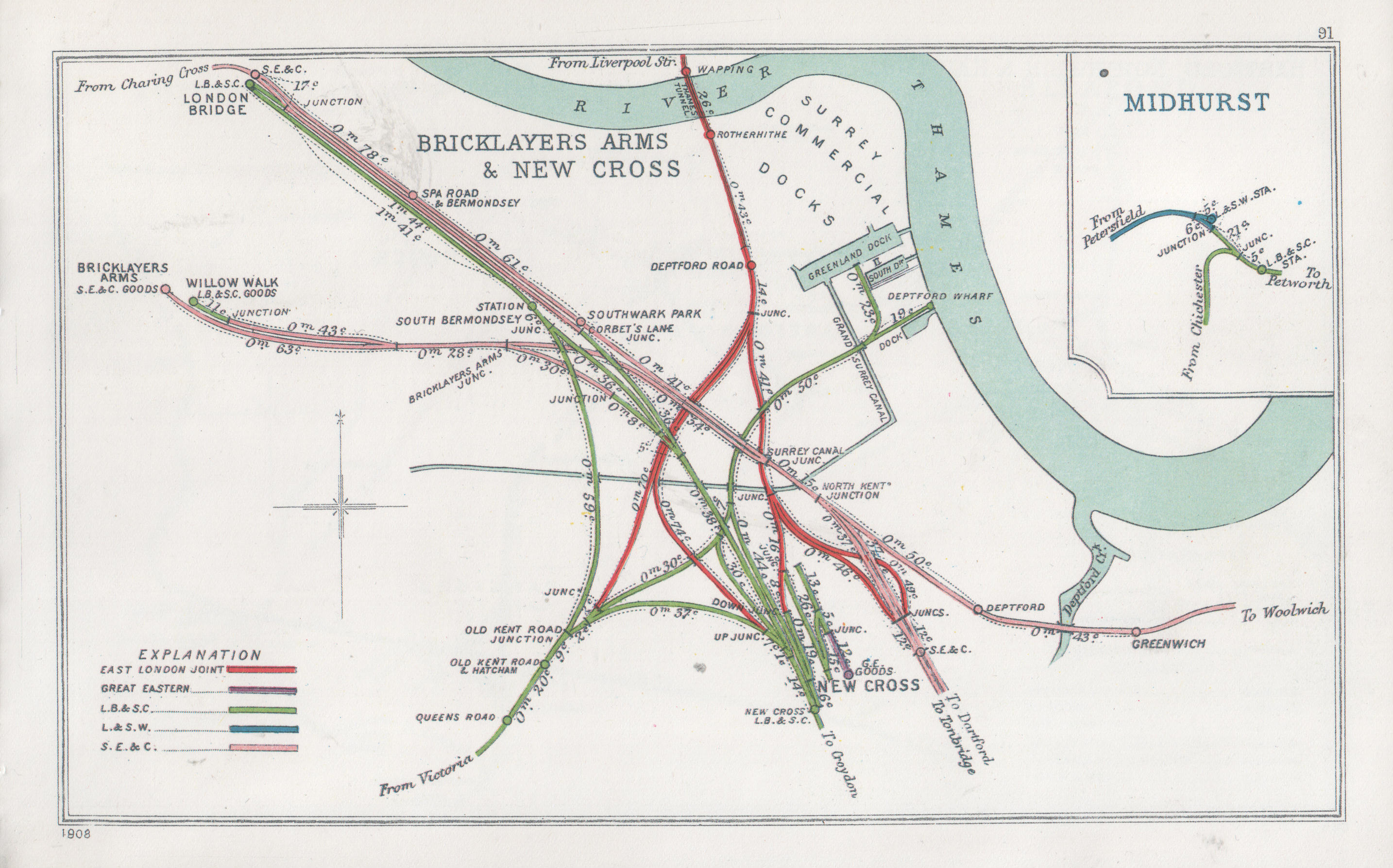
A 1908 Railway Clearing House map of lines around the approaches to London Bridge

England's railway boom of the 1830s led to two competing companies driving lines through the area. The first, the London and Croydon Railway (L&CR), established a station on New Cross Road close to Hatcham in 1839. The second, the South Eastern Railway (SER), established a station near Amersham Way in the heart of New Cross in 1849. After both stations came under the ownership of the Southern Railway on 1 January 1923 the former L&CR station was renamed New Cross Gate on 9 July 1923.

During the 19th century, New Cross (Gate) became an important junction where the South London Line, the East London Line, and the Bricklayers Arms Line diverged from the Brighton Main Line to London Bridge.

=== London and Croydon Railway station ===
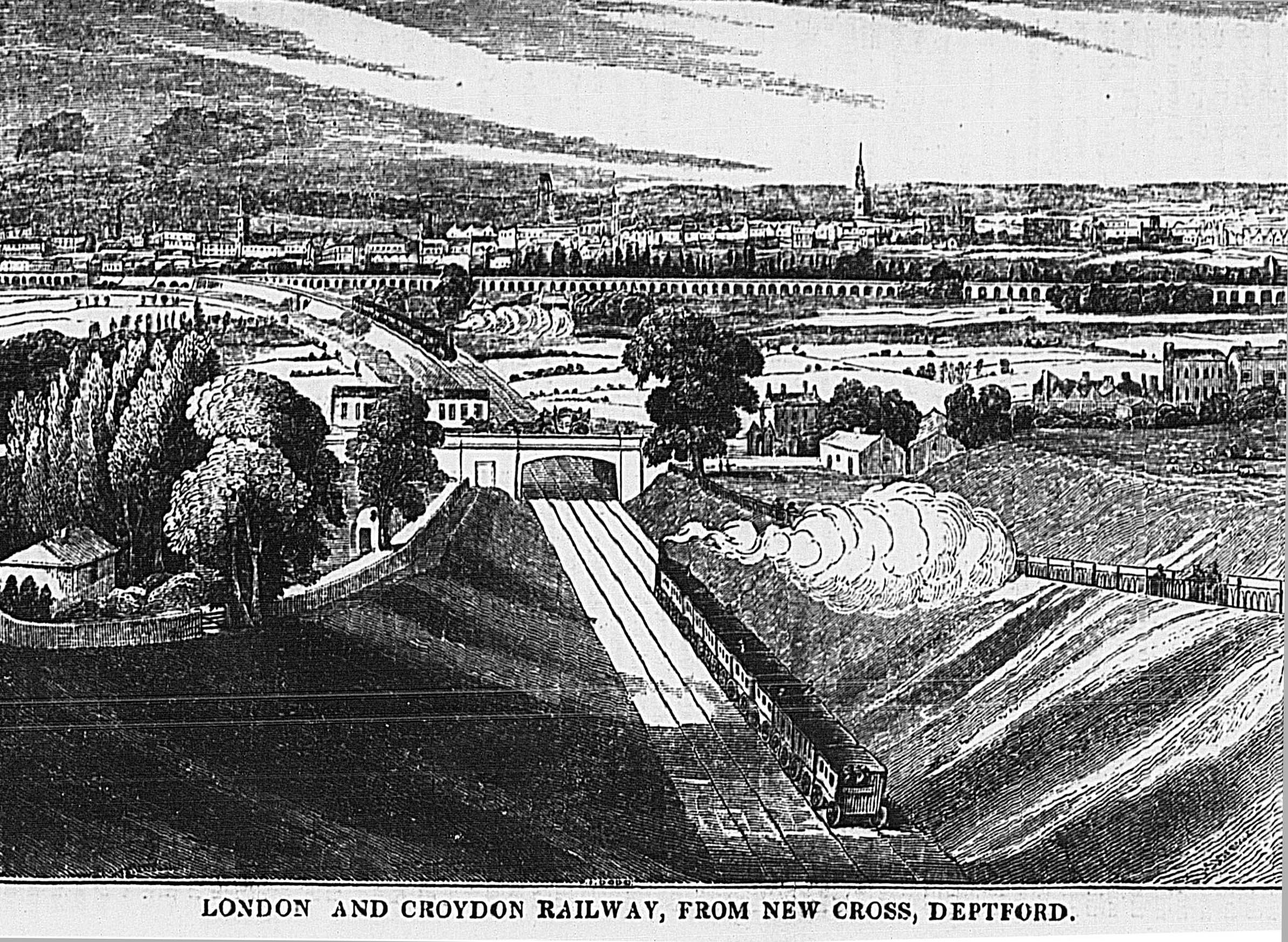
New Cross in 1839. The station is to the left of the road bridge.

The original station was officially opened on 1 June 1839 by the London and Croydon Railway and became fully operational on 5 June 1839. It was intended to become the main freight depot and locomotive workshop for the company. In July 1841 the line (but not the station) was also used by the London and Brighton Railway. The London and Croydon and London and Brighton companies merged to form the London, Brighton and South Coast Railway (LB&SCR) in July 1846. Between February and May 1847 the station at New Cross was the northern terminus of the atmospheric propulsion system introduced by the L&CR, but in the latter month the system was abandoned by the new company.

=== London Brighton and South Coast Railway station ===
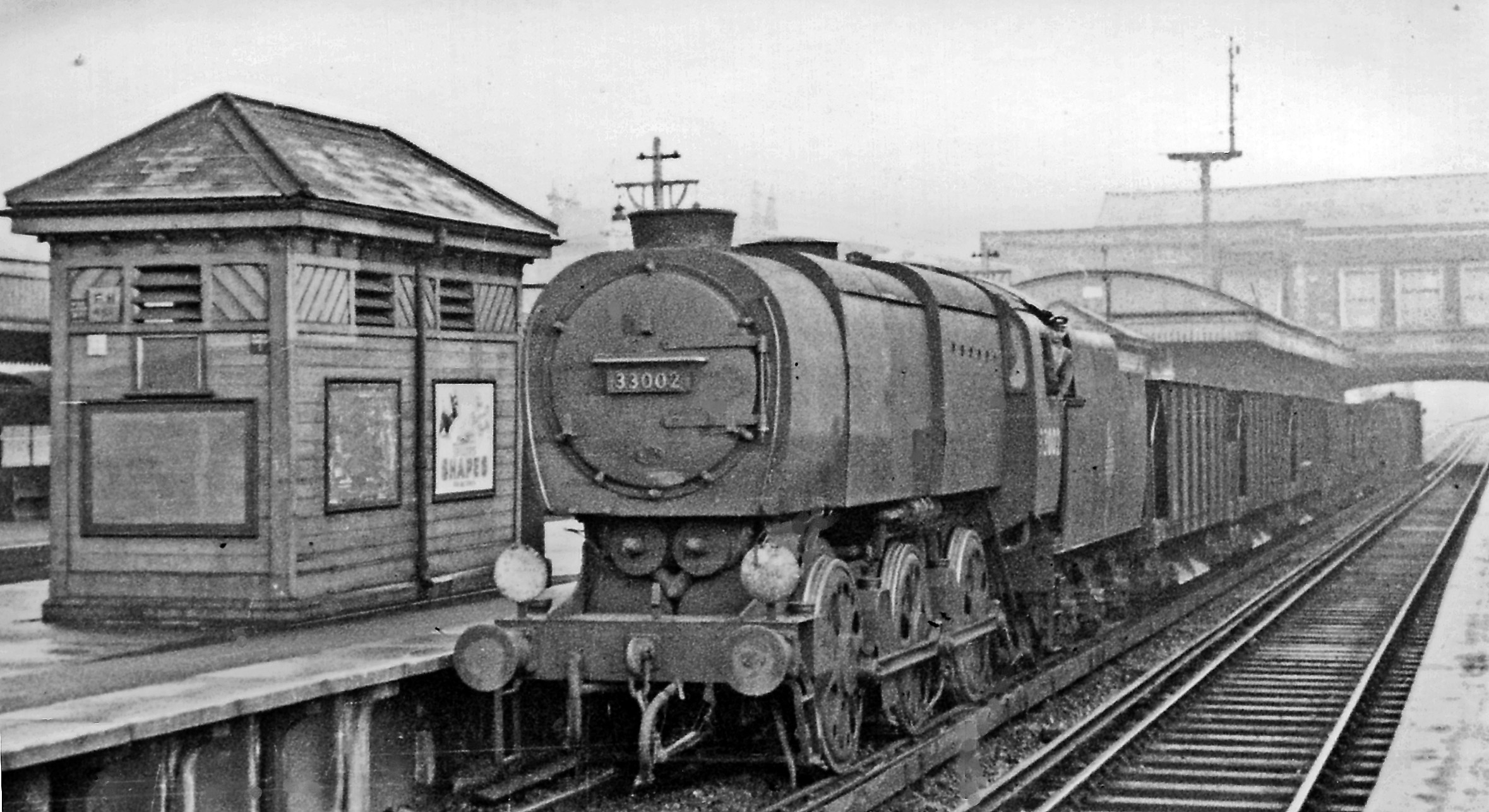
Up empties train on the ex-LB&SC main line in 1951

On 1 October 1847 the newly formed LB&SCR closed the existing New Cross station, replacing it with another at Cold Blow Lane 0.25 miles to the north, in an attempt to secure passengers from the planned North Kent Line of the SER. This move was not a success and was subject to much local criticism, so on 1 May 1849 the LB&SCR rebuilt and re-opened New Cross on the original site.

The current station therefore dates from 1849 but was again rebuilt in 1858 to allow for the quadrupling of the Brighton Main Line. Further rebuilding was undertaken in 1869 when the East London Railway opened a line to Whitechapel and Liverpool Street.

The line through the station was electrified in 1928 by the Southern Railway using the third rail system, although the majority of services continued to be steam hauled until the electrification of the Brighton main line in 1932.

=== East London Railway station ===
On 7 December 1869 a separate station for East London Railway services was opened adjacent to the London, Brighton and South Coast Railway's station. It was closed on 1 September 1886 when services were diverted to the LB&SCR station. Soon after closure the station was demolished and the land used for sidings.

=== East London Railway ===
The East London Railway (ELR) was owned by a consortium of railway companies. Passenger services were operated by the LB&SCR between Croydon and Liverpool Street, and from 1884 by the District Railway between New Cross (Gate) and Shoreditch. LB&SCR services ceased on 31 March 1913, when the line was electrified using the fourth rail system and thereafter all passenger services were operated by the Metropolitan Railway. For the opening of the ELR a separate ELR station was built in 1869 adjacent to the LB&SCR station. It was closed in 1876 and the trains were diverted to the adjacent LB&SCR station. It was reopened in 1884 for additional Metropolitan District Railway services only for it to close two years later. The ELR station was then demolished around 1900 and the site used for sidings.

In 1933 the Metropolitan railway was taken over by the London Passenger Transport Board, which operated services as part of the London Transport Metropolitan line. London Transport was superseded by Transport for London (TfL).

=== Freight yard ===
The London and Croydon planned to use New Cross as the London terminal for its freight traffic, as the station had good access to the Grand Surrey Canal. It therefore built extensive sidings for this purpose. After 1849 the principal freight-handling facility in the area was moved to Willow Walk on the Bricklayers Arms site, but the sidings continued to be used for the storage of carriages. An Ordnance Survey map for 1871 shows a substantial carriage shed on the west side of the main line, north of the station, but this was no longer shown on the 1894 map. It had been replaced by a combined carriage and locomotive shed on the east side of the line in 1894, but this closed in 1906.

Cross-London freight services were operated to the yard by the Great Eastern Railway, which maintained its own goods depot on the site from the 1870s. These services were continued by the London and North Eastern Railway from 1923, and after 1948 by the Eastern Region of British Railways. They ceased to operate in 1962.

=== Locomotive depot and repair workshops ===
The L&CR opened a motive power depot and a locomotive repair facility here in 1839, the former of which appears to have been particularly accident prone. The original building, one of the earliest roundhouses, burned down in 1844. A replacement was built in 1845, and a straight shed built by the LB&SCR in 1848 was blown down in a gale in October 1863. Two further buildings were constructed by the LB&SCR in 1863 and 1869. By 1882, the second (1845) Croydon shed was derelict and in that year was replaced by the new shed, which was rebuilt with a new roof by the Southern Railway (SR) prior to 1929.

The various running sheds began to be run down during the 1930s as part of a re-organisation scheme involving new developments at Norwood Junction, but the onset of war meant that they were not formally closed until 1947 and were used for stabling locomotives until 1951. They were demolished in 1957 together with the repair workshops, and replaced by sidings for the storage of electric multiple units.

The locomotive workshops established by the L&CR continued to undertake minor repairs on locomotives in the London area for the LB&SCR and the SR, and also briefly for British Railways. They were closed in 1949.

=== London Overground ===
The East London line closed on 22 December 2007 and reopened on 27 April 2010 as part of the new London Overground system. The service was also closed between 1995 and 1998 due to repair work on the tunnel under the River Thames. The East London line extension included a flyover north of New Cross Gate allowing trains to run through from West Croydon, plus the construction of a train servicing facility nearby. Platform 1 and adjacent track (southbound) were refurbished, with the line continuing under New Cross Road, before merging with the down slow line. Overground services terminated here until 23 May 2010 when services were extended south. Ticket barriers were installed to all platforms in time for the London Overground services to commence.

=== Bakerloo line extension ===
TfL has proposed future London Underground services at this station as part of the Bakerloo line Extension. Due to financial impacts of the COVID-19 pandemic, work to implement the extension is currently on hold.

== Services ==
New Cross Gate is on the Windrush line of the London Overground, with services operated using Class 378 EMUs. Additional services are operated by Southern using Class 377 EMUs.

The typical off-peak service in trains per hour is:

- 2 tph to London Bridge
- 8 tph to Highbury & Islington via Surrey Quays (Windrush line)
- 2 tph to London Victoria via Streatham Hill
- 4 tph to Crystal Palace (Windrush line)
- 4 tph to West Croydon (Windrush line)

The station is also served by a single early morning and late evening service to East Croydon via Norwood Junction, with the early morning service continuing to Tattenham Corner and Caterham.

Preceding station	National Rail	Following station
London Bridge	Southern Brighton Main Line Stopping Services	Brockley
Preceding station	London Overground	Following station
Surrey Quays towards Highbury & Islington	Windrush line East London line	Brockley towards Crystal Palace or West Croydon
Former services
Preceding station	London Underground	Following station
Deptford Road towards Wimbledon, Richmond, Ealing Broadway or South Harrow	District line (1884–1905)	Terminus
Deptford Road towards Hammersmith	Metropolitan line (1884–1906)	Terminus
Surrey Docks towards Hammersmith	Metropolitan line (1913–39)	Terminus
Surrey Quays towards Shoreditch	East London line (1940–2007)	Terminus
Abandoned plans
Preceding station	London Underground	Following station
Surrey Docks towards Stanmore	Jubilee line Phase 3 (never constructed)	Terminus

== Platform layout ==
The station contains a pair of island platforms and a single side platform:

- Platforms 1 and 2 occupy the eastern island platform
  - Platform 1 is used by Windrush line (London Overground) trains to Crystal Palace and West Croydon
  - Platform 2 is used by stopping Southern trains to London Victoria and Coulsdon Town
- Platforms 3 and 4 occupy the central island platform
  - Platform 3 is used by fast Thameslink and Southern trains towards East Croydon
  - Platform 4 is used by fast Thameslink and Southern trains towards London Bridge
- Platform 5 is a side platform on the western side of the station, and is used by Windrush line (London Overground) trains to Highbury and Islington and stopping Southern trains to London Bridge

Thameslink trains and other Southern services regularly pass through and occasionally stop at the station.

== Connections ==
London Buses routes 21, 53, 136, 171, 172, 177, 321, 436, 453, BL1 and night routes N21, N53, N89, N136 and N171 serve the station.

== Accident ==
- On 7 August 1899 a train hauled by "Terrier" No.59 Cheam collided with "Gladstone" No. 199 Samuel Laing after the driver overran signals approaching the station. Fifteen people were injured.
