= Whitechapel station =

National rail, London Underground and Overground station

Whitechapel
- Bengali: হোয়াইটচ্যাপেল
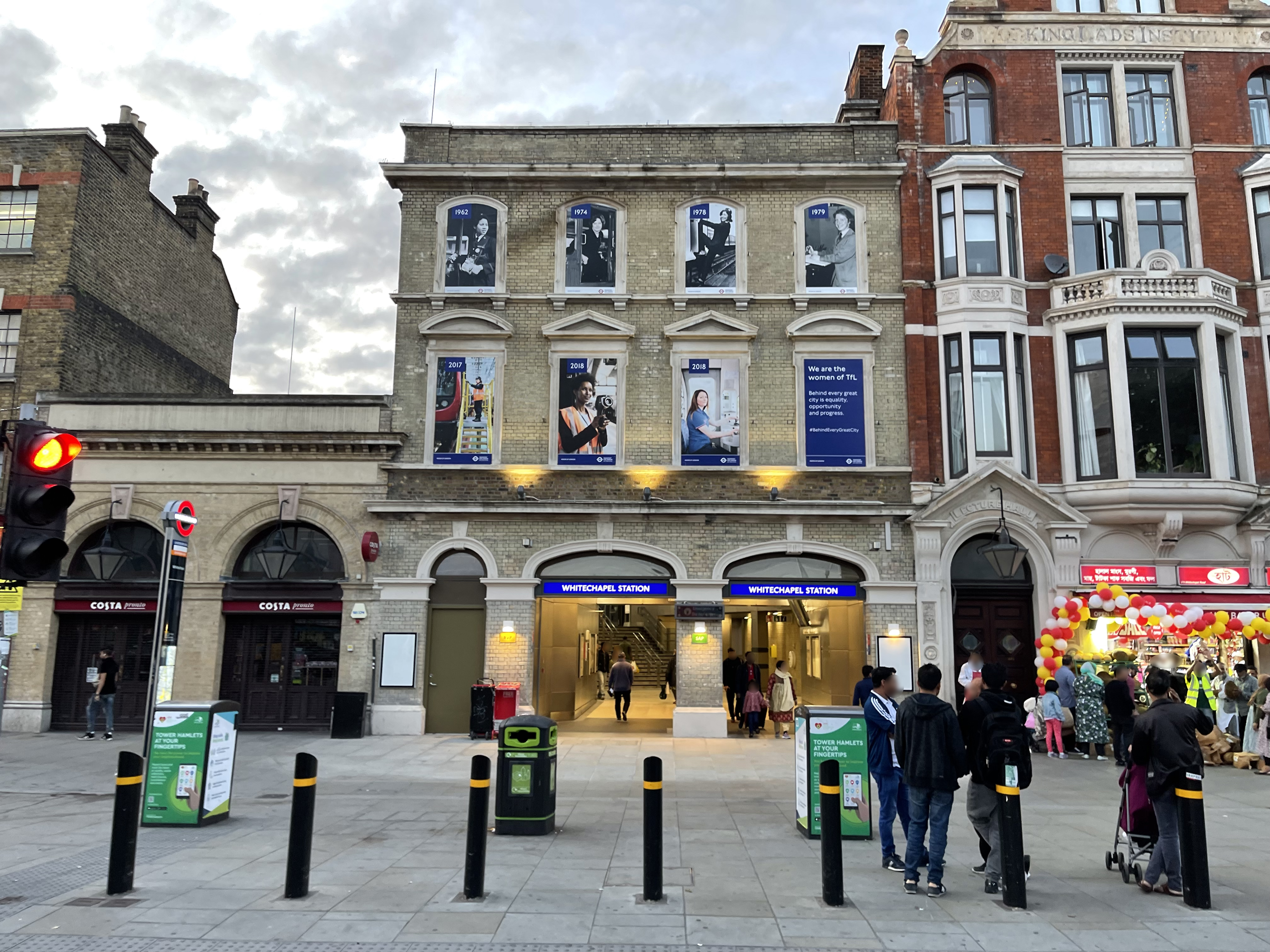
- Renovated entrance building, opened August 2021
- Interactive map of Whitechapel

General information
- Location: Whitechapel
- Local authority: London Borough of Tower Hamlets
- Managed by: London Underground
- Owner: Transport for London
- Station code: ZLW
- Number of platforms: 6
- Accessible: Yes
- Fare zone: 2

London Underground annual entry and exit
- 2021: ▼6.21 million
- 2022: ▲14.27 million
- 2023: ▲17.45 million
- 2024: ▲17.51 million
- 2025: ▲17.89 million

National Rail annual entry and exit
- 2020–21: ▼4.142 million
- 2021–22: ▲9.273 million
- 2022–23: ▲23.307 million
- 2023–24: ▲35.247 million
- 2024–25: ▲37.141 million
- Interchange: 13.770 million

Key dates
- 10 April 1876: Opening of ELR station
- 6 October 1884: Opening of DR station
- 2 June 1902: Rebuilding of DR station
- 1995–1998: East London line closed
- 2007–2010: East London line closed
- 27 April 2010: East London line reopened
- 24 May 2022: Elizabeth line opened

Other information
- External links: TfL station info page; Departures; Facilities
- Coordinates: 51.5195°N 0.0612°W

Whitechapel (Note: Bengali: হোয়াইটচ্যাপেল) is an interchange station in Whitechapel, East London for London Underground, London Overground and Elizabeth line services. The station is located behind a street market of the same name and opposite Tower Hamlets Town Hall. The station was comprehensively rebuilt in the late 2010s and early 2020s as part of the Crossrail project. The station lies between Aldgate East and Stepney Green stations on the District and Hammersmith & City lines of the Underground, and between Shoreditch High Street and Shadwell stations on the Windrush line of the Overground. To the west of Whitechapel, on the Elizabeth line, is Liverpool Street; to the east the line splits, with one branch heading towards Stratford and the other towards Canary Wharf. Whitechapel is in London fare zone 2.

== History ==
The East London Railway (ELR) opened their Whitechapel station on 10 April 1876. It coincided with the extension of the railway north from Wapping to Shoreditch and the extension of London, Brighton and South Coast Railway (LBSCR) services to Liverpool Street and Croydon. (Note: The LBSCR was already running a service between Wapping and Old Kent Road. This was extended to Peckham Rye from 1877.) The South Eastern Railway (SER) started running trains between Liverpool Street and Addiscombe Road on 1 April 1880. SER services ceased to call at the station from 3 March 1884 and were diverted to St Mary's (Whitechapel). The Great Eastern Railway (GER) took over running trains on the ELR from Liverpool Street in 1886. LBSCR trains from the south thereafter terminated at Whitechapel or Shoreditch.

The District Railway (DR) opened their Whitechapel (Mile End) station adjacent to the ELR station on 6 October 1884. It was located at the end of an eastern spur of the Metropolitan and Metropolitan District Joint Railway, a line that connected the eastern end of the District Railway (DR) at Mansion House to the Metropolitan Railway (the Met) at Aldgate and completed the Circle line. (Note: Authorised as the Metropolitan and District (City Lines and Extensions) Railway and also known as the "City Lines".) The station was the eastern terminus for the majority of DR trains. The DR station was renamed Whitechapel on 13 November 1901.

In 1883, the Met jointly sponsored a scheme to connect St Mary's (Whitechapel) station with the London, Tilbury and Southend Railway (LTSR) at Campbell Road in Bromley via underground railway that avoided Whitechapel station. The DR was able to block Met/LTSR through services and the LTSR withdrew from the partnership with the Met. In 1897 the DR revived the Whitechapel and Bow Railway (W&BR), this time with trains running east from their Whitechapel station. Whitechapel DR station was closed for reconstruction on 2 February 1902 and was transferred to W&BR ownership. From 2 June 1902, regular DR steam services were extended to East Ham with some trains going as far as Upminster. In 1904 the DR station entrance and booking hall was closed with all passengers then using the ELR entrance. After fourth-rail electrification of the line, eastbound services terminated at East Ham from 30 September 1905 and Barking from 1 April 1908.

The LTSR had running rights east from Whitechapel and operated a return Whitechapel to Southend steam service on Sundays during the summer of 1905. These were the only LTSR passenger services that operated from Whitechapel. (Note: A regular jointly-operated Ealing Broadway to Southend through service was run daily from 1910 to 1939, with traction west of Barking provided by the DR's electric locomotives.) The Met started terminating trains at the W&B platforms from 3 December 1906. (Note: These services had previously continued onto the ELR east of St Mary's (Whitechapel).) LBSCR services to Peckham Rye and south of New Cross were withdrawn on 30 June 1911. The ELR was fourth-rail electrified and electric service started at Whitechapel on 31 March 1913, with the Met providing trains between Shoreditch and the two New Cross stations. Met service was withdrawn from the W&B platforms.

The eastern section of the District line was very overcrowded by the mid 1930s. In order to relieve this, the Metropolitan line service was extended to Barking. (Note: This was achieved by diverting Metropolitan line trains that had previously been routed onto the East London Line east of Aldgate East.) Whitechapel was served by a single daily Metropolitan line train from Hammersmith from 30 March 1936. This was expanded from 4 May 1936 with a service of eight trains per hour between Barking and Hammersmith at peak times. This was increased to ten trains per hour at Whitechapel from 8 May 1938. (Note: The two extra trains terminated at East Ham.) The Hammersmith service was swapped for longer Uxbridge trains from 17 July 1939, with eight trains an hour at peak times. This service was suspended on 6 October 1941 with Hammersmith trains again running to Barking. On 30 July 1990, the Hammersmith–Barking service of the Metropolitan line gained a separate identity as the Hammersmith & City line. From 13 December 2009, off-peak Hammersmith & City line service was extended from Whitechapel to Barking with a daily all-day service at Whitechapel.

In preparation for the extension of the East London line to Dalston Junction and Highbury & Islington, the line north of Whitechapel to Shoreditch was closed on 9 June 2006. Services to Shoreditch had previously been run during peak hours and Sunday mornings only; these were replaced by a bus link. Work on the extension of the East London line commenced and the line was closed on 22 December 2007. It reopened on 27 April 2010 when tracks on a new alignment were connected to a disused North London line viaduct from Shoreditch to Dalston, making Whitechapel part of the London Overground network. Temporary bus services operated during the closure, of which rail replacement route ELW remained in service until the ELL fully opened on 23 May 2010. The southern extension of phase 1 from New Cross Gate to Crystal Palace and West Croydon was completed simultaneously with that to Dalston in 2010 and a full service began in May 2010.

Owing to Crossrail work that took place at Whitechapel station, Night Overground services initially did not stop at that station until works were complete. From December 2019, Night Overground began to stop additionally at Whitechapel. When opened on 24 May 2022,services initially ran between Paddington and Abbey Wood only. Since 6 November 2022, the line splits into two branches just east of the station: one towards Shenfield, joining the Great Eastern Main Line just south of Stratford, and the other continuing to Abbey Wood The Elizabeth Line platforms lie to the north of the station, with access via escalators down from the intermediate concourse above the Overground tracks.

== Design ==
The station entrance on Whitechapel Road is the original ELR facade from 1876. It is a three-storey building, and was unlike any other ELR station. The retaining walls of the London Overground platforms are also from 1876. The smaller, adjacent DR entrance from 1884 has been used as a retail unit since 1904. The District and Hammersmith & City line platforms are in the space that was occupied by the 1902 Cuthbert Arthur Brereton-designed W&BR station. This consisted of two island platforms with four platform faces. The earlier 1884 two-platform station had been built in a wide cutting.

In the 2010s and early 2020s, the station was comprehensively rebuilt as part of the Crossrail project to a design by architects Building Design Partnership and Arcadis. The work was undertaken by a joint venture of Balfour Beatty, Morgan Sindall and Taylor Woodrow Construction. The work involved restoring the historic station entrance, building a new station concourse and ticket hall above the Underground and Overground tracks, widening the sub-surface line platforms, and providing an intermediate concourse above the Overground tracks – as well as platforms and other infrastructure for Elizabeth line services. Ten lifts provide step free access to all platforms, with three escalators providing access down to the Elizabeth line platforms. A new north-south, free public access route through the station is also provided, shortening journeys for local residents. The revamped original entrance reopened on 23 August 2021. Originally forecast in the early 2010s to cost £110m, the work at Whitechapel is estimated to have cost around £830m. Crossrail CEO Mark Wild stated that Whitechapel was “one of the most challenging Elizabeth Line stations to construct”, with challenges including building the new concourse above live railway lines, as well as ensuring continued use of the station by passengers. A temporary ticket hall off Court Street maintained access into the station during the 5 year period that the main entrance was closed.

=== Artwork ===
In 1997, vitreous enamel panels designed by Doug Patterson were installed on the East London line (now part of the London Overground) platforms. On the Elizabeth line platforms, colourful paper collages of local residents by Chantal Joffe have been recreated in aluminium. This work is titled "A Sunday afternoon in Whitechapel". The Crossrail ventilation shaft on Durward Street behind the station is decorated with dots in a pattern of a bell peel, referencing the nearby Whitechapel Bell Foundry.

=== Bilingual signage ===
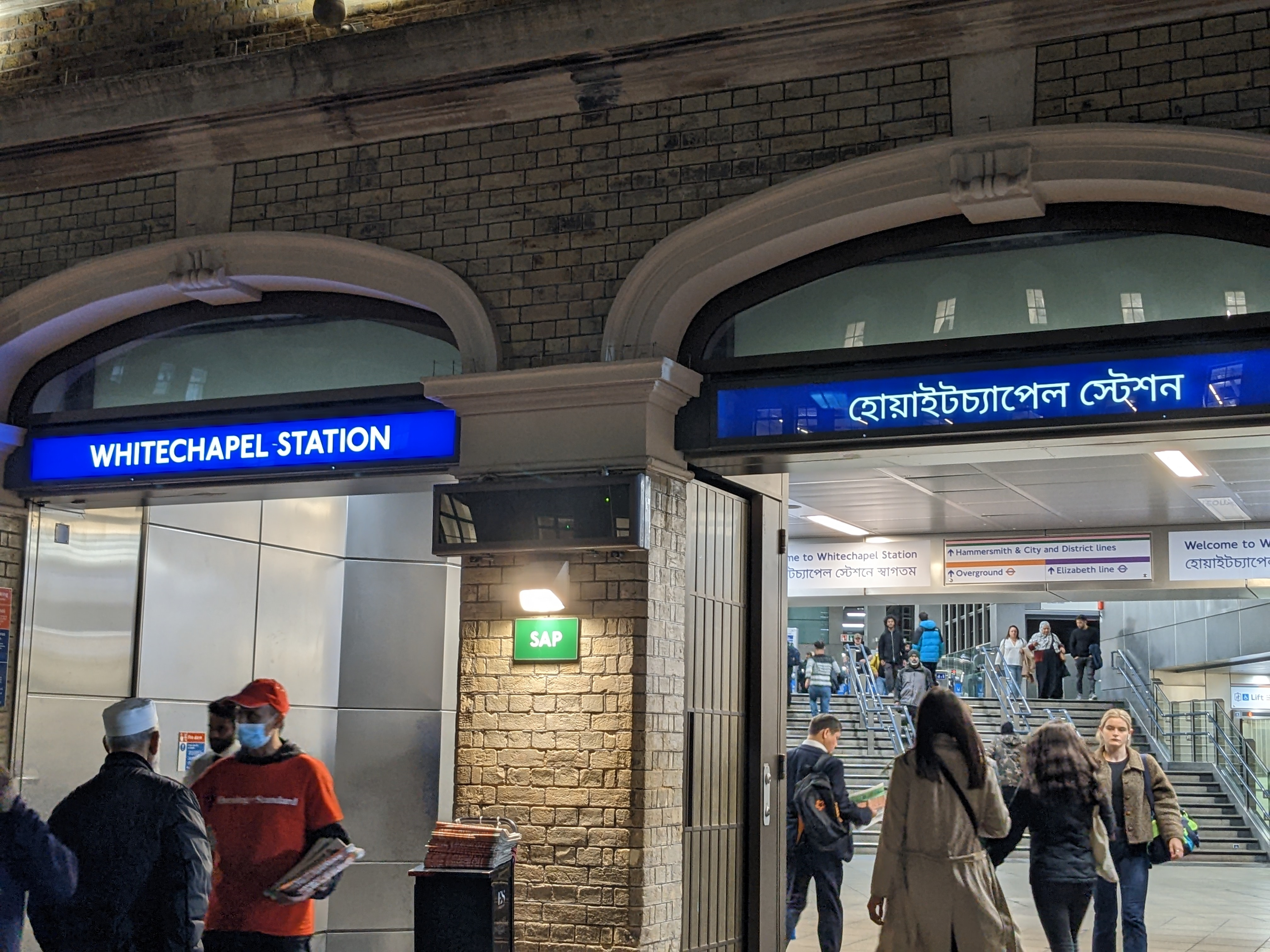
Bengali signage in the station

Whitechapel station has bilingual station signage, owing to the large Bengali community in the local area. In March 2022, station signs on the platforms bear "Whitechapel" and its equivalent "হোয়াইটচ্যাপেল" in Bengali. It is one of the relatively few stations in England to have bilingual signage. (Note: Others are Southall (Punjabi), Wallsend (Latin), Hereford (Welsh), Moreton-in-Marsh (Japanese), Bicester Village (Mandarin and Arabic) and St Pancras International, Ebbsfleet International and Ashford International (all French).) Mayor of London Sadiq Khan stated that he was "delighted" that the signage was installed ahead of Bangladesh Independence Day on 26 March. The installation was supported by Bangladeshi diplomats and Mamata Banerjee, the Chief Minister of West Bengal, India. However, it has also faced opposition, such as from Susan Hall, the former Conservative mayoral candidate in 2024; critics argue that Bengali is not an official language of the United Kingdom, and that station signs should be limited to native languages.

== Location ==
The station is located on Whitechapel Road in the Whitechapel neighbourhood of the London Borough of Tower Hamlets. It is served by London Buses routes 25, 205, 254, D3 and night routes N25, N205 and N253.

== Services ==
Services at Whitechapel are operated by the Elizabeth line; the Windrush line of the London Overground; and the District and Hammersmith & City lines of the London Underground.

The typical off-peak service in trains per hour (tph) is:

Operator/line	Frequency to destination
London Underground; District line	Eastbound; 3 tph to Barking; 12 tph to Upminster
London Underground; District line	Westbound; 3 tph to Wimbledon; 6 tph to Richmond; 6 tph to Ealing Broadway
London Underground; Hammersmith & City line	Eastbound; 6 tph to Barking
London Underground; Hammersmith & City line	Westbound; 6 tph to Hammersmith
London Overground; Windrush line	Northbound; 8 tph to Dalston Junction; 8 tph to Highbury & Islington
London Overground; Windrush line	Southbound; 4 tph to New Cross; 4 tph to Crystal Palace; 4 tph to West Croydon; 4 tph to Clapham Junction
Elizabeth line	Eastbound; 8 tph to Abbey Wood; 8 tph to Shenfield
Elizabeth line	Westbound; 6 tph to London Paddington; 4 tph to Heathrow Terminal 4; 2 tph to Heathrow Terminal 5; 2 tph to Maidenhead; 2 tph to Reading

With 17.89 million entries and exits in 2025, it was ranked the 29th busiest London Underground station.

Preceding station	London Underground	Following station
Aldgate East towards Wimbledon, Richmond or Ealing Broadway	District line	Stepney Green towards Upminster
Aldgate East towards Hammersmith	Hammersmith & City line	Stepney Green towards Barking
Preceding station	Elizabeth line	Following station
Liverpool Street towards Paddington	Elizabeth line	Stratford towards Shenfield
Liverpool Street towards Reading or Heathrow Airport Terminal 4 or Terminal 5	Elizabeth line	Canary Wharf towards Abbey Wood
Preceding station	London Overground	Following station
Shoreditch High Street towards Dalston Junction or Highbury & Islington	Windrush line East London line and South London line	Shadwell towards Clapham Junction, Battersea Park, Crystal Palace, New Cross or West Croydon
Former services
Preceding station	London Underground	Following station
St Mary's (Whitechapel Road) towards Hammersmith	Metropolitan line Hammersmith branch (1906–1913)	Terminus
St Mary's (Whitechapel Road) towards Hammersmith	Metropolitan line Hammersmith branch (1936–1938)	Stepney Green towards Barking
St Mary's (Whitechapel Road) towards Wimbledon, Richmond or Ealing Broadway	District line (1884–1938)	Stepney Green towards Upminster
Shoreditch Terminus	East London line (1913–2006)	Shadwell towards New Cross or New Cross Gate
Terminus	East London line (2006–2007)	Shadwell towards New Cross or New Cross Gate
