= East London line =

Railway line in London

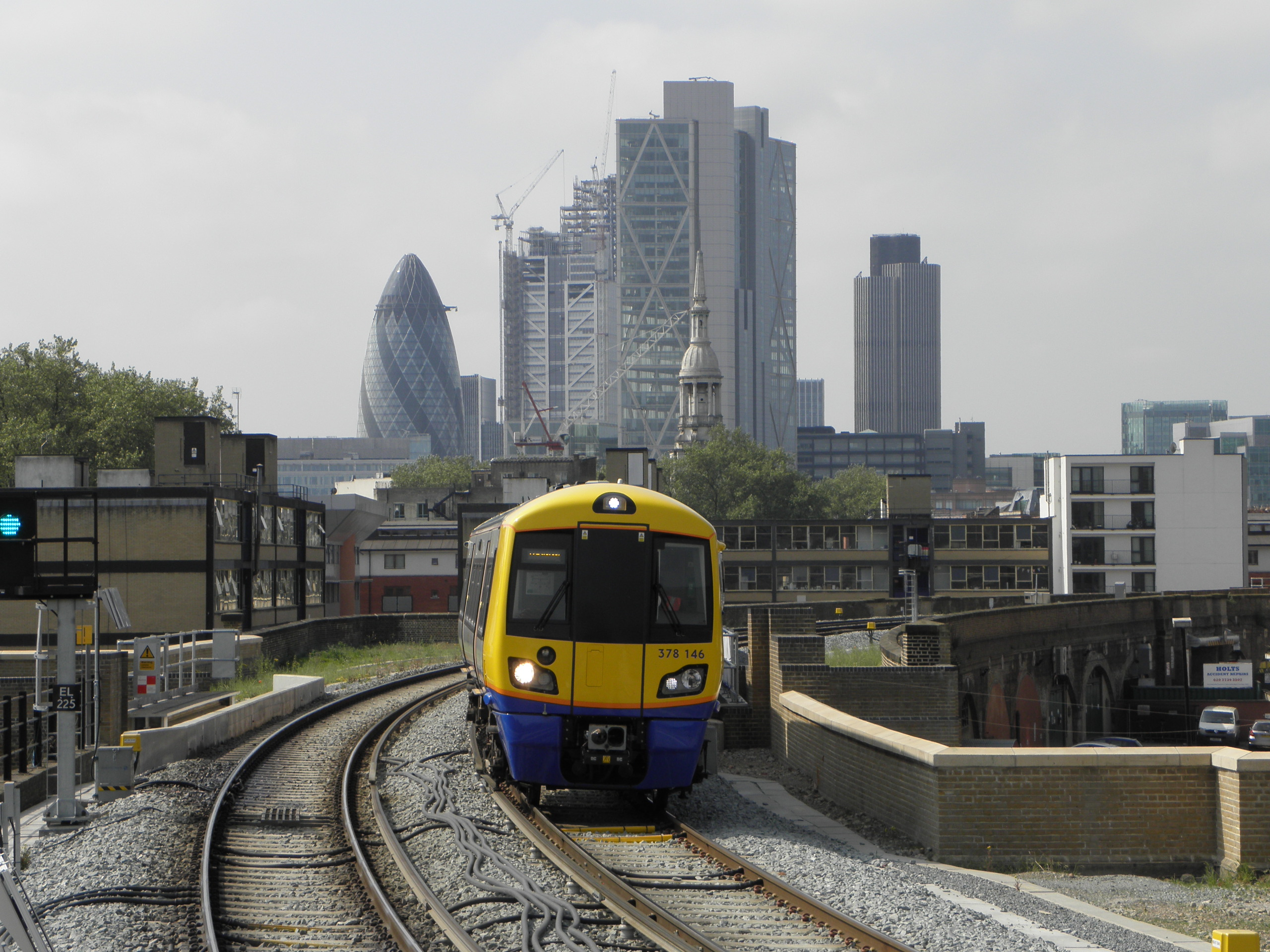
- Class 378 train at Hoxton in 2010, with the City of London skyline in background

Overview
- Status: Operational
- Owner: Transport for London (TfL); Network Rail
- Locale: Greater London
- Termini: Highbury & Islington Dalston Junction; New Cross Crystal Palace West Croydon Battersea Park
- Stations: 23

Service
- Type: Suburban rail, Rapid Transit
- System: National Rail
- Services: 3
- Operator: London Overground
- Depot: New Cross Gate
- Rolling stock: Class 378 "Capitalstar"

History
- Opened: 1933 to 2007 (As East London Line); 27 April 2010 (preview service); 23 May 2010 (full service)

Technical
- Number of tracks: Double track; sections with four tracks
- Track gauge: 1,435 mm (4 ft 8 1/2 in) standard gauge
- Electrification: 750 V DC third rail
Route map
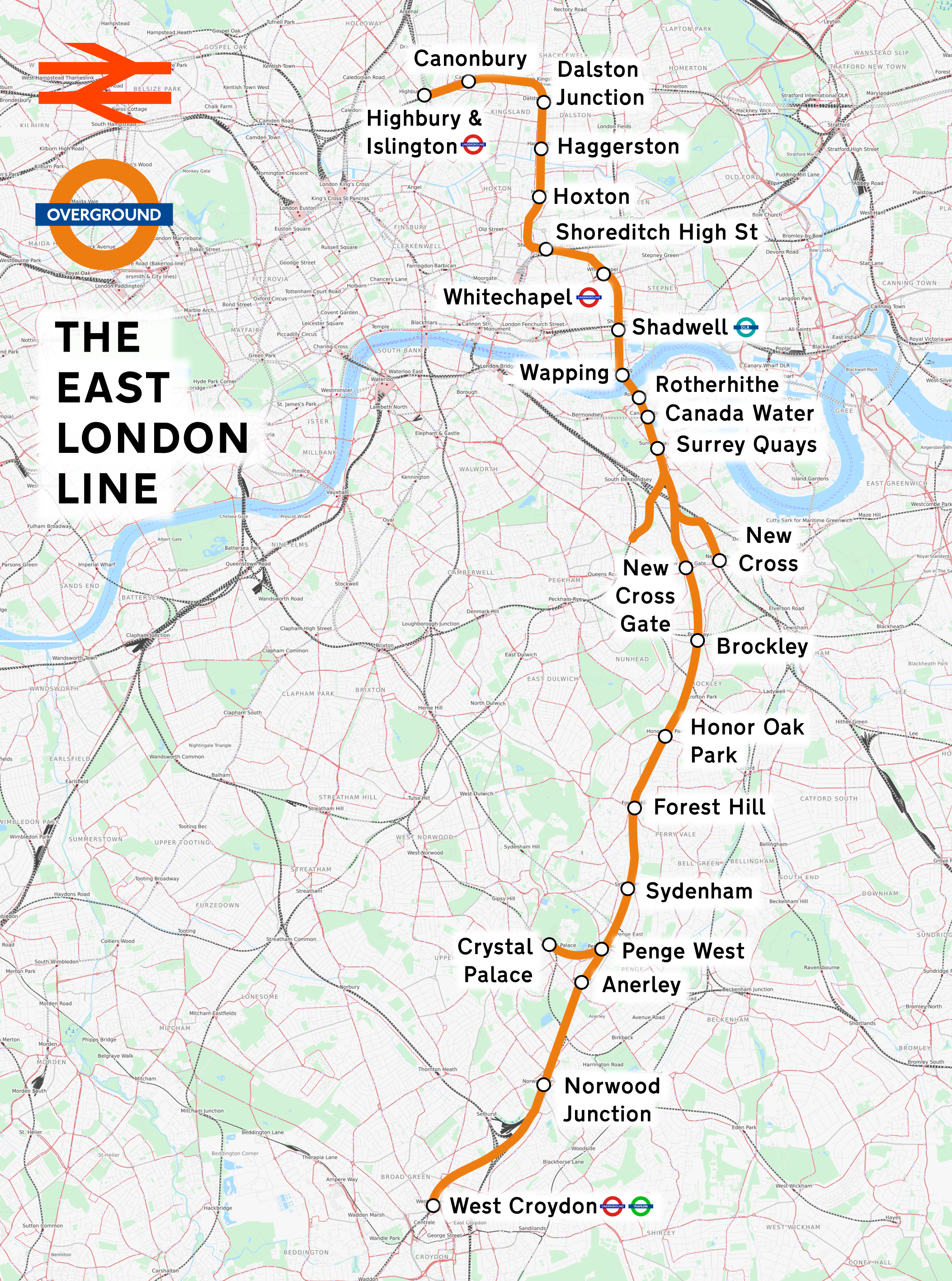
(Click to expand)

The East London line is a railway line running north to south through the East, Docklands and South areas of London. It is currently used by London Overground services and was previously a line of the London Underground.

Built in 1869 by the East London Railway Company, which reused the Thames Tunnel intended for horse-drawn carriages, the line became part of the London Underground network in 1933. After nearly 75 years as part of that network, it closed on 22 December 2007 for an extensive refurbishment and expansion, reopening as part of the Overground network in April 2010. Phase 2, which links the line to the South London line with a terminus at Clapham Junction, opened on 9 December 2012, creating an orbital railway around inner London.

In 2024, London Overground services on the East and South London lines were rebranded the Windrush line.

== History ==
=== Establishment of the East London Railway ===
East London Railway Act 1865
- Act of Parliament
- Parliament of the United Kingdom
- Long title: An Act for the Construction of Railways to connect, by means of the Thames Tunnel, certain Railways on the Surrey Side of the River Thames with certain Railways on the Middlesex Side of the said River, to be called "The East London Railway;" and for other Purposes.
- Citation: 28 & 29 Vict. c. li

Dates
- Royal assent: 26 May 1865

The East London Railway (ELR) was created by the East London Railway Company, a consortium of six railway companies: the Great Eastern Railway (GER), the London, Brighton and South Coast Railway (LB&SCR), the London, Chatham and Dover Railway (LCDR), the South Eastern Railway (SER), the Metropolitan Railway, and the District Railway. The latter two operated what are now the Metropolitan, Circle, District and Hammersmith & City lines of the London Underground. The incorporation of the East London Railway took place with the passing of the East London Railway Act 1865 (28 & 29 Vict. c. li) on 26 May 1865 with the aim of providing a link between the LB&SCR, GER and SER lines.

The companies reused the Thames Tunnel, built by Marc and Isambard Kingdom Brunel between 1825 and 1843 for horse-drawn carriages. The tunnel, with generous headroom and two carriageways separated by arches, connected Wapping on the north bank of the Thames with Rotherhithe on the south bank. A triumph of civil engineering, it was a commercial failure and by the 1860s it had become an unpleasant and disreputable place.

The tunnel was the most easterly land connection between the north and south banks of the Thames, close to the docks on both banks of the river, and was not far from mainline railways at either end. Converting the tunnel for railway use thus offered a means of providing a cross-Thames rail link. On 25 September 1865 the East London Railway Company took ownership of the tunnel at a cost of £800,000. Over the next four years the company built a railway through the tunnel to connect with the existing lines. The company's engineer was Sir John Hawkshaw, who was also responsible for the major re-design and completion of I K Brunel's long-abandoned Clifton Suspension Bridge at Bristol. The section of the railway construction work from Wapping to Bishopsgate, which was very difficult, was carried out by the firm "T. & C. Walker and Co." (Thomas Andrew Walker and his younger brother Charles).

The line opened in stages as financing became available:

- 7 December 1869: New Cross Gate (then New Cross) to Wapping opened, operated by the London, Brighton and South Coast Railway (LB&SCR), with intermediate stations at Deptford Road (now Surrey Quays) and Rotherhithe.
- 13 March 1871: A spur opened from just south of what is now Surrey Quays station to the South London line's Old Kent Road station. Passenger services were withdrawn from 1 June 1911 and freight last used the line in 1964; the track was subsequently removed. This alignment was relaid and restored to passenger service by London Overground in late 2012.
- 10 April 1876: Wapping to Shoreditch, through a cut-and-cover tunnel constructed in part along the bottom of an infilled dock. At Shoreditch a connection was made with the Great Eastern Railway to Liverpool Street. Intermediate stations were at Shadwell and Whitechapel.
- 1 April 1880: A spur to New Cross (South Eastern Railway) opened.
- 3 March 1884: A spur to the Metropolitan and Metropolitan District Railways opened south of Whitechapel using St Mary's Curve. This enabled Metropolitan Railway and Metropolitan District Railway (District) trains to commence through services to the East London Railway later that year. Although passenger services via this spur ceased in 1939, it was retained to transfer empty trains to the rest of the sub-surface network.

=== Early use ===
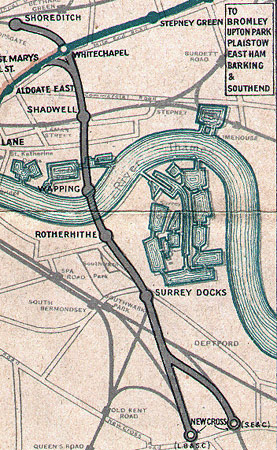
Map of the East London Railway in 1915

The East London Railway Company owned the infrastructure but it was operated by its controlling railways. Steam trains were initially operated by the GER, LB&SCR and the SER. The LB&SCR used its LBSCR A1 Class Terrier locomotives, which William Stroudley designed partly with this line in mind. It carried both passenger and goods trains; the LB&SCR operated between Liverpool Street and Croydon, the SER running between Addiscombe and Liverpool Street from April 1880 until March 1884. From March to September 1884 the SER service ran from Addiscombe to St Mary's (MR & MDR Joint Station). Metropolitan Railway services from St Mary's to New Cross (SER) and Metropolitan District Railway services from St Mary's to New Cross Gate (LB&SCR) commenced on 1 October 1884. On 6 October through services started from Hammersmith (Hammersmith & City) to New Cross (SER) and from Hammersmith (MDR) to New Cross (LB&SCR).

East London Railway (Various Powers) Act 1868
- Act of Parliament
- Parliament of the United Kingdom
- Long title: An Act to confer further Powers on the East London Railway Company for the Execution of Works, and otherwise with reference to their Undertaking; and for other Purposes.
- Citation: 31 & 32 Vict. c. clxiii

Dates
- Royal assent: 31 July 1868

East London Railway Act 1871
- Act of Parliament
- Parliament of the United Kingdom
- Long title: An Act for enabling the East London Railway Company to abandon parts, and to alter the levels of other parts, of their authorised Railways; and for other purposes.
- Citation: 34 & 35 Vict. c. cl

Dates
- Royal assent: 24 July 1871

Text of statute as originally enacted

East London Railway Act 1876
- Act of Parliament
- Parliament of the United Kingdom
- Long title: An Act to enable the East London Railway Company to make a New Junction with the Main Line of the Great Eastern Railway Company; and for other purposes.
- Citation: 39 & 40 Vict. c. lii

Dates
- Royal assent: 27 June 1876

Text of statute as originally enacted

East London Railway Act 1877
- Act of Parliament
- Parliament of the United Kingdom
- Long title: An Act to enable the East London Railway Company to raise further Capital, and to make further provision with respect to their authorised Junction with the Main Line of the Great Eastern Railway; and for other purposes.
- Citation: 40 & 41 Vict. c. clvi

Dates
- Royal assent: 2 August 1877

Text of statute as originally enacted

Before the development of the Kent coalfields in the early part of the 20th century, house coal from the north for distribution in south London and as far afield as Maidstone and Brighton was an important source of revenue. Access at the north end of the line was difficult: trains were limited to 26 wagons and had to be shunted into the Great Eastern's Liverpool Street station and drawn forward onto the ELR. To avoid this reversal, a line was planned from the ELR north of Whitechapel to the GER at Bethnal Green. Acts for this were passed: the East London Railway (Additional Powers) Act 1866 (29 & 30 Vict. c. clxxx) and the East London Railway (Various Powers) Act 1868 (31 & 32 Vict. c. clxiii). When the GER route to Hackney Downs Junction, now Hackney Downs, was constructed in 1872, the route was altered to connect at Cambridge Heath, with the East London Railway Act 1871 (34 & 35 Vict. c. cl) as an abandonment act for the previous route, and two new acts the East London Railway Act 1876 (39 & 40 Vict. c. lii) and the East London Railway Act 1877 (40 & 41 Vict. c. clvi). A short length of the latter tunnel was built, and from October 1900 additional capacity was offered by a wagon lift, carrying two ten-ton wagons, from the Great Eastern coal depot at Spitalfields to a siding laid in the tunnel stub. The surface junction was taken up in 1966 and the lift closed in 1967, after a fire at the Spitalfields depot.

When the Metropolitan District Railway was electrified in 1905 it ceased using the ELR, the last trains running on 31 July 1905; the Metropolitan Railway suspended its service after 2 December 1906. LB&SCR and GER services continued, and SER services recommenced on 3 December 1906.

The line was electrified, with the controlling railways funding the upgrade and the Metropolitan Railway providing the rolling stock. Electric services began on 31 March 1913 and ran from the two southern termini to Shoreditch and South Kensington via Edgware Road and High Street Kensington. In 1914 the service to South Kensington was diverted to Hammersmith, on what is now the Hammersmith & City line.

Southern Railway Act 1925
- Act of Parliament
- Parliament of the United Kingdom
- Long title: An Act to empower the Southern Railway Company to construct works and acquire lands to extend the time for the completion of certain works and for the compulsory purchase of certain lands to abandon certain authorised works to transfer to the said Company the undertaking of the East London Railway Company and for other purposes.
- Citation: 15 & 16 Geo. 5. c. l

Dates
- Royal assent: 31 July 1925

Text of statute as originally enacted

After the 1923 grouping the goods service was operated by London and North Eastern Railway (as successors to the GER), with the Metropolitan Railway continuing to provide passenger services. Ownership was transferred to the Southern Railway by the Southern Railway Act 1925 (15 & 16 Geo. 5. c. l), but the railway continued to be leased to the East London Railway Joint Committee, now comprising the Southern Railway (47.5%), the LNER (17.5%), the Metropolitan Railway (17.5%), and the District Railway (17.5%).

=== London Underground era ===
East London line

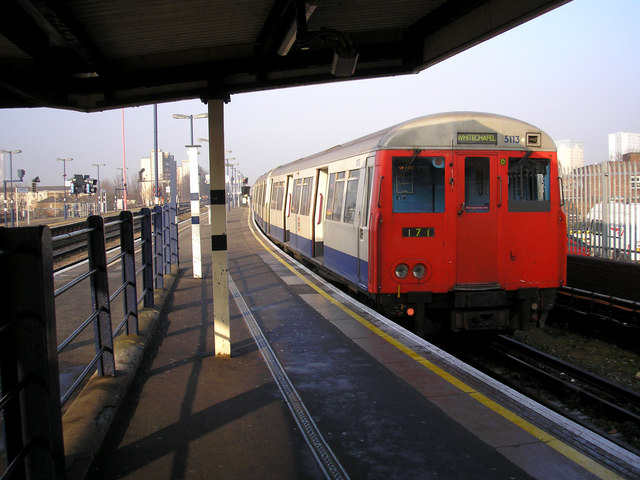
- A London Underground A60 Stock train at New Cross station in 2007

Overview
- Owner: Transport for London
- Stations: 8 (9 until 2006)
- Colour on map: Dark orange

Service
- Type: Sub-surface
- System: London Underground
- Depot(s): New Cross; Neasden
- Rolling stock: A Stock
- Ridership: 10,702,000 passenger journeys

History
- Opened: 1869
- Closed: 2007

Technical
- Line length: 4.6 mi (7.4 km)
Transport for London rail lines
London Underground
Bakerloo
Central
Circle
District
Hammersmith & City
Jubilee
Metropolitan
Northern
Piccadilly
Victoria
Waterloo & City
London Overground
Liberty
Lioness
Mildmay
Suffragette
Weaver
Windrush
Other TfL Modes
DLR
Elizabeth line
London Trams

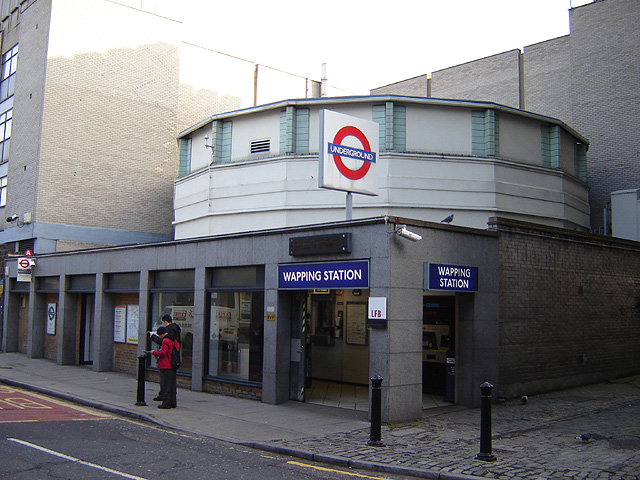
Wapping station on the East London line, built into the original northern entrance shaft of the Thames Tunnel. The station was rebuilt in the early 1980s.

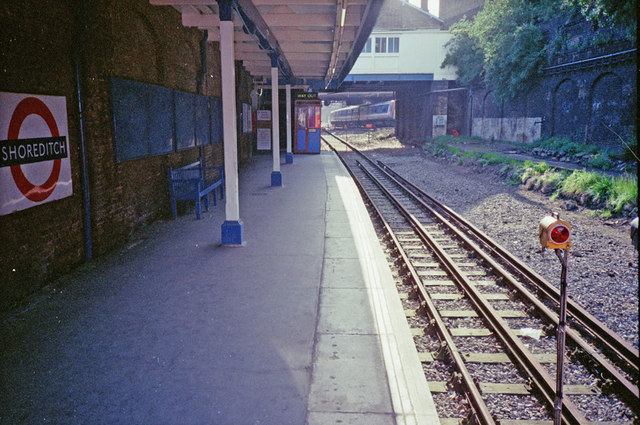
The link to Liverpool Street, 1991

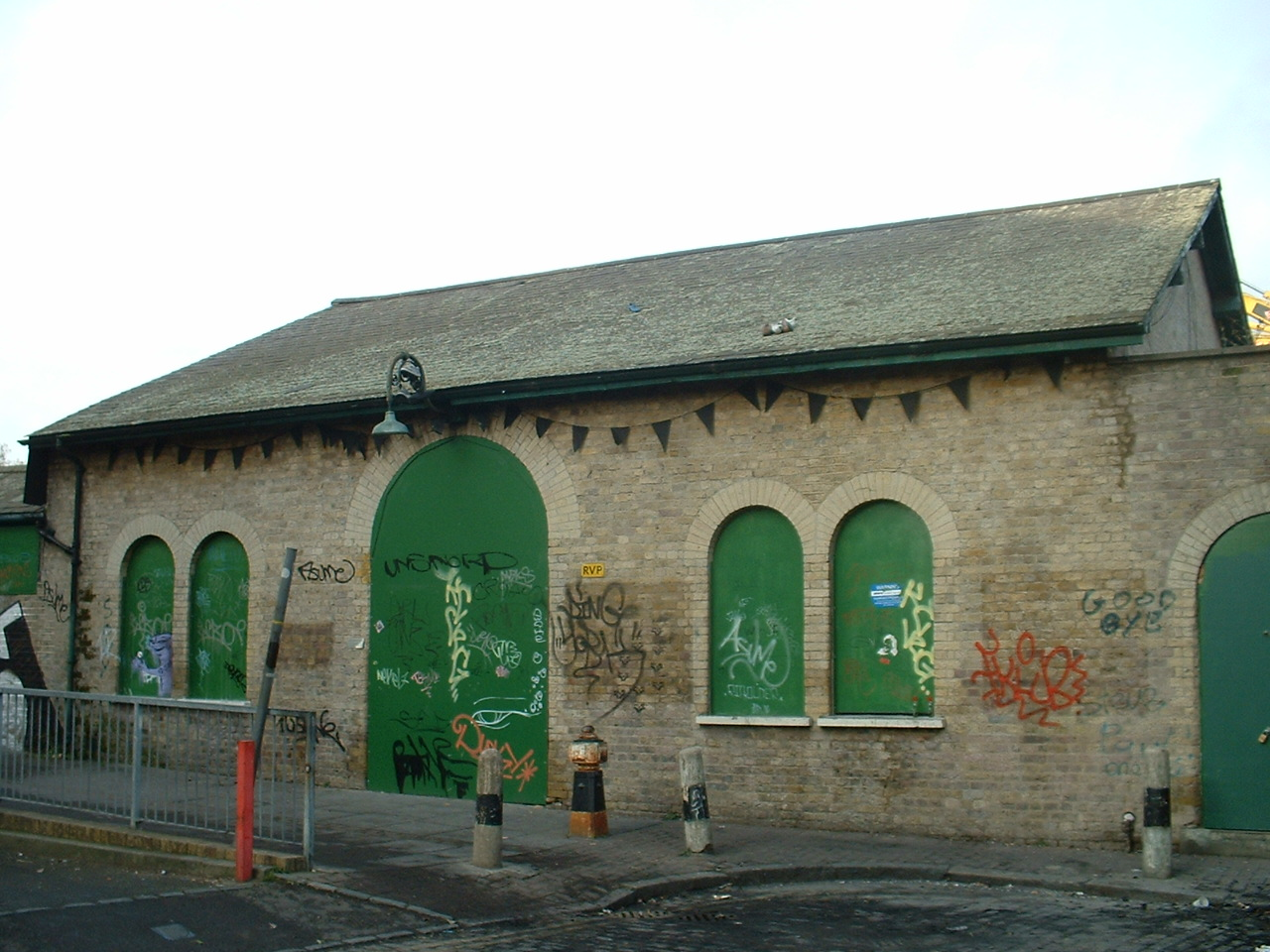
A dilapidated and graffitied Shoreditch Underground station in December 2007. It closed on 9 June 2006, after 93 years of Underground service.

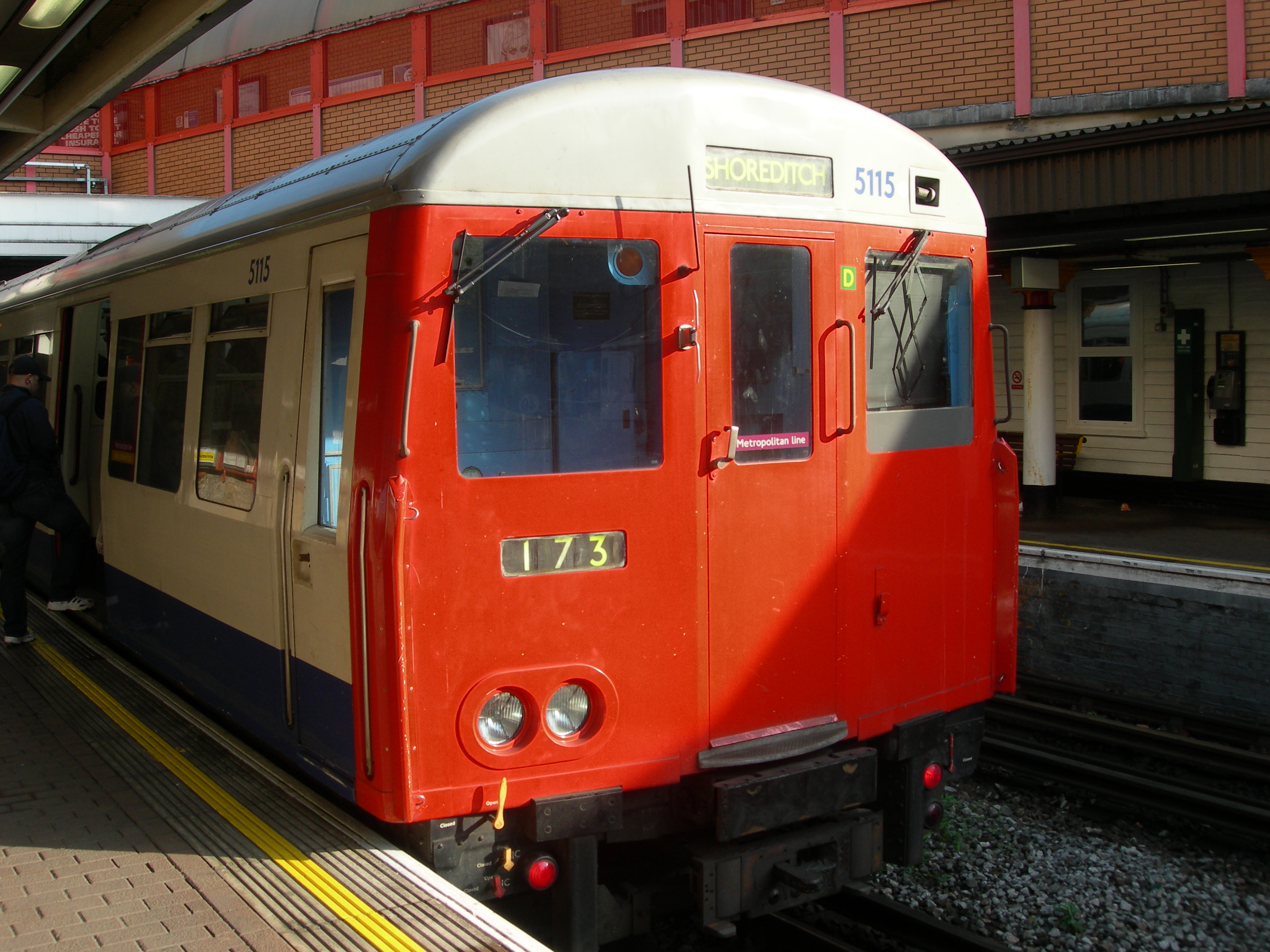
A train of A stock stands at Surrey Quays

In 1933, the East London Railway came under the control of the London Passenger Transport Board. Although the infrastructure was still privately owned, passenger services were operated as the "East London Branch" of the Metropolitan line. The railways were nationalised in 1948, and became part of the British Transport Commission along with the Underground. Goods services continued to use the line until 1962, with occasional passenger trains from Liverpool Street until 1966. The short length of track connecting Shoreditch to Liverpool St was removed in 1966. The service to Shoreditch was reduced, with Whitechapel becoming the northern terminus for much of the time; by the time Shoreditch station closed in 2006, it was only open at peak times on weekdays and most of Sundays (for Brick Lane Market).

Services to and from stations further west were curtailed during the early part of the Underground era. The service to Hammersmith was reduced to peak hours only in 1936 and withdrawn in 1939, leaving the East London branch as an isolated line. Until 1999, its only passenger interchange to the rest of the Underground was at Whitechapel, with interchanges to main line trains at the two New Cross stations. In the 1980s and 1990s, the line gained two important new connections: Shadwell became an interchange with the Docklands Light Railway in 1987, and a station was added at Canada Water in 1999 for interchange with the Jubilee line. The line was closed entirely between March 1995 and March 1998 for major maintenance and refurbishment works, during which time a rail-replacement bus service operated.

The identity of the East London line changed considerably during the London Underground era. On Tube maps between 1933 and 1968 it was depicted in the same colour as the Metropolitan line. In 1970, it was renamed the "Metropolitan line — East London Section", in Metropolitan line purple with a white stripe down the middle. In the 1980s it became a line in its own right (though it was still grouped operationally with the Metropolitan line) and from 1990 its colour on the map changed to orange. In 1995, London Underground threatened to close the line if it did not receive listed building consent from the London Docklands Development Corporation for the shotcreting of four arches of Thames Tunnel. Maintenance passed to the Metronet consortium in 2003 under a public-private partnership, although the operation of trains continued to be the responsibility of Transport for London (TfL). According to TfL, the line carried 10.7 million passengers per year before its temporary closure in 2007.

==== Physical characteristics ====
The line was the only Underground line not to penetrate London fare zone 1 and (apart from the Moorgate to Finsbury Park service, transferred to British Rail in 1976) the only line designed and constructed for mainline trains. At 5.6 miles (9.0 km) in length it was the second-shortest line (after the Waterloo & City line), with nine stations and an end-to-end journey time of 14 minutes. It ran in tunnel from Whitechapel to Surrey Quays, with the remainder on the surface or in cutting. Whilst much of the line was built as cut-and-cover, it also contained overground and tube construction features. The deepest point is at Wapping station, constructed in the Thames Tunnel's original entrance shaft 60 feet (18 m) below the surface.

It connected with South Eastern Main Line services at New Cross and Brighton Main Line services at New Cross Gate. Underground connections were at Canada Water (Jubilee line) and Whitechapel (District and Hammersmith & City Lines). A non-contiguous connection with the Docklands Light Railway was at Shadwell, with the DLR station some 160 feet (49 m) away on a viaduct. Although the interchange was via the street, through ticketing was permitted.

A link with the Metropolitan and District lines was made just south of Whitechapel via St Mary's Curve. This has been out of passenger use since 1939 but was still used to transfer rolling stock to and from the Metropolitan line's main depot at Neasden. The curve can easily be seen on the northbound and eastbound approaches to Whitechapel station, although a temporary wall was built across the line in January 2008, close to the junction with the District line..

Most of the line was double track, with Shoreditch station and the final sections into the southern termini single track, the latter because of lack of space. This required trains to alternate between the two southern termini.

==== Rolling stock ====
The line used Metropolitan line A60 and A62 sub-surface rolling stock built by Cravens of Sheffield in two batches between 1960 and 1962. It was upgraded between 1995 and 1998 with improved suspension, lighting, heating and ventilation. The rolling stock was regularly interchanged with that used on the main Metropolitan line and usually carried both East London and Metropolitan line maps, but ELL trains were four-car units with a driving cab at each end, unlike Metropolitan line trains, which, aside from the Chesham shuttle, ran as eight-car trains. Metropolitan line trains were mostly two single-ended units coupled together with fully operational driving cabs at each end: the Met could use any ELL trains, but the ELL could use only double-ended units.

Seven four-car trains operated the line (six off-peak, seven during peak hours when Shoreditch was open). Off peak, train seven became the spare. The line operated some of the shortest trains on the network, necessitated by short platforms. The small number of trains made the line particularly sensitive to disruption caused by vandalism, train faults or staff shortages. Sometimes in the early 2000s only two trains were running. Trains were operated by just a driver: the decision to withdraw the guards prompted an unsuccessful strike by the National Union of Railwaymen in May 1985.

Light maintenance and stabling took place at a small depot near New Cross, with heavier work at the main Metropolitan line depot at Neasden. Between 1985 and 1987, D78 stock operated the line before being replaced by A60 and A62 stock. During the 1970s the line was operated by 1938 Tube stock.

==== Stations ====
The stations in operation during most of the London Underground era, in order from north to south, were as follows:

Station	Opened	First Underground service	Notes
Shoreditch (replaced by Shoreditch High Street)	10 April 1876	31 March 1913	Closed on 9 June 2006, prior to whole line's temporary closure for conversion to Overground.
Whitechapel	10 April 1876	31 March 1913	Interchange with District and Hammersmith & City Lines.
Shadwell	10 April 1876	1 October 1884	Interchange with Docklands Light Railway.
Wapping	7 December 1869	1 October 1884	Thames Tunnel link to Rotherhithe
Rotherhithe	7 December 1869	1 October 1884	Thames Tunnel link to Wapping
Canada Water	19 August 1999	19 August 1999	Interchange with Jubilee line opened 17 September 1999.
Surrey Quays	7 December 1869	1 October 1884	Station was opened as Deptford Road, renamed Surrey Docks in 1911, and again renamed in 1989.
line splits
New Cross Gate	7 December 1869	1 October 1884	Interchange with Southern mainline services. Mainline station was opened as New Cross in 1839, and renamed in 1923.
New Cross	1 April 1880	1 October 1884	Interchange with Southeastern mainline services. Mainline station was opened in 1850.

=== Conversion to Overground ===
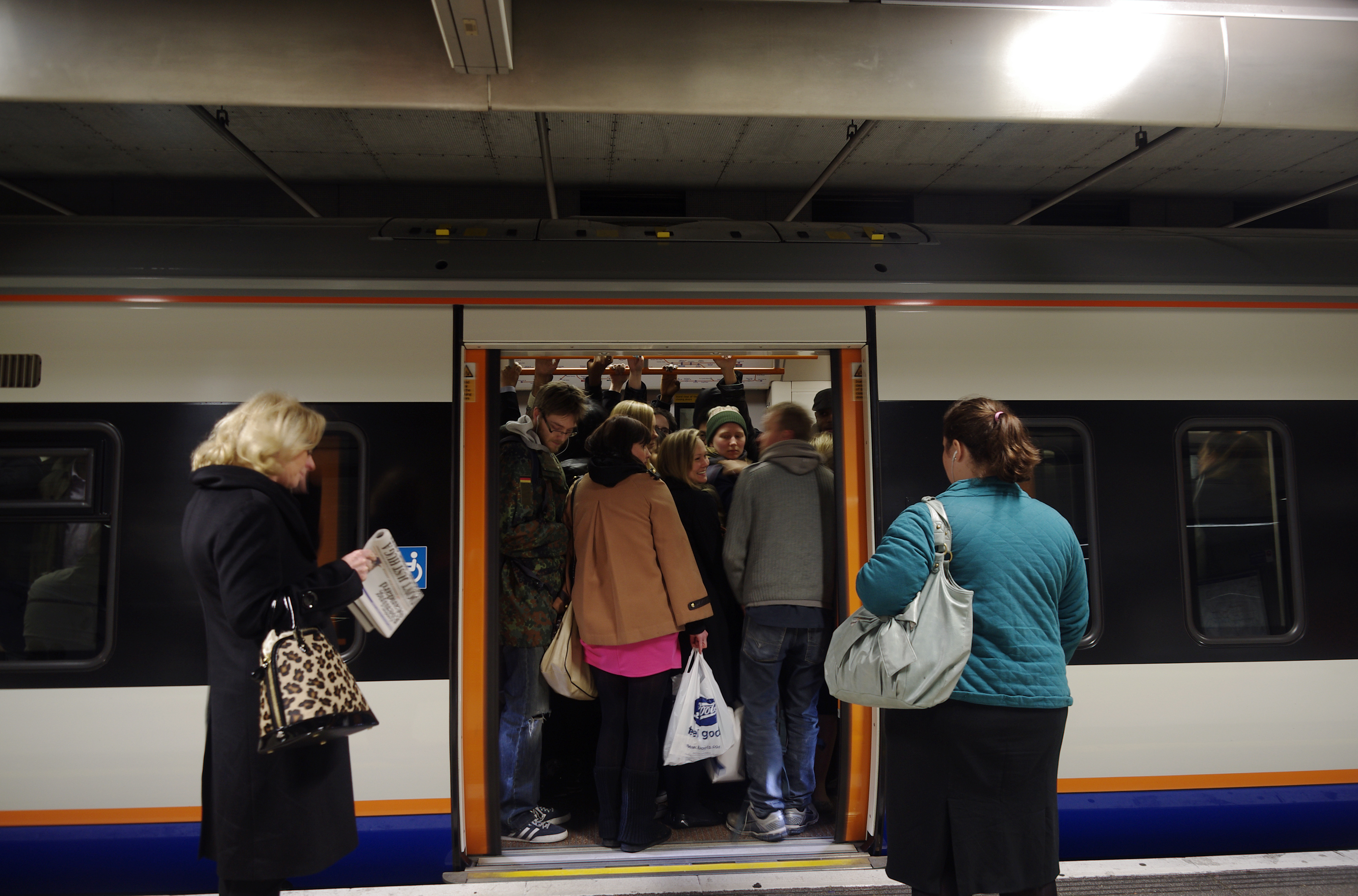
A Class 378 train at Canada Water.

Engineering work on the East London line extension started in 2005 and the underground service ended in December 2007.

In 2007 London Buses route ELW Whitechapel – Shadwell – Wapping was introduced, operating every 10 minutes, every 15 minutes at evenings and weekends. It was operated with route-branded single-deck buses. Starting on 23 December 2007 it was extended from Whitechapel to Shoreditch (Monday-Friday 07:00-10:30 & 15:30–20:30, Sunday 07:00-15:30) from 19 July 2008. The frequency of the route was cut to four buses per hour in September 2009. It was reduced to weekends-only from 28 April 2010, and withdrawn on 9 May 2010.

Between 2006 and May 2008 other rail replacement buses were provided. Route ELS Whitechapel – Shoreditch (Monday-Friday 07:00-10:30 & 15:30–20:30, Sunday 07:00-15:30) commenced 10 June 2006 and was withdrawn on 19 July 2008. It was replaced by a peak-hour extension of route ELW.

London Buses route ELC New Cross Gate – New Cross – Surrey Quays – Canada Water (Monday-Friday every 5–10 minutes, weekends every 15 minutes) started on 23 December 2007. It was withdrawn on 25 September 2009 following a 40% drop in passenger numbers. Transport for London estimated that this saved around £1 million over the period to June 2010.

London Buses route ELP Canada Water – Rotherhithe (every 15 minutes) began on 23 December 2007 and was withdrawn on 24 February 2008 due to lack of use: tickets were valid between Bermondsey and Canada Water on standard route 381.

Unlike the previous East London line closure, no replacement bus service was provided across the River Thames through the Rotherhithe Tunnel. London Transport was concerned that demand would be so high and buses would be so small that the frequency could have to be one bus every 30 seconds. There was also an issue that the Rotherhithe Tunnel is restricted to vehicles with a width no more than 7 feet (2.1 m), which had been employed on previous occasions. However, by 2007 no such vehicles were commercially available that were low-floor compliant: the only ones with this width, as previously used, were minibuses with higher floors. As bus policy by this time was 100% low floor, it meant that no such service could be provided.

A limited train service was introduced on 27 April 2010 and full service began on 23 May 2010.

=== History of the extended route ===
Mostly on viaduct, the route from Highbury and Islington to Shoreditch was opened in 1865. It was constructed by the North London Railway as its city branch to allow its passenger trains to reach the City of London. As originally built the line had four stations, at Dalston Junction, Haggerston, Shoreditch and a large terminus at Broad Street. At Dalston Junction, a line branched to the North London line eastwards, allowing services to Hackney, Bow and Poplar (East India Road). This route closed to passengers in 1944 and goods on 4 July 1966.

At its peak, Broad Street was the third-busiest station in London (after Liverpool Street and Victoria). At the start of the 20th century, more than one train per minute arrived or departed Broad Street during rush hour, with over 27 million passengers in 1902. Intermediate station traffic stagnated due to bus and tram competition, and Haggerston and Shoreditch stations were closed in 1940 following bomb damage in World War II. The line remained busy up to the 1950s, receiving traffic from the East Coast Main Line, West Coast Main Line and other routes. However, it declined following the war and was closed on 30 June 1986. While Broad Street station's site was immediately sold for office use, becoming the Broadgate development, the route north was mothballed. The present Haggerston and Dalston Junction stations have been built next to and on the original sites, but Shoreditch High Street station is on a new alignment connecting the two routes.

== Extension ==
=== Phase 1 ===
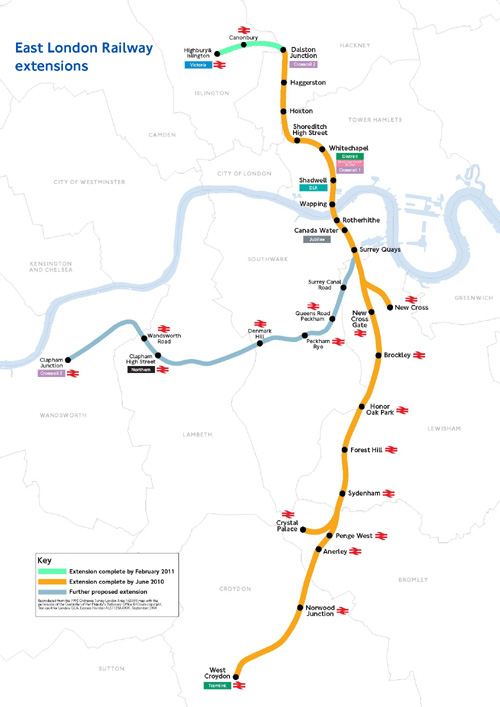
East London line Extension plans as envisaged in 2006. Dalston Junction and Clapham Junction are shown as future interchanges with the proposed Crossrail 2 (Chelsea-Hackney) line.

The former line was extended northwards from Whitechapel, with new stations at Shoreditch High Street, Hoxton, Haggerston and Dalston Junction using 2.2 miles (3.5 km) of new trackbed between Whitechapel and the Broad Street viaduct, and disused trackbed for most of rest of the distance. A further extension to Highbury & Islington was opened in February 2011.

It was extended south to connect to the London Bridge arm of the Brighton Main Line, linked via a northbound flyover north of New Cross Gate. Other than the new flyover and some associated works around New Cross Gate, it uses almost entirely existing track, running south to West Croydon via Brockley, Honor Oak Park, Forest Hill, Sydenham, Penge West, Crystal Palace (by way of a branch), Anerley and Norwood Junction.

The official opening of most of phase 1 of the East London line extension took place on 23 May 2010. Use of the line was forecast to increase from the previous 10.4 million passengers per year to 35.4 million, and to 50 million when phase 2 is finished. Transport for London acquired 20 new four-car Class 378 Bombardier Capitalstar electric multiple units to operate on the line. Unlike the dual-voltage 378s on the North London and West London lines, the East London line units can only receive power from the third rail electrification, although, like all modern EMUs, they have the potential to be retro-fitted.

The track and the northern extension remain under TfL ownership, and the stations from Dalston Junction to Surrey Quays are part of the London Overground network. The extension runs northwards from Whitechapel to Dalston Junction, and south to Crystal Palace and West Croydon.

=== Highbury & Islington extension ===
The line was extended northwards to Highbury & Islington on 28 February 2011, two months earlier than previously announced, with eight trains per hour during most of the day. The first train, with headcode 9A20, was the 09:55 Highbury & Islington – Crystal Palace, which departed on time from platform 2 and was formed of a four-car class 378 unit.

=== East London line extension phase 2 ===
A further 6.7 miles (10.8 km) link opened in 2012 from south of Surrey Quays via the Network Rail South London line to Clapham Junction via Queens Road Peckham, Peckham Rye, Denmark Hill, Clapham High Street and Wandsworth Road. A new station at Surrey Canal Road was also planned, but this was put on hold in 2009, though a suitable 'box' is being provided as part of the works to facilitate later implementation. The service from Highbury & Islington to Clapham Junction commenced on 9 December 2012. There are three services per day that run from Wandsworth Road to Battersea Park to maintain a service along that route as a parliamentary train.

The extension uses an alignment between Surrey Quays and Queens Road Peckham stations that had not seen services since 1913. The "new" section diverges from the East London line south of Surrey Quays station and joins the South London line just north of the closed Old Kent Road station. The route skirts the Bridgehouse Meadows public open space; this was used as the construction site, then restored to public use after completion. The former pedestrian bridge and support piers over Surrey Canal Road were demolished as a precursor to building the railway bridge. The planned lowering of Surrey Canal Road and associated work to the services were not carried out as a higher elevation was adopted, with a 1 in 30 (3.3 per cent) incline allowing the railway to cross at a suitable height.

=== Train lengthening ===
To cope with increased demand, the class 378 units which operate on the line have been extended to five cars. Although the new stations on the line have platforms which are either at least five cars long or provide space for platform extensions, some stations cannot be extended and so selective door opening is required.

== Service ==
The combined East London and South London line service is described by Transport for London as the Highbury & Islington to New Cross, Clapham Junction, Crystal Palace and West Croydon route. As of the December 2023 timetable the typical off-peak service pattern in trains per hour (tph) is:

Route	tph	Calling at
Dalston Junction to New Cross	4	Haggerston; Hoxton; Shoreditch High Street; Whitechapel; Shadwell; Wapping; Rotherhithe; Canada Water; Surrey Quays
Dalston Junction to Clapham Junction	4	Haggerston; Hoxton; Shoreditch High Street; Whitechapel; Shadwell; Wapping; Rotherhithe; Canada Water; Surrey Quays; Queens Road Peckham; Peckham Rye; Denmark Hill; Clapham High Street; Wandsworth Road
Highbury & Islington to Crystal Palace	4	Canonbury; Dalston Junction; Haggerston; Hoxton; Shoreditch High Street; Whitechapel; Shadwell; Wapping; Rotherhithe; Canada Water; Surrey Quays; New Cross Gate; Brockley; Honor Oak Park; Forest Hill; Sydenham
Highbury & Islington to West Croydon	4	Canonbury; Dalston Junction; Haggerston; Hoxton; Shoreditch High Street, Whitechapel; Shadwell; Wapping; Rotherhithe; Canada Water; Surrey Quays; New Cross Gate; Brockley; Honor Oak Park; Forest Hill; Sydenham; Penge West; Anerley; Norwood Junction

A Friday and Saturday night service was introduced between Dalston Junction and New Cross Gate (initially not stopping at Whitechapel) from December 2017.

=== Renaming ===
In July 2023, TfL announced that it would be giving each of the six Overground services unique names by the end of the following year. In February 2024, it was confirmed that the service running on the East London and South London lines would be named the Windrush line (to honour the Windrush generation of immigrants to the area from the Caribbean) and would be coloured red on the updated network map.
