= New Cross railway station =

National Rail station in London, England

New Cross
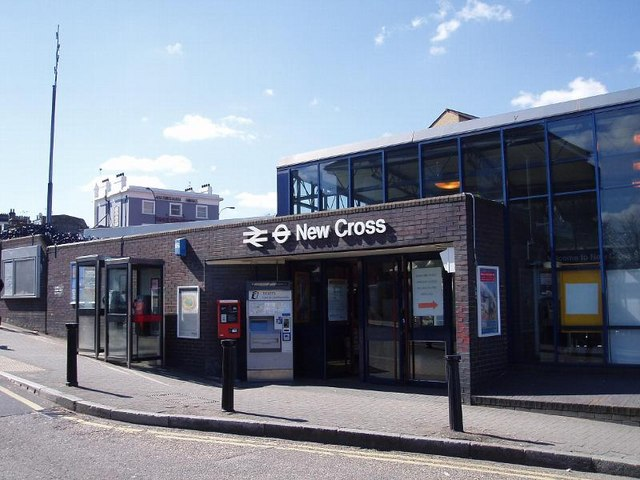
- Entrance to New Cross station
- Interactive map of New Cross

General information
- Location: New Cross
- Local authority: London Borough of Lewisham
- Managed by: Southeastern
- Owner: Network Rail
- Station code: NWX
- DfT category: C2
- Number of platforms: 4
- Accessible: Yes
- Fare zone: 2
- OSI: New Cross Gate

National Rail annual entry and exit
- 2020–21: ▼0.903 million
- Interchange: ▼0.174 million
- 2021–22: ▲2.492 million
- Interchange: ▲0.451 million
- 2022–23: ▲3.071 million
- Interchange: ▲4.609 million
- 2023–24: ▲3.146 million
- Interchange: ▼0.768 million
- 2024–25: ▲3.181 million
- Interchange: ▼0.470 million
- 2025–26: ▲3.351 million
- Interchange: ▼0.415 million

Key dates
- October 1850: Opened
- October 1850: East London Line opened
- 22 December 2007: London Underground services discontinued
- 27 April 2010: East London line reopened

Other information
- External links: Departures; Facilities
- Coordinates: 51.4766°N 0.0327°W

New Cross is an interchange station between the Windrush line of the London Overground and National Rail services operated by Southeastern, located in New Cross in south-east London. It is 4 miles 68 chains (7.8 km) down the line from London Charing Cross and is in London fare zone 2. It is a southern terminus of some Windrush line services from Dalston Junction.

There is an out-of-station interchange with New Cross Gate station, also situated on the Windrush line of the London Overground, located 620 metres (680 yd) walk away. To avoid confusion with those at New Cross Gate, the platforms at New Cross are lettered rather than numbered. Ticket barriers control access to all platforms.

== History ==
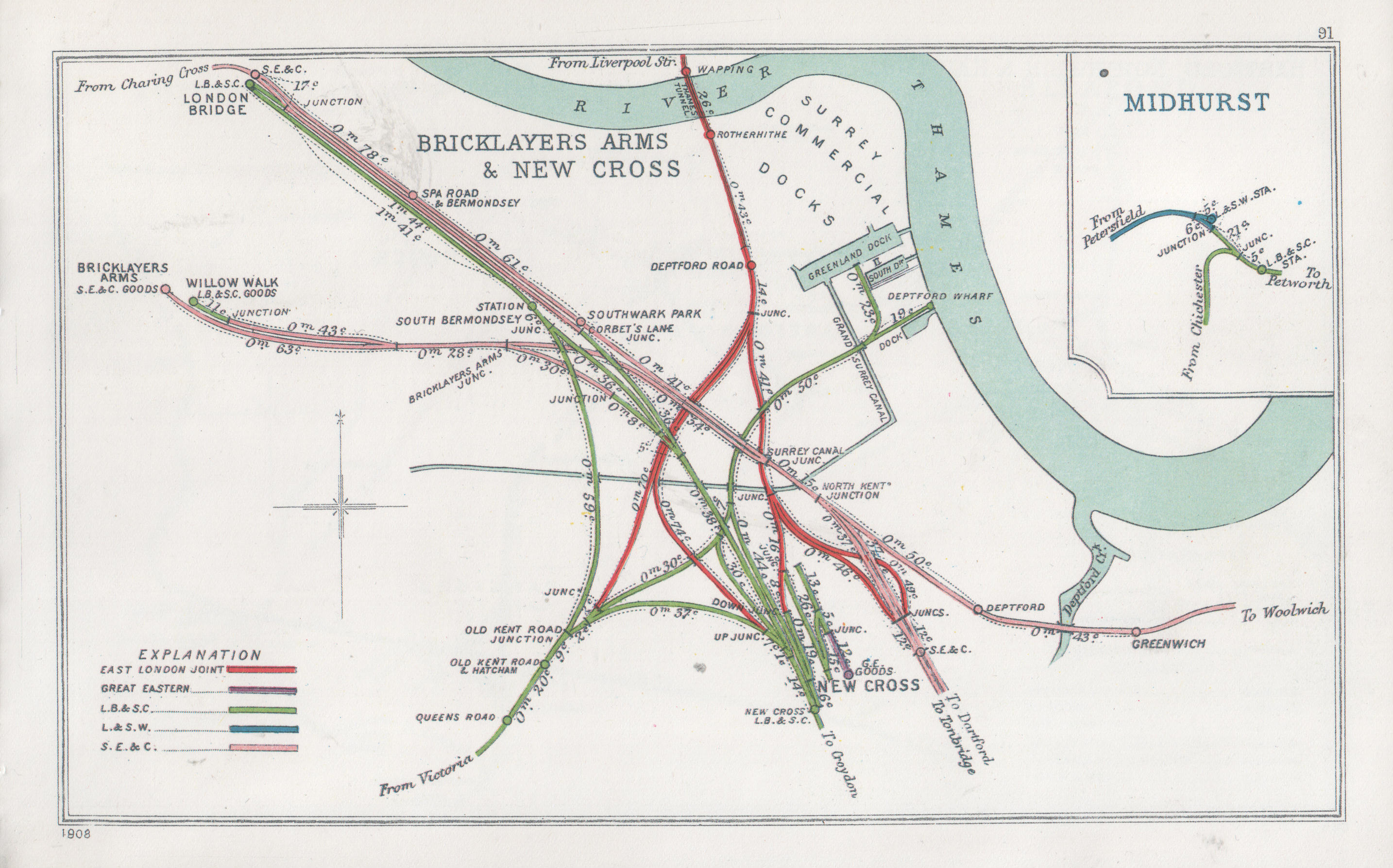
A 1908 Railway Clearing House map showing lines around New Cross (lower right, indicated "S.E.& C.")

In the early Victorian railway boom two companies constructed lines through the area. The London and Croydon Railway (L&CR) built a station on the New Cross Road close to Hatcham in 1839.

On 14 October 1844 a large fire that broke out in a paint shop destroyed carriage and engine sheds and workshops adjacent to the station. The fire was witnessed by Louis Philippe I, King of France who was travelling from the station to Dover.

On 30 July 1849 the South Eastern Railway (SER) opened a station at North Kent Junction when the North Kent line opened linking Strood with the London and Greenwich Railway route to London Bridge. This station proved inconvenient so a new station called New Cross & Naval School was opened by the SER in October 1850 located adjacent to the New Cross Road in the heart of New Cross. In 1854 the station was renamed New Cross. Accordingly, both the South Eastern Railway (SER) and the London Brighton & South Coast Railway had stations named New Cross which caused confusion until the two companies were absorbed under the 1923 grouping into the Southern Railway and the name of the older station was changed to New Cross Gate; the ex-South Eastern station remained New Cross.

On 7 December 1869 the East London Line opened serving the LBSCR New Cross station but it was not until 1 April 1880 that services (which started at Addiscombe and worked through to Liverpool Street) started operation via New Cross SER. Freight trains also operated via the East London Line and were hauled by Great Eastern Railway locomotives through to Hither Green Goods Yards. From 30 June 1911 East London Line passenger services south of New Cross ceased.

On 31 March 1913 electric passenger services operated by the Metropolitan Railway started operation from New Cross and worked through to Kensington Addison Road via Kings Cross.

After World War II and following nationalisation on 1 January 1948, the station was part of British Railways Southern Region.

The East London Line was closed to goods traffic in 1962.

In the 1950s and 1960s, London Underground planned a new line connecting north-west and south-east London. Approval for the first stage of the Fleet line (renamed the Jubilee line in 1975) to Charing Cross was granted in 1969, with second and third stages approved in 1971 and 1972. New Cross station was to be the penultimate station of phase 3 running to Lewisham. Southbound trains were to serve one of the existing platforms and northbound trains would have served a new platform in tunnel beneath the station. Although phases 2 and 3 were not carried out due to a lack of funds, a 200-yard (180 m) section of the northbound tunnel was constructed near New Cross in 1972 to test new tunnelling techniques.

The station was rebuilt in the 1970s and the original station buildings on the road bridge were replaced in 1975 by a wooden building which opened in Amersham Vale. Platforms on the down and up fast lines were closed and demolished and a new track layout was introduced at this time in connection with the wider London Bridge re-signaling scheme.

In 1985, the present buildings in Amersham Vale opened.

Until 22 December 2007 London Underground used to serve this station as the southern terminus to their East London line. This closed for major engineering work to convert the East London line to standard 750 V third rail electrification. The line reopened on 27 April 2010 with services now operated by London Overground using Class 378 Capitalstar units.

== Carriage Shed ==
A 6 siding carriage shed was located just north of the station. Built by the East London Railway the shed was leased by the Metropolitan Railway and continued in service until the line closed in 2007. When the line re-opened the new Capitalstar units were maintained at a new depot at New Cross Gate.

== Services ==
New Cross is a southern terminus of the Windrush line of the London Overground, with services operated using Class 378 EMUs. Additional services at the station are operated by Southeastern using Class 376, 465, 466 and 707 EMUs.

The typical off-peak service in trains per hour is:

- 6 tph to London Cannon Street
- 2 tph to Orpington via Grove Park
- 2 tph to Dartford via Woolwich Arsenal
- 2 tph to Slade Green via Bexleyheath, continuing to London Cannon Street via Woolwich Arsenal and Greenwich
- 4 tph to Dalston Junction via Surrey Quays (Windrush line)

Additional services, including trains to and from London Cannon Street via Sidcup call at the station during the peak hours.

Preceding station	National Rail	Following station
London Bridge	Southeastern Grove Park Line	St Johns
London Bridge	Southeastern North Kent Line	St Johns
London Bridge	Southeastern Bexleyheath Line	St Johns
London Bridge	Southeastern Dartford Loop Line Peak Hours Only	St Johns
Preceding station	London Overground	Following station
Surrey Quays towards Dalston Junction	Windrush line East London line	Terminus
Former services
Preceding station	LUL	Following station
Surrey Docks towards Hammersmith	Metropolitan line: (1884-1906); (1913-1939)	Terminus
Surrey Quays towards Shoreditch	East London line (1940-2007)	Terminus
Abandoned plans
Preceding station	LUL	Following station
Surrey Docks towards Stanmore	Jubilee line Phase 3 (never constructed)	Lewisham Terminus

== Connections ==
London Buses routes 53, 177, 225, 453 and night routes N53 and N89 serve the station.

== Accidents ==
- The Spa Road Junction rail crash occurred outside the station on 8 January 1999.
- On 10 January 2022, a passenger train ran into the buffer stop at New Cross.
