= Shoreditch tube station =

Former London Underground station

Shoreditch
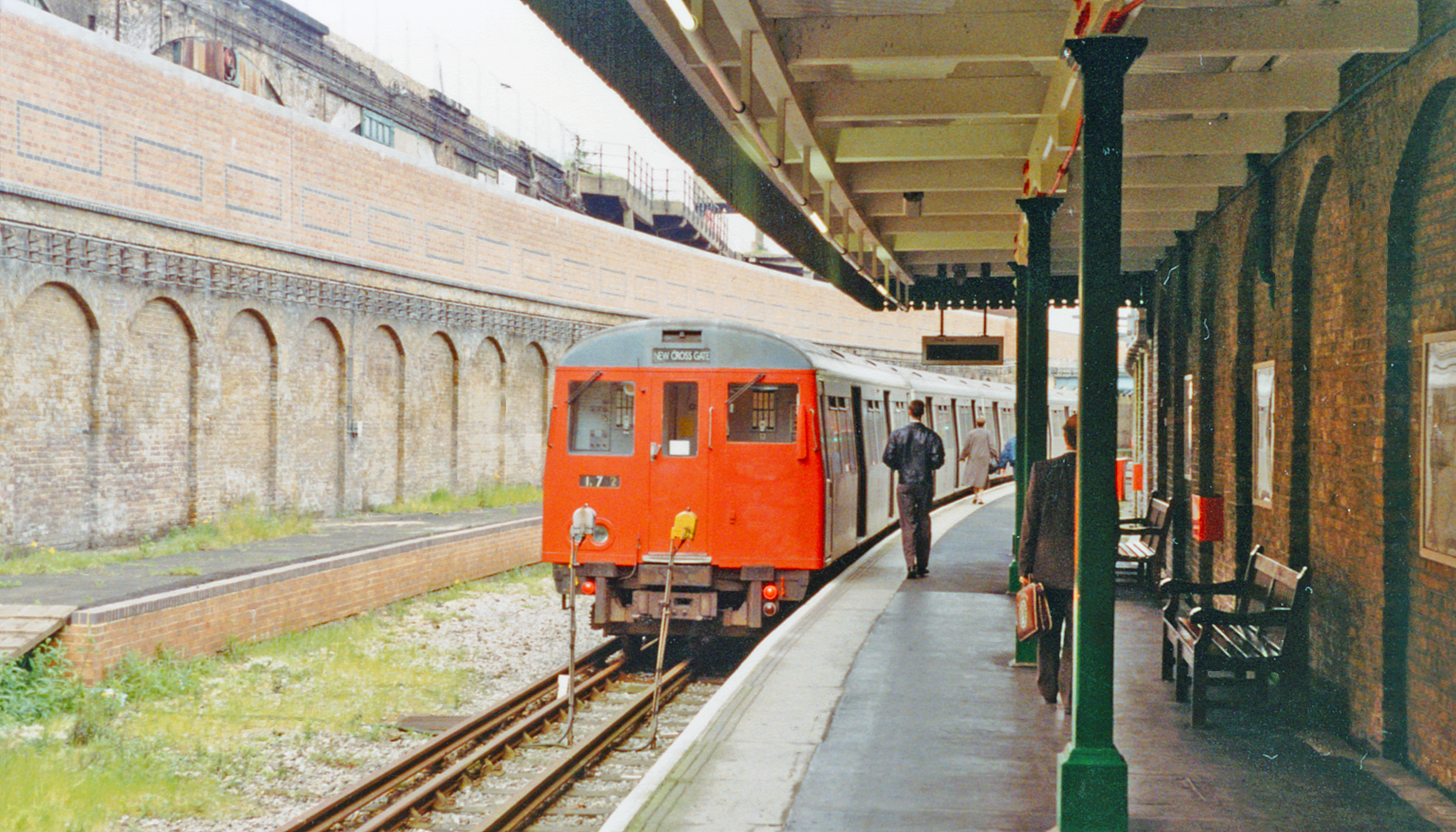
- Interactive map of Shoreditch

General information
- Location: Pedley Street
- Local authority: London Borough of Tower Hamlets
- Owner: London Underground
- Number of platforms: 1 (originally 2)

Key dates
- 19 April 1876: Opened
- 9 June 2006: Closed
- Replaced by: Shoreditch High Street

Other information
- Coordinates: 51°31′22″N 0°04′15″W

Shoreditch was a London Underground station located in Shoreditch in the London Borough of Tower Hamlets in east London. Originally opened by the East London Railway in 1876, the station was permanently closed in 2006. It was replaced directly to the west of the site by Shoreditch High Street station in 2010.

The station was the northern terminus of the East London Line, with latterly a single platform alongside a single track that ran next to the disused Bishopsgate goods yard. Until the late 1960s the East London Line connected with the main line railway to Liverpool Street just north of Shoreditch station. The site of the link was visible from the end of the platform and still is visible from main line trains travelling between Stratford and Liverpool Street. The station was one of only a handful on the network with a single platform and a single-track layout, though it originally had two tracks and two platforms. The preceding station was Whitechapel, which after Shoreditch's closure was the northern terminus of the East London Line until the line closed for extension in 2007.

== History ==
Shoreditch station opened in April 1876 as a stop on the East London Railway from Liverpool Street to points south. The passenger service between Shoreditch and Liverpool Street was withdrawn in 1885. Shoreditch joined the Underground network on 31 March 1913 as part of the Metropolitan Railway in conjunction with an electrification of the line.

Goods services from Liverpool Street continued to pass through Shoreditch until April 1966; after then the track connection was severed in order to improve access to Liverpool Street for other trains. The station was closed from March 1995 to September 1998 during the renovation of the East London Line, reopening six months after the rest of the line.

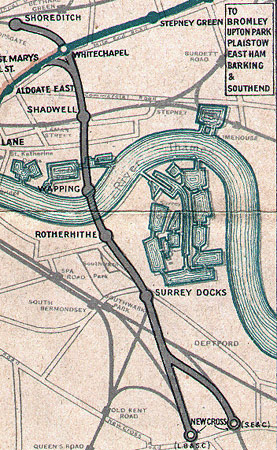
Shoreditch station on a 1915 map of the East London Line

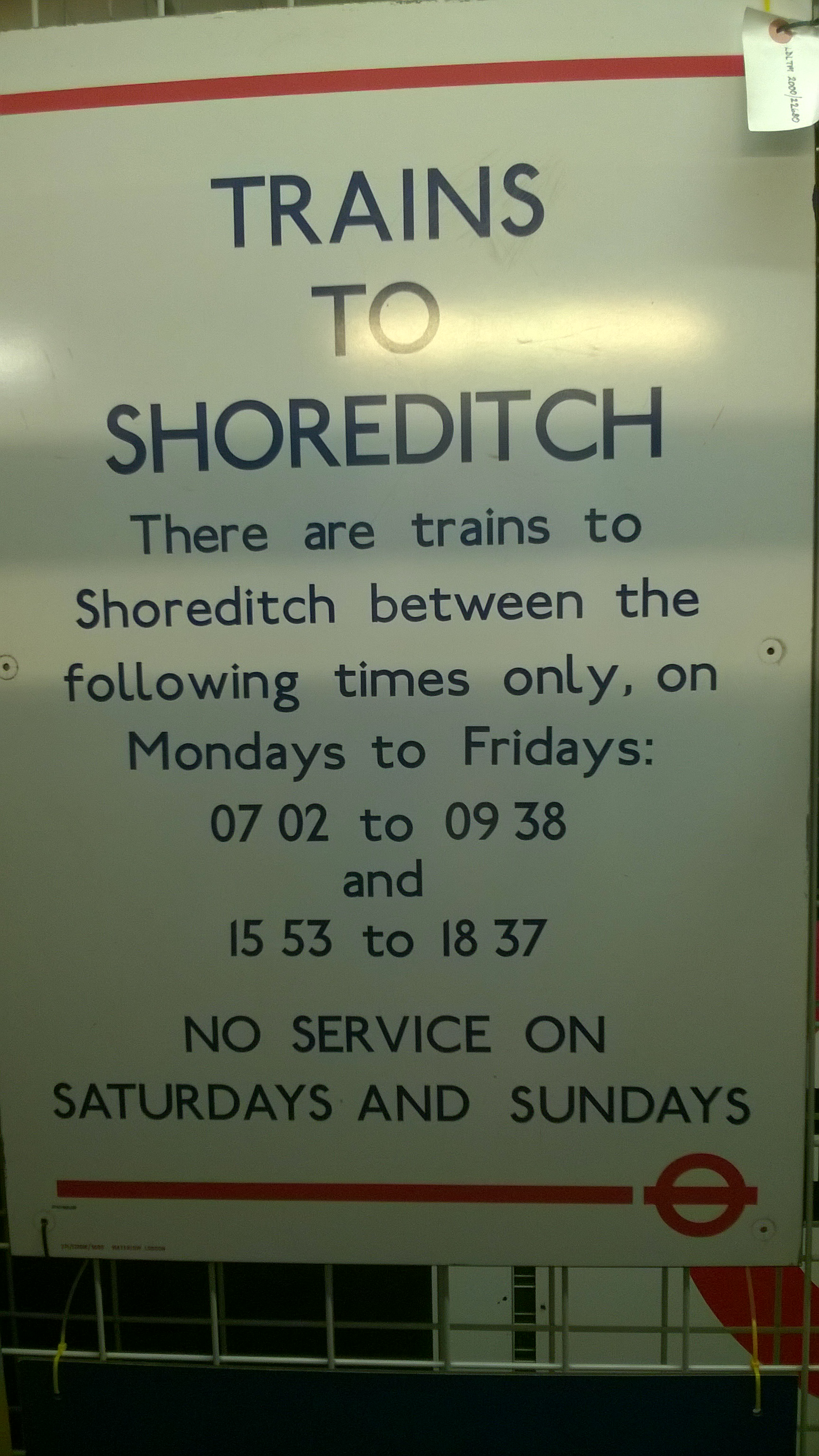
Sign showing train times from Shoreditch

Former
Preceding station	London Underground	Following station
Terminus	East London line (1913–2006)	Whitechapel towards New Cross or New Cross Gate

== Usage ==
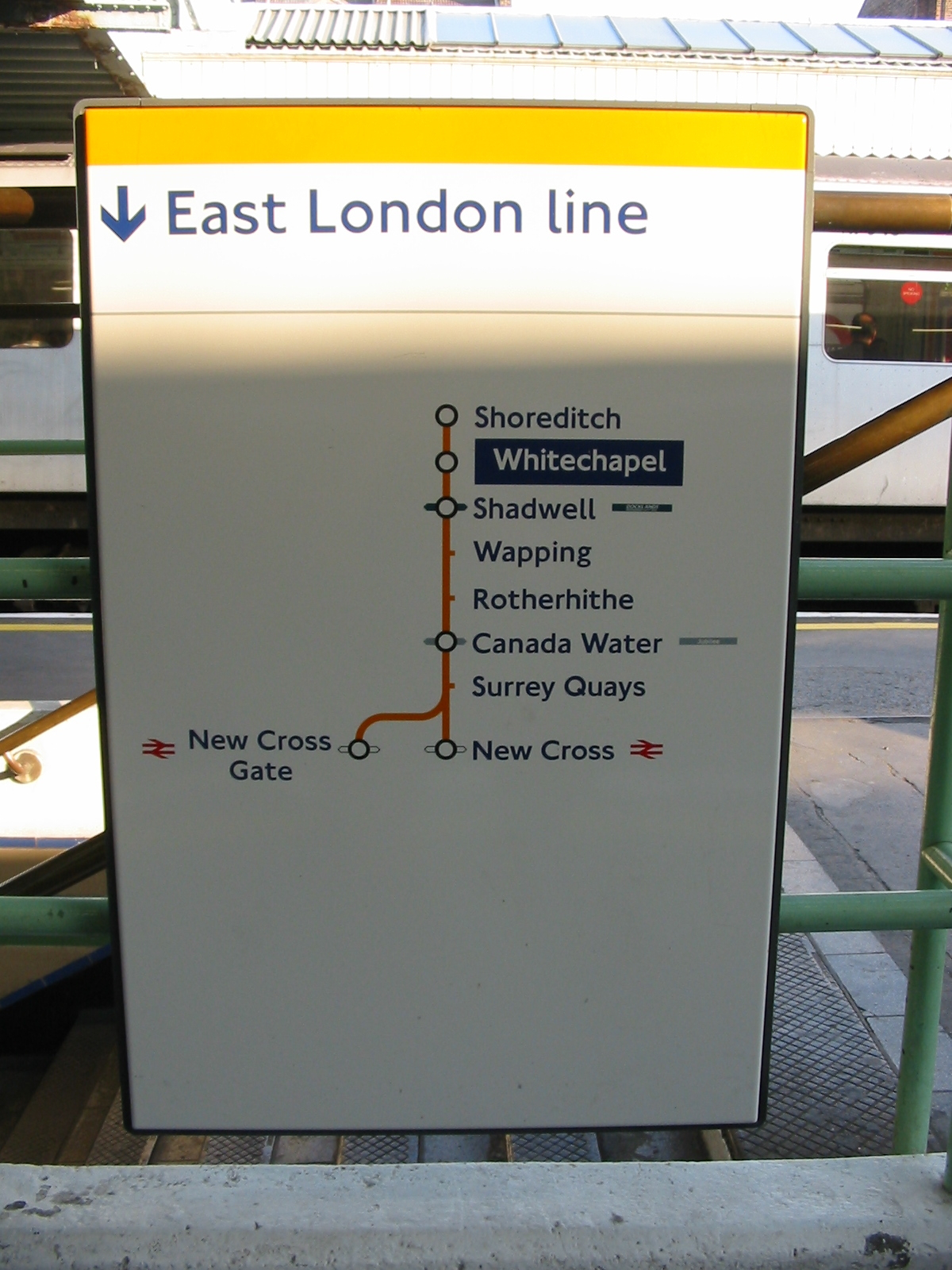
East London Line sign pictured before the closure of Shoreditch

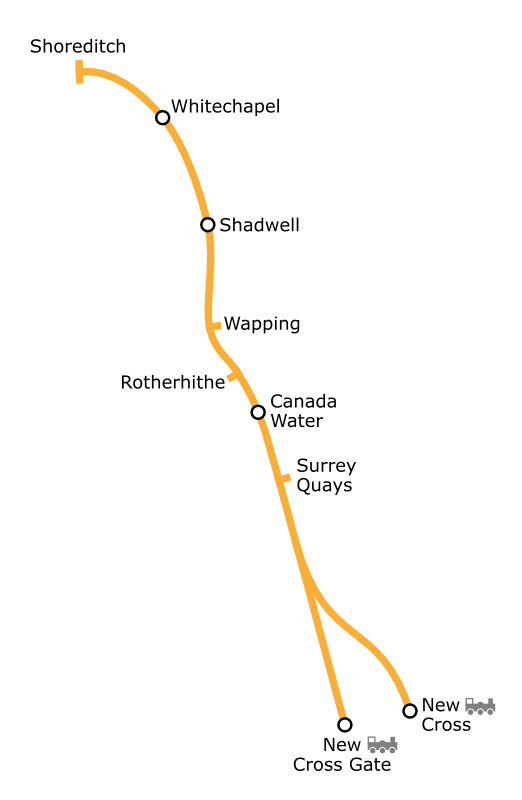
East London Line map before the closure of Shoreditch

Before its closure, Shoreditch was one of the least-used stations on the network, with only about 1,100 passengers per day. On weekdays it was open only at rush hour; it was closed on Saturdays, and open for only a few hours on Sundays for the nearby Brick Lane Market. Prior to the 1990s the station was also closed on Sundays.

- 2006: 800,000 passenger entries and exits
- 2005: 748,000
- 2004: 415,000
- 2003: 380,000

== Today ==
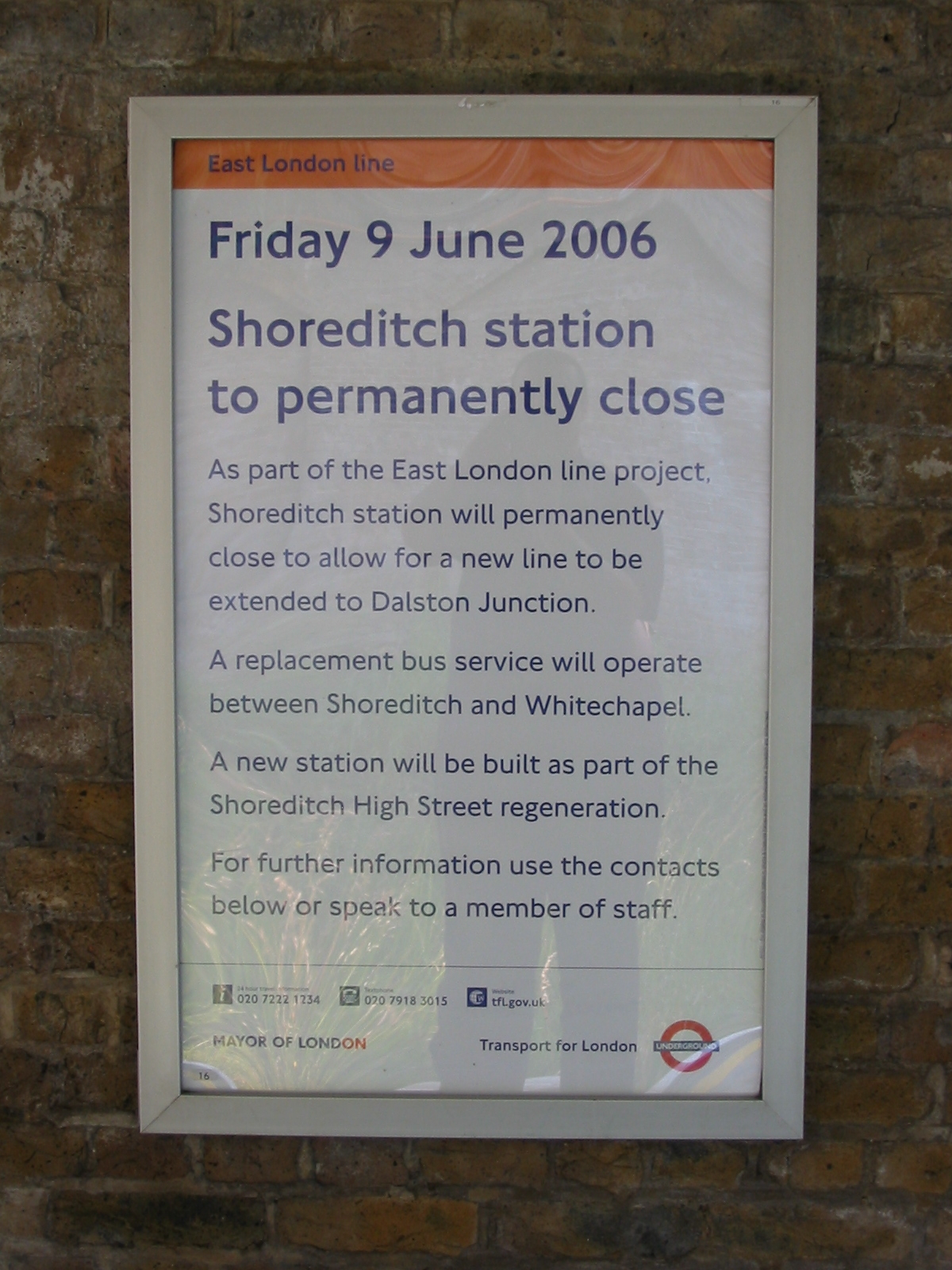
Shoreditch station closure notice in 2006

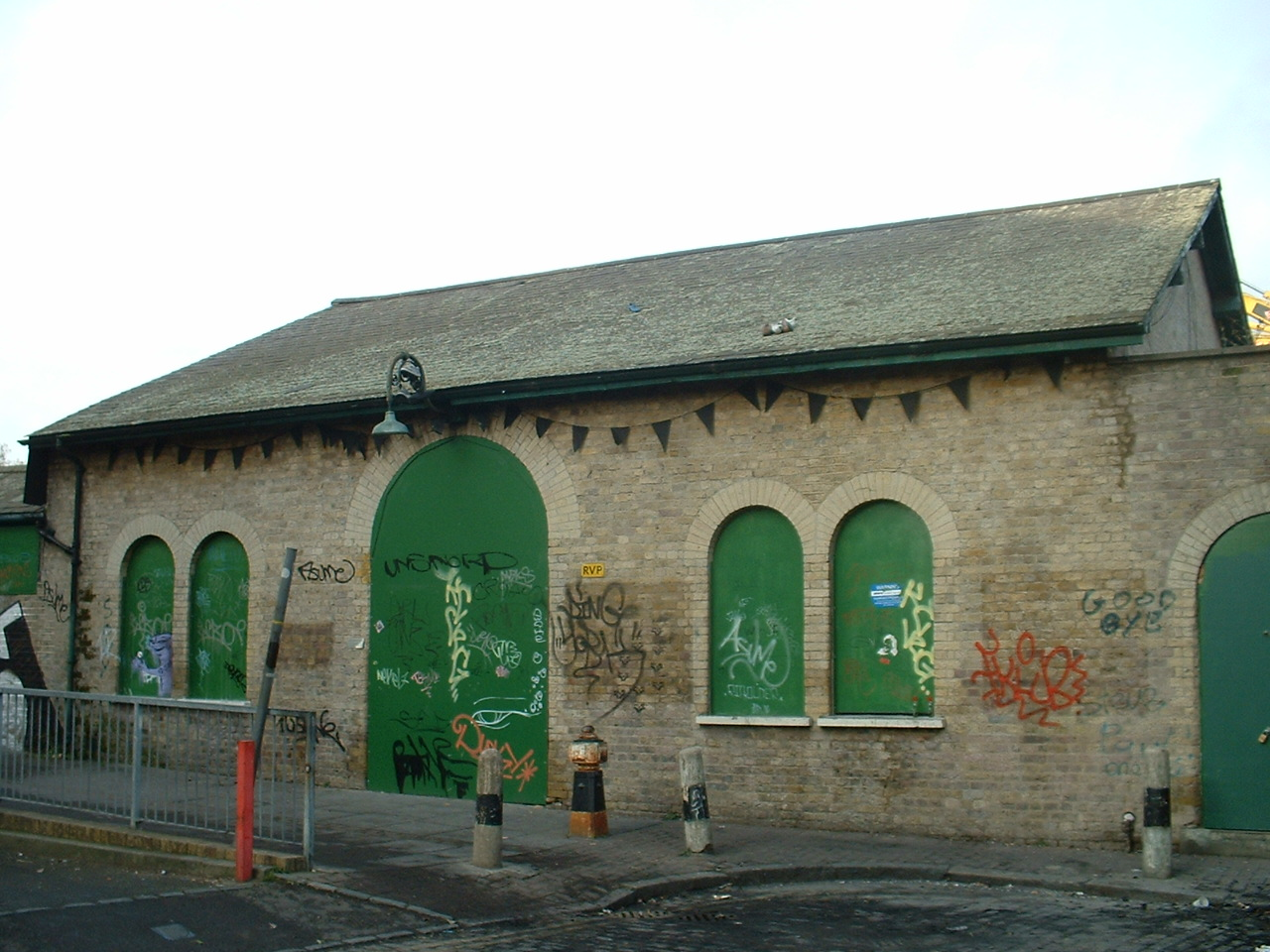
Shoreditch station building in 2007 with bricked-up windows and doors

Shoreditch station closed permanently on 9 June 2006 to allow work to begin on the East London line extension. It has been replaced by a new station called Shoreditch High Street. The new line and station form part of the London Overground network, a suburban railway operated by Transport for London (TfL) but separate from the Underground network.

Unlike other closed stations, TfL provided a temporary service to Shoreditch until the new line fully opened in 2010 in the form of a non-stop bus service connecting Shoreditch with Whitechapel using the station's previous limited opening hours.

The cutting in and around the station area was filled in and partly reused for the line from Whitechapel (also in a cutting) to the replacement Shoreditch High Street station (on a viaduct). The station building still exists and was put up for sale by TfL in February 2010. In February 2011 the building was sold at auction for £665,000. There were previously proposals for the station building to be demolished and the bricks to be reused for a six-storey block of flats, however these have not gone ahead and the building still stands.

In 2014 the building was used as a "pop-up" cinema: in summer the auditorium was furnished with six-person hot tubs from which to watch the films while in winter the concept was "bring your own pillow" to use on bean bag style beds.

== In popular culture ==
The station was used for a segment in the 1999 film Tube Tales.
