= Wandsworth Road =

Wandsworth Road may refer to:

- Part of the A3036 road
- Wandsworth Road railway station, a National Rail station in Clapham, South London served by London Overground services from Clapham Junction to Highbury & Islington, with a limited service to Battersea Park and a very limited Southeastern services to London Victoria and Bromley South
