= Hoxton railway station =

London Overground station

Hoxton
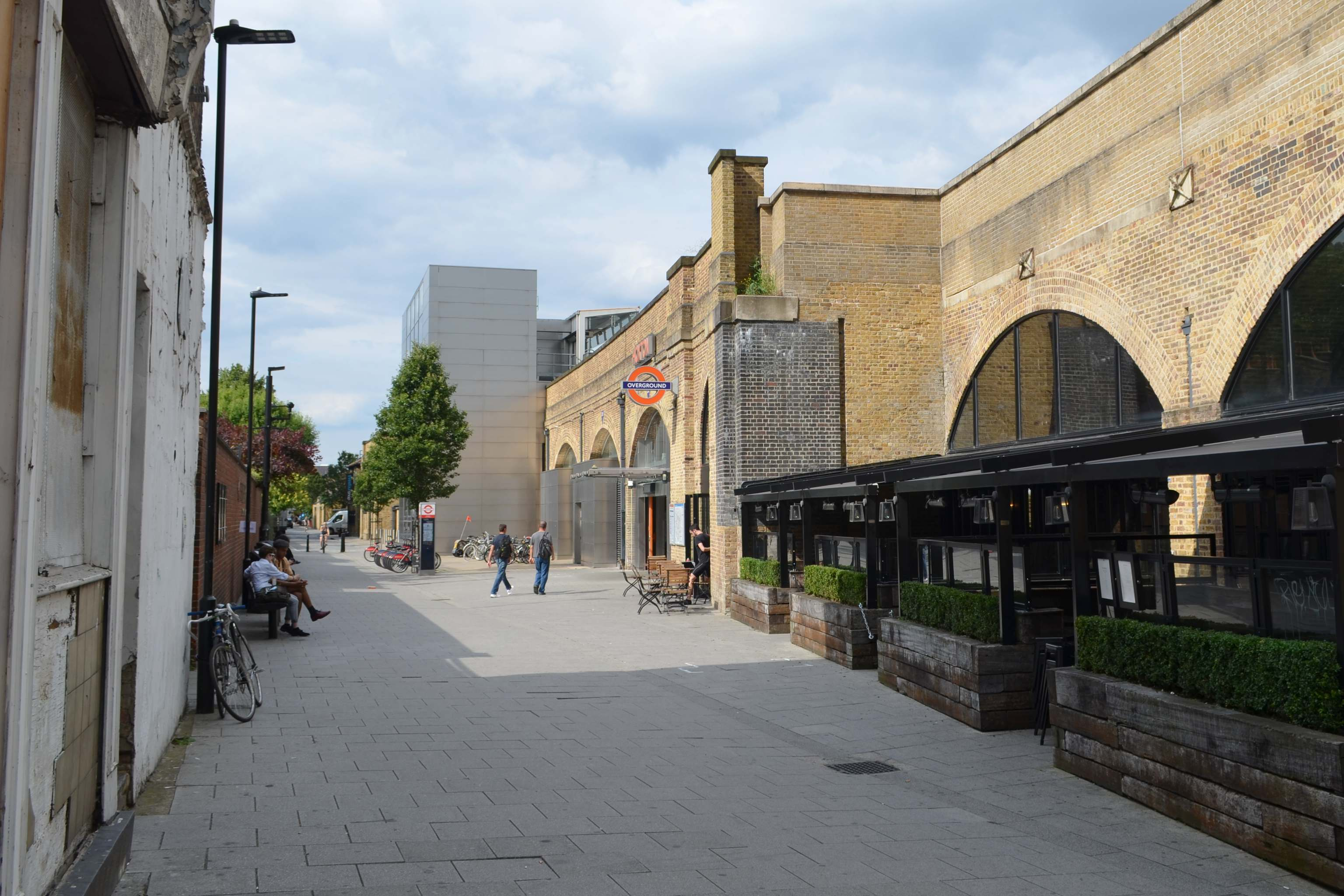
- West facade and the southern end of Geffrye Street in July 2016
- Interactive map of Hoxton

General information
- Location: Hoxton
- Local authority: London Borough of Hackney
- Managed by: London Overground
- Owner: Transport for London
- Station code: HOX
- Number of platforms: 2
- Accessible: Yes
- Fare zone: 1 and 2

National Rail annual entry and exit
- 2020–21: ▼0.877 million
- 2021–22: ▲2.192 million
- 2022–23: ▲3.254 million
- 2023–24: ▲4.098 million
- 2024–25: ▼4.084 million

Key dates
- 27 April 2010: Opened

Other information
- External links: Departures; Facilities
- Coordinates: 51.5318°N 0.0754°W

Hoxton is a station on the Windrush line of the London Overground, located in the London Borough of Hackney in East London. It is on the Kingsland Viaduct, with the station entrance situated on Geffrye Street near Dunloe Street and Cremer Street, behind the Museum of the Home.

The station was officially opened on 27 April 2010 as part of the East London line extension project, initially with week-day services running between Dalston Junction and New Cross or New Cross Gate. On 23 May 2010 services were extended from New Cross Gate to West Croydon or Crystal Palace.

== History ==
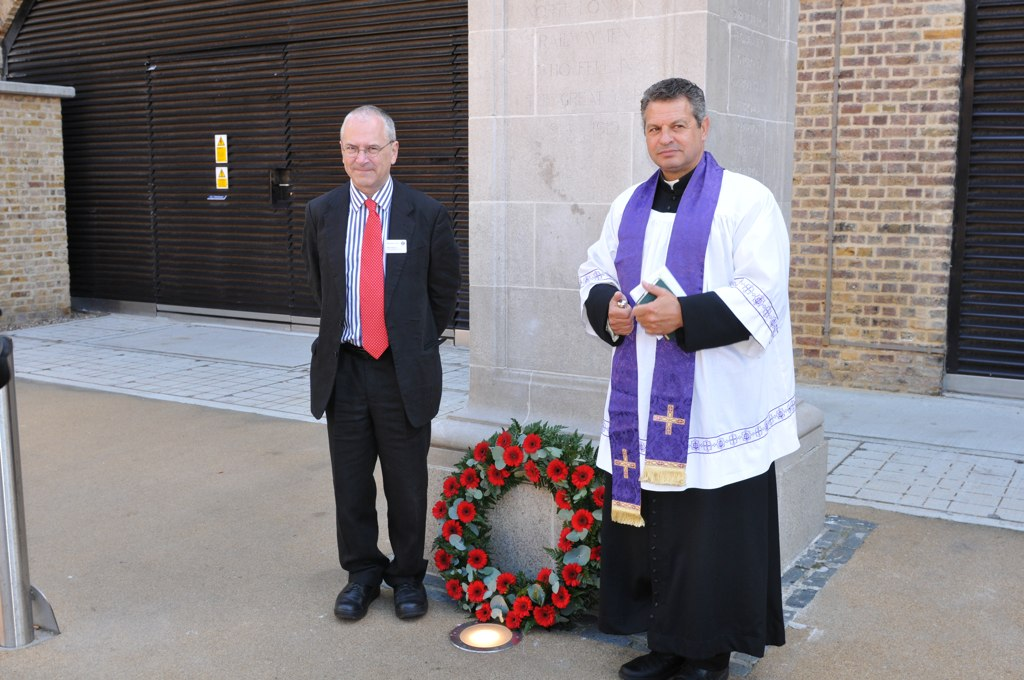
The rededication of the North London Railway War Memorial in 2011, attended by TfL's Peter Hendy and the Revd James Westcott of St Chad's Church.

Hoxton station was first identified as a new station in a London Underground proposal made in 1993 to extend the line from Whitechapel to Dalston Junction, involving the construction of new stations at Bishopsgate (Later opened as Shoreditch High Street), Hoxton and Haggerston, and received the support of a public inquiry in 1994. It was envisaged that the construction of the extension and the station itself would begin in 1996 and to be completed by 1998. The project was finally approved by the Government in 1996 but a lack of funding forced the project to be delayed in 1997.

The station is currently the only completely new station to be built along the route of the former Broad Street branch of the North London line under the East London line extension project, although it is located on the tracks leading to the former Shoreditch (Dunloe Street) Depot, which was closed in 1968.

At ground level at the entrance to the station is the First World War memorial commemorating fallen staff of the former North London Railway, which built the section of viaduct that is now the modern East London line through Hoxton. Originally placed at now-closed Broad Street Station, it was moved to first Richmond and then in 2011 returned to be nearer its former location. It is listed with Grade II.

== Layout ==
Hoxton station is a standard two-platform station with platforms situated on the Kingsland Viaduct. The platforms were originally built to accommodate a train of up to four cars but in 2015 the platforms were extended to accommodate five car electric trains of classes Class 378/1 (third rail shoes only) and 378/2 (third rail shoes and pantograph). The Ticket office and entrance concourse is located under the viaduct and access to each platform is provided by a lift and stairs.

== Services and connections ==
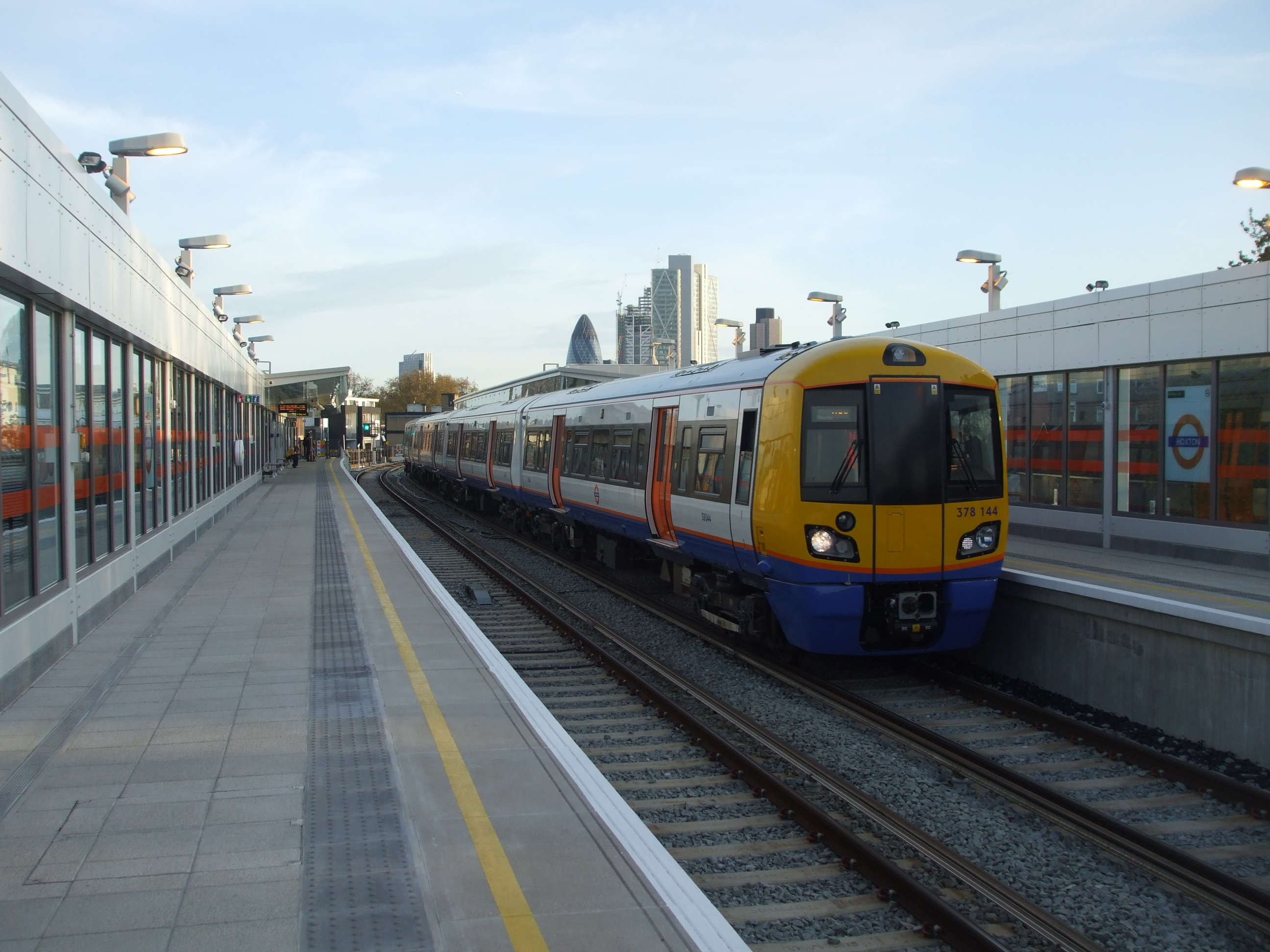
A London Overground train bound for Dalston Junction arrives at the northbound platform.

All times below are correct as of the December 2010 timetables.

Hoxton is served by the Windrush line of the London Overground. On Mondays to Saturdays there is a service every 5–10 minutes throughout the day, while on Sundays before 13:00 there is a service every 5–9 minutes, changing to every 7–8 minutes until the end of service after that. Current off peak frequency in trains per hour is:

- 16 tph to Dalston Junction, of which 8 continue to Highbury & Islington
- 4 tph to Crystal Palace
- 4 tph to New Cross
- 4 tph to West Croydon
- 4 tph to Clapham Junction via Peckham Rye

London Buses routes 26, 55, 149, 242, 243, 394 and night routes N26, N55 and N242 serve the station.

Preceding station	London Overground	Following station
Haggerston towards Dalston Junction or Highbury & Islington	Windrush line East London line	Shoreditch High Street towards Clapham Junction, Crystal Palace, New Cross or West Croydon
