= South London line =

Railway line in inner south London

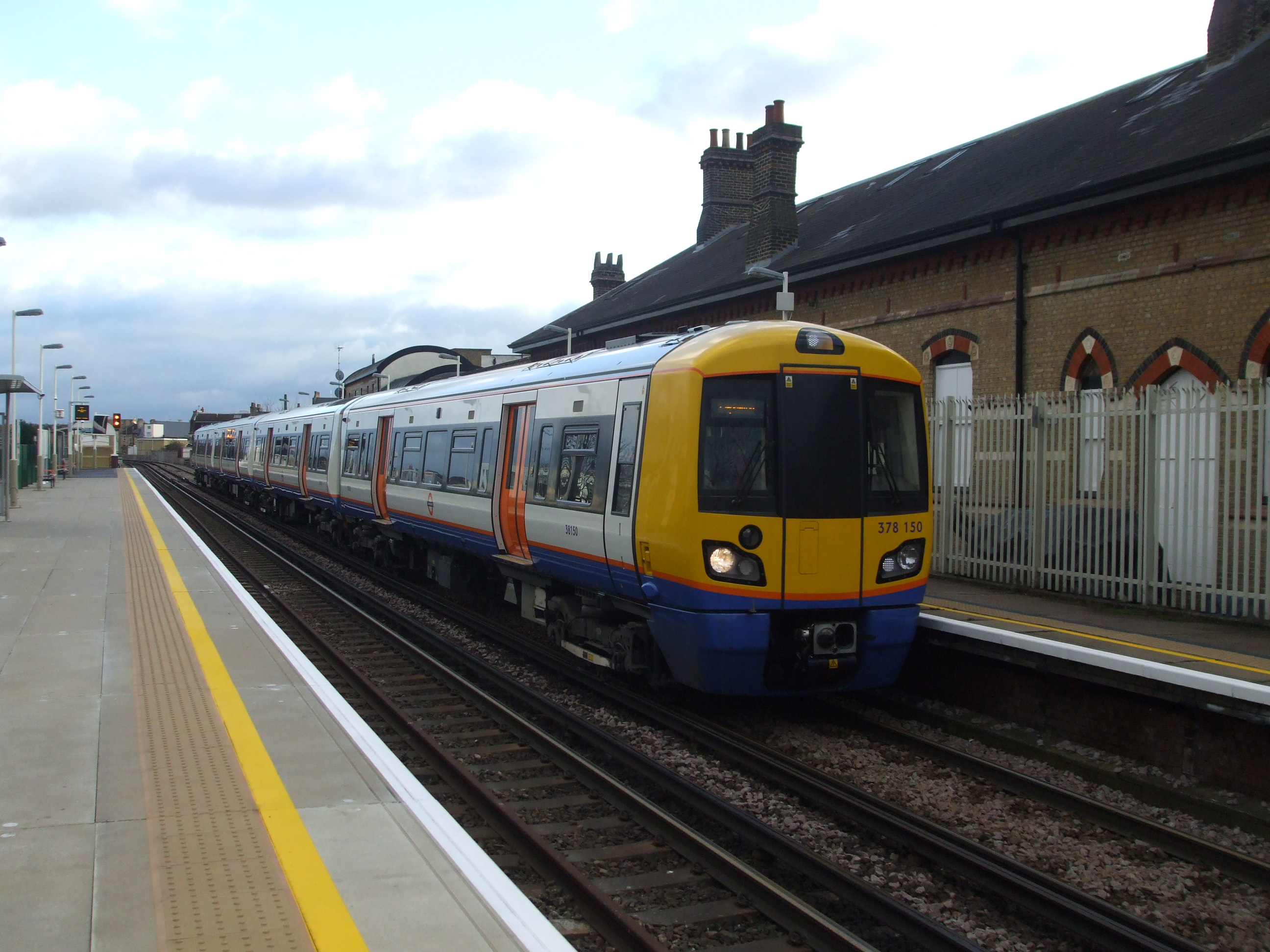
- A London Overground train at Clapham High Street

Overview
- Status: Operational
- Owner: Network Rail
- Locale: Greater London
- Termini: London Victoria; London Bridge
- Stations: 7

Service
- Type: Commuter rail, Freight rail
- System: National Rail
- Operator(s): London Overground; Southern; Southeastern
- Rolling stock: Class 375 "Electrostar"; Class 377 "Electrostar"; Class 378 "Capitalstar"; Class 465 "Networker"; Class 466 "Networker"

History
- Opened: 13 August 1866 (partial); 1 May 1867 (full route)

Technical
- Track gauge: Standard gauge
- Electrification: 750 V DC third rail
Route map
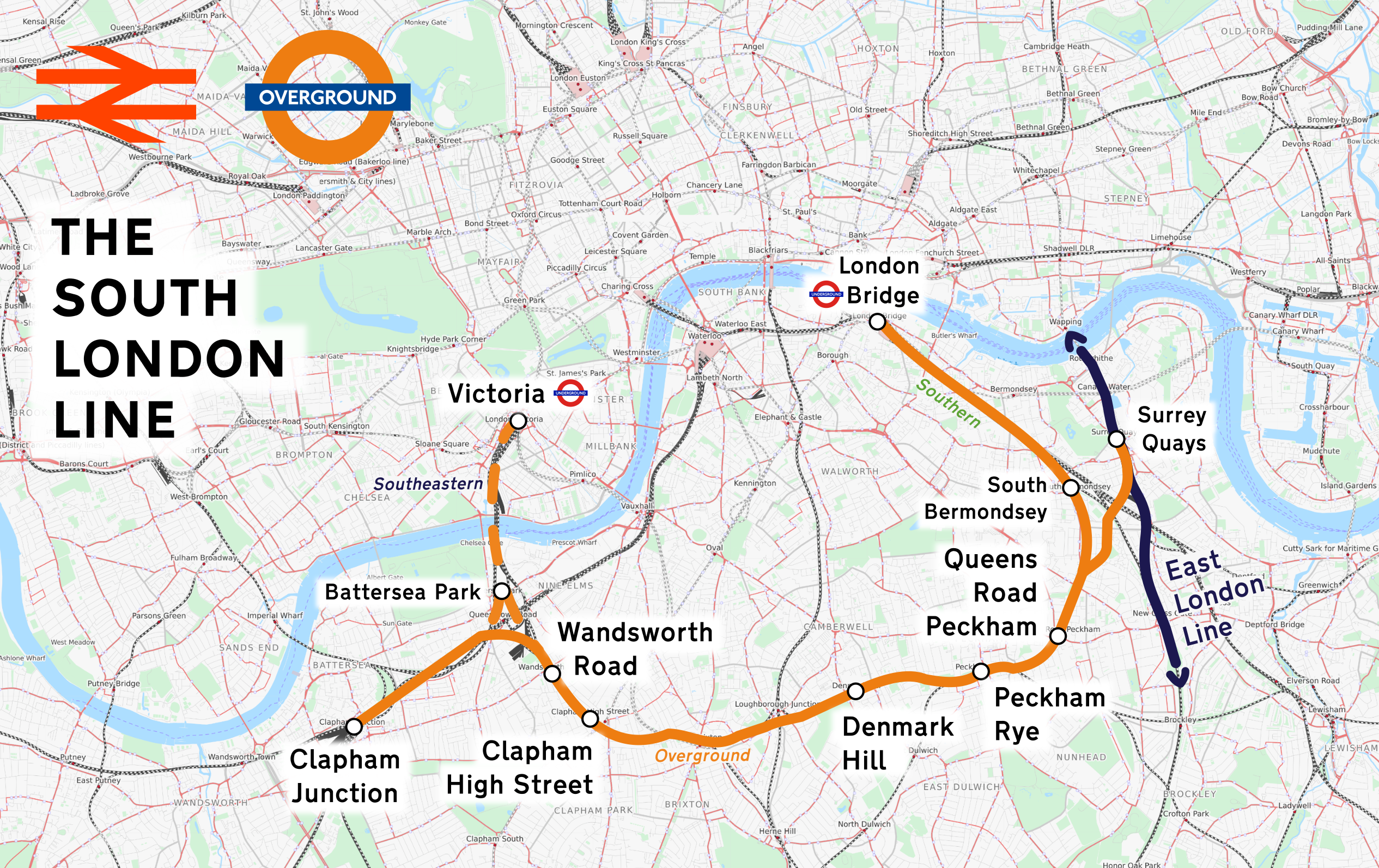

The South London line is a railway line in inner south London, England. The initial steam passenger service on the route was established by the London, Brighton and South Coast Railway (LBSCR) on 1 May 1867 when the central London terminal stations of Victoria and London Bridge were connected to the inner south London suburbs of Battersea, Clapham, Brixton, Camberwell and Peckham. A pioneer of overhead electric traction, most of the line was built on high level viaducts and was marketed as the South London Elevated Electric Railway in the early part of the 20th century.

The electric service was popular, with four trains per hour and 12 million passengers in 1920. Between Wandsworth Road and Peckham Rye the route ran parallel to another set of tracks. Prior to 1923, both lines from Wandsworth Road to East Brixton were owned by the London, Chatham and Dover Railway (LCDR) and the lines from East Brixton to Peckham Rye were owned by the LBSCR. The southern Atlantic lines were operated by the LBSCR and the northern Chatham lines were operated by the LCDR.

The LBSCR and LCDR were both constituent companies of the Southern Railway (SR) and consequently the whole line came into SR ownership in 1923. Overhead traction was replaced with third rail in 1928. This began a long, slow period of decline that culminated in the running of only nine trains a day in each direction at peak times in 1988. The line was revived following a successful campaign by the South London Line Travellers Association. The full seven day half-hourly timetable was restored in stages from 1991 to 1997.

Since December 2012, passenger services have been part of the London Overground, running a four trains an hour service between Clapham Junction and Queens Road Peckham and then via the East London line to Dalston Junction. In November 2024, the London Overground East London and South London line services were rebranded and named the Windrush line.

== History ==
=== Steam service ===
The South London line was built by the London, Brighton and South Coast Railway and the London, Chatham and Dover Railway working in cooperation because both companies desired new lines between Brixton and Peckham. The LCDR wanted to reach Crystal Palace from their existing lines in the Brixton area and the LBSCR wanted to link together their two terminal stations at Victoria and London Bridge via the inner South London suburbs.

Two parallel sets of railway lines were planned, one pair for the exclusive use of each company. The LBSCR constructed and then owned both pairs of lines between Crow Lane junction in Peckham and Barrington Road junction in Brixton. The LCDR built a line from Barrington Road junction to Wandsworth Road, in effect creating a second pair of tracks adjacent to their existing line, that would be used by the LBSCR.

LBSCR passenger service began on 13 August 1866 between London Bridge and Loughborough Park. It was extended to Victoria on 1 May 1867. During steam service there were typically 37 down (London Bridge to Victoria) and 38 up trains a day. Craven 0-4-2T locomotives were used at first. Later, Stroudley "Terrier" class 0-6-0T engines pulled four wheeled compartment coaches.

In 1868 a line to Sutton was built that branched off to the west of Peckham Rye. The new route used the South London line to reach London Bridge and significantly increased traffic over the eastern section of line. A third track was provided from Peckham Rye to London Bridge.

LBSCR service between Old Kent Road and Wapping on the East London Railway commenced in March 1871. Services extended to Liverpool Street in April 1876 and Peckham Rye in 1877. From 1885 the service was cut back to Shoreditch from Liverpool Street.

Grosvenor Road station, just south of the western terminus at Victoria, was open for LBSCR passenger service from 1 November 1870 to 1 April 1907.

=== Overhead electric ===
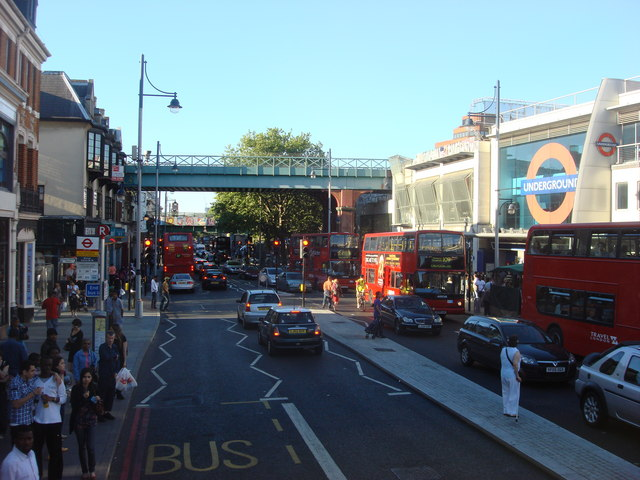
High level bridge carrying the South London line through Brixton

The popularity of the service was threatened by the development of the London County Council Tramways electric tram network in South London. Passenger numbers fell from 8 million in 1903 to 3.5 million in 1908. Legal powers to electrify all lines of the LBSCR were obtained in an act of Parliament in 1903. The LBSCR decided to electrify using the 6.6 kV 25 Hz overhead system. The work was contracted to AEG in 1906. The South London line was selected for electrification first. The initial proposal to electrify only from Peckham Rye to Battersea Park for a test shuttle service was abandoned in favour of electrifying the entire line from London Bridge to Victoria.

Eight electric three car train sets were initially provided with third class seating in the outer cars and first class in the centre. Side passages ran along the train which enabled passengers to board at any door before finding a seat and improved the punctuality of the service. The first class accommodation was greater than the service required and the centre carriages were transferred to other lines. Two car units were coupled together to form two, four or six coach trains.

The first electric train ran experimentally on 17 January 1909 and in passenger service on 1 December 1909. It was marketed as the South London Elevated Electric Railway. The choice of name was influenced by the existing underground electric railways in London. The service was reported in The Times as quicker, in greater comfort and with cheaper fares. The Daily Mirror reported that journey times were cut from 36 to 24 minutes and services ran every 15 minutes. To coincide with the electric service the steam trains that shared the tracks between London Bridge and Peckham Rye were retimed and ran without stopping between those stations.

Steam trains continued to operate early morning services from 04:30 to 07:30 with all-day electric running introduced from 1 June 1912. Passenger numbers were restored to 8 million in 1910 and increased to 12 million in 1920.

Through service from Peckham Rye over the East London Railway ended in June 1911 and the link north of Old Kent Road was abandoned in 1913. Old Kent Road and South Bermondsey stations were closed and Sunday service was withdrawn from East Brixton on 1 January 1917, during the First World War. South Bermondsey reopened on 1 May 1919.

During overhead AC operation there were typically 68 down (London Bridge to Victoria) and 62 up trains on weekdays with some additional short workings.

=== Conversion to third-rail ===
After the creation of the Big Four railway companies, the LBSCR became part of the Southern Railway in 1923. Service was withdrawn for four months during the 1926 United Kingdom general strike.

The Southern had more miles of third-rail electrification than overhead line and decided to standardise their network with third-rail. The 660 V DC third-rail system was installed on 17 June 1928.

South Bermondsey station was relocated further south on 17 June 1928 with the island platform built on the site of the lifted third track.

Following conversion to third-rail DC operation there were typically 42 down (London Bridge to Victoria) and 41 up trains. This reduced the off-peak service to every 30 minutes and every 20 minutes at peak times. Trains were temporarily reduced to hourly during the Second World War.

=== Decline and rebirth under British Rail ===
The line became part of the Southern Region of British Railways in 1948.

In 1961 the remaining side platforms were demolished at Peckham Rye and replaced with an island platform built on the site of the long abandoned third track and platform. This was repeated at Queens Road Peckham in 1977 when an island platform was built on the site of the former third track and the side platforms were removed.

East Brixton station was closed from 6 January 1976. Sunday service was withdrawn from October 1976 with Wandsworth Road, Clapham, Queens Road Peckham and South Bermondsey stations closed on Sundays.

Saturday service was withdrawn in 1981. In May 1984 the weekday off-peak service was withdrawn.

The South London Line Travellers Association (SoLLTA) was set up in 1987 to lobby for improvements to the line. The service had been reduced to run every half hour only at Monday to Friday peak times. Clapham and Wandsworth Road stations, which were only served by the South London line service, were "reduced to primitive unstaffed halts so you can't even buy a ticket" according to SoLLTA.

The line was further reduced to an hourly peak service in June 1988. This gave a service of nine trains a day in each direction. In March 1989 Clapham station was given a 'worst station' award by The Daily Telegraph.

The SoLLTA campaign was successful. Clapham station was renamed Clapham High Street on 15 May 1989, to better reflect its location. It received renovation works in 1990. The other stations were cleaned and refurbished.

Restoration of all-day service was being considered in 1988 as part of a proposal to run a new service from Victoria to Lewisham and beyond. British Rail required a subsidy, but it could not be agreed with the local authorities. A Victoria to Dartford service to provide all day service on the South London line was still being considered in December 1989.

All day half-hourly service was restored from 13 May 1991. It was marketed under the name "South London Link" and a Saturday service was reinstated.

=== Privatisation ===
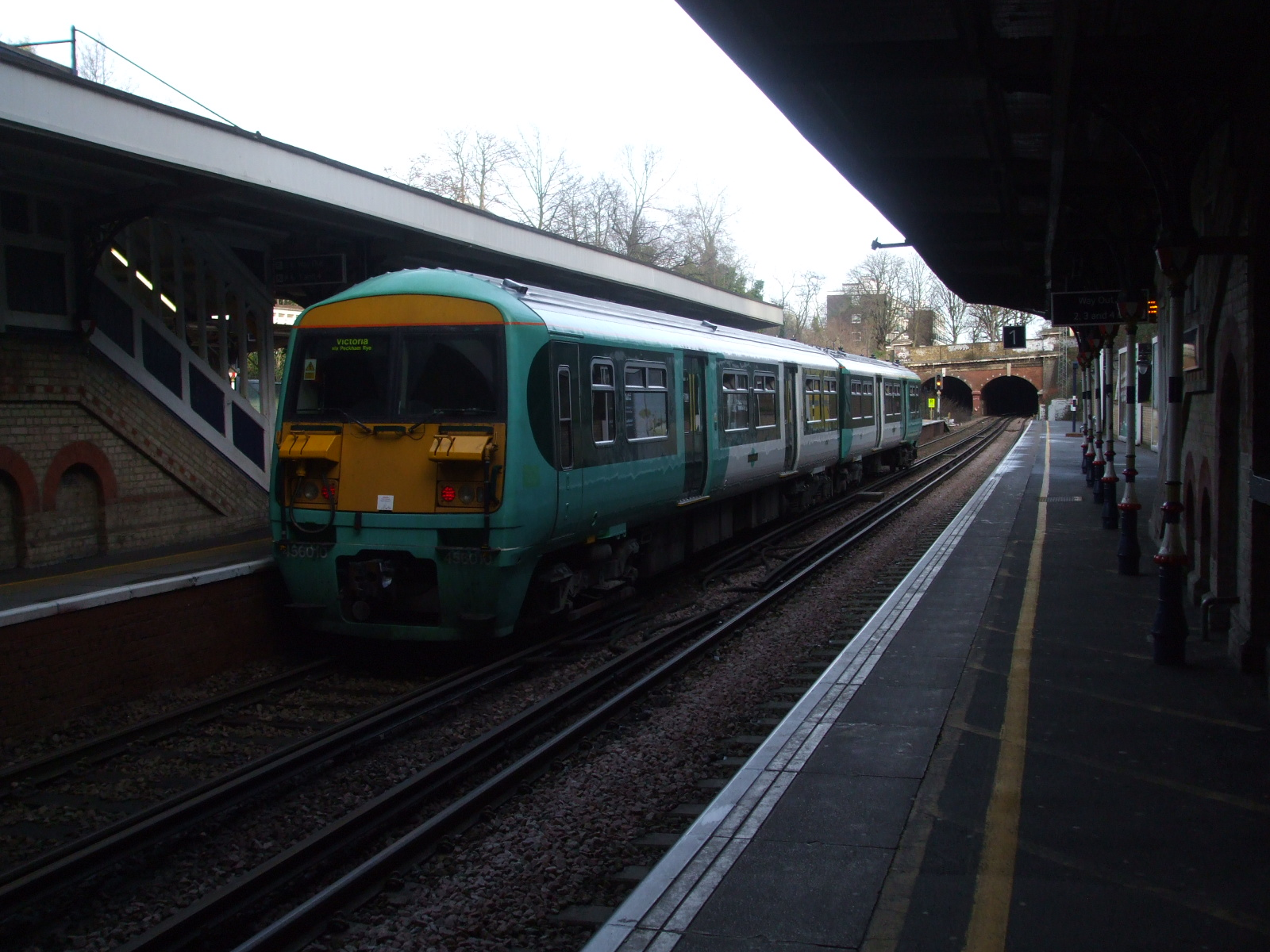
A Southern train at Denmark Hill in 2009

Following the privatisation of British Rail, passenger services on the line were provided by Connex South Central from 26 May 1996. The Sunday service was restored in September 1996 and weekday evening service increased from hourly to half-hourly from May 1997.

Southern (initially branded SouthCentral) operated passenger services from 26 August 2001 until 8 December 2012.

=== East London line extension ===
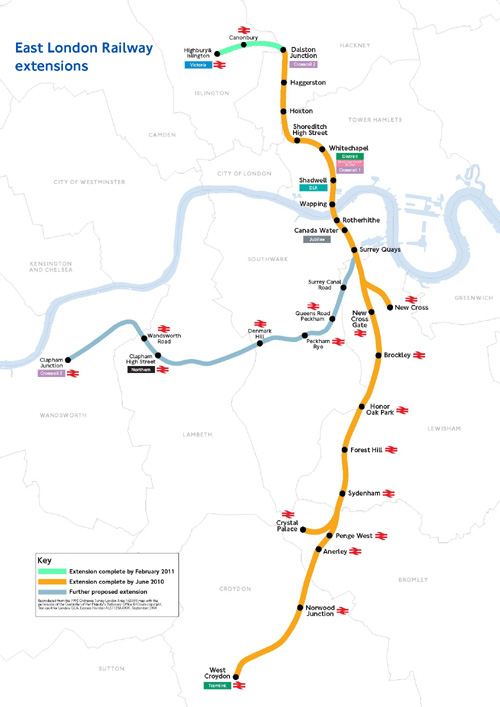
Map of the East London line extension

In 2012, most of the South London line service was incorporated into the London Overground network as part of the East London line extension to Clapham Junction. In the east this was achieved by constructing a 2.5-kilometre (1.6 mi) line from north of Queens Road Peckham station to join the East London line south of Surrey Quays, reinstating an alignment that had been abandoned since 1911. Passenger service was diverted west of Wandsworth Road to serve Clapham Junction. This created the route from Surrey Quays to Clapham Junction via Queens Road Peckham, Peckham Rye, Denmark Hill, Clapham High Street and Wandsworth Road that could be served by the London Overground. Completion was scheduled for May 2012 in time for the London 2012 Summer Olympic and Paralympic Games. This was not achieved as the line opened on 9 December 2012. The service connected with the West London line at Clapham Junction, completing an orbital rail route around Central London and fulfilling the Orbirail concept.

The start of London Overground service to Clapham Junction coincided with the withdrawal of the Southern Victoria–London Bridge service. The change reduced or eliminated direct services to the terminals from some stations.

== Route ==
The South London line diverges from the London Bridge branch of the Brighton Main Line at South Bermondsey junction on a brick viaduct. The track curves to go from a southeastwards to a southwestwards alignment. South Bermondsey, on an embankment, is the first station immediately south of the junction. The line is joined at Old Kent Road junction by the East London line from Surrey Quays. The line passes the site of the former Old Kent Road station south of the junction and then there is a station at Queens Road Peckham. After passing under the Catford Loop Line the line reaches Peckham Rye where the alignment switches to westwards. The South London line serves the southern pair of four platforms at Peckham Rye station.

After Peckham Rye, the Portsmouth line diverges to the southwest at Peckham Rye junction. Crofton Road junction a little further west allows Catford Loop Line trains to join the South London line, which from this point is also known as the Atlantic lines. After the Grove Lane tunnel, the next station is Denmark Hill where the South London line serves the southern pair of four platforms. The line passes over the Holborn Viaduct–Herne Hill line at Loughborough Junction station and then through the site of the former East Brixton station. The line passes over the Chatham Main Line at Brixton station and has a junction with it at Shepherds Lane. The line heads in a northwestward direction in a shallow cutting. There is a station at Clapham High Street. Voltaire Road junction allows trains to switch between the Atlantic and Chatham lines.

There is a station at Wandsworth Road and then the line splits into three routes. The first route is the continuation of the Atlantic lines on a brick viaduct, then over the South West Main Line at Queenstown Road and on to Battersea Park station where the route terminates following the removal of the Battersea Park junction with the Victoria branch of the Brighton Main Line. The second route is the connection to Clapham Junction station and the third route is a connection to the Chatham Main Line.

Diagrams of the South London line route

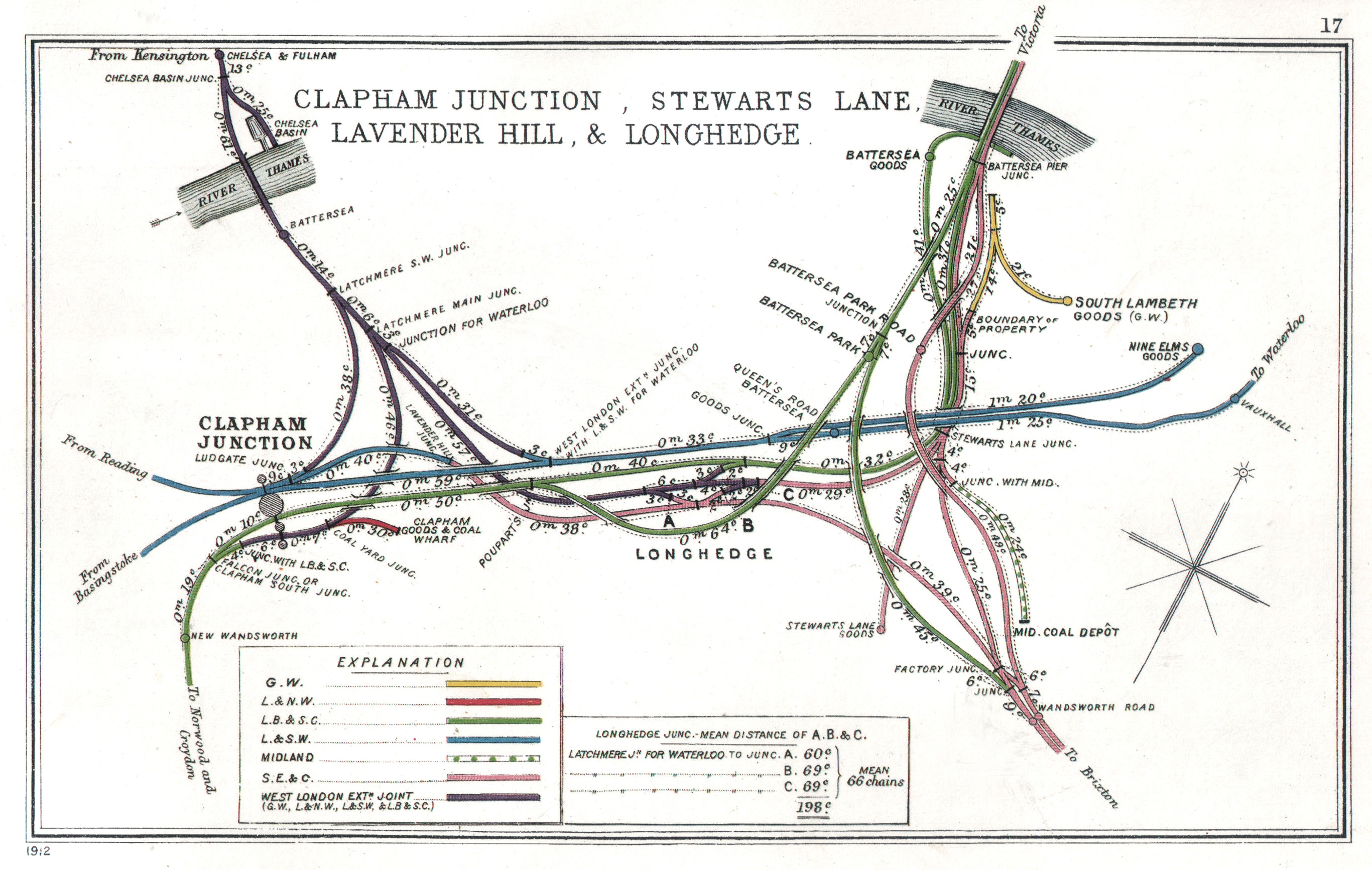
Victoria to Wandsworth Road (1912)

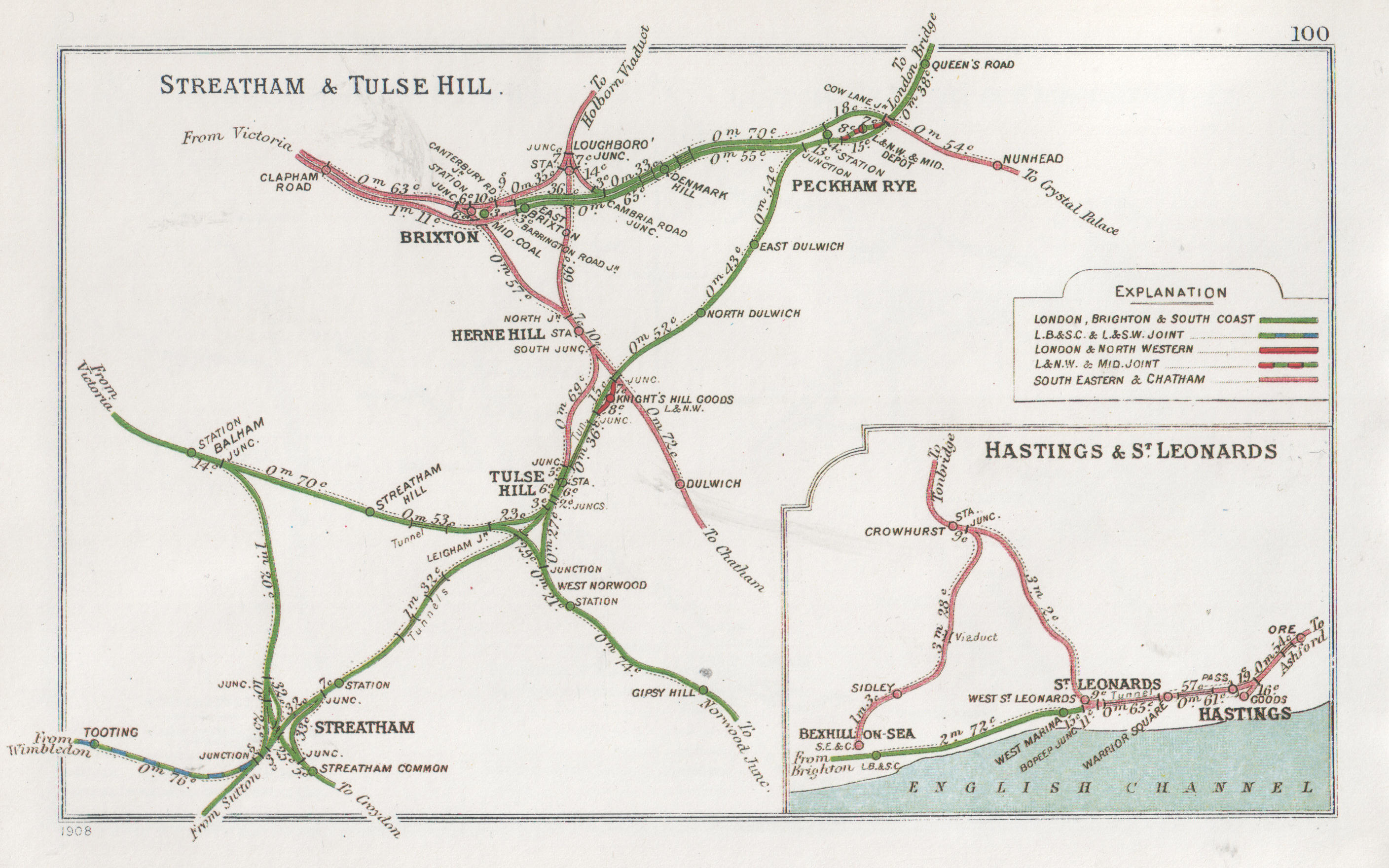
Wandsworth Road to Queens Road Peckham (1908)

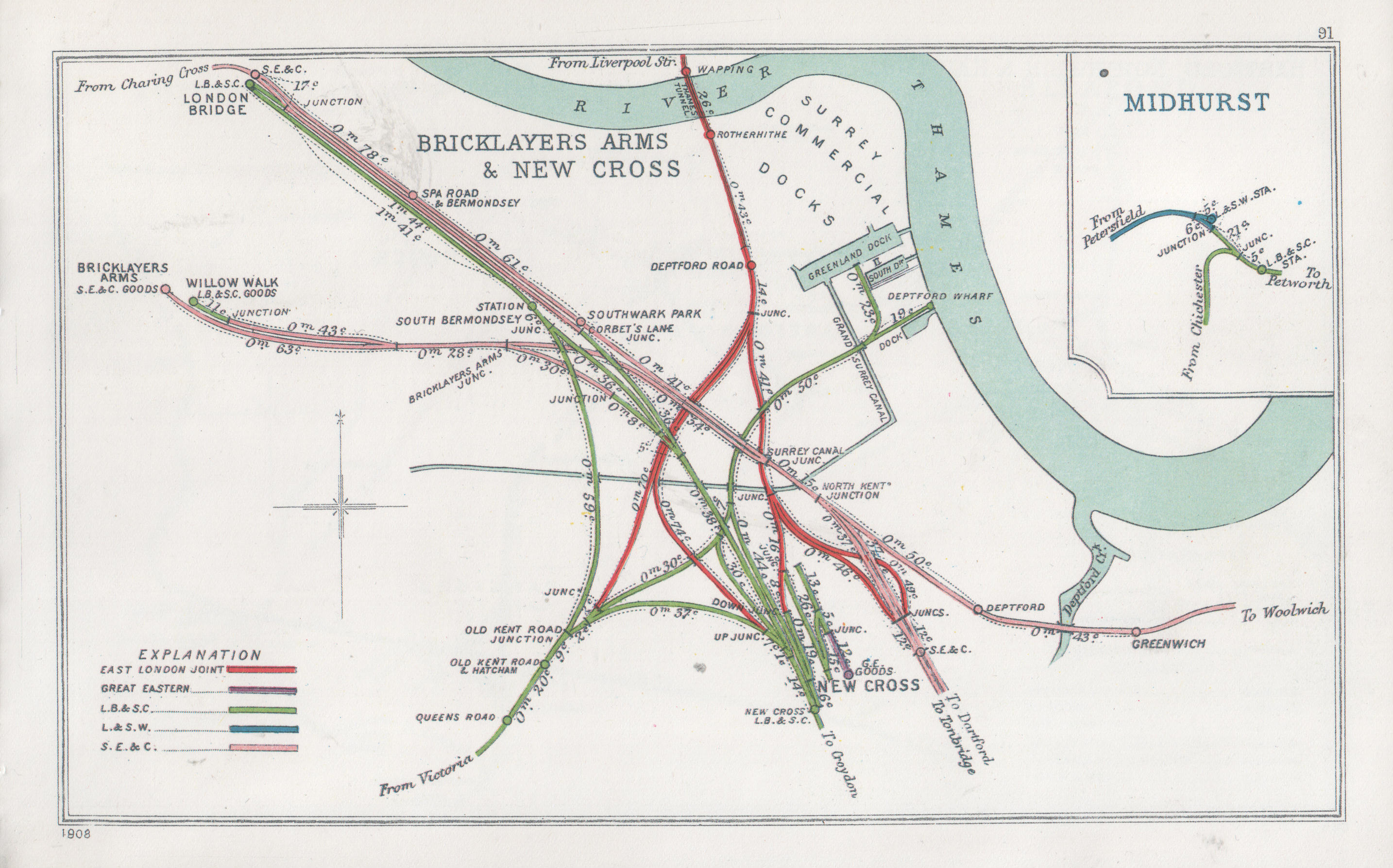
Queens Road Peckham to London Bridge (1908)

== Services ==
The combined East London and South London line service is described by Transport for London as the Highbury & Islington to New Cross, Clapham Junction, Crystal Palace and West Croydon route. As of the December 2023 timetable the typical off-peak service pattern is 16 trains per hour, of which the following run over the South London line for part of the journey:

Route	tph	Calling at
Dalston Junction to Clapham Junction	4	Haggerston; Hoxton; Shoreditch High Street; Whitechapel; Shadwell; Wapping; Rotherhithe; Canada Water; Surrey Quays; Queens Road Peckham; Peckham Rye; Denmark Hill; Clapham High Street; Wandsworth Road

As of the December 2023 timetable, there are typically four off-peak Southern trains an hour between London Bridge and Peckham Rye calling at South Bermondsey and Queens Road Peckham that continue via the Portsmouth line.

=== Renaming ===
In July 2023, TfL announced that it would be giving each of the six Overground services unique names by the end of the following year. In February 2024, it was confirmed that the East London / South London section would be named the Windrush line (to honour the Windrush generation of immigrants to the area from the Caribbean) and would be coloured red on the updated network map.

== Proposed developments ==
=== Addition of New Bermondsey station ===
The East London line extension plans of 2001 proposed a new station at Surrey Canal Road near the Bermondsey/New Cross border. A campaign group was formed in 2009 by Bermondsey residents to press for funding to be made available. In September 2010, the £7 million funding was refused by the Department for Transport, which Property developer Renewal in 2012 agreed to fund as part of a development scheme and Lewisham Council accordingly granted planning permission. During a presentation at the site as part of the Open House 2014 weekend, Renewal announced a process of choosing a more recognisable name was underway with TfL. The decision reached for this part of the former south London dockyards is New Bermondsey. Construction work began in 2016.

=== Victoria to Bellingham service ===
The removal of the Victoria to London Bridge service in 2012 eliminated a single seat ride from some South London line stations to the terminals. A demonstration took place to restore the route during the month when the route changed. A survey by London Travelwatch found that 88% of passengers on the line felt they would be inconvenienced by the changes (although the survey also noted that respondents were generally unaware of the East London line/Overground proposals or of any possible benefits they might bring).

To compensate for the loss of services, it was proposed to introduce a Victoria-Bellingham service. This would restore the old route to Peckham Rye and take in part of the Catford Loop Line, to Bellingham in south-east London. The proposal was abandoned due to funding issues.

Pressure groups and local MPs urged the Mayor to reconsider who secured funding in principle from the Secretary of State for Transport for greater line use or branches to be added. TfL compiled a shortlist of proposals to address the upset in commuting times.

=== Lobbying for further additional stations ===
Between Denmark Hill and Clapham High Street, the line passes through Brixton, crossing over Loughborough Junction and Brixton stations but without its own stations. In 1991, adding platforms at Brixton was identified as a potential revenue generator for the South Central division, but the cost to build was considered prohibitively expensive.

In 2004, concerns were raised by local politicians and residents that the Brixton area was not being served by the line and campaigners criticised the East London line Extension project for missing opportunities to create interchange stations with Thameslink and the London Underground Victoria line.

Plans were not produced for such stations as the line is on a high viaduct, increasing the costs prohibitively. The Mayor of London, Ken Livingstone, expressed doubts that any proposals to construct these stations would pass a cost-benefit analysis and that they would be unlikely to be approved. Lambeth Council and the East London line Group have expressed support for an interchange station at Brixton and have requested that this proposal be considered for future funding. Suggestions have been made that East Brixton station, closed in 1976, could be re-opened as an alternative.
