= Queens Road Peckham railway station =

British railway station

Queens Road Peckham
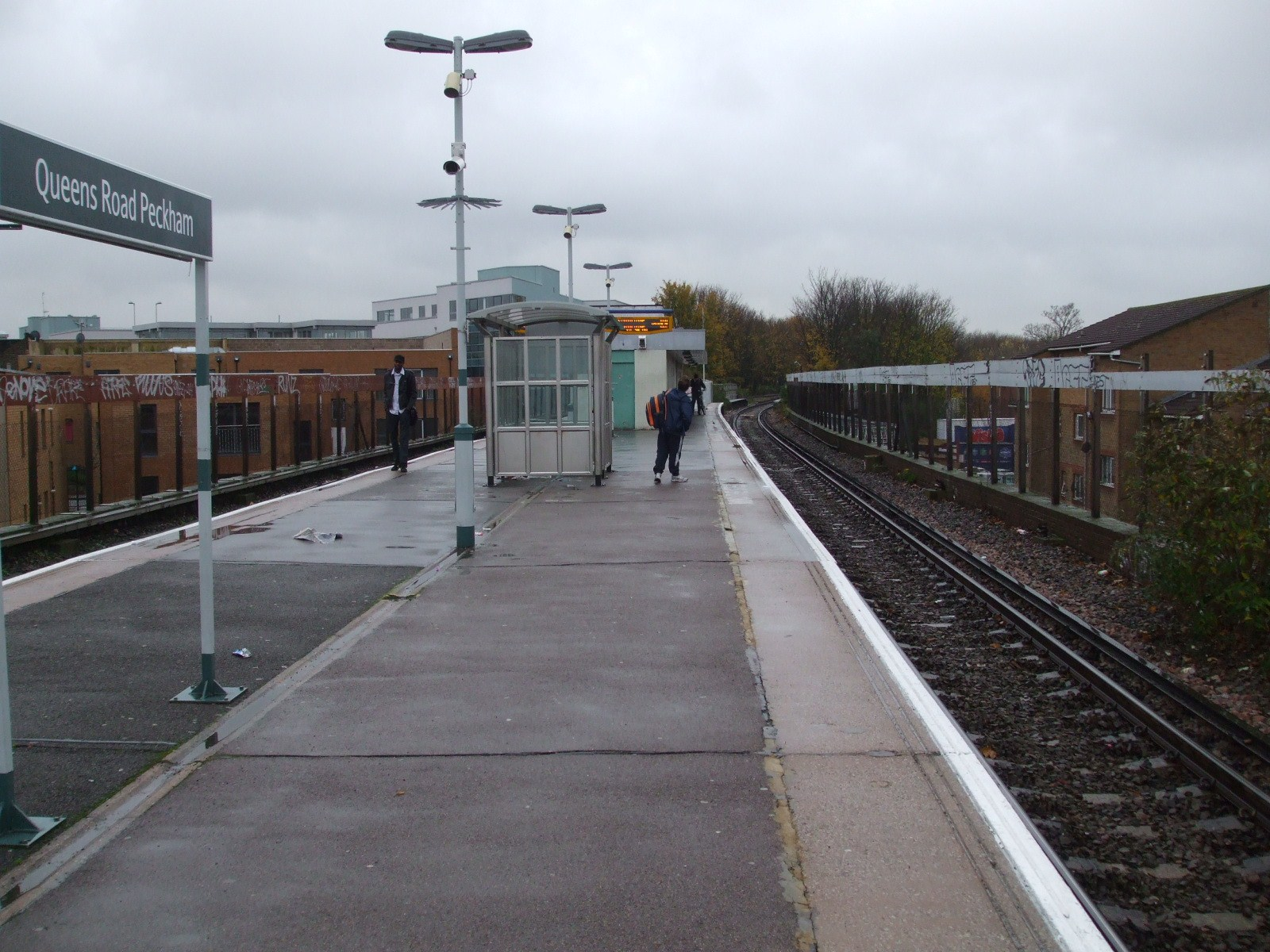
- Interactive map of Queens Road Peckham

General information
- Location: Peckham
- Local authority: London Borough of Southwark
- Managed by: Southern
- Station code: QRP
- DfT category: E
- Number of platforms: 2
- Accessible: Yes
- Fare zone: 2

National Rail annual entry and exit
- 2020–21: ▼1.091 million
- 2021–22: ▲2.183 million
- 2022–23: ▲2.580 million
- 2023–24: ▲2.748 million
- 2024–25: ▲2.915 million
- Interchange: 13,021

Railway companies
- Original company: London, Brighton and South Coast Railway

Key dates
- 13 August 1866: Opened

Other information
- External links: Departures; Facilities
- Coordinates: 51.4736°N 0.0573°W

Queens Road Peckham is an interchange station between the Windrush line of the London Overground and National Rail services operated by Southern, located in Peckham in the London Borough of Southwark. It is on the South London line, 2 miles 58 chains (4.4 km) from London Bridge, and is in London fare zone 2.

== History ==
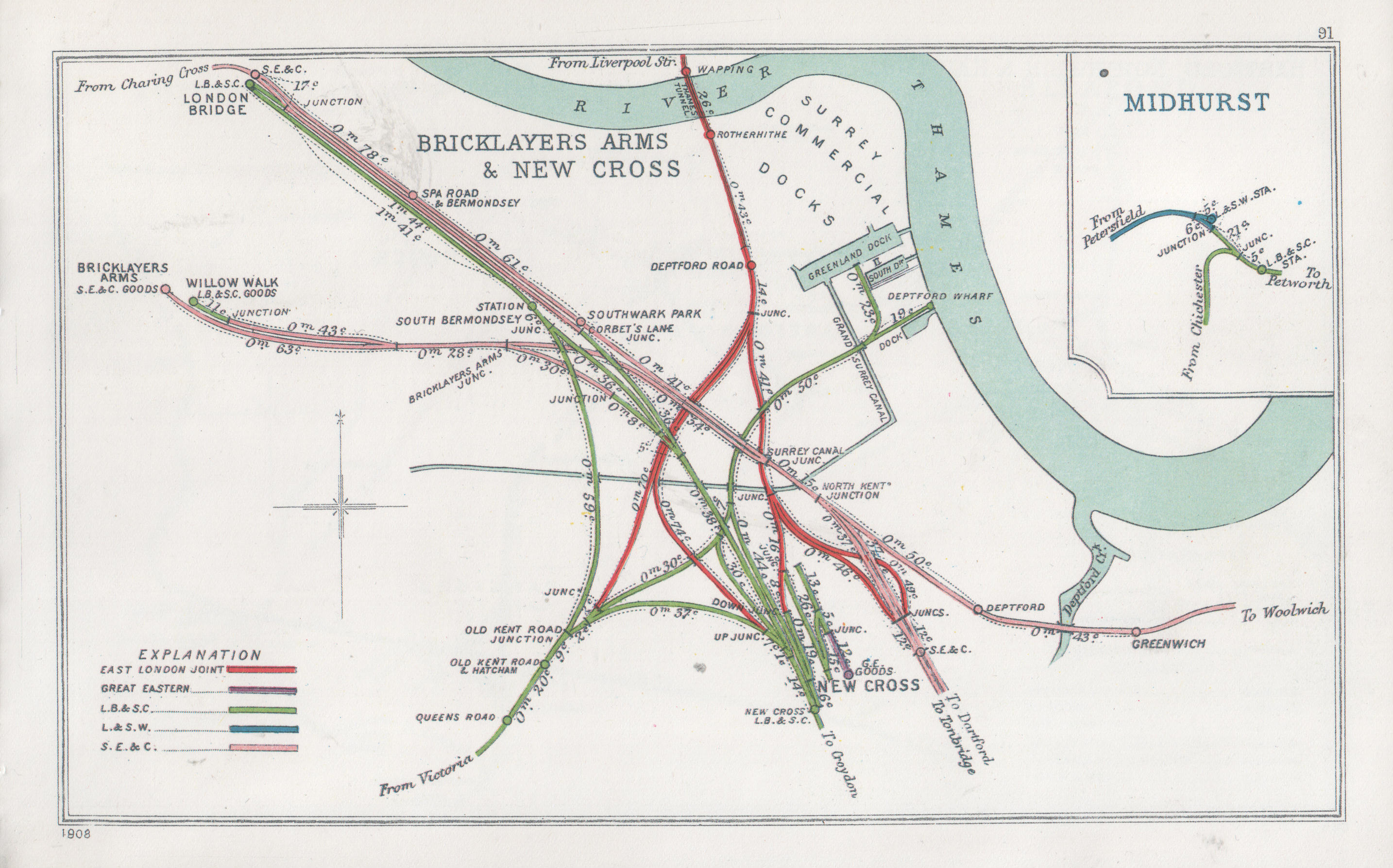
A 1908 Railway Clearing House map of lines around the approaches to London Bridge.

The station opened with the line on 13 August 1866, and had two wooden side platforms and an intermediate centre platform to serve the third centre line.

Until 1911 passenger trains ran to the East London line, stopping at Old Kent Road. This link was re-instated on 9 December 2012 by London Overground.

The present island platform dates from the 1970s which is on a viaduct with the line: there are 48 steps leading to it, and one block of platform buildings.

== Design ==
The station has step free access from platform to street via a lift. A ramp is required for wheelchair access to and from the train.

The station exits on to Queens Road in Peckham.

== Services ==
Queens Road Peckham is on the Windrush line of the London Overground, with services operated using Class 378 EMUs. Additional services are operated by Southern using Class 377 EMUs.

The typical off-peak service in trains per hour is:

- 4 tph to London Bridge
- 4 tph to Dalston Junction via Surrey Quays (Windrush line)
- 2 tph to East Croydon via Norbury
- 2 tph to Beckenham Junction via Crystal Palace
- 4 tph to Clapham Junction (Windrush line)

A small number of London Overground services are extended beyond Dalston Junction to and from Highbury & Islington. The station is also served by one train per day to and two trains per day from Battersea Park.

During the evenings (after approximately 20:00), the service between London Bridge and Beckenham Junction is reduced to hourly. This service does not run on Sundays.

Preceding station	National Rail	Following station
South Bermondsey	Southern South London Line	Peckham Rye
Preceding station	London Overground	Following station
Peckham Rye towards Clapham Junction	Windrush line South London line	Surrey Quays towards Dalston Junction

== Connections ==
London Buses routes 36, 136, 171, 177, 436, P12 and P13 and night routes N89, N136 and N171 serve the station.
