= East Brixton railway station =

Abandoned station in London

East Brixton
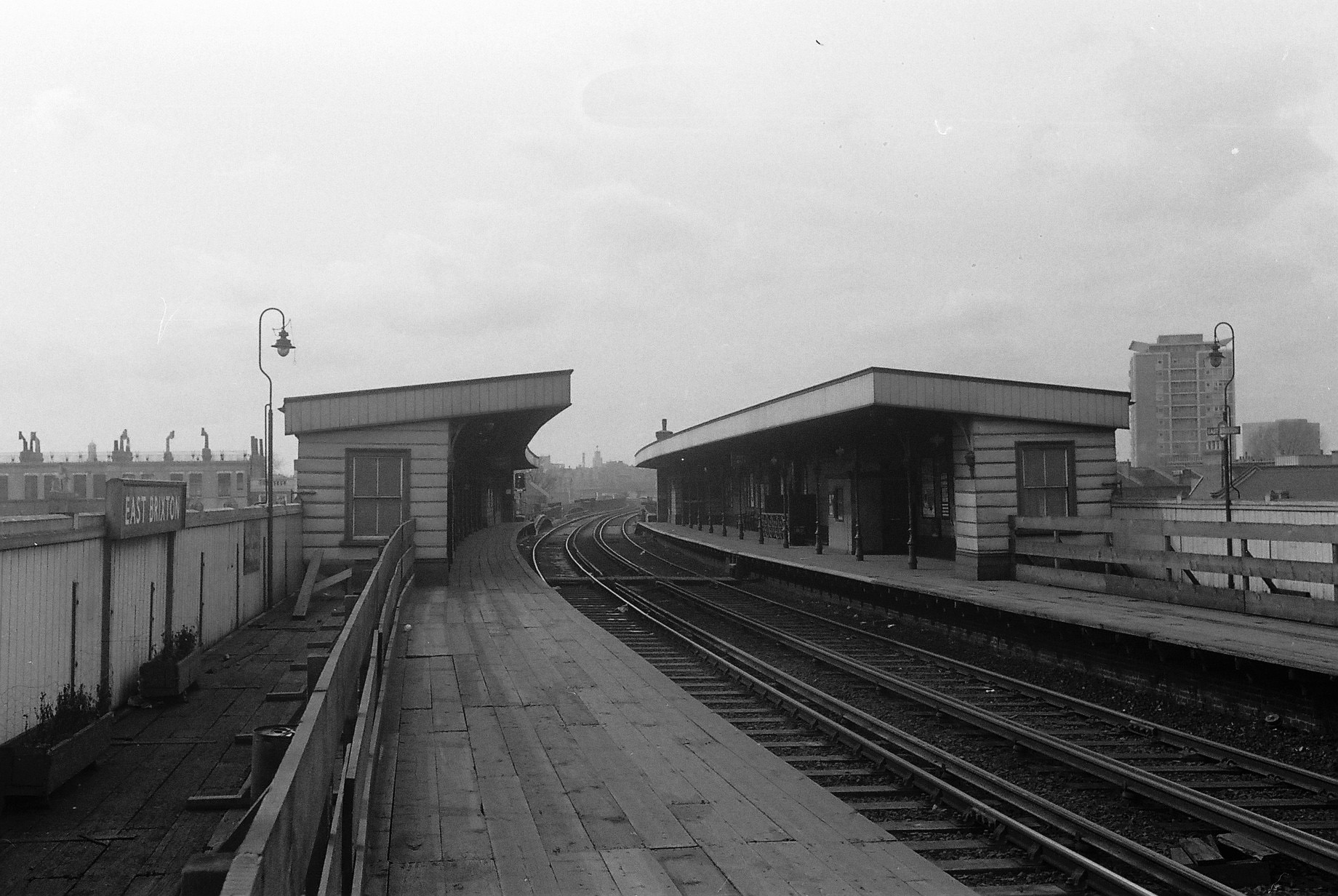
- Station platforms facing west in 1963
- Interactive map of East Brixton

General information
- Location: Brixton, London, England
- Local authority: Lambeth
- Grid reference: TQ314756
- Number of platforms: 2

Railway companies
- Original company: London, Brighton & South Coast Railway
- Pre-grouping: London, Brighton & South Coast Railway
- Post-grouping: Southern Railway

Key dates
- 13 August 1866: Opened as Loughborough Park
- 1 January 1870: Renamed Loughborough Park and Brixton
- 1 January 1894: Renamed East Brixton
- 5 January 1976: Closed by British Rail

Other information
- Coordinates: 51.4636°N 0.1073°W

East Brixton railway station was a railway station in Brixton, south London. It was opened as Loughborough Park by the London, Brighton & South Coast Railway in 1866. Regular passenger service was the South London line from London Victoria to London Bridge terminal stations in central London. Initially provided with a steam passenger service, competition from electric trams caused a conversion to overhead line electric operation in 1909. The station became part of the Southern Railway in 1923 and overhead line electrification was swapped for third rail in 1928.

The station lost patronage after the opening of Brixton Underground station in 1971. There was a fire at the station in 1975 and it was closed by British Rail in January 1976. The station was located to the east side of the southernmost rail bridge over Barrington Road, near Coldharbour Lane. Since 2012 London Overground trains pass through the site of the former station without stopping and there has been some campaigning to reopen it.

== History ==
The inner south London suburb of Brixton in the parish of Lambeth was connected to central London by rail on 25 August 1862 when Brixton and South Stockwell railway station was opened by the London, Chatham and Dover Railway (LCDR) on the line from Victoria through Brixton to Herne Hill. East Brixton station was opened on 13 August 1866 by the London, Brighton & South Coast Railway (LBSCR) as Loughborough Park. It consisted of two platforms with wooden buildings on high piers next to the railway viaduct. Initially the station was the western terminus of the steam passenger service from London Bridge. Through service was established to Victoria on 1 May 1867. The next station to the east was Denmark Hill and the next station to the west was Clapham (now called Clapham High Street).

In 1870 the station was renamed Loughborough Park and Brixton, before it was finally renamed East Brixton in 1894.

The station was included in a proposal published in 1905 by the Australian engineer Elfric Wells Chalmers Kearney for an underground monorail-type railway. The plans for the Kearney High-Speed Railway envisaged running a tube line from Cricklewood via central London, Brixton and Herne Hill to Crystal Palace, but were never realised.

The popularity of the service was threatened by the development of the electric tram network and the line through the station converted to electric operation in 1909, powered by overhead line.

Sunday service was withdrawn during the First World War, on 1 January 1917 and was not restored until 12 July 1925.

In 1923 the LBSCR was grouped into the Southern Railway. The Southern Railway had more miles of third rail track than overhead line so in 1928 the electric traction system on the route was switched.

After nationalisation of the railways the line and station became part of the Southern Region of British Railways.

East Brixton station made a brief appearance in the 1948 comedy film A Date with a Dream. It is seen in the background of a scene in which two soldiers (played by Len Lowe and Bill Lowe) walk along Barrington Road.

Over the years the station became progressively neglected and lost passengers from 1971 when Brixton Underground station opened nearby as the southern terminus of the new Victoria line. With declining passenger numbers and the station requiring extensive repairs to the wooden platforms and buildings it was decided that the expense was not justified. There was a fire in 1975 which temporarily closed the station but the station reopened and was finally closed on 5 January 1976. The platforms and its buildings were demolished shortly after closure. Nothing now remains of the station at track level, although there are some arches and windows in the viaduct of the still used line.

== Reopening proposals ==
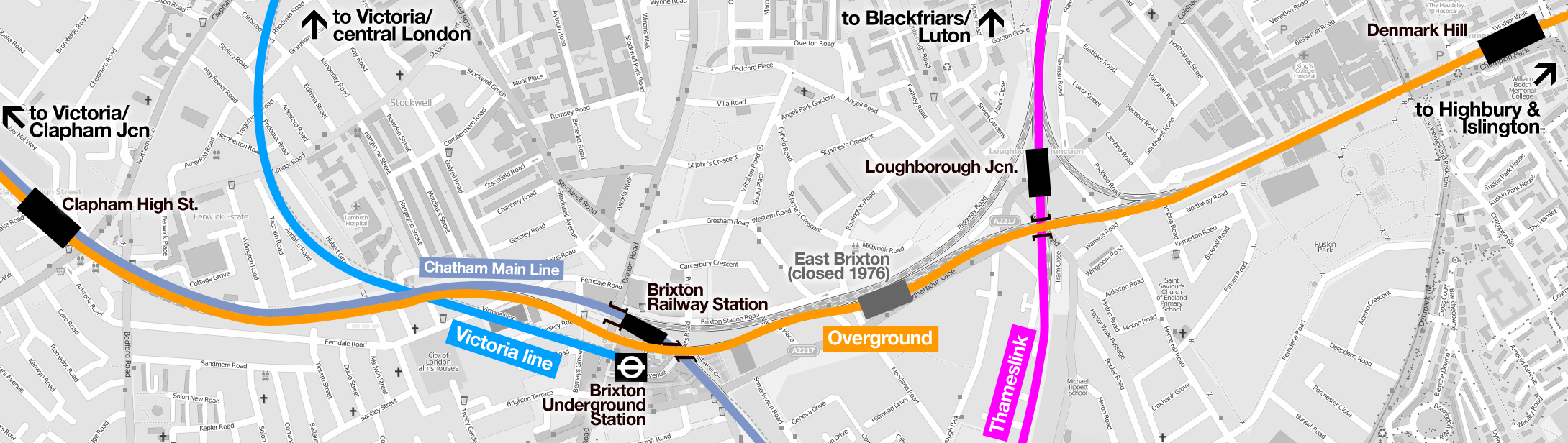
Map of rail & tube lines passing through Brixton, showing the location of East Brixton

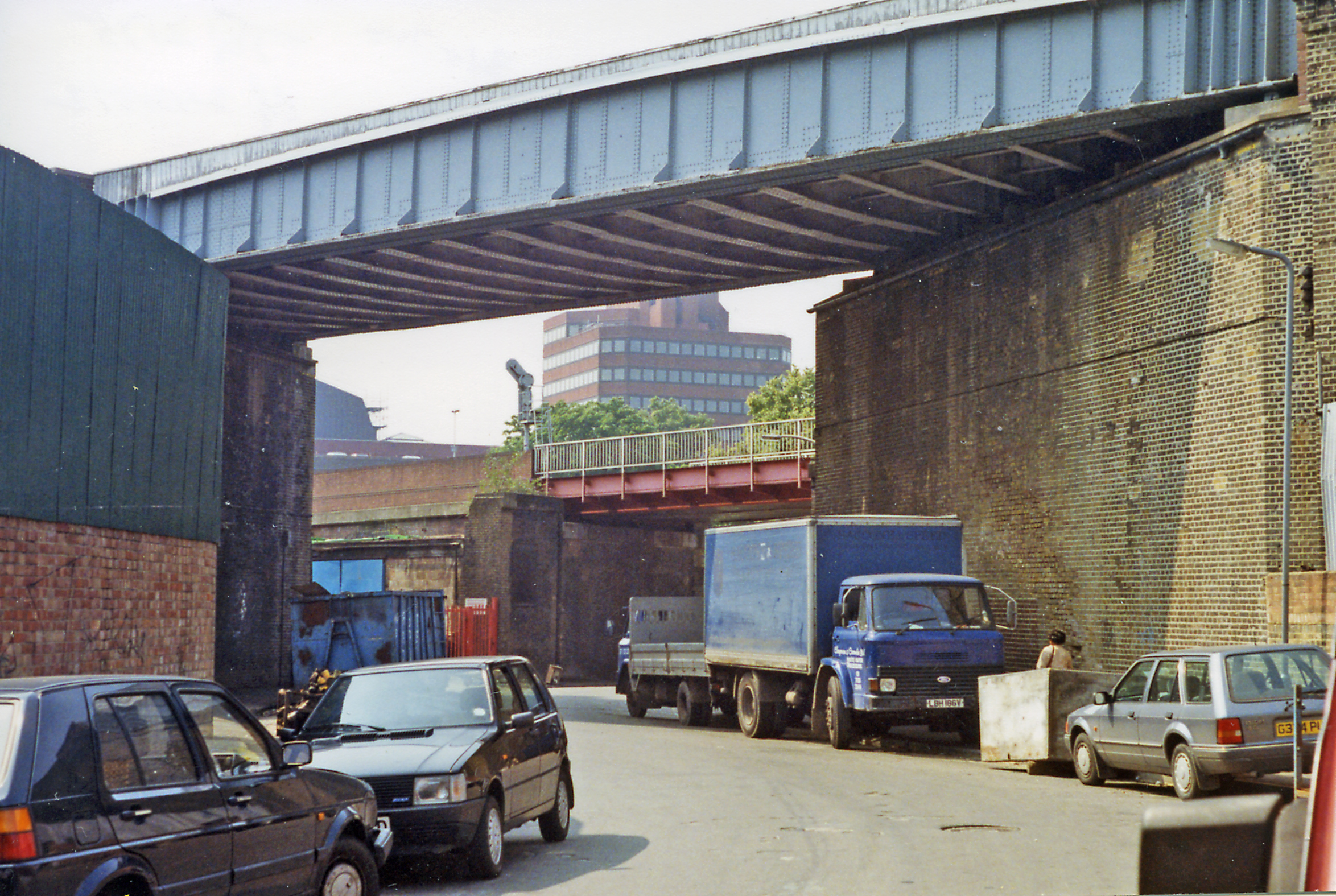
View northward on Valentia Place, Brixton, under the South London line; the former East Brixton station site is just east of this location (right).

In 2012, most of the South London Line service was incorporated into the London Overground network as part of the East London line extension project. Trains now run from Clapham Junction to Wandsworth Road, follow the same route to Queens Road Peckham, then join the East London line core route at Surrey Quays. This service runs through Brixton, East Brixton and Loughborough Junction without stopping. The plans were criticised for missed opportunities to create new interchange stations with Thameslink and the Victoria line. No stations are planned at these locations as the line is on high railway arches, making the cost of any station construction prohibitive.

In 2014 it was suggested that a re-opened East Brixton station could provide a form of interchange with the Victoria line and Thameslink as it would be located almost exactly in the middle of the two lines. This was the subject of a petition to parliament.

In March 2017, Lambeth Council started a review to see if there was a business case for reopening the station, working with Transport for London and Network Rail.

In August 2017, Labour’s Florence Eshalomi MP and Conservative member of the London Assembly, Andrew Boff, called for the station to be re-opened.

In August 2018, the Liberal Democrats’ Caroline Pidgeon called for the reopening of East Brixton, by launching a petition.

In May 2022, James Bryan, the Labour Councillor for Brixton North (the ward which encompasses the former railway station) made the case for the station to be reopened.

== Maps ==
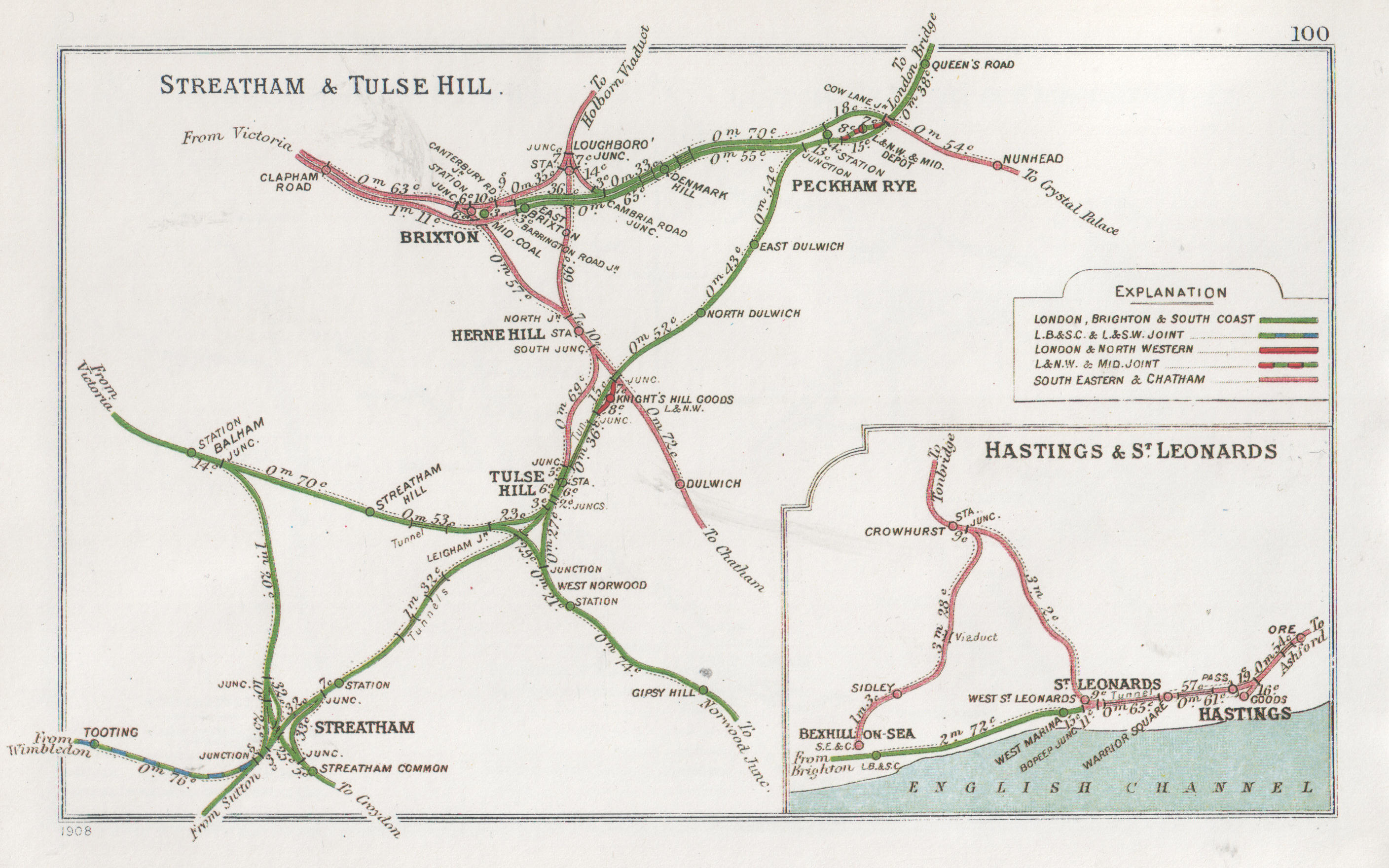
A 1908 Railway Clearing House map of lines around East Brixton railway station

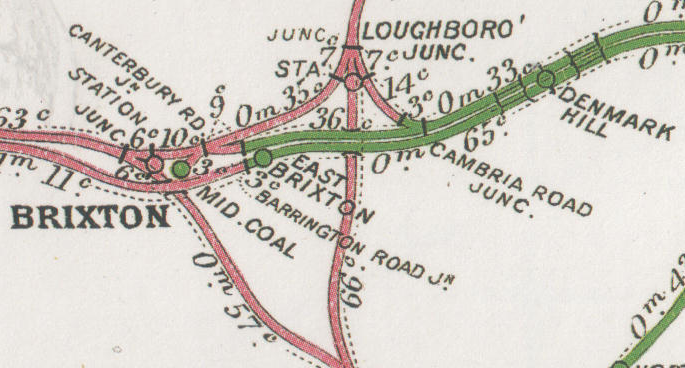
1914 railway junction diagram showing the former East Brixton Station

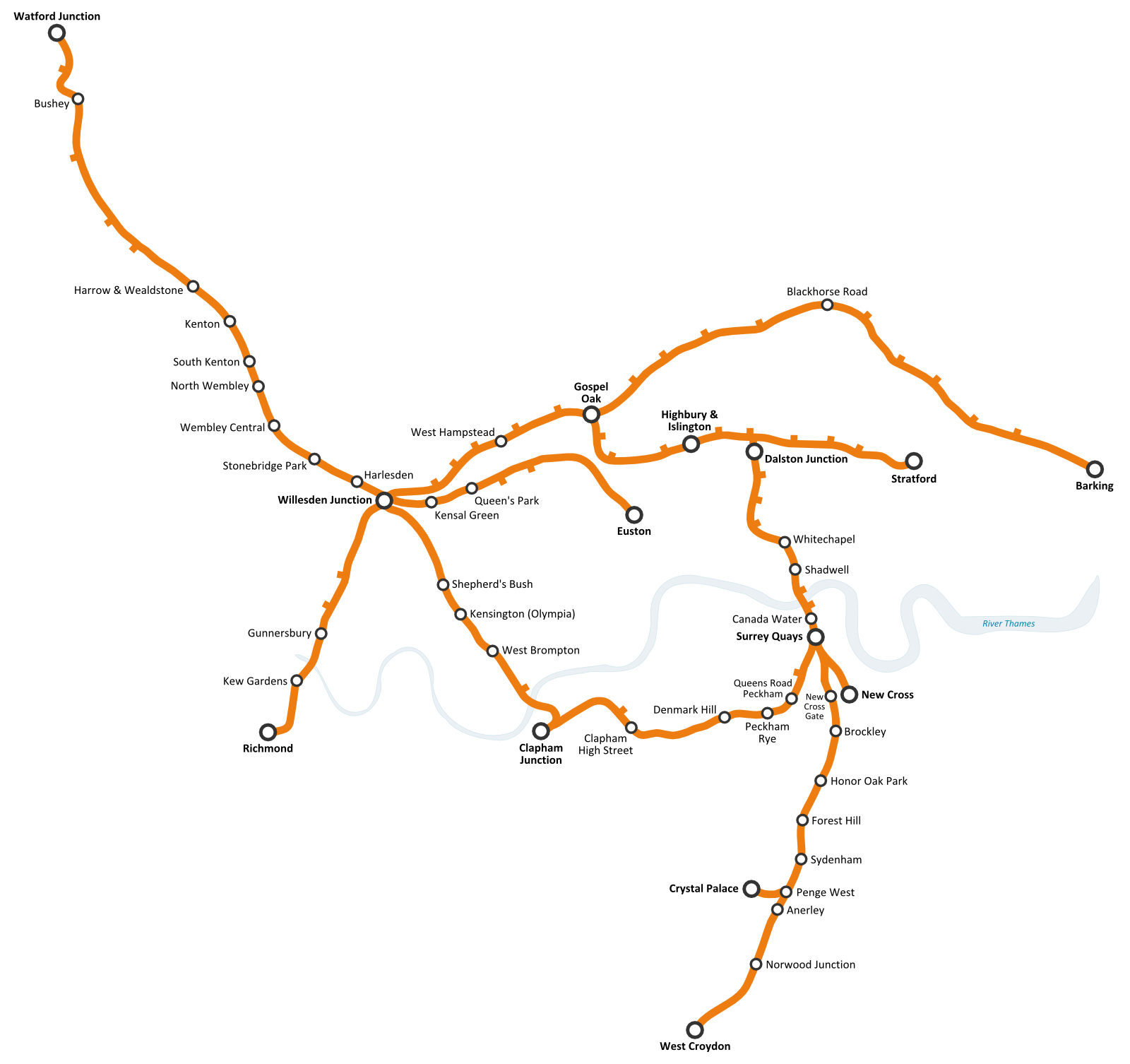
The London Overground network; East Brixton is between Denmark Hill and Clapham High St

Preceding station	Disused railways	Following station
Clapham High Street	British Rail; Southern Region; South London Line	Denmark Hill
