= Windrush line =

Railway service in London

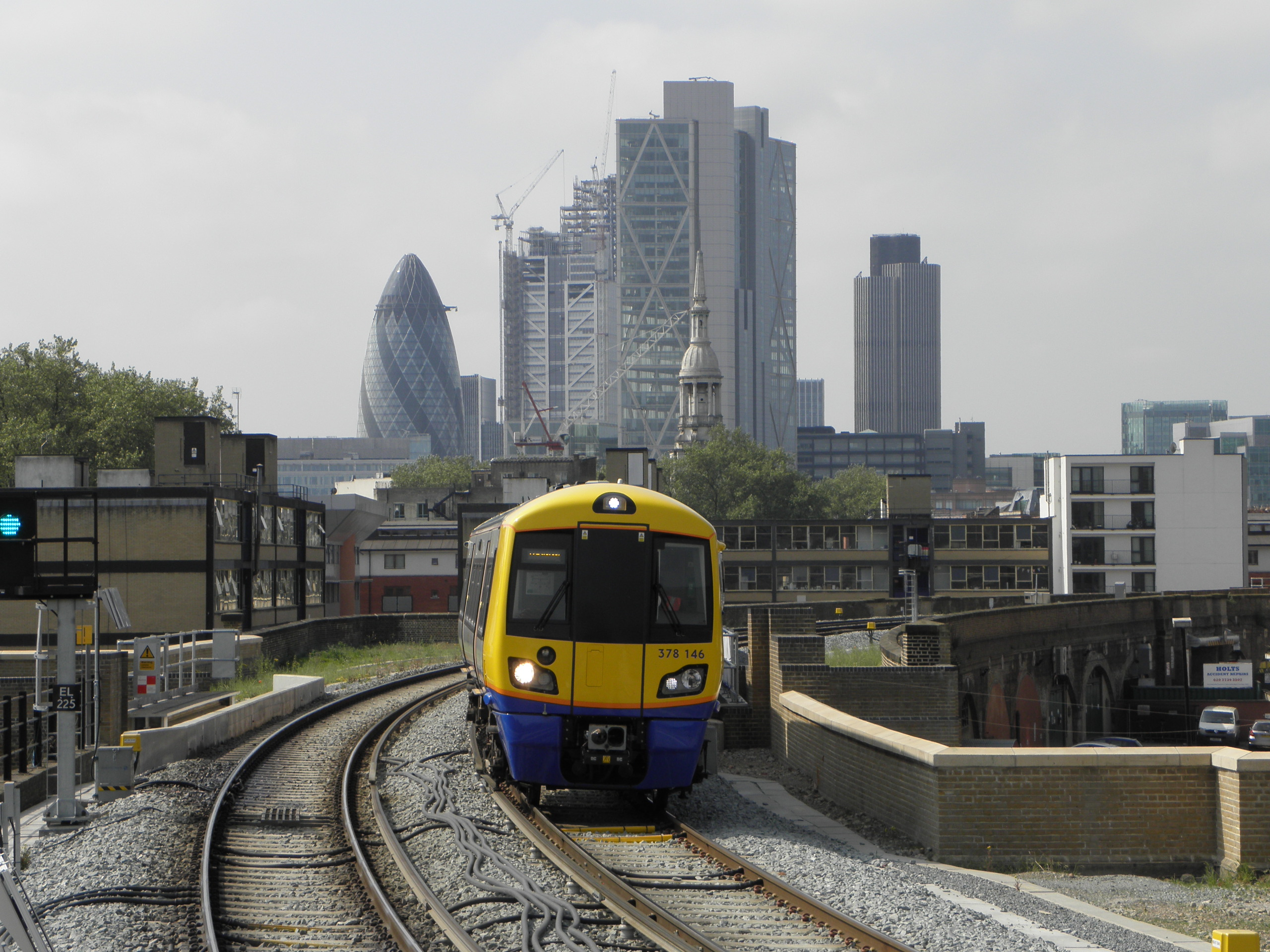
- Class 378 train at Hoxton, with the City of London skyline in background

Overview
- Status: Operational
- Owner: Transport for London (TfL); Network Rail
- Locale: Greater London
- Termini: Highbury & Islington Dalston Junction; New Cross Crystal Palace West Croydon Clapham Junction Battersea Park
- Stations: 30

Service
- Type: Suburban rail, Rapid Transit
- System: National Rail
- Services: 6
- Operator: London Overground
- Depot: New Cross Gate
- Rolling stock: Class 378 Capitalstar

History
- Opened: 1933 to 2007 (As East London Line); 27 April 2010 (preview service); 23 May 2010 (full service)

Technical
- Number of tracks: Double track; sections with four tracks
- Track gauge: 1,435 mm (4 ft 8 1/2 in) standard gauge
- Electrification: 750 V DC third rail
Route map
London Overground service

The Windrush line is the service operated by London Overground on the East London line and South London line, running north to south through East and South London. The East London line was previously a line of the London Underground. Prior to the name being adopted in November 2024, the service was labelled in Transport for London timetables as the "Highbury & Islington to New Cross, Clapham Junction, Crystal Palace and West Croydon route".

== History ==
=== Renaming ===
The name proposed for this service in 2015 was the East London line. In 2021, Sadiq Khan announced that if re-elected as Mayor of London, he would give the six services operated by London Overground unique names that would reflect London's diversity, working with his Commission for Diversity in the Public Realm. In July 2023, TfL announced that it would be giving each of the six Overground services unique names by the end of the following year. In February 2024, it was confirmed that the East London / South London section would be named the Windrush line (to honour the Windrush generation of immigrants to the area from the Caribbean) and would be coloured red on the updated network map.

The Empire Windrush was a passenger vessel that arrived at Tilbury, in Essex, in 1948 bringing migrants to the UK from what was then the British West Indies. Before 1948, there were several areas in the UK, such as Canning Town in London, and Tiger Bay in Cardiff that had a black presence, but the arrival of the Windrush is seen as a watershed, after which point black people would form a much larger part of the community.

== Services ==
As of May 2025, the typical off-peak service pattern is:

East London and South London lines (Windrush line)
Route	tph	Calling at
Dalston Junction to New Cross	4	Haggerston; Hoxton; Shoreditch High Street; Whitechapel; Shadwell; Wapping; Rotherhithe; Canada Water; Surrey Quays
Dalston Junction to Clapham Junction	4	Haggerston; Hoxton; Shoreditch High Street; Whitechapel; Shadwell; Wapping; Rotherhithe; Canada Water; Surrey Quays; Queens Road Peckham; Peckham Rye; Denmark Hill; Clapham High Street; Wandsworth Road
Highbury & Islington to Crystal Palace	4	Canonbury; Dalston Junction; Haggerston; Hoxton; Shoreditch High Street; Whitechapel; Shadwell; Wapping; Rotherhithe; Canada Water; Surrey Quays; New Cross Gate; Brockley; Honor Oak Park; Forest Hill; Sydenham
Highbury & Islington to West Croydon	4	Canonbury; Dalston Junction; Haggerston; Hoxton; Shoreditch High Street, Whitechapel; Shadwell; Wapping; Rotherhithe; Canada Water; Surrey Quays; New Cross Gate; Brockley; Honor Oak Park; Forest Hill; Sydenham; Penge West; Anerley; Norwood Junction

On weekends, the Windrush Line operates overnight services between Highbury & Islington and New Cross Gate stations, with a frequency of four trains per hour.

A few Windrush line trains on the South London line arm terminate at Battersea Park station instead of Clapham Junction station in the mornings and evenings. These operate as parliamentary trains.

== Route map ==
London Overground network
Schematic map of the London Overground network

Geographic map showing London Overground
