= Denmark Hill railway station =

National rail station in London, England

Denmark Hill
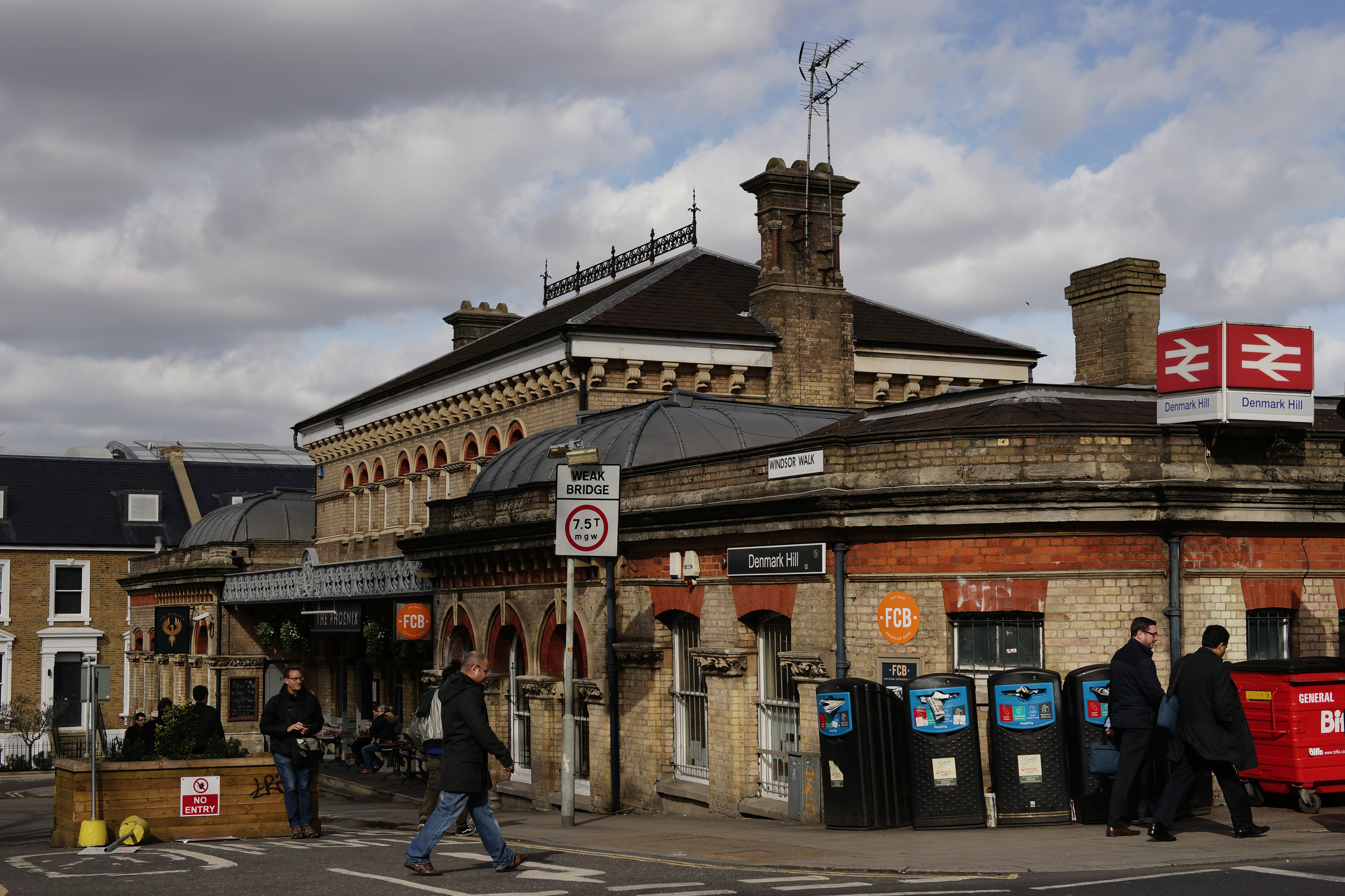
- Interactive map of Denmark Hill

General information
- Location: Denmark Hill
- Local authority: London Borough of Southwark
- Managed by: Thameslink
- Station code: DMK
- DfT category: D
- Number of platforms: 4
- Accessible: Yes
- Fare zone: 2

National Rail annual entry and exit
- 2020–21: ▼2.343 million
- Interchange: ▼0.182 million
- 2021–22: ▲4.597 million
- Interchange: ▲0.380 million
- 2022–23: ▲5.554 million
- Interchange: ▲0.483 million
- 2023–24: ▲5.814 million
- Interchange: ▲0.504 million
- 2024–25: ▲6.020 million
- Interchange: ▲1.262 million

Railway companies
- Original company: London, Brighton & South Coast Railway

Key dates
- 1 December 1865: Opened (LCDR)
- 13 August 1866: Opened (LBSCR)

Listed status
- Listed feature: Denmark Hill Station, cutting walls and platforms, with Phoenix and Firkin public house
- Listing grade: Grade II listed
- Entry number: 1386053
- Added to list: 17 September 1998

Other information
- External links: Departures; Facilities
- Coordinates: 51.4683°N 0.0894°W

Denmark Hill is an interchange station between the Windrush line of the London Overground and National Rail services on the Catford loop line, located in Denmark Hill in South London. It is 4 miles 22 chains (6.9 km) down the line from London Victoria. The station is located in London fare zone 2 and is managed by Thameslink. The station receives services operated by Southeastern and Thameslink in addition to the London Overground.

== History ==
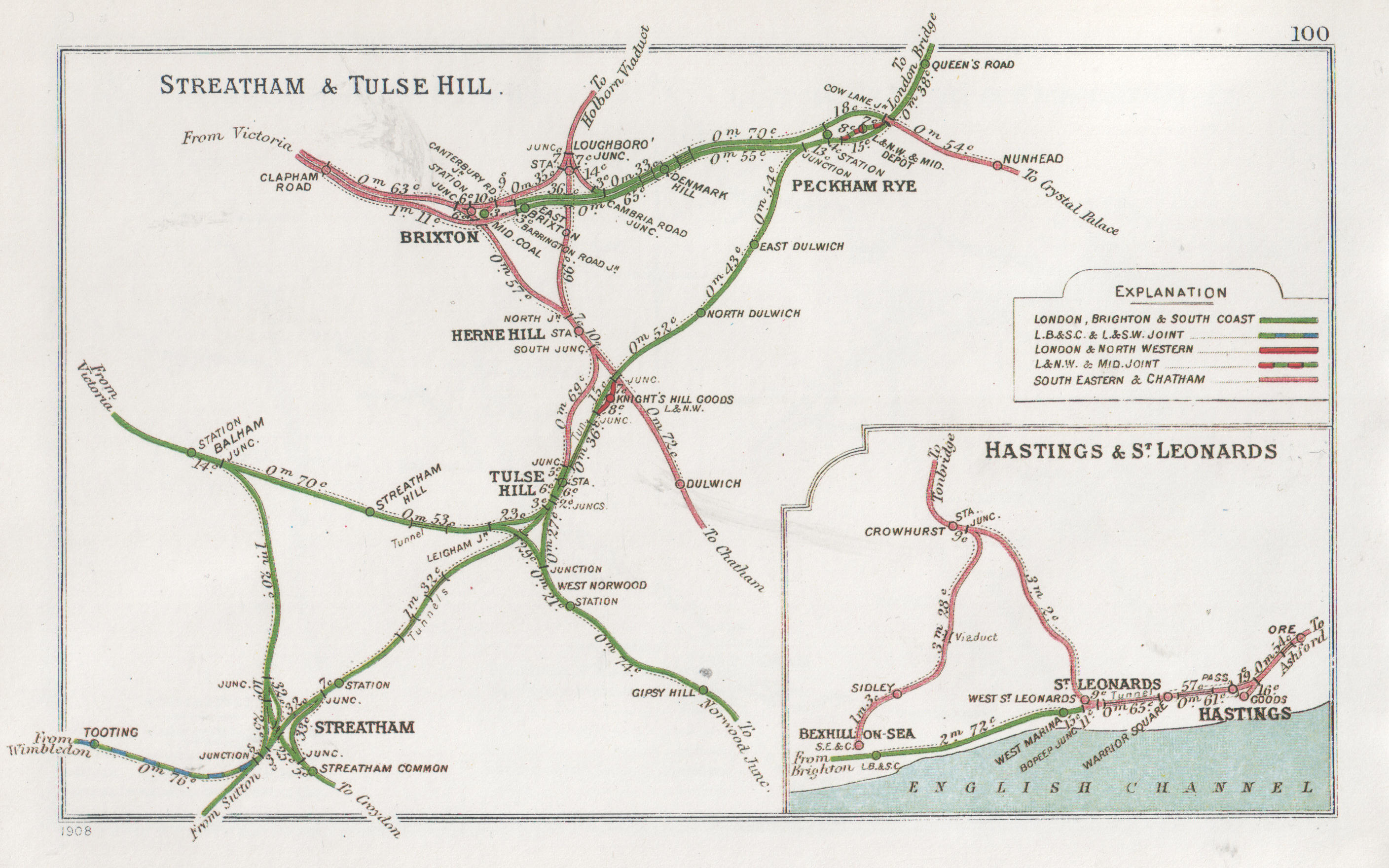
A 1908 Railway Clearing House map of lines around Denmark Hill

The station was built between 1864 and 1866. Its design by Charles Henry Driver is in the Italianate style, with an extremely decorative frontage and French pavilion roofs.

In 1920 the waiting room was used by The Mystical Church of the Comforter, founded by Elizabeth Mary Eagle Skinner, who was known as "The Messenger". The waiting room was transformed by an altar, painted white and surrounded by the seven colours of the rainbow. The Nottingham Evening Post for 17 June 1926 reported that babies were baptised, funeral services were read and even a marriage was solemnised. The porters and clerks of the railway company often worked to the accompaniment of hymns sung by the congregation. The church is believed to have ceased to function after the death of Skinner in November 1929.

By the late 1970s, the structure had fallen into disrepair. Arsonists burst into the booking hall in March 1980, and the ensuing fire damaged the roof. Initial work by British Rail engineers to make the building safe by demolishing parts of the remaining building triggered a protest campaign by the Camberwell Society. Following a joint initiative between them, the Southwark Environment Trust and the British Rail Director of the Environment, Bernard Kaukas, the building was restored in 1985.

The project included the addition of a public house, initially called the Phoenix and Firkin to commemorate the fire, then called O'Neills and now the Phoenix. The building was given a Civic Trust award in 2009.

In the period 2011–2013 the station underwent a redesign with the construction of a new ticket office with access from Champion Park, new walkways and lifts to the platforms.

In September 2021, a second entrance opened on the north-eastern side of the station.

== Design ==
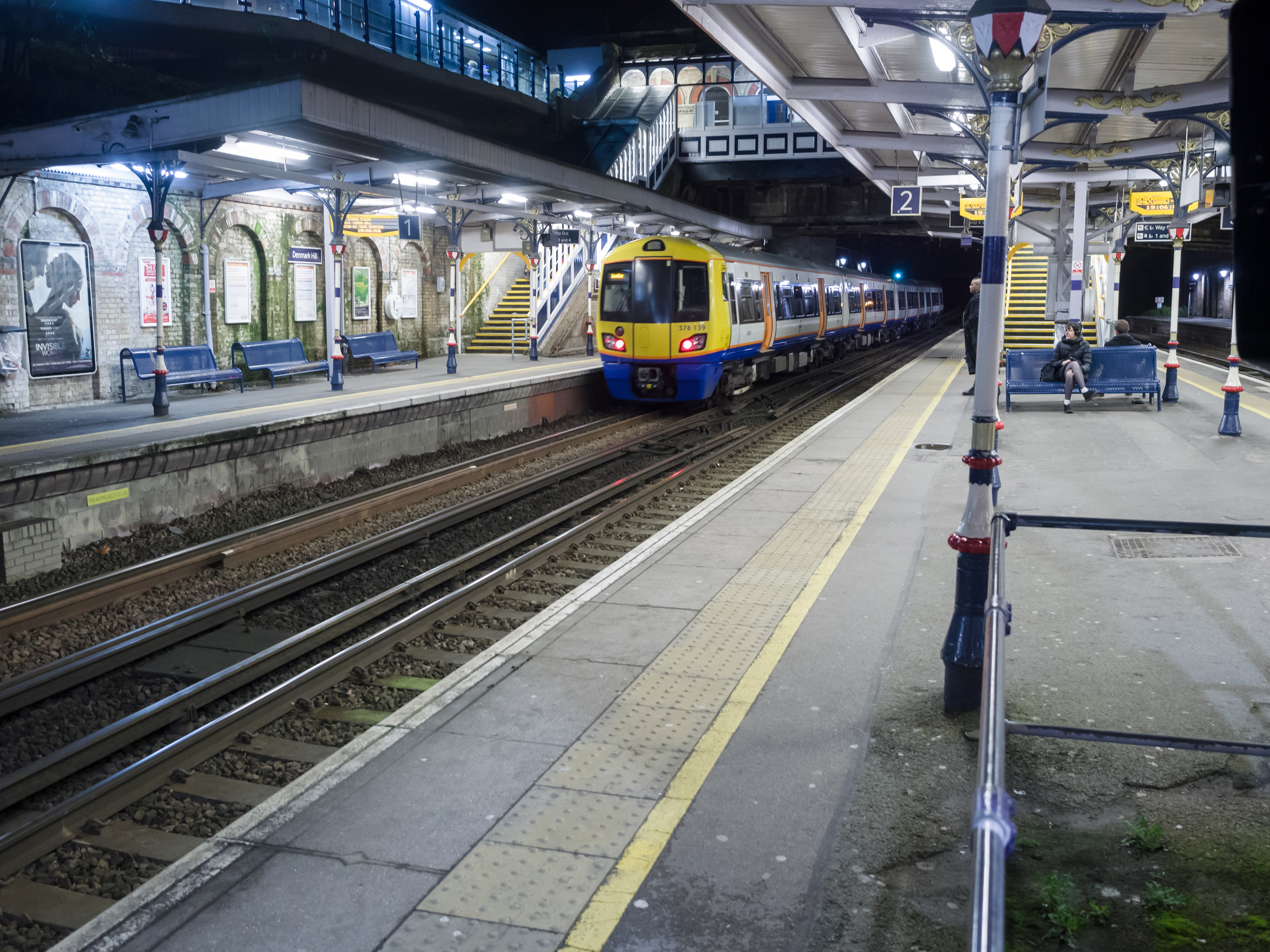
Denmark Hill Platform 1 & 2

The platforms are below road level, with the short Grove Tunnel at one end and Denmark Hill road bridge at the other.

The station features its own vineyard, which is managed by the Camberwell Society who received permission from Network Rail.

== Services ==
Services at Denmark Hill are operated by London Overground (on the Windrush line), Southeastern and Thameslink using Class 375, 377, 378, 465, 466 and 700 EMUs.

The typical off-peak service in trains per hour is:

- 3 tph to London Victoria
- 2 tph to London Blackfriars
- 2 tph to Sevenoaks via Catford
- 2 tph to Dartford via Bexleyheath
- 1 tph to Gillingham via Chatham
- 4 tph to Clapham Junction (Windrush line)
- 4 tph to Dalston Junction via Surrey Quays (Windrush line)

During the peak hours, additional services between Orpington, Kentish Town and Luton call at the station. In addition, the service to London Blackfriars is extended to and from Welwyn Garden City via Finsbury Park and the services between London Victoria and Gillingham are increased to 2 tph.

The station is also served by a limited London Overground service of one train per day to and two trains per day from Battersea Park.

On Sundays, the services to Gillingham are extended to run to and from Dover Priory.

Preceding station	National Rail	Following station
Elephant & Castle	Thameslink Catford Loop Line	Peckham Rye
London Victoria	Southeastern Greenwich Park Branch Line	Peckham Rye
Elephant & Castle Peak Hours Only	Southeastern Greenwich Park Branch Line	Peckham Rye
London Victoria	Southeastern Chatham Main Line	Bromley South
London Victoria	Southeastern Chatham Main Line	Crofton Park Peak Hours Only
Preceding station	London Overground	Following station
Clapham High Street towards Clapham Junction or Battersea Park	Windrush line South London line	Peckham Rye towards Dalston Junction
Disused railways
East Brixton	British Rail; Southern Region South London Line	Peckham Rye

== Layout ==
The station is on two lines. The South London line passes through the southern pair of tracks (through platforms 1 and 2) running to London Victoria and Clapham Junction, used by Windrush line services; while the Catford loop line passes through the northern pair of tracks (through platforms 3 and 4) running to London Blackfriars and beyond to the Thameslink core and Victoria.

- Platform 1: Windrush line (London Overground) services to Clapham Junction; Southeastern services to London Victoria.
- Platform 2: Windrush line (London Overground) services to Dalston Junction or Highbury & Islington; Southeastern services to Dover Priory or Gillingham.
- Platform 3: Thameslink services to Kentish Town, London Blackfriars, Luton and Welwyn Garden City.
- Platform 4: Thameslink services to Orpington or Sevenoaks; Southeastern services to Ashford International or Dartford.

== Connections ==
London Buses routes 40, 176, 185 and 484 serve the station.

== See also ==
- Camberwell a disused station is located nearby
