= Clapham High Street railway station =

London Overground station

Clapham High Street
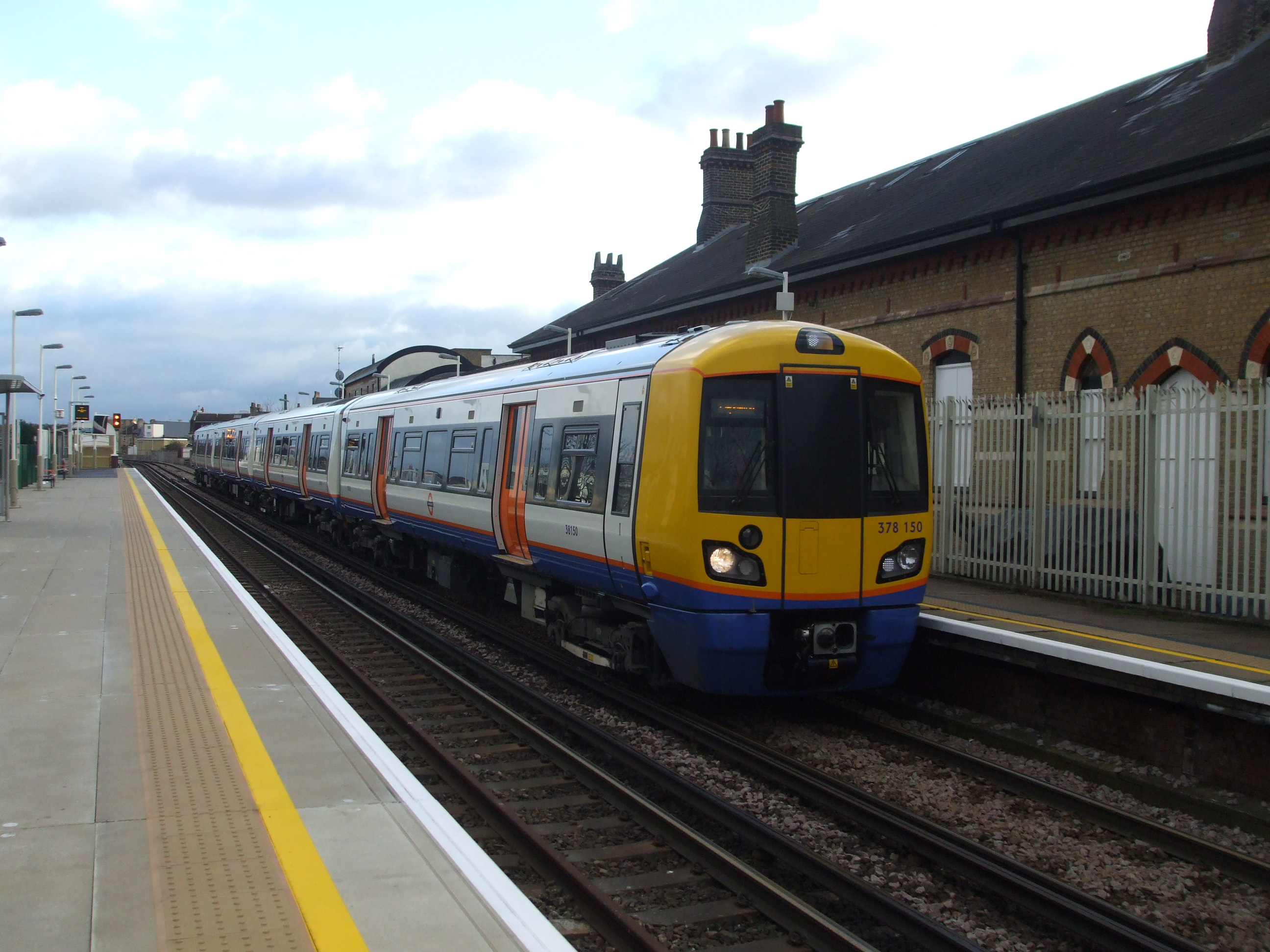
- Interactive map of Clapham High Street

General information
- Location: Clapham
- Local authority: London Borough of Lambeth
- Managed by: London Overground
- Station code: CLP
- DfT category: F1
- Number of platforms: 2
- Fare zone: 2
- OSI: Clapham North

National Rail annual entry and exit
- 2020–21: ▼0.561 million
- 2021–22: ▲1.289 million
- 2022–23: ▲1.387 million
- 2023–24: ▼1.378 million
- 2024–25: ▲1.383 million

Railway companies
- Original company: London, Chatham and Dover Railway
- Post-grouping: Southern Railway

Key dates
- 25 August 1862: Opened (LCDR)
- 1 May 1867: Opened (LBSCR)
- 3 April 1916: Closed (LCDR)

Other information
- External links: Departures; Facilities
- Coordinates: 51.4658°N 0.1328°W

Clapham High Street is a station on the Windrush line of the London Overground, located in Clapham in the London Borough of Lambeth. It is 6 miles 21 chains (10.1 km) measured from London Bridge, the former LC&DR platforms also being 2 miles 25 chains (3.7 km) measured from London Victoria.

There is an out-of-station interchange with Clapham North tube station on the Northern line of the London Underground, located 200 metres (660 ft) walk away from Clapham High Street station.Southeastern services from Lewisham pass through the station, however proposals to call at the station have been limited by the age of Southeastern’s rolling stock.

== History ==
The station was opened on 25 August 1862 by the London, Chatham and Dover Railway (LCDR) as Clapham, renamed Clapham & North Stockwell from May 1863. It was also known as Clapham Road, Clapham Road & North Stockwell, or Clapham Town. The London, Brighton and South Coast Railway (LBSCR) route (current Atlantic Line, often referred to by its old name of South London Line) was authorised by an 1863 Act of Parliament and parallels the original 1862 LCDR route eastwards between Wandsworth Road and Brixton and beyond. Until the 1923 grouping all lines through the station were owned by the LCDR, with two leased to the LBSCR for their sole use.

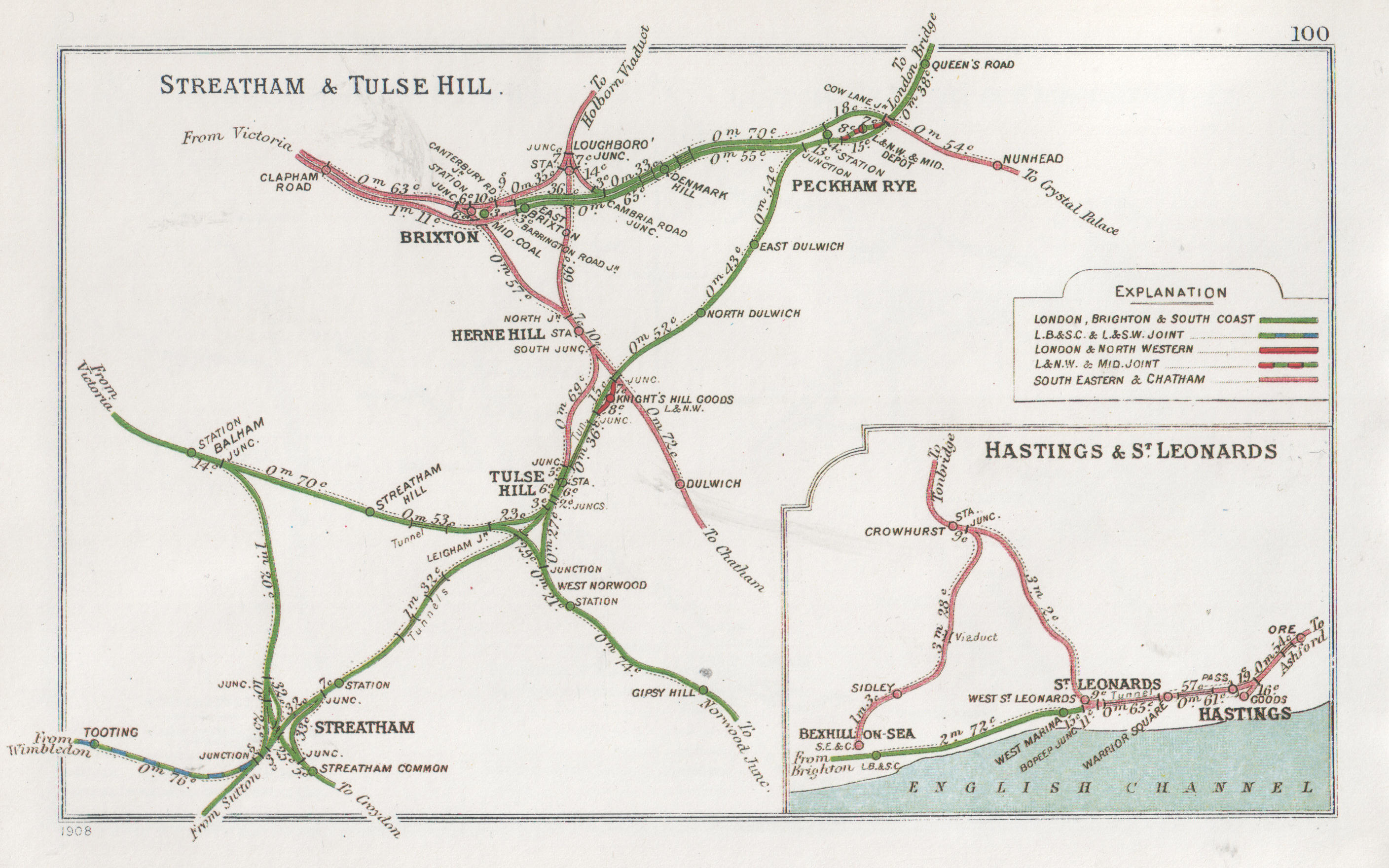
A 1908 Railway Clearing House map of lines around Clapham High Street, here labelled Clapham Road

The original 'south' 1862 line was leased to the LBSCR in 1867 and the LCDR used the new 'north' 1867 lines.

The existing platforms, together with the Grade II listed 1862 station building, form the original station. These platforms were used by the LCDR from 1862 to 1867, and the LBSCR until the 1923 grouping.

The 1867 LCDR platforms were closed on 3 April 1916 and subsequently demolished. The eastbound platform's station building was destroyed by a bomb in 1944.

The LCDR 1866 station building (on the north side) was partially demolished in 1924 after the 1916 closure, finally being demolished in the late 1970s. In British Rail days, access to the platforms was via a subway on the north side.

The original south 1862 building was sold, being initially used as a furniture warehouse before being redeveloped in 2003 as residential accommodation. It is now Grade II listed. The platform had a full-length canopy that was demolished in the late 1970s.

The line between London Victoria and London Bridge was electrified at 6600 V AC on the overhead system on 1 December 1909. It was re-electrified in 1928 using third rail 660 V DC and the overhead was dismantled.

In 1937 it was renamed Clapham before receiving its current name in 1989 to avoid confusion with Clapham Junction.

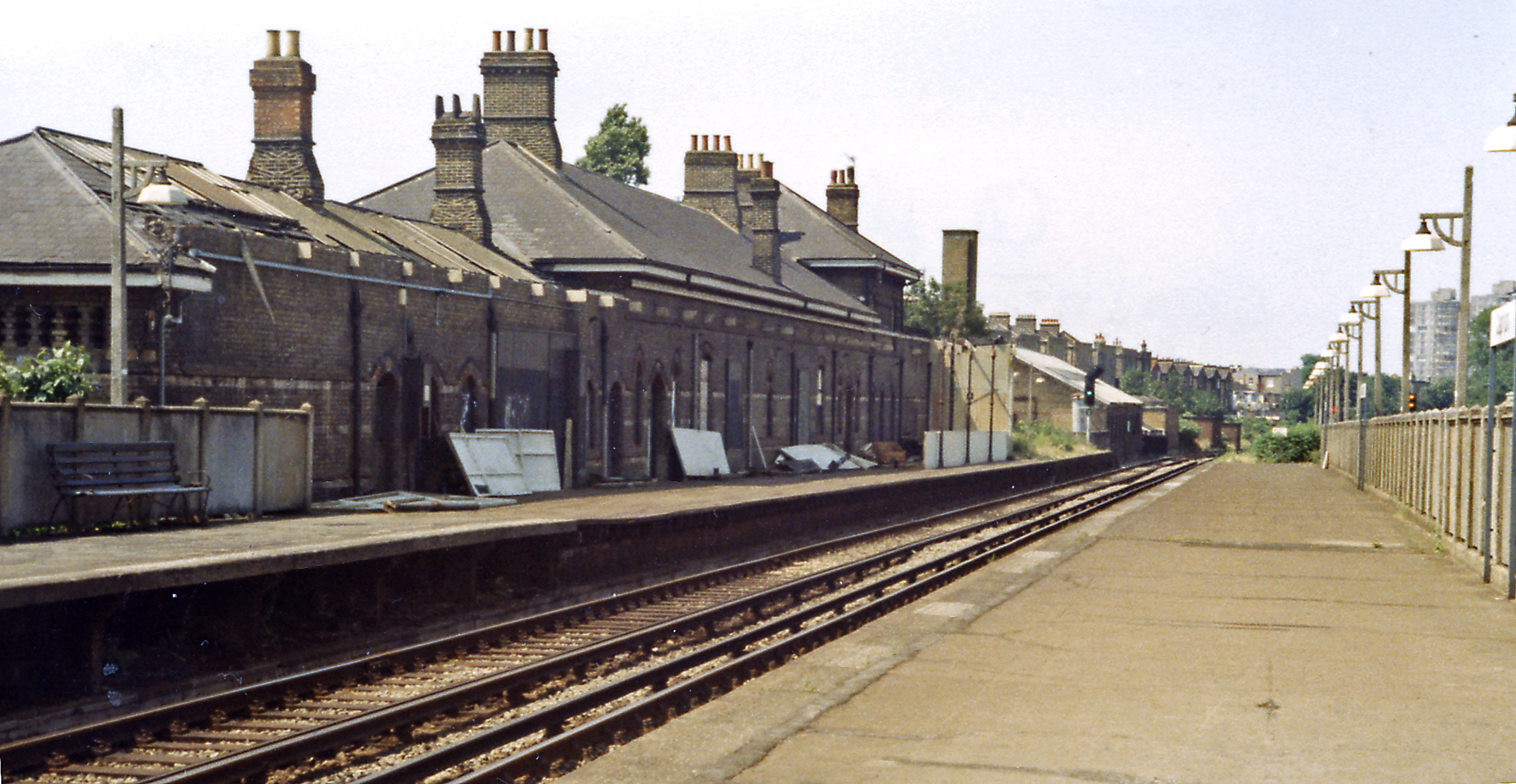
The station in 1984 with fencing being erected between the platform and former station building

In 1989 it was given a 'worst station' award by The Daily Telegraph. Judges wrote in their report that the corridors and stairs were "filthy with broken lights, filthy paintwork which is covered in graffiti and litter including aerosols, broken glass, bricks and rags everywhere which you have to step over".

In 2012 Southern refurbished the eastbound platform, erecting a new fence and repaving the surface. In late 2012, London Overground erected new waiting shelters and station name signs.

== Services ==
The typical off-peak and peak service on the Windrush line of the London Overground is four trains per hour to Clapham Junction and four trains per hour to Dalston Junction via Shoreditch High Street, joining the East London line at Surrey Quays.

Preceding station	London Overground	Following station
Wandsworth Road towards Clapham Junction or Battersea Park	Windrush line South London line	Denmark Hill towards Dalston Junction
Historical railways
Wandsworth Road; Line and station open	British Rail; Southern Region; South London line	East Brixton; Line open, station closed
Wandsworth Road; Line and station open	London, Chatham & Dover Railway; Main Line	Brixton; Line and station open

Until 8 December 2012, Clapham High Street was served by a twice-hourly Southern service between London Victoria and London Bridge.

From 9 December 2012, London Overground services began operating between Clapham Junction and Surrey Quays, completing the orbital route around London. As a result, all Southern services were withdrawn and replaced with London Overground services, with four trains calling per hour.

== Connections ==
London Buses routes 50, 88, 155, 322, 345 and P5 and night route N155 serve the station.
