= Peckham Rye railway station =

National rail station in London, England

Peckham Rye
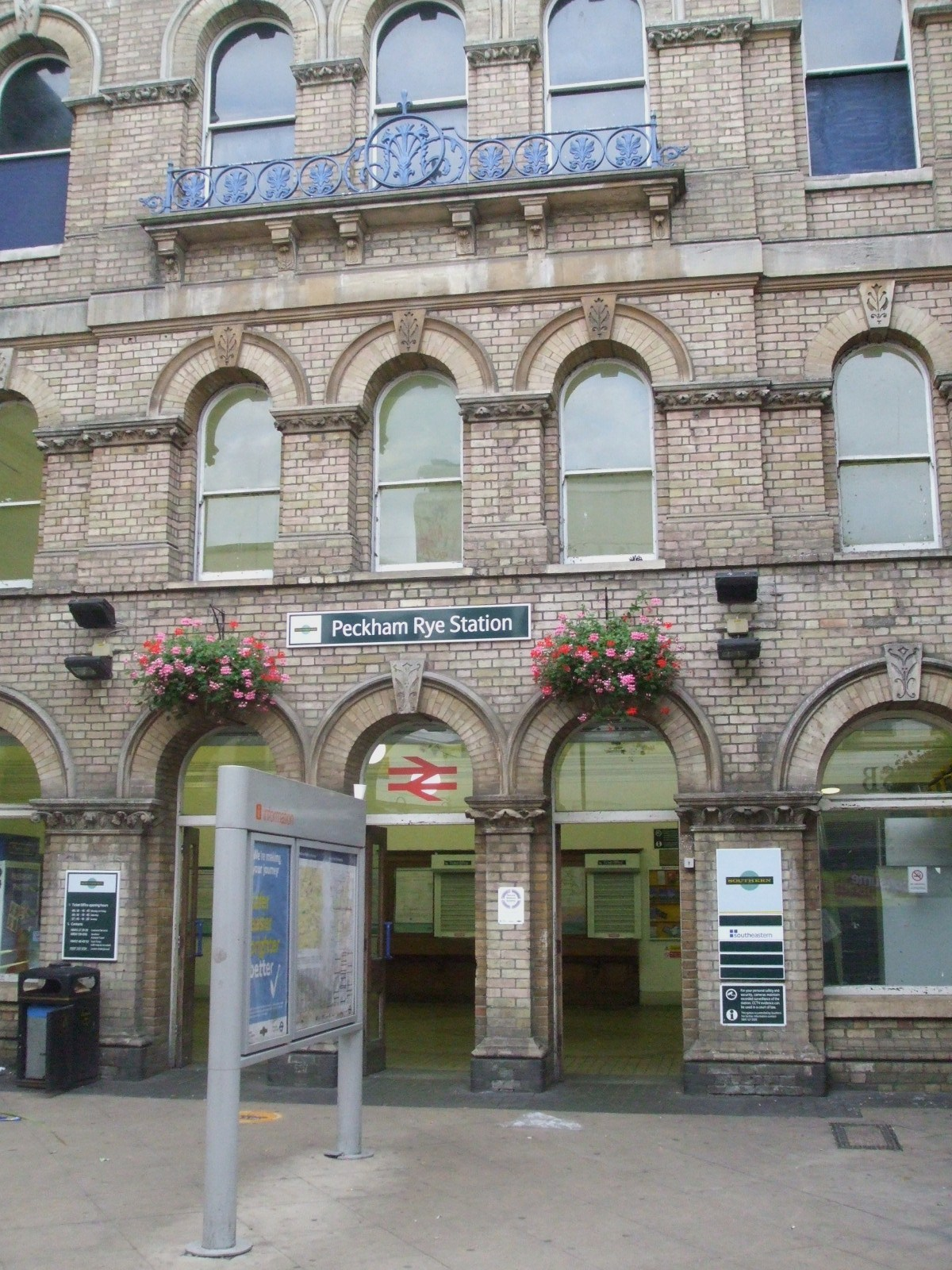
- Peckham Rye Station main entrance
- Interactive map of Peckham Rye

General information
- Location: Peckham
- Local authority: London Borough of Southwark
- Managed by: Southern
- Station code: PMR
- DfT category: D
- Number of platforms: 4
- Fare zone: 2

National Rail annual entry and exit
- 2020–21: ▼2.029 million
- Interchange: ▼0.725 million
- 2021–22: ▲4.440 million
- Interchange: ▲1.491 million
- 2022–23: ▲5.412 million
- Interchange: ▲3.039 million
- 2023–24: ▲5.935 million
- Interchange: ▼1.668 million
- 2024–25: ▲6.137 million
- Interchange: ▼1.140 million

Railway companies
- Original company: London, Brighton and South Coast Railway

Key dates
- 1 December 1865: Opened (LCDR)
- 13 August 1866: Opened (LBSCR)

Listed status
- Listed feature: Peckham Rye Station
- Listing grade: Grade II listed
- Entry number: 1392389
- Added to list: 31 January 2008

Other information
- External links: Departures; Facilities
- Coordinates: 51.46989°N 0.06886°W

Peckham Rye is an interchange station between the Windrush line of the London Overground and National Rail services operated by Southeastern, Southern and Thameslink, located in Peckham town centre in South London.

== History ==
It opened on 1 December 1865 for London, Chatham and Dover Railway (LCDR) trains and on 13 August 1866 for London, Brighton and South Coast Railway (LBSCR) trains. It was designed by Charles Henry Driver (1832–1900), the architect of Abbey Mills and Crossness pumping stations, who also designed the grade II listed Denmark Hill and Battersea Park stations between Peckham and London Victoria.

== Layout and routes ==
It is between Denmark Hill and Queens Road Peckham on the Windrush line, between Denmark Hill and Nunhead on the Catford loop line, and between Queens Road Peckham and East Dulwich on the Portsmouth Line. It is in London fare zone 2 and is 3 miles 36 chains (5.6 km) measured from London Bridge or 5 miles 13 chains (8.3 km) measured from London Victoria.

Peckham Rye is a major interchange served by four different routes. Its platforms are on two separate viaducts with a single ticket hall at ground level. Platforms 1 and 2 are on the south viaduct and served by Southern services (London Bridge via Tulse Hill to Beckenham Junction and East Croydon), and Windrush line (London Overground) services (Clapham Junction to Dalston Junction). Platforms 3 and 4 are on the north viaduct and served by Thameslink (Blackfriars to Sevenoaks) and Southeastern (Victoria to Dartford).

The station is Grade II listed.

== Station improvements ==
=== Refurbishment ===
Ticket gates were installed in May 2009 and during late 2010 the station was refurbished as part of a 'deep clean' by Southern. A former waiting room for platforms 2 and 3, bricked up for 55 years, was partially restored and temporarily re-opened with a permanent re-opening being planned.

== Future improvements ==
Peckham Rye station was targeted for step-free access, originally planned for completion in 2024.

However, as of mid-2025, that project is on hold following a Spending Review that reprioritised Department for Transport funding toward schemes with more immediate passenger impact.

Separately, Southwark Council, in collaboration with the Greater London Authority and Network Rail, has commenced a redevelopment of the station’s forecourt, known as the "Peckham Rye Station Square." This project involves demolishing the 1930s-style arcade to reveal a restored Victorian Grade II-listed station façade and creating a new public square and commercial units. Demolition started in March 2026 and construction expected to complete by autumn 2027. During the demolition, the Rye Lane entrance is closed.

== Services ==
Services at Peckham Rye are operated by London Overground (on the Windrush line), Southeastern, Southern and Thameslink using Class 377, 378, 465, 466 and 700 EMUs.

The typical off-peak service in trains per hour is:

- 2 tph to London Victoria
- 2 tph to London Blackfriars
- 4 tph to London Bridge
- 2 tph to Beckenham Junction via Crystal Palace
- 2 tph to East Croydon via Norbury
- 2 tph to Sevenoaks via Catford
- 2 tph to Dartford via Bexleyheath
- 4 tph to Clapham Junction (Windrush line)
- 4 tph to Dalston Junction via Surrey Quays (Windrush line)

During the peak hours, additional services between Orpington, Kentish Town and Luton call at the station. In addition, the service to London Blackfriars is extended to and from Welwyn Garden City via Finsbury Park.

The station is also served by a limited London Overground service of one train per day to and two trains per day from Battersea Park.

On Sundays, the services between London Bridge and Beckenham Junction do not run.

Preceding station	National Rail	Following station
Denmark Hill	Thameslink Catford Loop Line	Nunhead
Denmark Hill	Southeastern Greenwich Park Branch Line	Nunhead
Queens Road Peckham	Southern South London Line	East Dulwich
Preceding station	London Overground	Following station
Denmark Hill towards Clapham Junction or Battersea Park	Windrush line South London line	Queens Road Peckham towards Dalston Junction

== Connections ==
London Buses routes 12, 37, 63, 78, 197, 343, 363, P12 and P13 and night routes N63 and N343 serve the station; some via the bus station.

== In popular culture ==
In the first episode of The Sweeney, "Ringer", the station's platforms, steps, and entrance were filmed for Regan and Carter's chase on foot of Billy who had stolen Regan's girlfriend's car.

It is shown in the introduction of the Channel 4 show Desmond's.
