= Wandsworth Road railway station =

London Overground station

Wandsworth Road
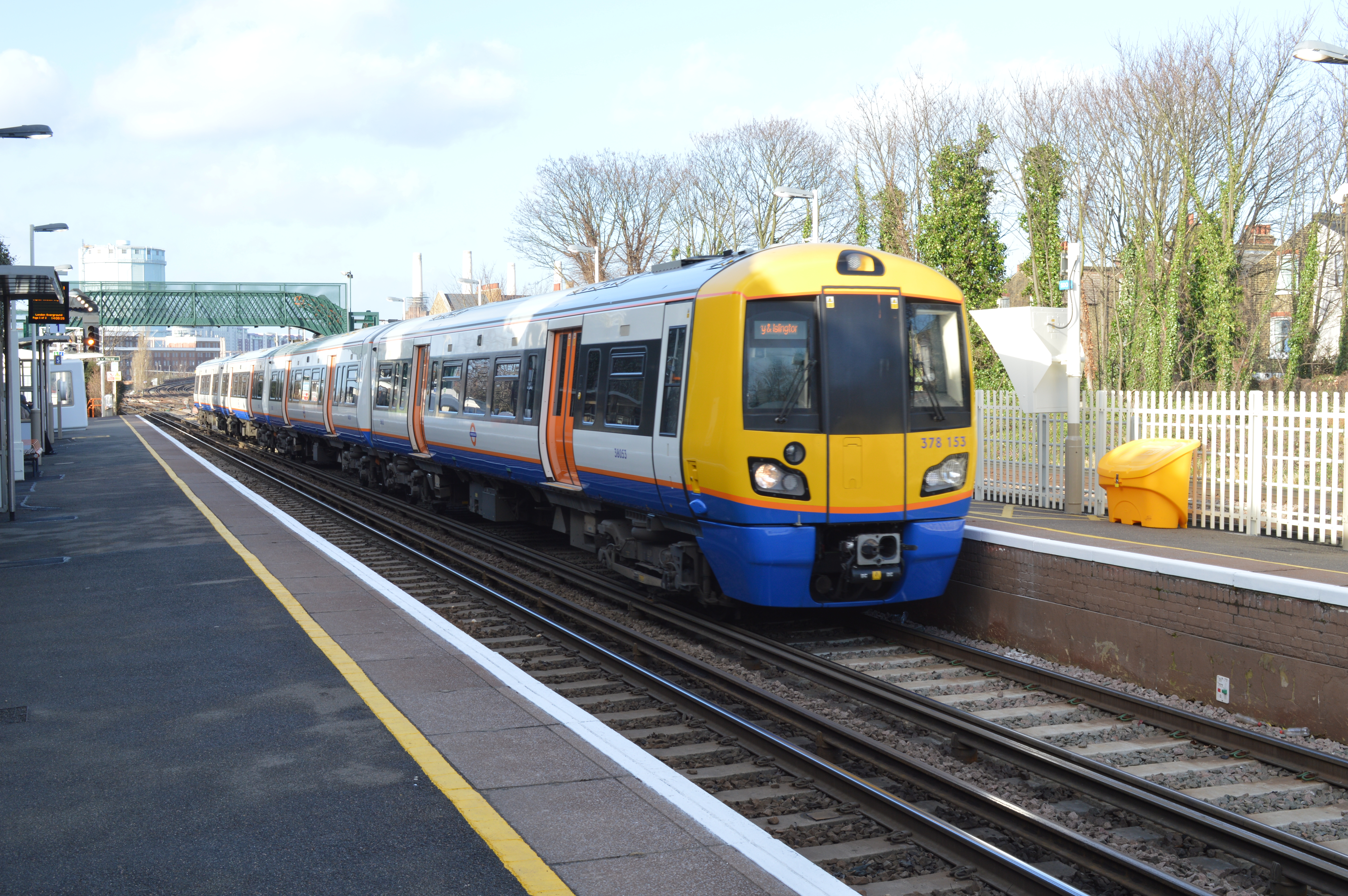
- Interactive map of Wandsworth Road

General information
- Location: Clapham
- Local authority: London Borough of Lambeth
- Managed by: London Overground
- Station code: WWR
- DfT category: F1
- Number of platforms: 2
- Fare zone: 2

National Rail annual entry and exit
- 2020–21: ▼0.264 million
- 2021–22: ▲0.510 million
- 2022–23: ▲0.570 million
- 2023–24: ▲0.586 million
- 2024–25: ▲0.610 million

Railway companies
- Original company: London, Chatham and Dover Railway

Key dates
- 1 March 1863: Opened (LCDR)
- 1 May 1867: Opened (LBSCR)
- 3 April 1916: Closed (LCDR)

Other information
- External links: Departures; Facilities
- Coordinates: 51.47°N 0.1384°W

Wandsworth Road is a station on the Windrush line of the London Overground, located between the two south-west London areas of Battersea and Clapham. It is 1 mile 75 chains (3.1 km) from London Victoria.

== History ==
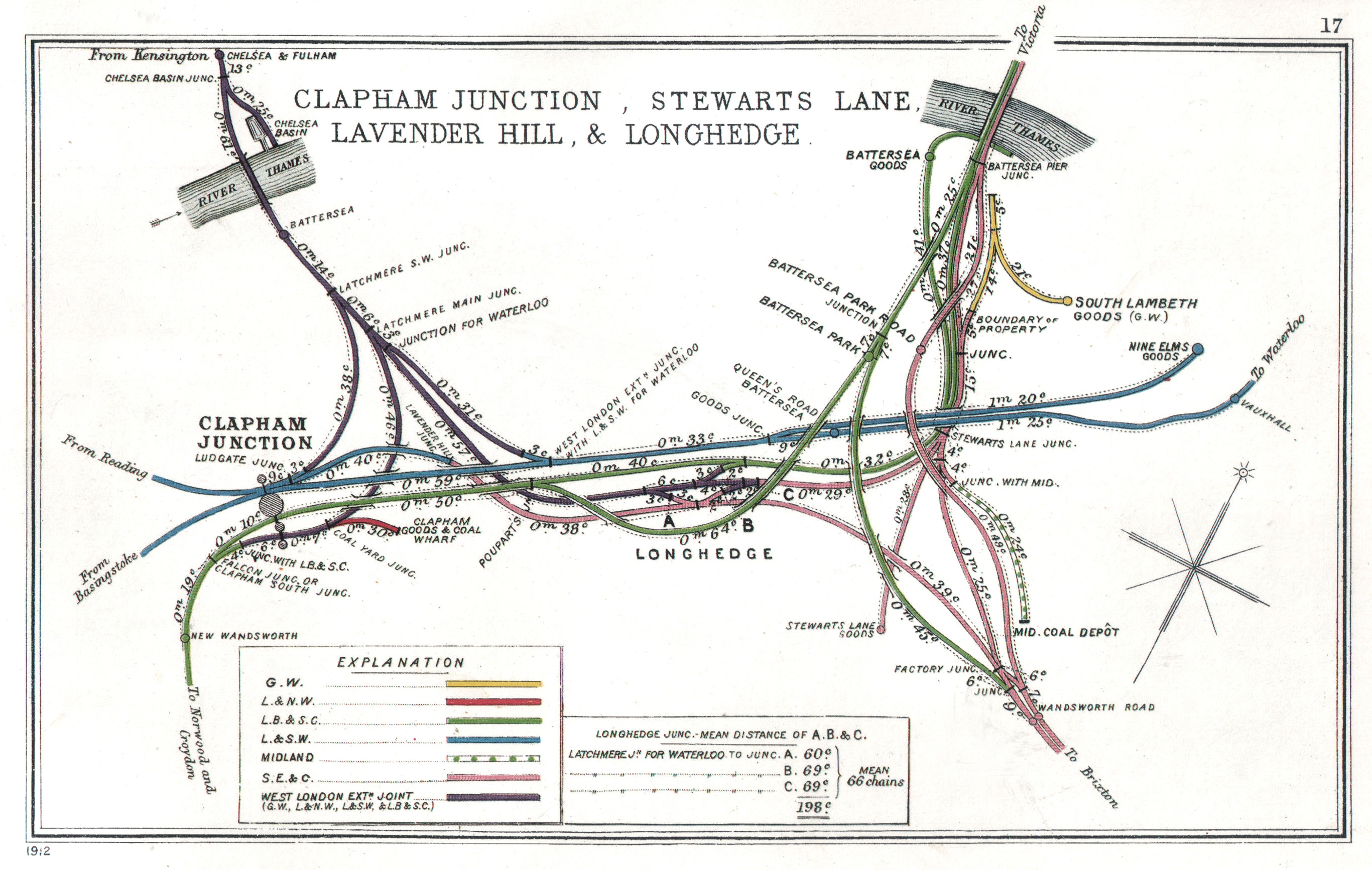
A 1912 Railway Clearing House map of lines around Wandsworth Road

=== Chatham lines ===
The station opened on 1 March 1863, on the London, Chatham and Dover Railway (LCDR) original double-track low-level route from Victoria via Stewarts Lane, which was opened between Victoria and Herne Hill, on 25 August 1862. The LCDR constructed a triple-track high-level route between Battersea Pier Junction and Brixton, part of which opened between Factory Junction, (100 metres north of Wandsworth Road station) and Brixton on 1 May 1866, together with three additional platforms at Wandsworth Road. Therefore, from May 1866 until April 1916, this station had five platforms. In 1879 the LCDR was running the following services that stopped at Wandsworth Road:

- Frequent trains between Moorgate and Victoria, calling at all stations (Note: Trains called at Moorgate Street, Aldersgate Street, Snow Hill, Ludgate Hill, Blackfriars, Borough Road, Elephant and Castle, Walworth Road, Camberwell, Loughborough Junction, Brixton and South Stockwell, Clapham and North Stockwell, Wandsworth Road, Battersea Park Road, Grosvenor Road and Victoria)
- Half-hourly trains between Moorgate and Clapham Junction, calling at all stations (Note: Trains ran as for the Moorgate to Victoria service, calling only at Clapham Junction after Wandsworth Road.)
- Through trains from Kentish Town to Victoria, calling at all stations (Note: Trains called at Kentish Town, King's Cross (York Road), King's Cross (Metropolitan), Farringdon Street, Snow Hill then as for the Moorgate to Victoria service.)

The LCDR was operated as part of the joint South Eastern and Chatham Railway (SECR) from 1899.

SECR withdrew it services on 3 April 1916 and the three 1866 platforms were closed.

The former South Eastern & Chatham platforms which closed in 1916 were demolished in the late 1920s.

=== Atlantic lines ===
On 1 May 1867, the London, Chatham and Dover Railway leased the original two tracks to the London, Brighton and South Coast Railway (LBSCR) for use by its new South London line service, which ran between Victoria and London Bridge via Denmark Hill. After the SECR withdrew its service on 3 April 1916 only the original two 1863 platforms remained in operation and were served by the LBSCR. The South London line service was withdrawn for four months during the 1926 general strike with the station closed from 19 May 1926 to 20 September 1926.

A footbridge was installed by Network SouthEast in November 1988 having previously been used at Mitcham.

The London Victoria and London Bridge service continued until 8 December 2012, ultimately with a train twice-hourly and operated by Southern. This was mostly replaced by the London Overground service between Clapham Junction and Dalston Junction.

=== Parliamentary trains ===
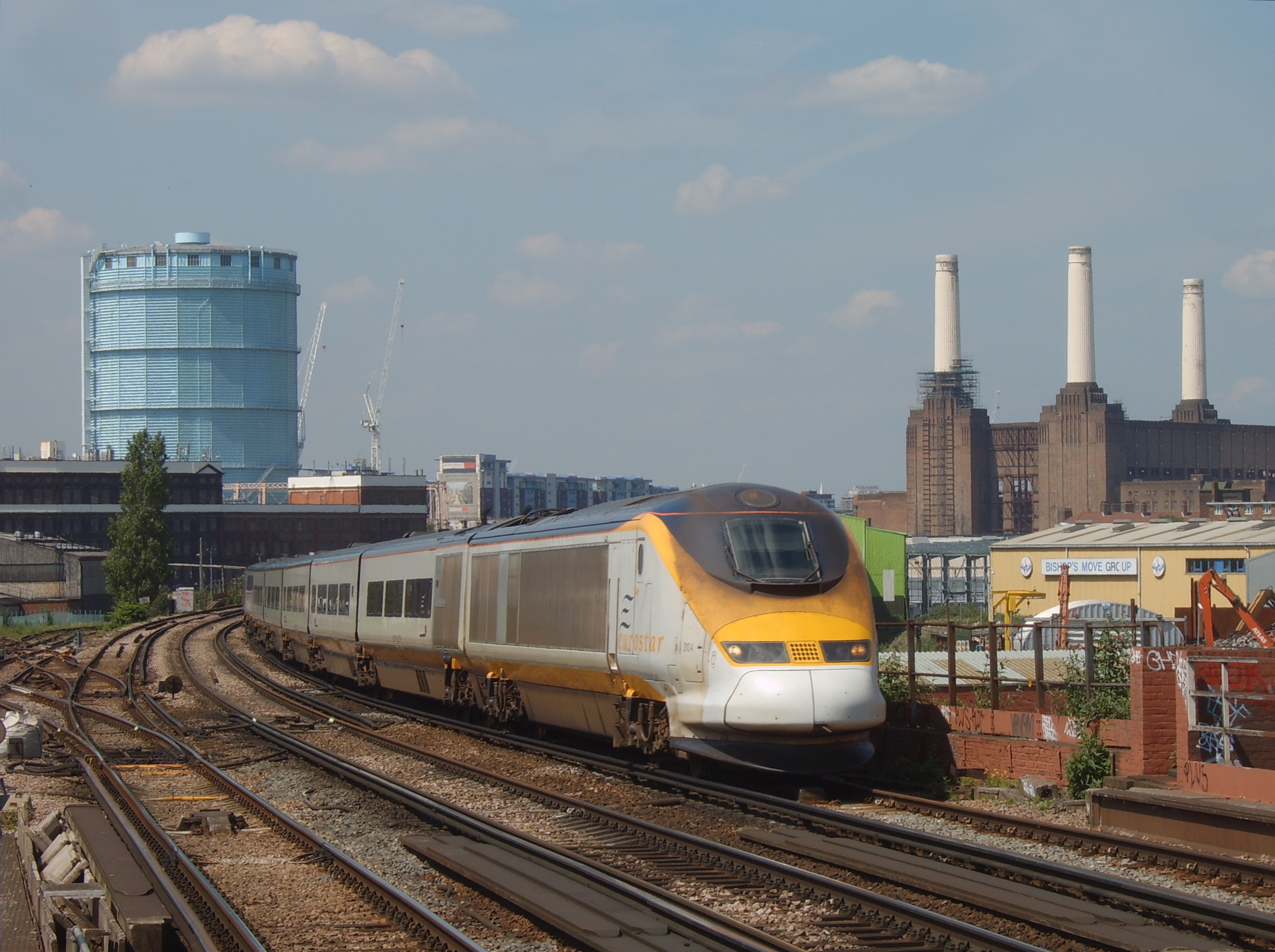
Before November 2007, when Eurostar trains were transferred from Waterloo to St Pancras, they passed by Wandsworth Road

Following the withdrawal of CrossCountry's services from Reading to Brighton via Kensington Olympia in December 2008 the Department for Transport required a weekly parliamentary train to run on lines no longer used by other services, hence Southern operated a morning weekday service from Kensington Olympia to Clapham High Street with a corresponding service in the afternoon. This was withdrawn in December 2012. Since then the service was instead been cut back to Wandsworth Road from Kensington Olympia, and then withdrawn completely in June 2013, following the ratification of the service withdrawal request by the Department for Transport and Office of Rail and Road.

== Services ==
London Overground operate four services per hour in each direction on the Windrush line between Clapham Junction and Dalston Junction. There is also a limited early morning and late evening service from and to Battersea Park.

Preceding station	London Overground	Following station
Clapham Junction Terminus	Windrush line South London line	Clapham High Street towards Dalston Junction
Battersea Park Terminus	Windrush line South London line (Limited service)	Clapham High Street towards Dalston Junction
Historical railways
Battersea Park Road; Line open, station closed	London, Chatham & Dover Railway; Main Line	Clapham High Street; Line and station open

== Connections ==
London Buses routes 77, 87 and 452 and night route N87 serve the station.
