= North London Line City Branch =

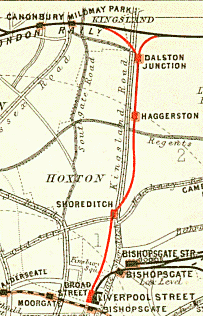
The City Branch in 1899

The City Branch was a short spur of the North London Line allowing direct access from the east-west main route of the North London Railway to the terminus at Broad Street in the City of London.

== History ==
The North London Railway (NLR) was founded in 1850 with the intention of operating a network of railway lines throughout north London that connected to the East India and West India Docks. The company's main headquarters was at Bow, and from there a connection to the London and Blackwall Railway's route allowed the NLR's trains access to a terminus in the City of London, in this case Fenchurch Street. However, this meant that, in order to reach the City, the NLR's trains had to take a fairly circuitous route, and so the company decided to build its own central terminus.

North London Railway (City Branch) Act 1861
- Act of Parliament
- Parliament of the United Kingdom
- Long title: An Act to empower the North London Railway Company to construct a Railway from Liverpool Street in the City of London to join their existing Railway at Kingsland; and for other Purposes.
- Citation: 24 & 25 Vict. c. cxcvi

Dates
- Royal assent: 22 July 1861

The North London Railway (City Branch) Act 1861 (24 & 25 Vict. c. cxcvi) was passed giving permission to the NLR to build an extension from its main line through Hackney to a site at Old Broad Street. The majority of the route was built on a viaduct from Dalston, with a triangular junction allowing access to the main line in both directions. The extension had four new stations:

- Dalston Junction - the closest station to the main line, with the junction heading both east and west just north of it,
- Haggerston
- Shoreditch
- Broad Street - the NLR's new terminus

Passenger services along the Kingsland Viaduct to Broad Street began in November 1865. Initially, the branch had three running lines; a fourth line was added in 1874. The route was electrified in 1916 using the 600 V DC third and fourth rail system, with the purchase of new electric rolling stock. However, only the western five platforms at Broad Street were electrified.

Both Haggerston and Shoreditch stations, as well as the rest of the branch, received heavy damage in the Second World War, and were closed in 1940, leaving Dalston Junction as the only intermediate station between Broad Street and the main line. At this time, passenger numbers on the branch were declining. The eastern route to Poplar was closed in 1944, while services from the rest of London declined. The route was earmarked for closure under the Beeching Axe in 1963, but remained open due to local pressure. However, the opening of other routes led to further services being withdrawn until it was decided in 1985 that the route would be mothballed. By then Dalston Kingsland had opened to serve the Dalston area, and both Dalston Junction and Broad Street were closed.

== Today ==
Although the route was mothballed following the closure of Broad Street in 1986, the trackbed along the Kingsland Viaduct remained intact. As a consequence, much of the route was restored when Transport for London took possession of it to construct the East London Line extension. This has seen the reopening of Dalston Junction and Haggerston stations, as well as the construction of a new station at Hoxton. This follows the old route until it reaches Shoreditch High Street, where it then connects to a new build route towards Whitechapel.
