= Haggerston railway station =

London Overground station

Haggerston
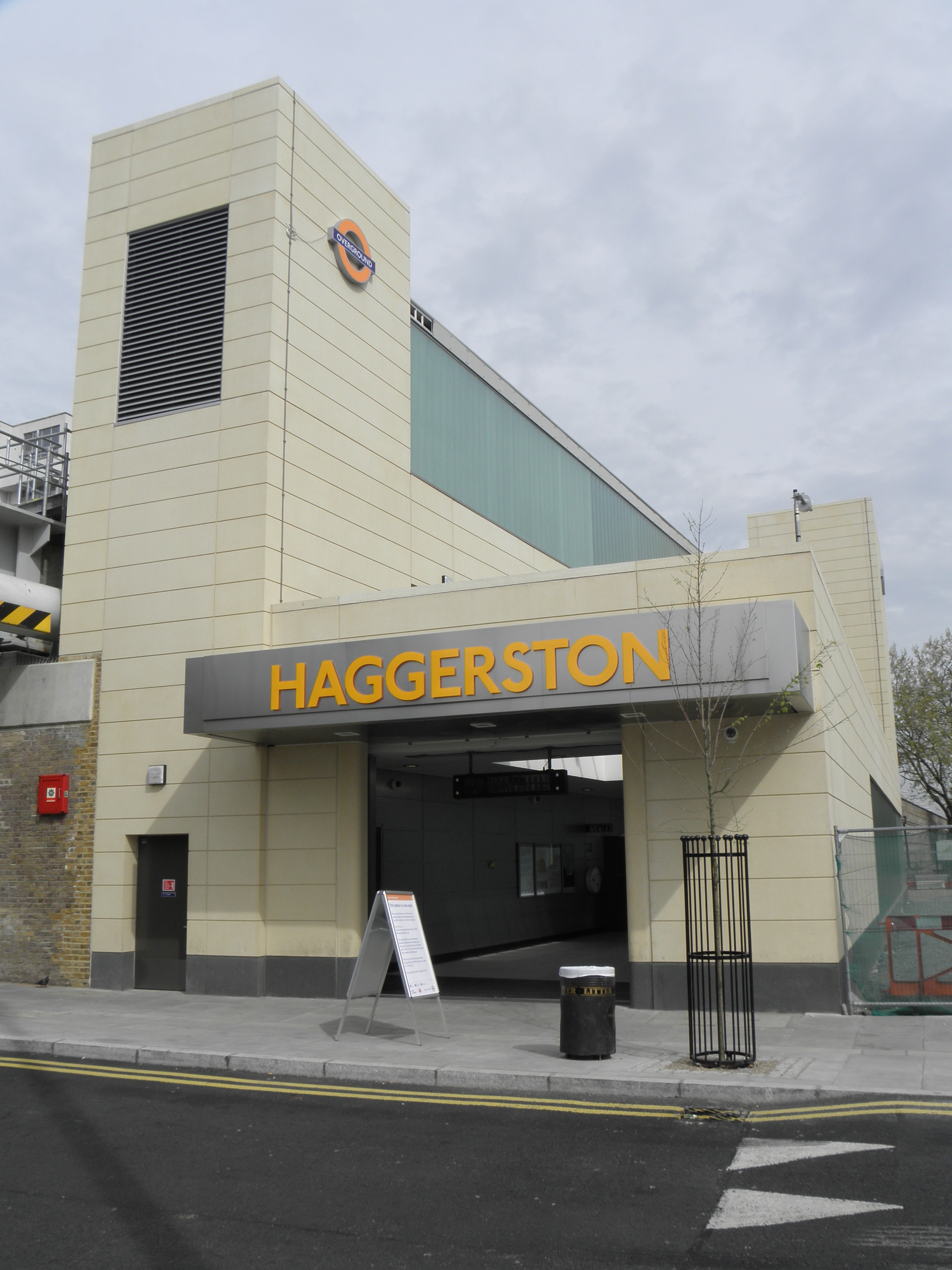
- Station building a day after opening in April 2010
- Interactive map of Haggerston

General information
- Location: Haggerston
- Local authority: London Borough of Hackney
- Managed by: London Overground
- Owner: Transport for London
- Station code: HGG
- Number of platforms: 2
- Accessible: Yes
- Fare zone: 2

National Rail annual entry and exit
- 2020–21: ▼0.896 million
- 2021–22: ▲2.143 million
- 2022–23: ▲3.157 million
- 2023–24: ▲3.680 million
- 2024–25: ▼3.651 million

Railway companies
- Original company: North London Railway
- Pre-grouping: London and North Western Railway
- Post-grouping: LMS

Key dates
- 2 September 1867: Opened
- 6 May 1940: Closed. After closure, station building bomb damaged 7 October 1940.
- 27 April 2010: Rebuilt and Reopened

Other information
- External links: Departures; Facilities
- Coordinates: 51.5386°N 0.0754°W

Haggerston is a station on the Windrush line of the London Overground, located in Haggerston, East London. It lies between Hoxton and Dalston Junction stations, is in London fare zone 2, and is open 24 hours on a Friday and Saturday as part of the London Overground Night Service. The station was rebuilt as part of the East London line extension in the late 2000s.

The station is located on the Kingsland Viaduct at the junction of Arbutus Street and Frederick Terrace, near Kingsland Road. The main entrance is in Lee Street.

== History ==
=== Early history (1867-1923) ===
When the East and West India Docks and Birmingham Junction Railway (known as the North London Railway (NLR) from 1853) started operating on 26 September 1850, they shared a London terminus at Fenchurch Street railway station with the London and Blackwall Railway which involved a circuitous route via Hackney, Bow and East Stepney for city bound passengers. The North London Railway (City Branch) Act 1861 (24 & 25 Vict. c. cxcvi) gave the NLR powers to build a two-mile extension from Dalston to a new London terminus at Broad Street railway station.

The original railway had three tracks and the station had three platform faces. It was situated on a viaduct and was a flat roofed square two storey station building located on Lee Street. Connor suggests the ticket office was at street level and stairs took you up to platform level which were accommodated within the building. The station, which was originally going to be named De-Beauvoir Town was opened on 2 September 1867. It is not known at this juncture whether there were offices or platform level passenger facilities on the top floor of the building. The island platform was accessed by a subway and steps.

A fourth track which did not have a platform face was added in 1872 and used by goods trains to and from Broad Street goods depots.

The signal box was located north of the station between the two sets of running lines.

The London & North Western Railway (LNWR) took over the working of the North London Railway under a common management arrangement on 1 February 1909 although the North London Railway continued to exist until 1922.

In 1916 the two westerly lines were electrified for Broad Street to Richmond services and the two sets of running lines were known as No. 2 Electrics (west side of viaduct) and No 1 Steam (east side of the viaduct). The electric services did not call at Haggerston as there was no fourth platform provided.

==== Services ====
It was initially served by local services from Broad Street to Poplar (East India Road) on the City Extension of the North London Railway. Later Great Northern Railway services to New Barnet, Alexandra Palace, High Barnet and Gordon Hill called during the peak hours. Between 1870 and 1890 some Poplar trains were extended to/from Blackwall.

=== London Midland & Scottish Railway (1923-1940) ===
Following the Railways Act 1921, also known as the grouping act, operation of the station fell under the control of the London Midland & Scottish Railway.

Sunday services to Poplar were withdrawn on 29 January 1940. Following that, services were withdrawn on 6 May 1940 as an economy measure during World War II and the following October the station building was badly damaged by enemy bombs. The signal box was damaged by a further raid in April 1941 and was not replaced.

=== After closure (1940-2010) ===
The Poplar service continued to pass through Haggerston but this was withdrawn on 15 May 1944 due to bomb damage between Dalston and Poplar and declining passenger numbers.

The station building was demolished in December 1946.

The "Steam" lines (also known as No 1 lines) were lifted sometime during the 1970s and traffic declined at Broad Street until that station was closed on 30 June 1986 with the former No 2 electric lines being lifted soon after. After that the trackbed through the station remained overgrown and unused.

=== The new station (2010-present day) ===
The East London line extension saw proposals to extend the East London line (then New Cross/New Cross Gate - Shoreditch) to Dalston and a connection with the North London line. This scheme involved using the old Broad Street lines and a new station was proposed at Haggerston north of the original site.

The new station was designed by Acanthus LW Architects. The design features towers that serve to strengthen the station's urban presence and recall the language of London's stations of the 1930s designed by Charles Holden. The building is clad externally in precast concrete with screens of cast glass planks. Internally, the building features orange mosaic tiling and a large mural to Edmond Halley, who was born in the area.

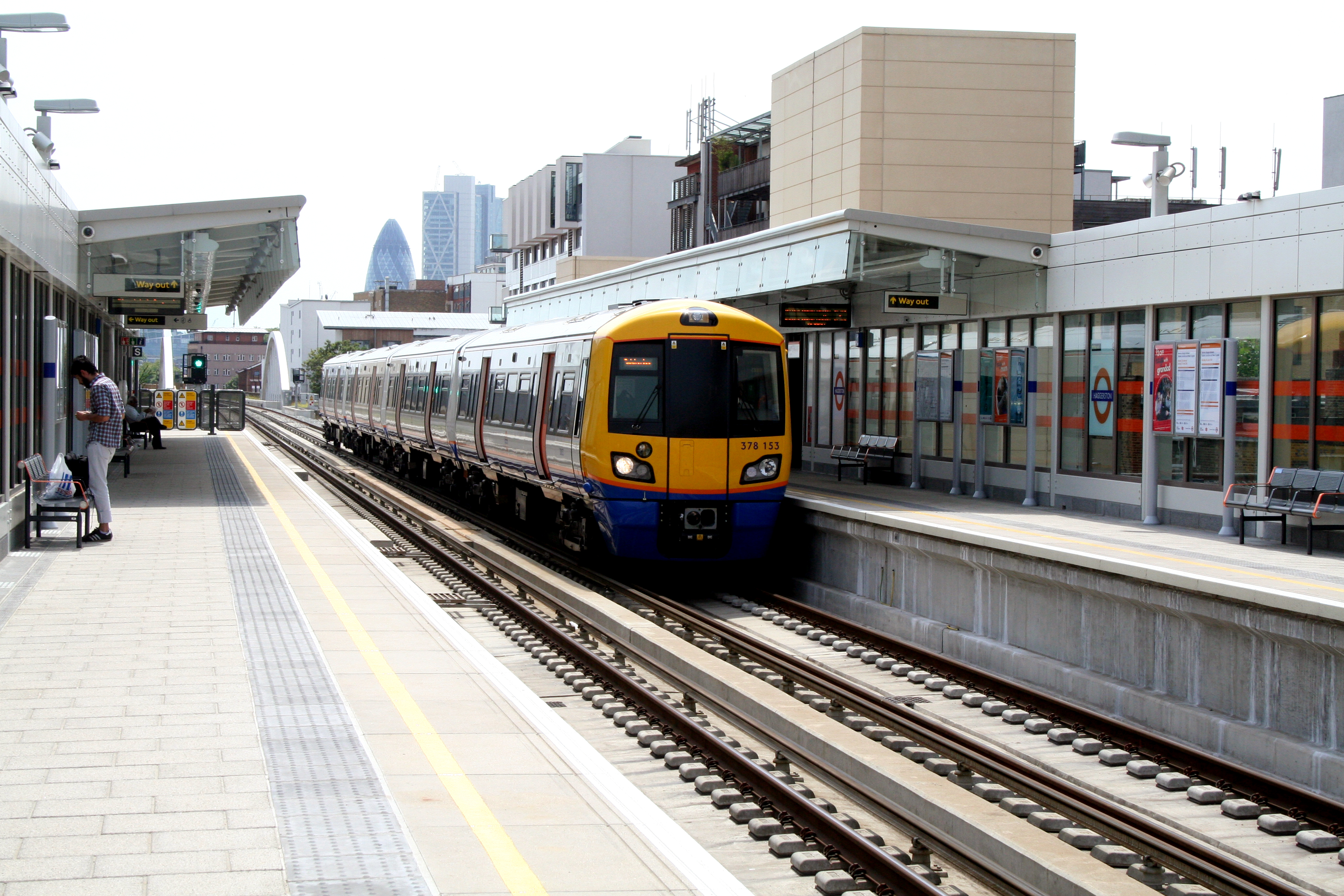
Station platforms

The station was opened to the general public on 27 April 2010 with a limited service running between Dalston Junction and New Cross or New Cross Gate. On 23 May 2010 services were extended from New Cross Gate to West Croydon or Crystal Palace, whilst through trains to Clapham Junction began operating at the December 2012 timetable change.

The former up platform remains (as of 2024) but the original island platform was removed during construction.

== Services (2012) ==
Services are provided on the Windrush line of the London Overground. As of December 2012 the off-peak service is:

- 4 trains per hour (tph) to New Cross via Surrey Quays
- 4 tph to Clapham Junction via Surrey Quays
- 4 tph to Crystal Palace via Surrey Quays
- 4 tph to West Croydon via Surrey Quays
- 16 tph to Dalston Junction, of which 8 tph continue to Highbury & Islington

== Connections ==
London Buses routes 149, 242, 243 and night route N242 serve the station.

== Line ==
Preceding station	London Overground	Following station
Dalston Junction towards Dalston Junction or Highbury & Islington	Windrush line East London line and South London line	Hoxton towards Clapham Junction, Battersea Park, Crystal Palace, New Cross or West Croydon
Historical railways
Dalston Junction; Line and station open	London and North Western Railway; North London Railway	Shoreditch; Line open, station closed
