= Shoreditch railway station =

Former railway station in England

Shoreditch
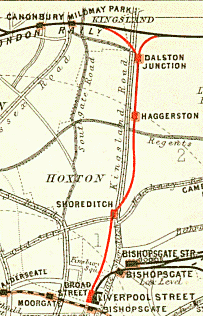
- The Broad Street branch line in 1899
- Interactive map of Shoreditch

General information
- Location: Shoreditch
- Owner: North London Railway
- Number of platforms: 3

Key dates
- 1 November 1865: Opened
- 4 October 1940: passenger train service withdrawn
- 17 November 1941: closed completely

Other information
- Coordinates: 51.5275°N 0.0786°W

Shoreditch was a railway station on the North London Railway (NLR) in Shoreditch, London, that was in use from 1865 to 1940. It was situated on a viaduct between Haggerston and Broad Street stations. It should not be confused with Shoreditch Underground station (1869–2006) on the London Underground, situated about half a mile further south. It was also not the first main line railway station to possess the Shoreditch name; Bishopsgate (1840–1875) was originally given that name.

== Pre grouping history (1865-1922) ==
When the East and West India Docks and Birmingham Junction Railway (known as the North London Railway (NLR) from 1853) started operating on 26 September 1850, they shared a London terminus at Fenchurch Street railway station with the London and Blackwall Railway which involved a circuitous route from north London via Hackney, Bow and East Stepney for city bound passengers. The North London Railway (City Branch) Act 1861 (24 & 25 Vict. c. cxcvi) gave the NLR powers to build a two-mile extension from Dalston to a new London terminus at Broad Street railway station (England). The majority of the line was built on a viaduct now known as the Dalston Viaduct. A significant number of properties were demolished to make way for the new railway.

The original railway had three tracks and Shoreditch station had three platform faces. (Note: The memories and writings of a London Railwayman by A A Jackson incorrectly states on Page 68 that platforms were provided on all four roads.) It was situated partly on the viaduct and partly on the bridge over Old Street. It was a flat roofed square two storey brick station building located on the corner of Kingsland Road and Old Street. Connor suggests the ticket office was at street level and stairs took you up to platform level which were accommodated within the building. The structure had a number of elegant arched windows and was typical of many NLR stations. There were a number of structures, mostly of timber construction, on the platforms containing offices, waiting rooms etc.

The station was opened on 1 November 1865 - the same date as Broad Street and services started operating to Poplar (East India Road) station.

A fourth track which did not have a platform face was added in July 1874 and used by other NLR passenger services (e.g. to Richmond) and goods trains to and from Broad Street goods depots.

The first signal box was located north of the island platform between the two sets of running lines and this was relocated on 5 December 1875 during platform lengthening work. A second signal box was added (about halfway up the island platform on the west side of the line) in April 1893 and the two signal boxes were named Shoreditch No 1 and Shoreditch No 2 (the new box). This arrangement lasted until 1909 when No 1 box was abolished and No 2 box reverted to the name Shoreditch. Tram traffic began to take a sizable part of the stations business during the early part of the 20th Century and Sunday services were withdrawn on 20 May 1918. The London & North Western Railway (LNWR) took over the working of the North London Railway under a common management arrangement on 1 February 1909 although the North London Railway continued to exist until 1922.

In 1916 the two westerly lines were electrified for Broad Street to Richmond services and the two sets of running lines were known as No. 2 Electrics (west side of viaduct) and No 1 Steam (east side of the viaduct). A few up electric services did call at Shoreditch as there was no fourth platform provided.

=== Services ===
It was initially served by local services from Broad Street to Poplar (East India Road) railway station on the City Extension of the North London Railway. Between 1870 and 1890 some Poplar services were extended to/from Blackwall on the Great Eastern Railway line from Fenchurch Street.

Later Great Northern Railway services to New Barnet, Alexandra Palace, High Barnet and Gordon Hill called during the peak hours.

=== Shoreditch (Dunloe Street depot) ===
This depot handled coal traffic and was located a quarter of a mile north of the station on the east side of the line. It was opened by the LNWR in March 1893 and closed in June 1968.

A signal box was located here on the west side of the line. This opened in 1892 and was closed in 1976.

The eastward extension that used to accommodate the site has been largely demolished and appears to be used for container storage at the northern end. A small section exists south of Cremer Street which is where the southern rail exit to the sidings was located.

== London Midland & Scottish Railway (1923-1940) ==
Following the Railways Act 1921, also known as the grouping act, operation of the station fall under the control of the London Midland & Scottish Railway.

The station building was replaced between 1925 and 1928 as part of a road widening scheme undertaken by the London County Council and was an attractive three story pale red brick building built in the style of the time. The design was complemented by stone work including the words "LM1928SR" and the winged symbol they then used. The exit was at the corner of Kingsland Road and Old Street and the arrival hall attractively laid out in ceramic tiles. These were a buff colour with burnt orange, black and brown detailing. The subway to the island was done out in white glazed brick and the station building now included a parcels office.

Following that, services were withdrawn on 6 October 1940 following air raid damage in World War II elsewhere on the line although Connor suggests trains had not run for some weeks previously. The station stayed open selling tickets until 17 November 1941.

== After closure (1940-present day) ==
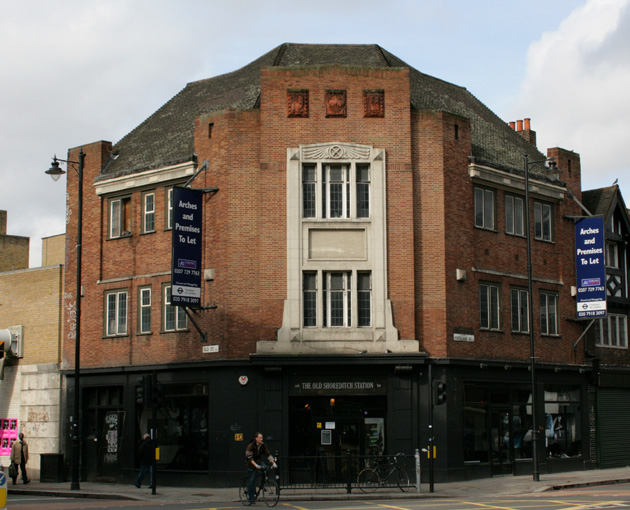
Shoreditch railway station building in 2007

The Poplar service continued to pass through Shoreditch but this was withdrawn on 15 May 1944 due to bomb damage between Dalston and Poplar and declining passenger numbers.

The following August the station building was slightly damaged by a V-1 rocket explosion.

After the war the station building was taken over by a dress making firm. The wooden platform awnings were taken down between 1953 and 1956 and during late 1965 most of the other timber platform level buildings were removed down. The buildings that housed the stairwells survived along with some brick structures but these succumbed in late 1971. The platforms also remained intact until they were demolished in 2005, in conjunction with the East London line extension project.

The "Steam" lines (also known as No 1 lines) were lifted sometime during the 1970s and traffic declined at Broad Street until that station was closed on 30 June 1986 with the former No 2 electric lines being lifted soon after.

After that the track bed through the station remained overgrown and unused until the East London Line extension was opened in 2010.

The station did not re-open as part of the East London Line extension but a new station called Shoreditch High Street was constructed nearby. The line does however pass through the Shoreditch station site.

The station's buildings on the corner of Old Street and Kingsland Road remain intact and are in use as commercial premises within which the original stairs to the platforms remain intact.

== Notes ==
Preceding station	Disused railways	Following station
Haggerston; Line and station open	London and North Western Railway; North London Railway	London Broad Street; Line and station closed
