= East London line extension =

Railway engineering project in London

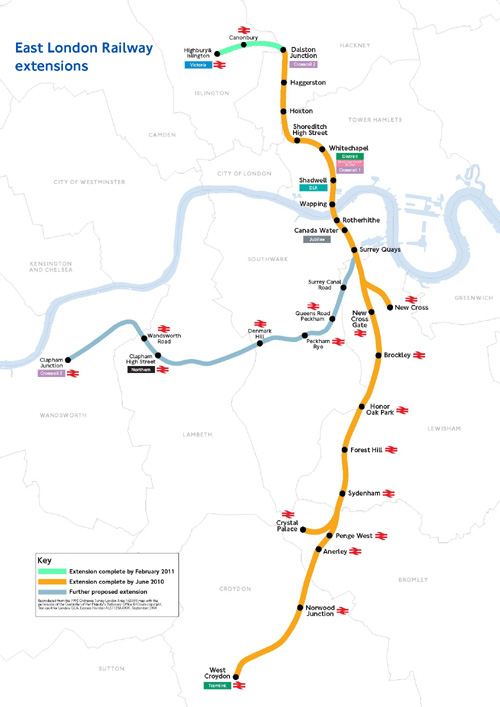
East London Line Extension plans.

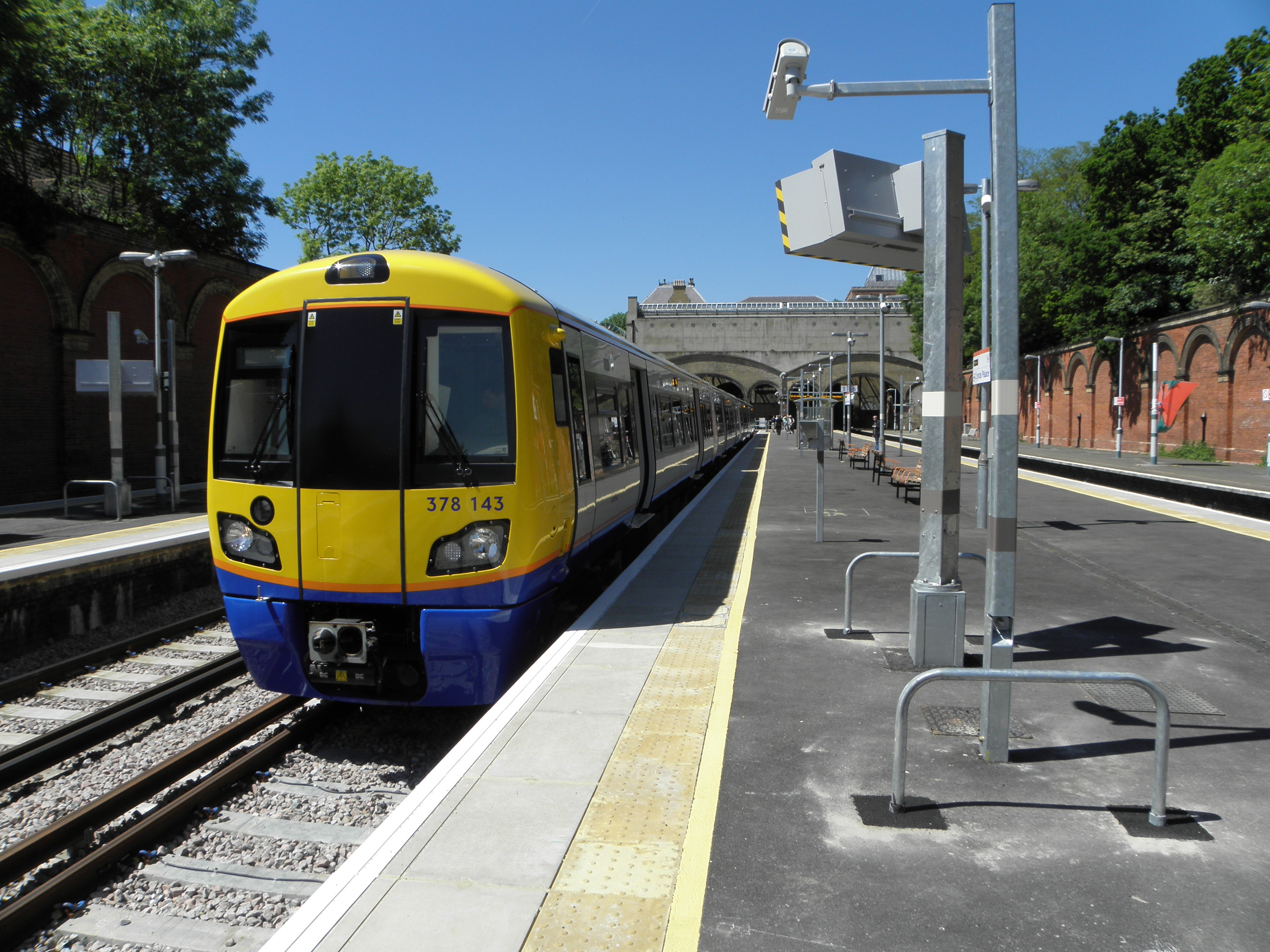
A London Overground train at Crystal Palace

The East London line extension (ELLX) project was a British railway engineering project in London, managed by Transport for London. The project involved extending the East London Line (formerly part of the London Underground network) and making it part of the mainline London Overground network. This was done by re-opening sections of disused railway line and by converting electrification, signalling, lineside signage and communication systems, etc. to mainline standards. New rolling stock was introduced and four new stations built along the route, with a fifth scheduled to be added in the future at New Bermondsey.

The work, which cost around £1 billion, began in 2005 and was carried out in two phases. The first phase was completed on 23 May 2010 with a service from Dalston Junction via the historic Thames Tunnel under the River Thames and along part of the Brighton Main Line to West Croydon and Crystal Palace. Trains also go to New Cross, where they make a connection with the South Eastern Main Line. On 28 February 2011, the line was connected at its northern end to the North London Line at Highbury & Islington. In the second phase of the project, on 9 December 2012, a branch was connected to the South London Line enabling services to run to Clapham Junction.

== Project overview ==
=== Phase 1 ===
Phase 1 of the ELLX project involved the extension of the original line at its northern and southern ends. The northern extension runs from Whitechapel to Highbury & Islington, connecting with the North London Line; this section became operational as far as Dalston Junction in late May 2010, and to Highbury & Islington on 28 February 2011, with trains every five minutes on the central section between Dalston Junction and Surrey Quays. The southern extension of phase one from New Cross Gate to Crystal Palace and West Croydon was completed simultaneously with that to Dalston in 2010, and a full service began in May 2010.

The northern extension makes use of disused trackbeds on the Kingsland Viaduct that formerly carried the North London Railway branch to Broad Street station, which was closed to the national rail system in 1986. It bypasses Shoreditch station, which closed permanently in June 2006. The new line diverges before reaching Shoreditch station, traverses the former site of the Bishopsgate Goods Yard and crosses Shoreditch High Street on a bridge before running north along Kingsland Viaduct. Four new stations have been built at Shoreditch High Street, Hoxton, Haggerston and Dalston Junction. From there, the double-track line continues under Kingsland High Street and Boleyn Road, and then parallels the existing North London Line with services running through Canonbury (for interchange with the North London Line eastbound) to Highbury & Islington (for interchange with the Victoria line, North London Line westbound and Northern City Line).

The stations between New Cross Gate and Crystal Palace/West Croydon were previously managed by Southern, which ran all train services to these stations before they were later transferred to TfL control.

The existing section of line was completely overhauled; all of the tracks were replaced and signalling was upgraded to Network Rail standards.

=== Phase 2 ===
The ELLX Phase 2 project extended the line from Surrey Quays to the Network Rail South London Line. Trains on this route run to Clapham Junction via Queens Road Peckham, Peckham Rye, Denmark Hill, Clapham High Street and Wandsworth Road. From Wandsworth Road, instead of running to Victoria, westbound trains branch off at Factory Junction and pass through Battersea towards Clapham Junction.

After a period of uncertainty, funding for this phase was announced in February 2009 with a prospective completion date of May 2012, in time for the start of the 2012 Summer Olympic and Paralympic Games, which were held in London in July 2012. TfL, however, postponed the opening date to 9 December 2012.

A new station at Surrey Canal Road was proposed. In September 2010, funding for this was refused by the Department for Transport but the developer Renewal later agreed to fund it as part of its Surrey Canal development scheme, which was due to start in 2013, and Lewisham Council granted planning permission. The new station was planned to open in 2015, depending on the pace of new housing development in the vicinity.

At Clapham Junction, former Platform 2 was divided into two staggered platforms; Platform 1 for the existing Overground services to/from Willesden Junction and Stratford, and Platform 2 for the new services to/from Highbury & Islington. In addition, a disused staircase at Platform 2 was brought back into use and a new lift was installed to improve access from the newly refurbished Grant Road entrance.

Trains run every 15 minutes between Clapham Junction and Highbury & Islington. There were no plans to operate trains through from the South London line to the West London line so passengers would have to change from one to the other at Clapham Junction. Transport for London took over the management of Clapham High Street and Wandsworth Road stations when the new service started.

=== Train services and rolling stock ===
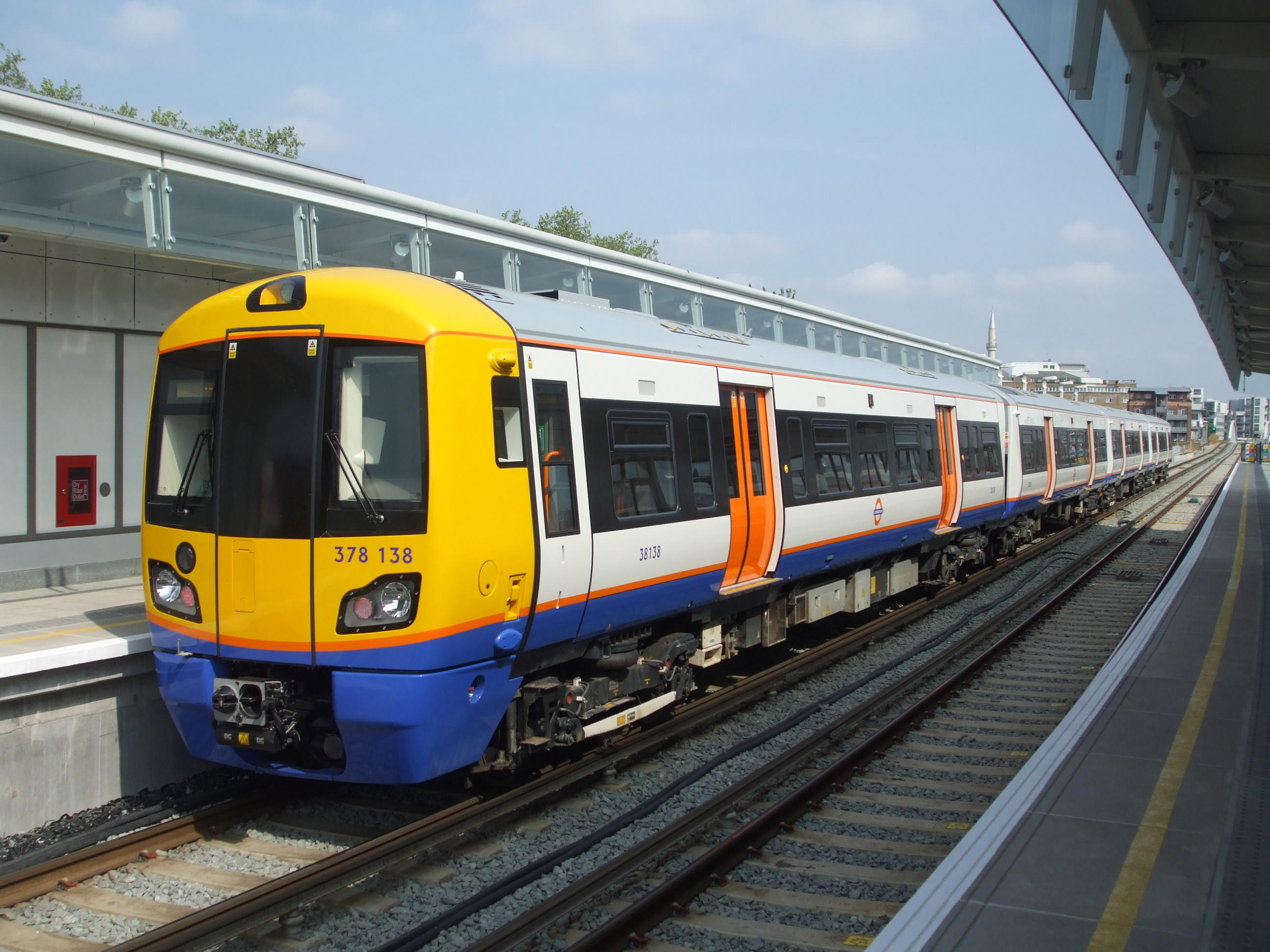
A new Class 378 train at Hoxton

The core section of the line between Dalston and Surrey Quays is served by 16 trains per hour. New Cross Gate to Sydenham has eight trains per hour. The remainder of the line is served by four trains per hour. The new line serves 30 stations.

As part of the upgrade, new mainline rolling stock replaced the former London Underground A60 and A62 Stock, which had been in service for 50 years. As of 2012 the line operated 23 Class 378/1 "Capitalstar" four-car electric multiple units, which are similar to the Class 376 already in use by Southeastern), although some five-car units have since been introduced to meet demand. Unlike the London Underground stock they replaced, the trains have longitudinal seating similar to most classes of Tube trains to cater for the expected increase in use.

=== Transfer to London Overground ===
The stations between New Cross Gate, Crystal Palace and West Croydon were previously managed by Southern but London Overground took over control of these stations in September 2009 in preparation for the new London Overground services.

=== Contractors ===
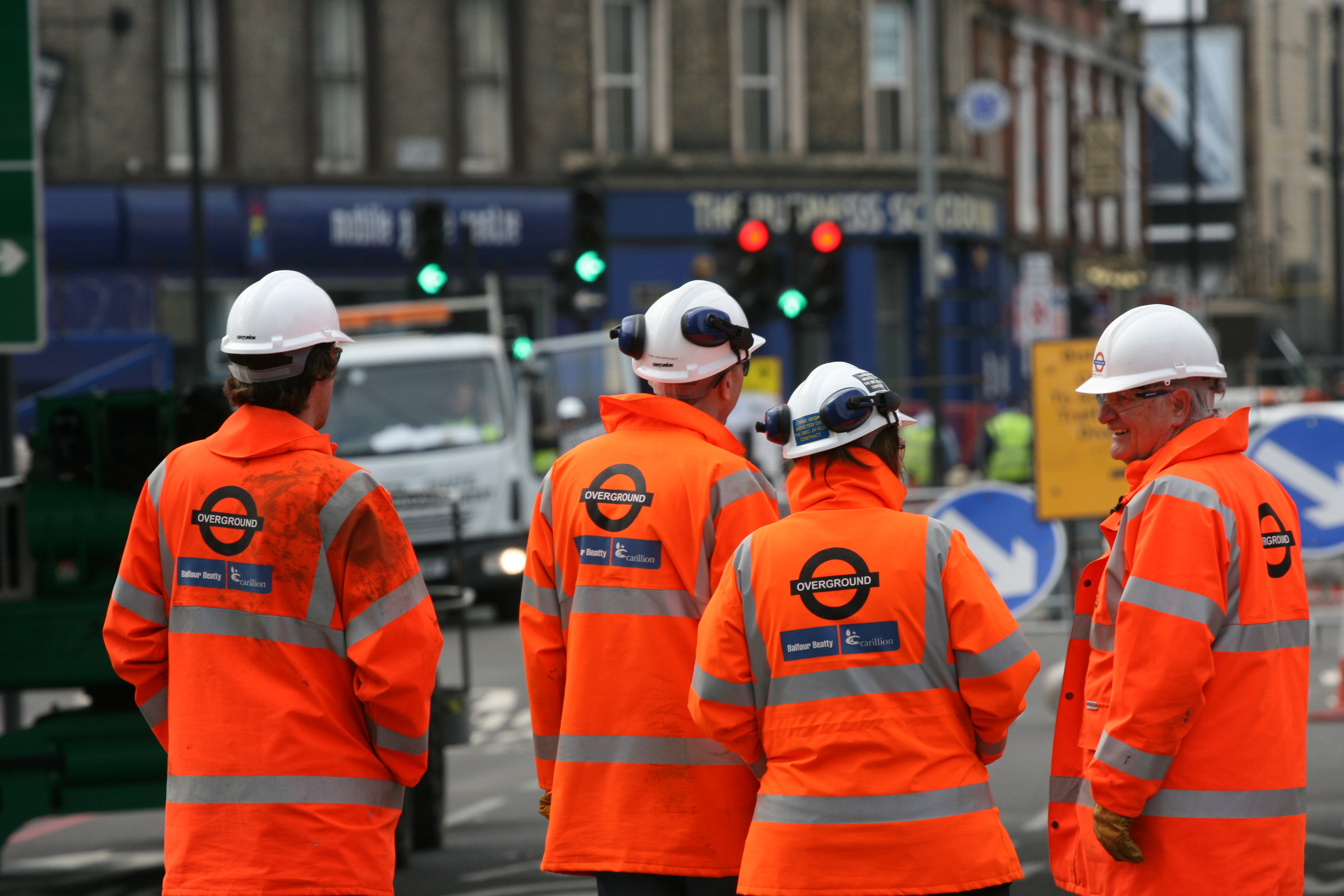
Balfour Beatty/Carillion contractors on-site at Shoreditch

TfL selected Parsons Brinckerhoff as the programme managers in May 2005 and in June that year, TfL awarded Taylor Woodrow a £30 million contract to undertake enabling works on Kingsland Viaduct and other sites. Mott MacDonald was appointed the project's technical advisor. The main works on the line were undertaken by a consortium of the engineering and construction groups Balfour Beatty and Carillion. In October 2006, TfL announced the two companies had been awarded a £363 million contract to carry out the work, beating a rival consortium made up of Laing O'Rourke, AMEC Spie and Vinci. Some 2,000 jobs were planned to have been created at the peak of the contract and the contractors were obliged to hire local staff. The contract awarded bonuses to the contractors if they completed work ahead of schedule but penalised them up to £50,000 a day for late delivery.

Carillion was also awarded a contract to maintain the extended line. The seven-year, £80 million contract, which was announced in February 2009, required Carillion to provide TfL with management, technical resources, plant, equipment and labour.

Bombardier supplied the line's rolling stock as part of a £259 million contract to provide trains for the London Overground network. In August 2006, Transport for London placed an initial £223 million order for 152 carriages comprising 20 four-coach trains for the East London line and 24 three-coach trains for the North London line. The order was expanded during July 2007 at an additional cost of £36 million to provide another three trains for the East London line. Manufacturing work began at Bombardier's Derby plant at the start of 2008; the last train was scheduled to be delivered by May 2010. The company beat the other bidders Siemens, Hitachi, and the rolling stock operating company Porterbrook, which would have supplied pre-owned trains.

=== Funding ===
On 12 October 2004, the Mayor of London confirmed phase one of the East London Line Project would be delivered as part of the Capital Investment Programme. On 16 November 2004, he announced control of the project had passed from the Strategic Rail Authority to TfL so the project could be initiated and funded from TfL's five-year investment programme. The planned service was initially described as a "metro-style (National Rail) train service".

The bulk of the funding for phase one of the project was provided by the European Investment Bank, which lent TfL £450m (€660m). The bank's involvement was intended to promote the regeneration of the deprived areas of London, through which the line runs. The second phase of the project was co-funded by the Department for Transport, which provided £64 million, and TfL provided £11 million. This funding did not cover the £10 million cost of building a new station at Surrey Canal Road and it remained unclear whether the station would be built, but provision was made for it to be built at a later date. It was suggested Millwall Football Club might contribute to the cost of the new station, which would be close to The Den football ground.

== History ==
=== Proposals and problems ===
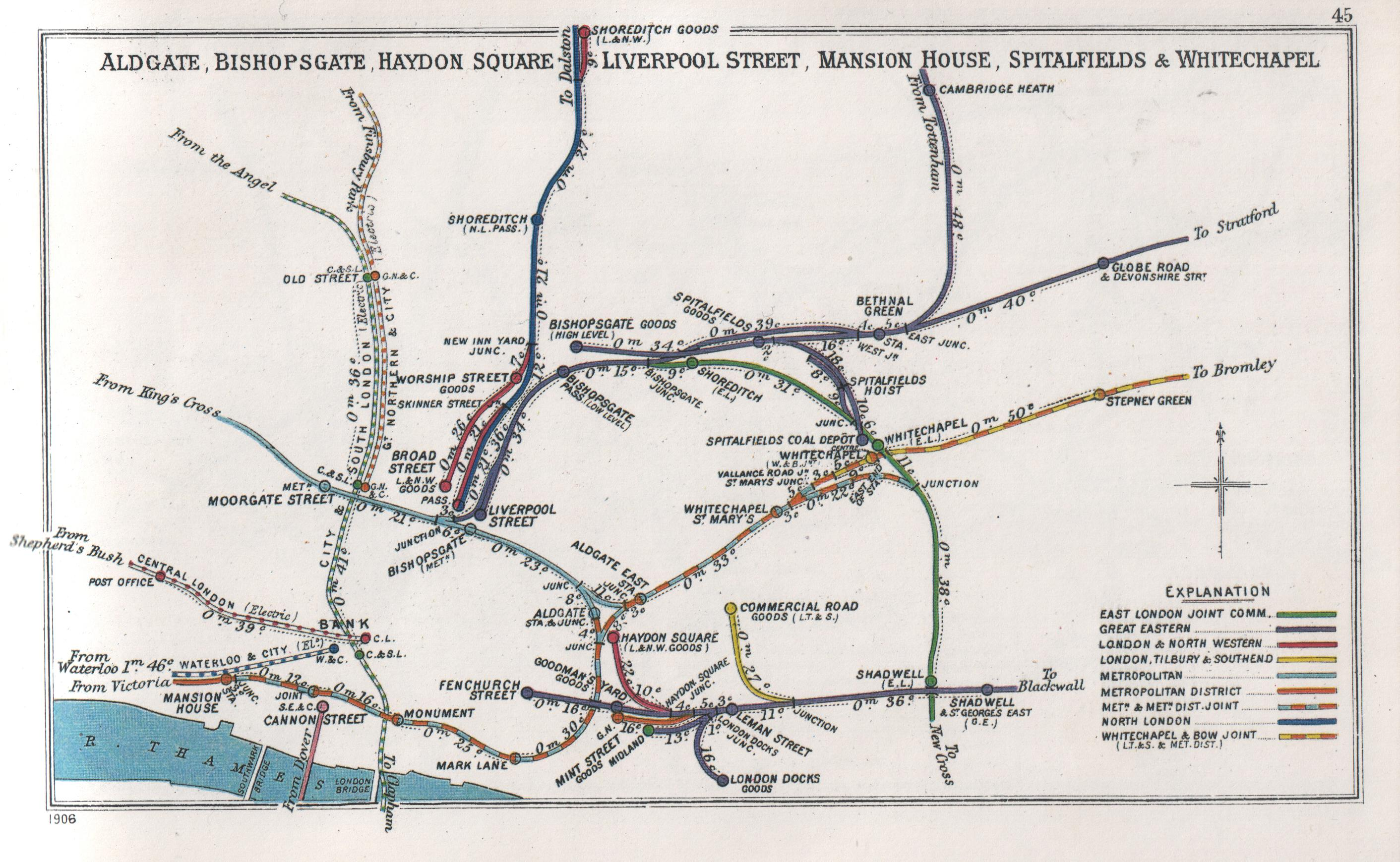
1906 diagram showing the former connection of the East London Line to Liverpool Street

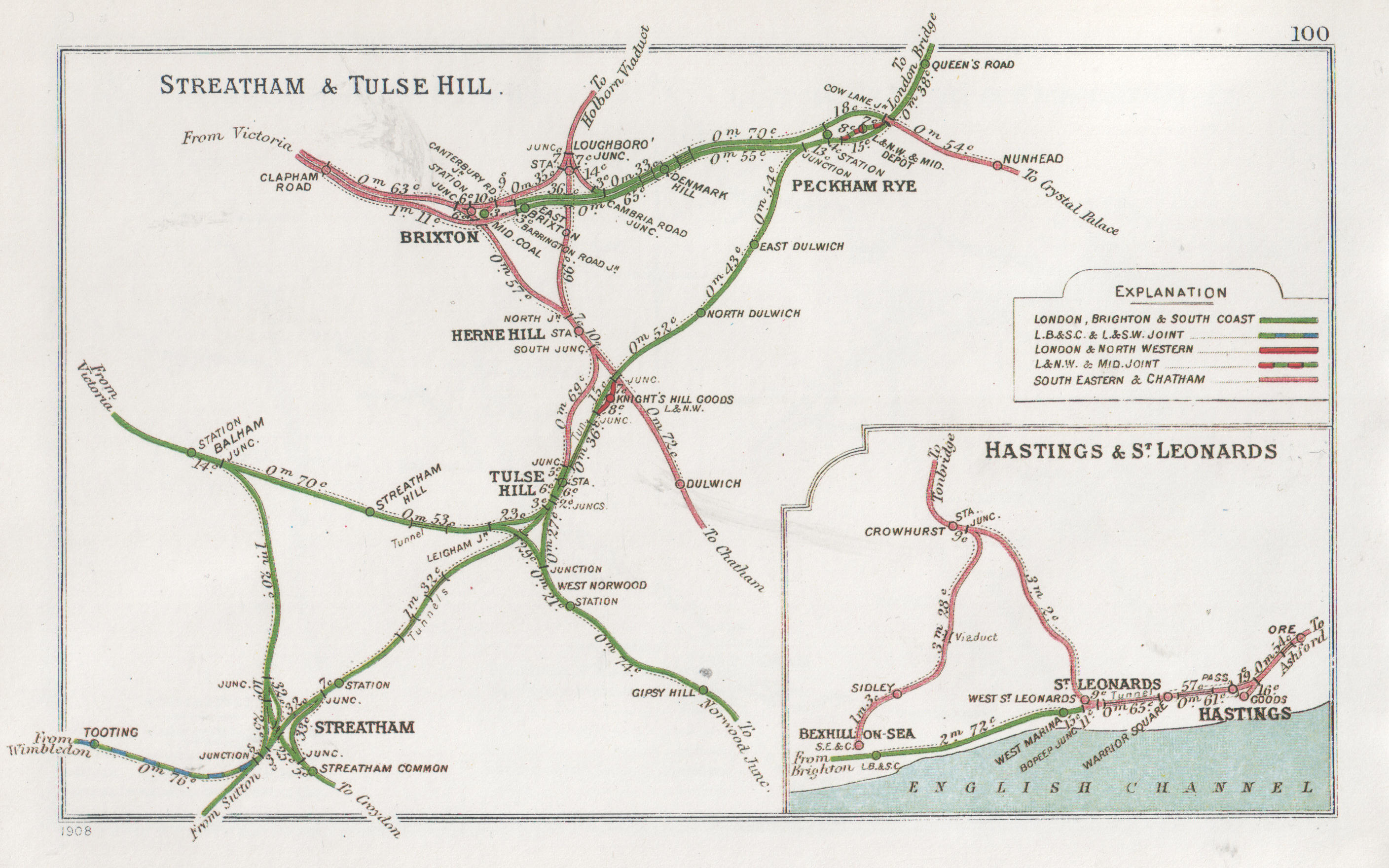
The alternative routes from Peckham Rye via East Dulwich and via Denmark Hill in 1908

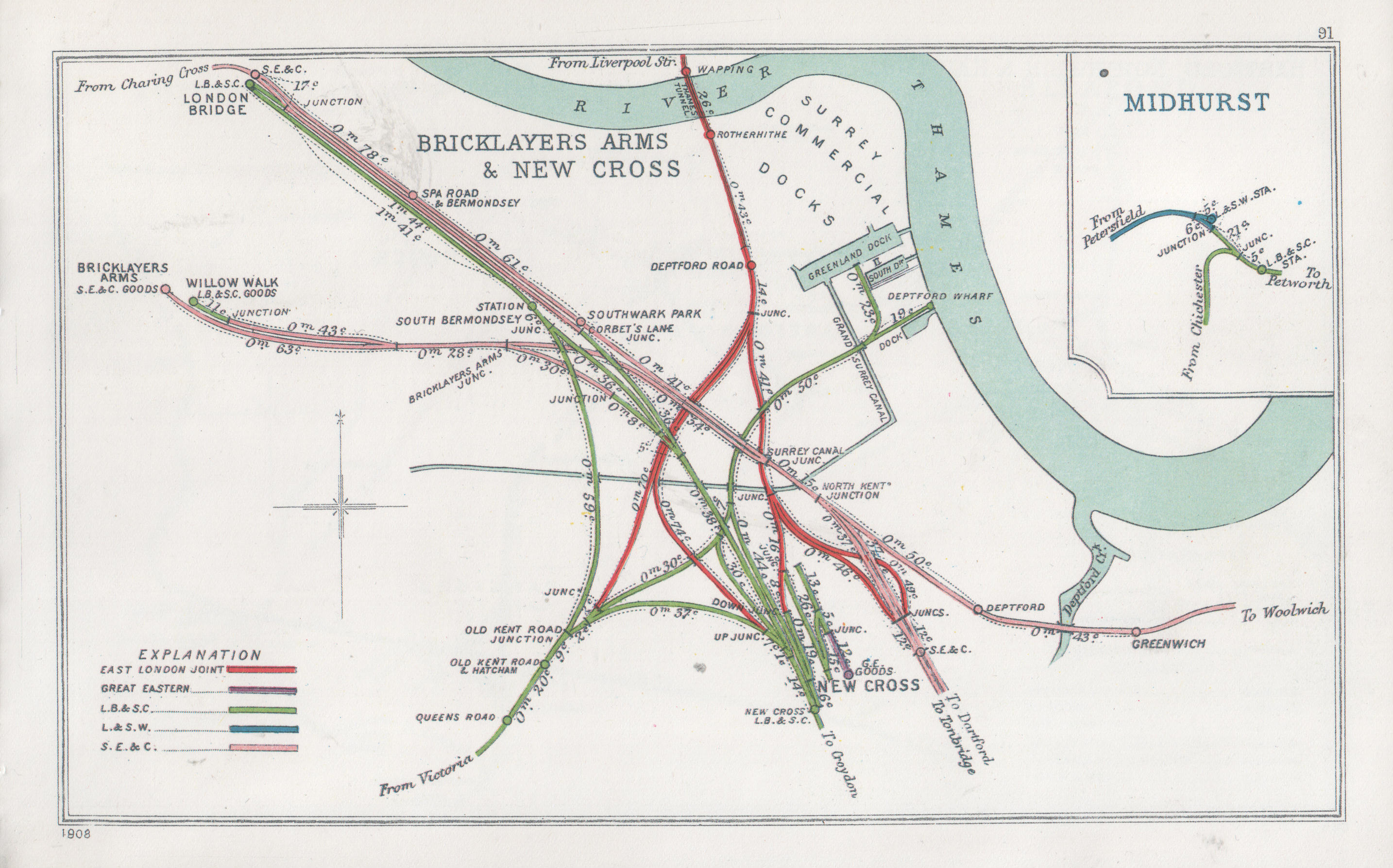
Diagram of the New Cross end of the East London line (1914) showing junctions to the southern routes

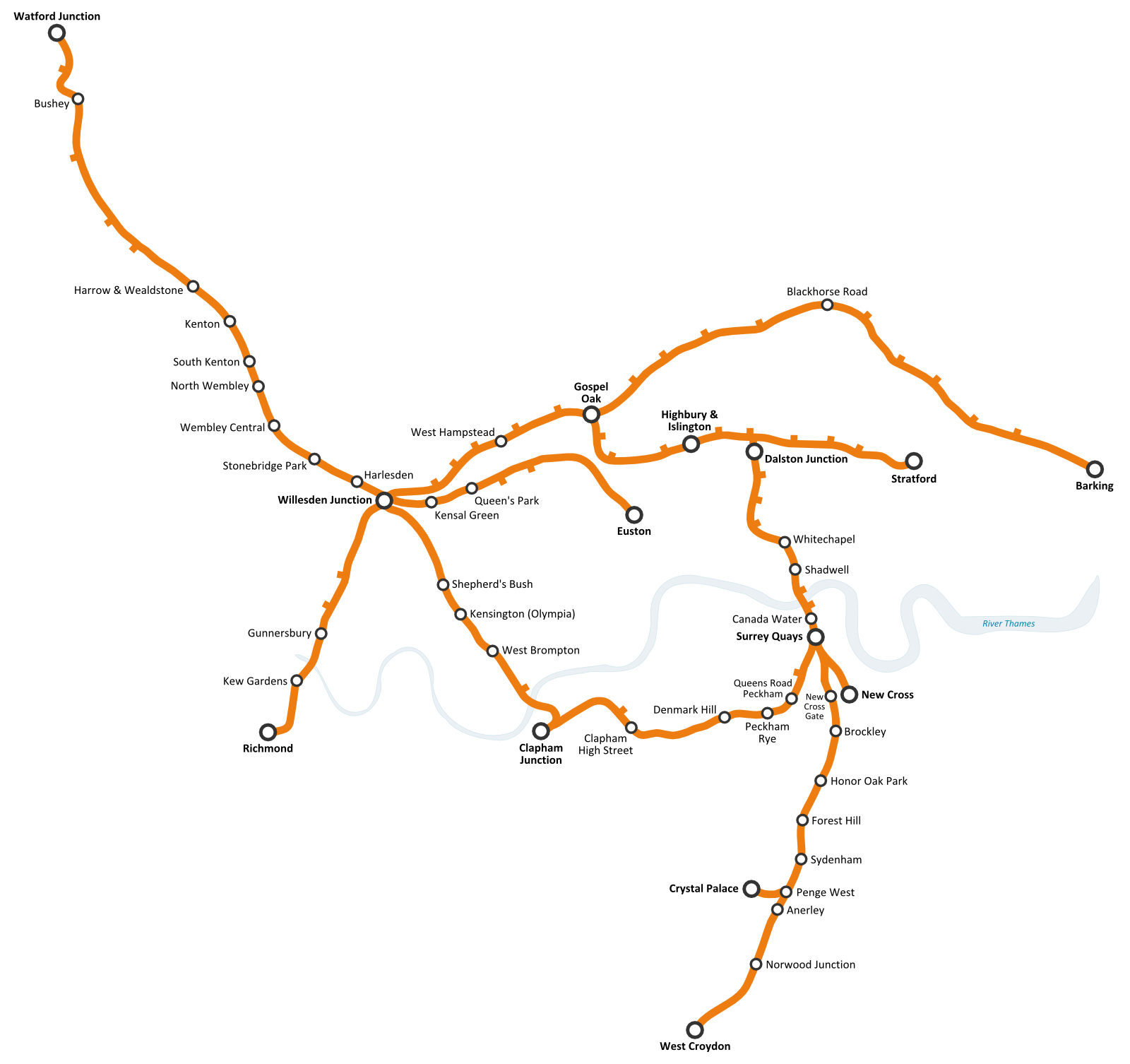
The East London line within the orbital London Overground system (as completed in 2012)

Extensions of the East London line have been discussed for many years. During the 1980s London Transport considered converting the line into a light railway similar to the Docklands Light Railway, or restoring the disused connection to Liverpool Street. By 1989 a proposal had emerged to extend it north to Dalston and south to Peckham Rye and Dulwich, sharing track and stations with the mainline network, in a similar fashion to parts of the Bakerloo line, District line and Metropolitan line. The plan was costed at £100-£120 million and the extended line was envisaged to open in 1994. The extension project was proposed several times during the 1990s but was repeatedly rejected or postponed owing to a lack of government support and insufficient financing. In November 1990, Transport Secretary Cecil Parkinson rejected a proposed parliamentary bill that would have authorised the project and two years later the extension plans were postponed indefinitely owing to cutbacks in Tube funding. Another proposal was made in 1993 to extend the line from Whitechapel to Dalston Junction, involving the construction of new stations at Bishopsgate, Hoxton and Haggerston, and received the support of a public inquiry in 1994. Construction was envisaged to begin in 1996 and to be completed by 1998. The project was finally approved by the Government in 1996, however, a lack of financing again forced the project to be put on hold only a year later.

A solution to the funding issue was found in 1999 when London Transport announced that it was seeking private funds to realise the extension plans. Control of the project was given to the Strategic Rail Authority rather than to London Underground, in view of the impact that it would have on mainline services. It was also proposed that the East London line and other sub-surface Underground lines would be transferred to Railtrack, the privatised company responsible for maintaining the mainline network. This would have seen the line integrated with the London suburban commuter network. However, it was soon decided that this was impractical and the Railtrack proposal was abandoned.

Network Rail's South London Route Utilisation Strategy in 2008 considered changes to the South London Line services unavoidable, particularly in respect of the even more restricted capacity during the reconstruction of London Bridge.

=== Alternative routes ===
A number of different routeing proposals were put forward before the route of the northern, southern and western extensions was finalised.

The southerly route across south London's existing network of suburban railways underwent many changes before a final route was decided. Initial proposals around 1992 envisaged the western extension running from Peckham Rye to East Dulwich.

=== Construction ===
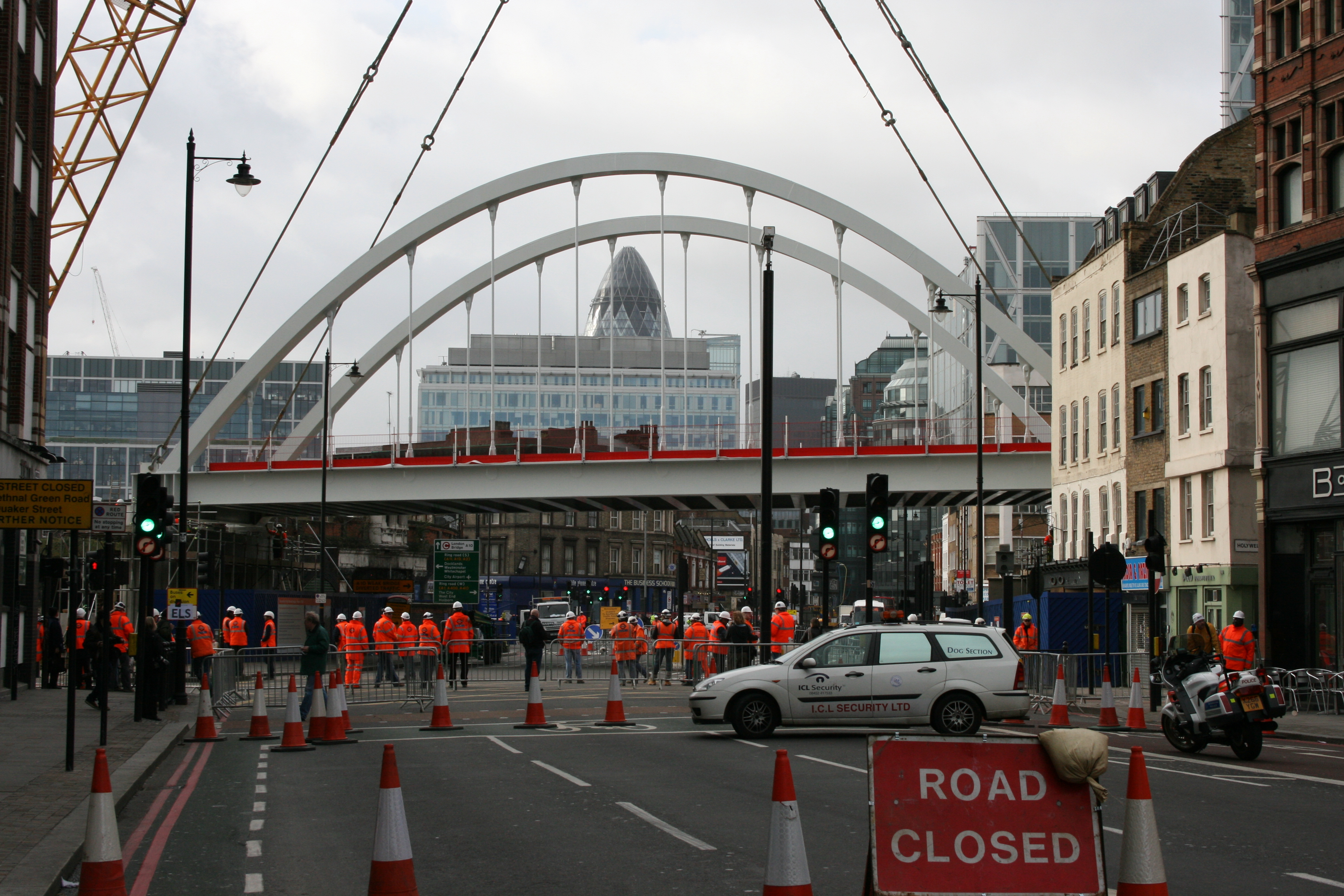
The new Shoreditch High Street bridge is lowered into place on 29 March 2008

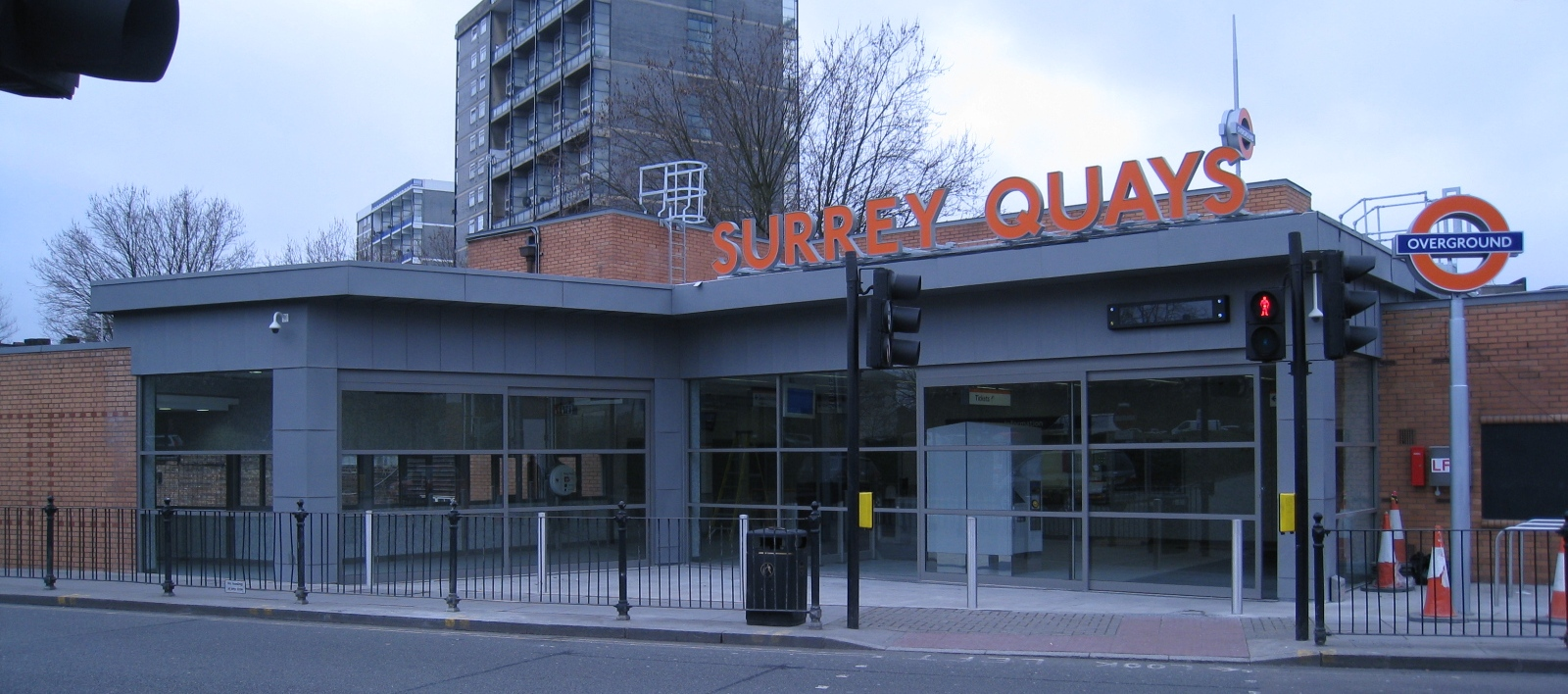
Surrey Quays station with new London Overground branding

The East London Line extension project was officially initiated by the Government on 9 October 2001, with construction of the northern extension due to begin in December 2001. However, it was held up when it came to light that the Grade II listed 19th-century Braithwaite arches in the former Bishopsgate Goods Yard were to be demolished as part of the project. Campaigners launched legal action against London Underground in an effort to prevent the demolition, but the project finally received legal clearance in the Court of Appeal on 7 July 2003.

Because of an inability to extend the platforms at the existing Wapping and Rotherhithe stations and make them fully compliant with current rail safety regulations, it was thought that they would close, but on 18 August 2004 Ken Livingstone, Mayor of London, announced that both stations would remain open.

Preparatory work by Taylor Woodrow began in June 2005 and continued through to the end of 2006, involving the replacement and refurbishment of 22 bridges along the Kingsland Viaduct. On 9 June 2006, Shoreditch underground station closed permanently to facilitate work on the extension, with services from Whitechapel being replaced by buses. The rest of the East London line closed on 22 December 2007, with rail replacement buses linking the stations north and south of the Thames (but not crossing the river due to height restrictions in the Rotherhithe Tunnel).

On 5 September 2006, it was announced that the line would transfer from London Underground to London Overground, branded with a version of the Underground roundel with red replaced by orange, the colour used on Tube maps for the East London Line.

Three major new bridges were installed on the line between March and May 2008. On 29 March 2008, a new bridge weighing 350 tonnes was lifted into place over Shoreditch High Street. The bridge was manufactured to a tied arch or bowstring design in Chepstow by engineering firm Fairfield Mabey, and was lowered into place by the UK's biggest mobile crane, weighing 1,200 tonnes.

On 3 May 2008, a 1,300-tonne Warren truss bridge (GE19 bridge) spanning Great Eastern Main Line tracks out of Liverpool Street station was put into place. Although the bridge launch was successful, on 28 May the bridge dropped 200 mm onto its permanent supports as it was being jacked down. Debris fell onto the tracks, forcing the suspension of services in and out of Liverpool Street station until the following day and causing major disruption to commuters. The problem was traced to errors made by the sub-contractors.

The last of the three bridges, a 600-ton truss steel structure, was put in place at New Cross Gate between 10 and 12 May 2008. Test running on the completed line began on 5 October 2009.

=== Re-opening ===
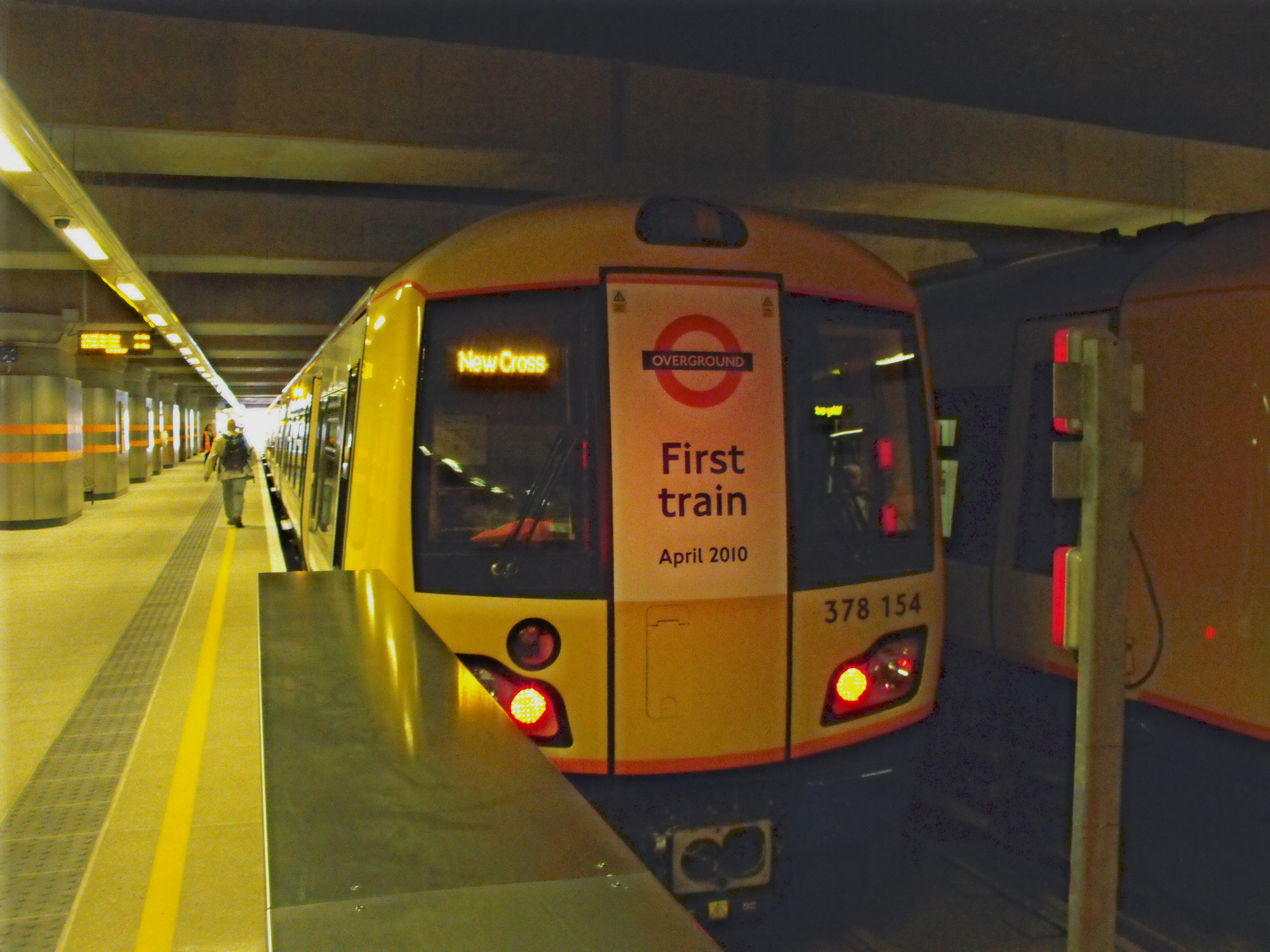
First train on the "preview" service, 27 April 2010.

Before the full service launch, a limited "preview" service began on 27 April 2010 between Dalston Junction and New Cross/New Cross Gate, and the line came into full operation between Dalston Junction and West Croydon/Crystal Palace on 23 May.

The proximity of the line re-opening date to the forthcoming parliamentary general election also generated speculation about political motives, with opposition parties suggesting Mayor Boris Johnson was seeking to make political capital out of a project originally begun by his predecessor and political opponent Ken Livingstone.

=== Highbury & Islington ===
On 28 February 2011 the line was extended northwards to Highbury & Islington.

== Gallery ==
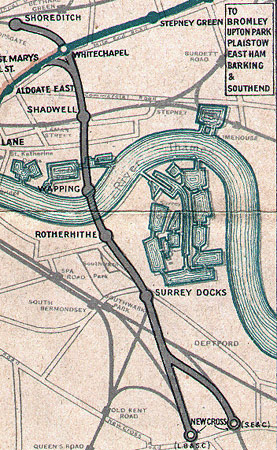
A 1915 map of the original East London Line

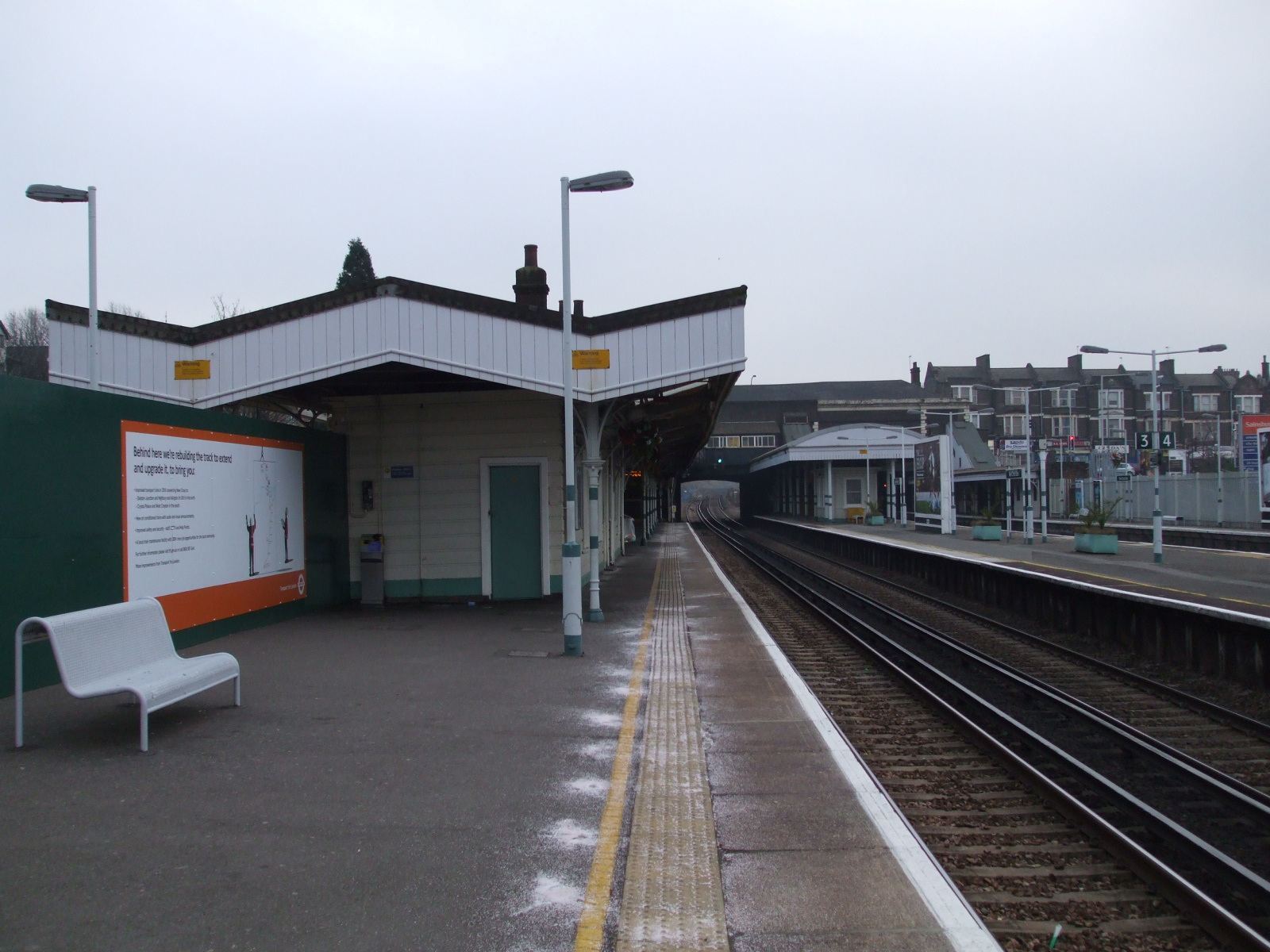
New Cross Gate, during conversion from Tube terminus to a through station

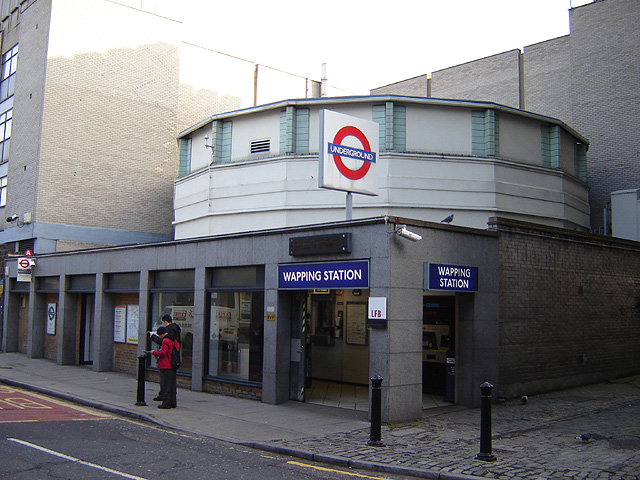
Wapping station in its last days as a Tube station

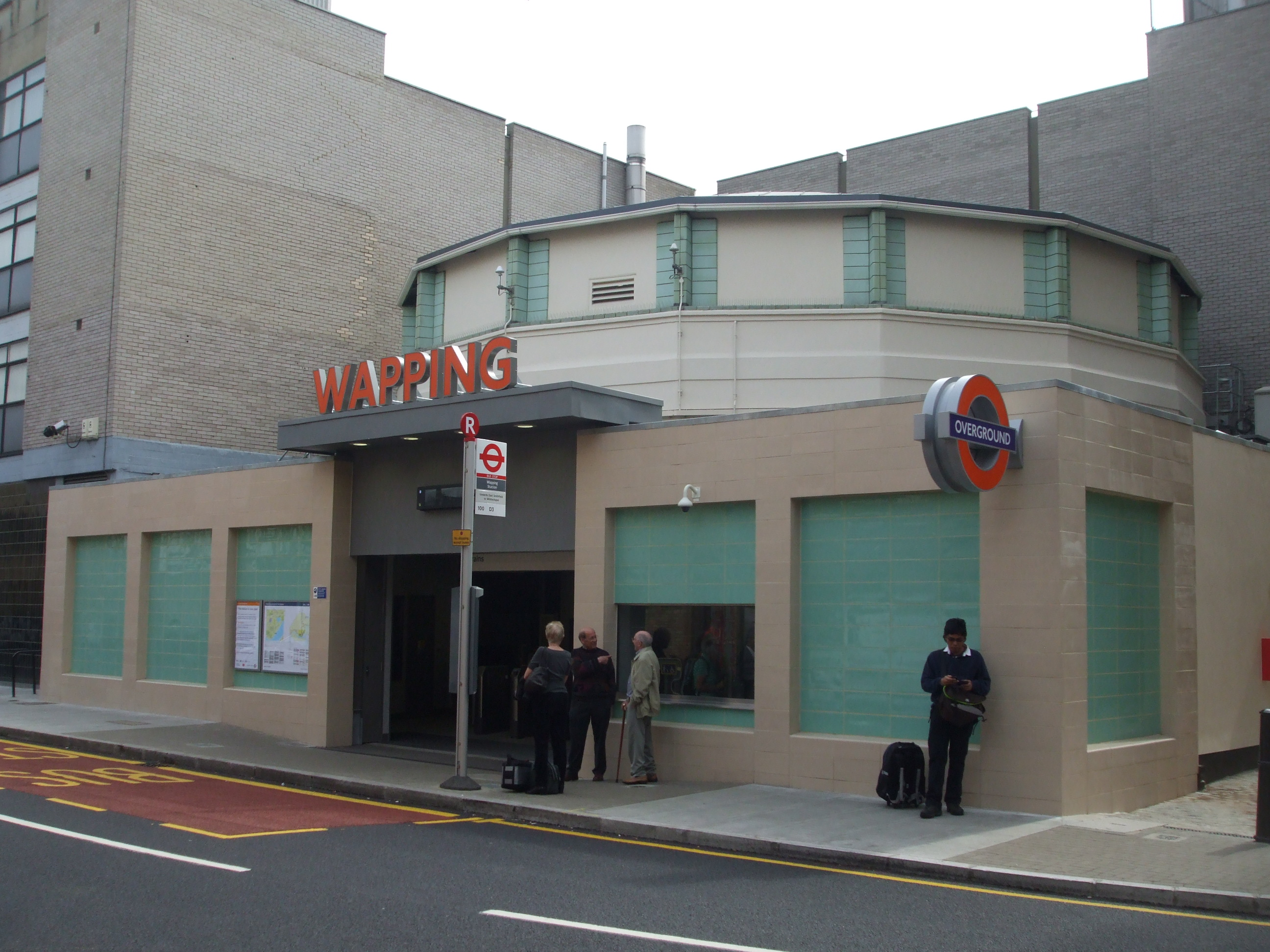
Wapping station after its conversion to London Overground

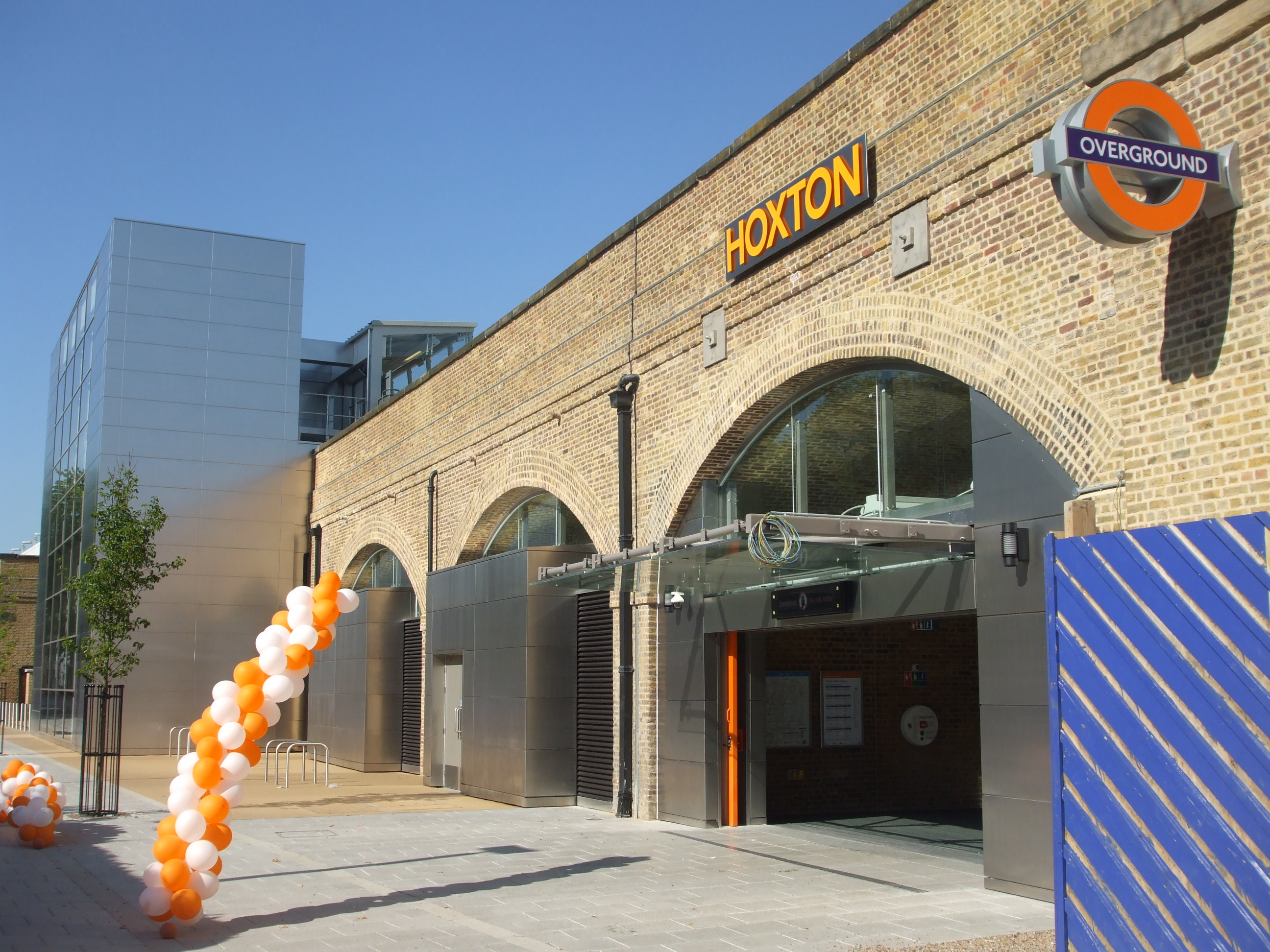
Hoxton station on the first day of full operation

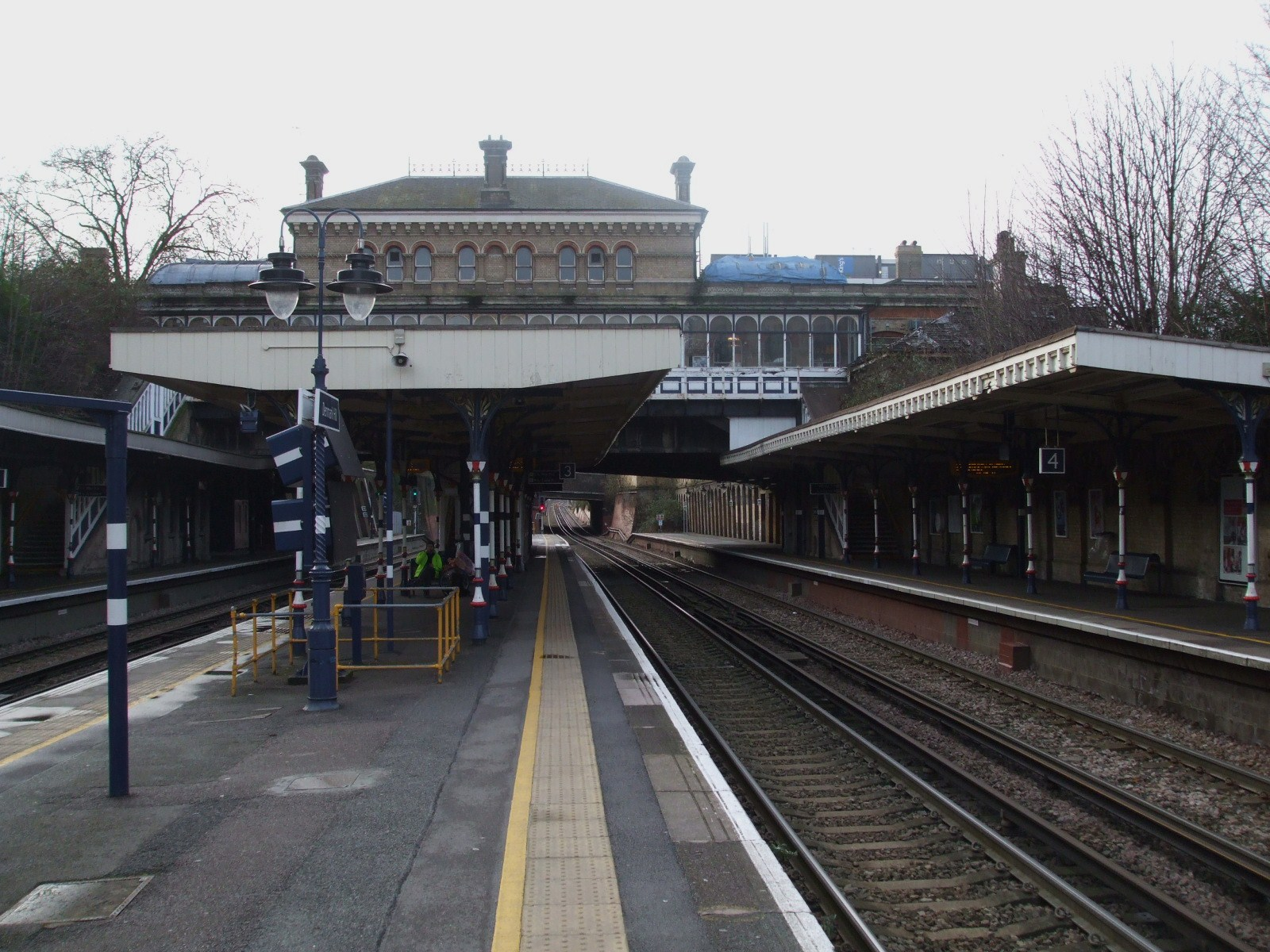
Denmark Hill is linked to the East London Line
