= Kingsland Viaduct =

Railway viaduct in London, England

Coordinates: 51.5318°N 0.0754°W

Kingsland Viaduct is a railway viaduct about 2 miles (3 km) in length from Shoreditch to Dalston in the London Borough of Hackney. It was built in the 1860s, but was disused from 1986 until it was reopened to carry the London Overground in 2010. The viaduct is owned by Transport for London. Since then it has carried East London Line services between Shoreditch High Street and Dalston.

== History ==
=== Initial operation ===
It was built as the main part of the North London City Extension, providing a more direct link from the North London Railway to the City of London (the City) at Broad Street, next door to the site that became Liverpool Street station.

Previously the North London Line's access from west of Dalston to the City was by a circuitous route via Hackney, Homerton, Bow and Stepney to Fenchurch Street. The extension, originally with three lines, shortened this considerably by providing a direct route from Dalston over the Kingsland Viaduct. It was authorised by the North London Railway (City Branch) Act 1861 (24 & 25 Vict. c. cxcvi) of 22 July 1861. It is said to have cost £1 million and displaced 4,500 people.

The extension was accessed by a triangular junction, accessible from both the west and east directions on the North London Railway.

Passenger traffic into Broad Street began on 1 November 1865, and was said to have doubled the number of passengers to 14 million in 1868. Initially, there were services at fifteen-minute intervals to both Hampstead and Bow.

A fourth line was added to the extension in 1874. Broad Street originally had seven platforms, extended to eight in 1891 and nine in 1913. The lines were electrified with two conductor rails at 600 V DC, with services beginning on 1 October 1916, using Oerlikon rolling stock. However, only the western five platforms at Broad Street served electrified lines, the remaining lines being unelectrified. Electric services to Watford did not begin until 10 July 1922.

=== Reopening ===
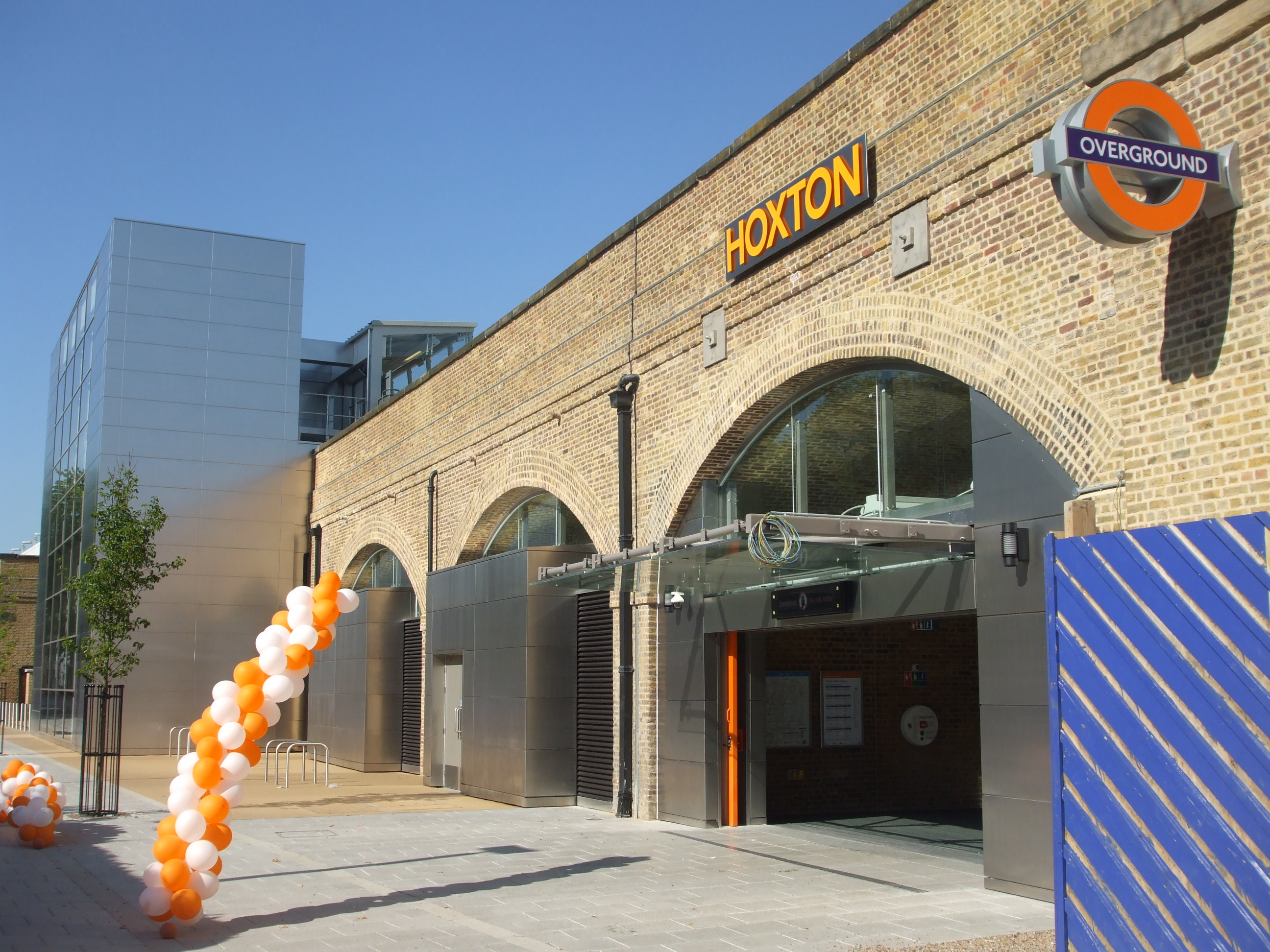
Newly built Hoxton station (2010) on the viaduct

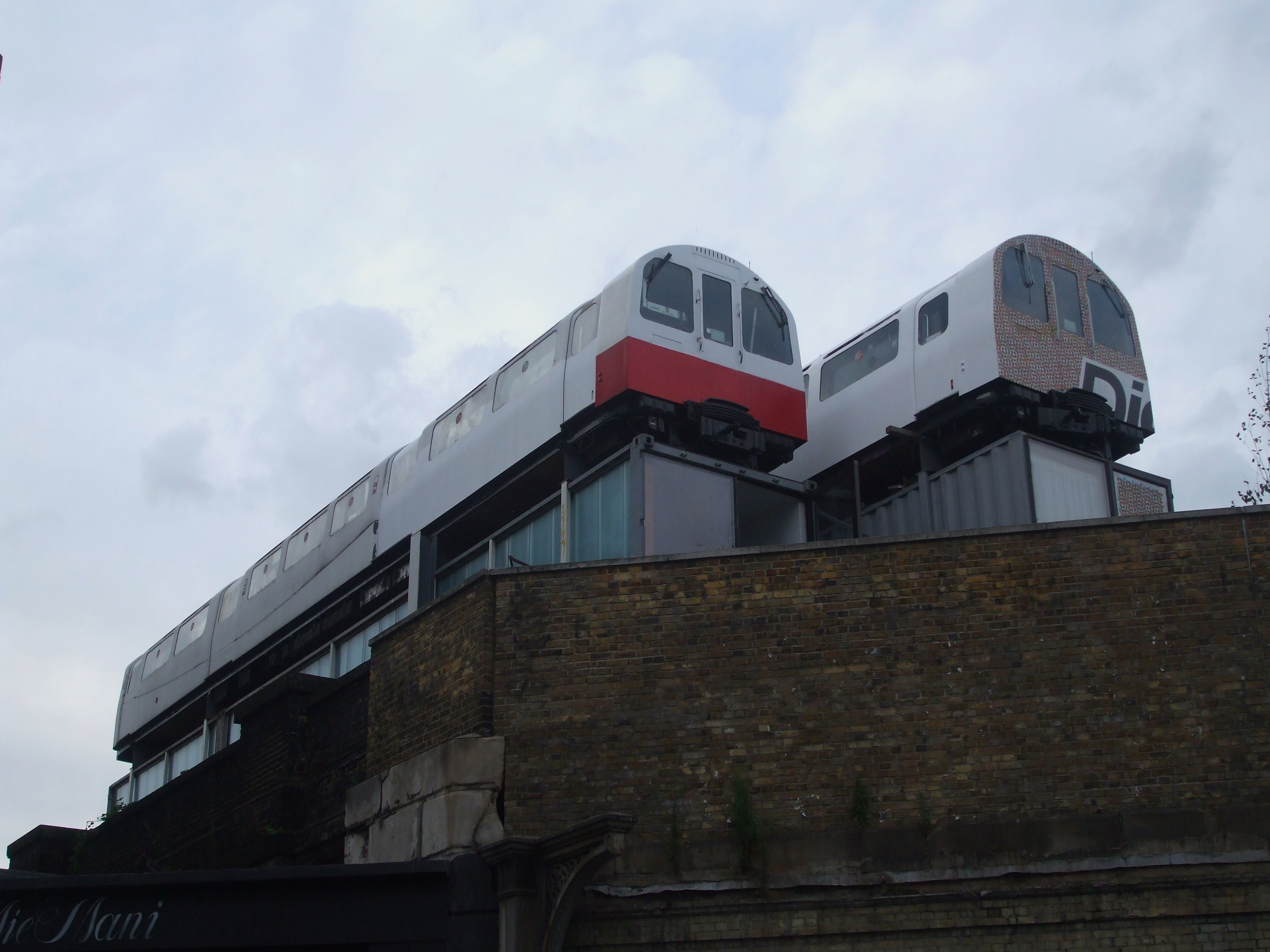
Old tube trains reused as artists' studios on the disused southern segment of the viaduct

The last scheduled train over the viaduct was on 27 June 1986, after which the line and its remaining stations were all closed.

After that there were proposals in 1993 to extend London Underground's East London Line along it from its Shoreditch terminus to Dalston Junction. The plan received the support of a public inquiry in 1994 and it was envisaged that the construction of the extension and the station itself would begin in 1996, to be completed by 1998. The project was finally approved by the Government in 1996 but a lack of funding forced the project to be delayed in 1997.

However, in 2007 the London Overground was created, which included the North London Line (the North London railway to which the viaduct connects at Dalston), and the East London Line was transferred to the London Overground to be extended south and to the north to meet the North London Line. To do this it followed the 1993 route along the Kingsland Viaduct. Work was complete in 2010 and on 27 April 2010 services began along the viaduct for the first time in over two decades.

To facilitate this the viaduct has been refurbished, and many bridges over roads replaced; a remnant of the brick viaduct between New Inn Yard and Holywell Lane was demolished to make way for a connecting concrete viaduct to the new bridge over Shoreditch High Street.

The southern end of the viaduct, from the old Broad Street/Liverpool Street terminus and where the East London Line crosses onto the viaduct at Hollywell Lane, has been given over to development, including the Broadgate Tower.

== Stations ==
There were four stations on and adjacent to the viaduct:

- Dalston Junction was at the bottom of the incline to the north of the viaduct, at the apex of the triangular junction, actually below street level.
- Haggerston, not to be confused with the earlier NLR station on a slightly different site
- Shoreditch, straddling Old Street and parallel to Shoreditch High Street, not to be confused with the former (closed) London Underground station of the same name, some distance to the east
- Broad Street, at the southern end of the viaduct, which had suburban services throughout its existence, and limited main line services.

As of 2010, the new stations on the extended viaduct, or adjacent, are;

- A rebuilt Dalston Junction on the same site as before.
- A rebuilt Haggerston station slightly to the north.
- Hoxton, a completely new station, opposite the rear of the Museum of the Home.
- Shoreditch High Street, a completely new station.
