= Dalston Junction railway station =

Railway station in London, England

Dalston Junction
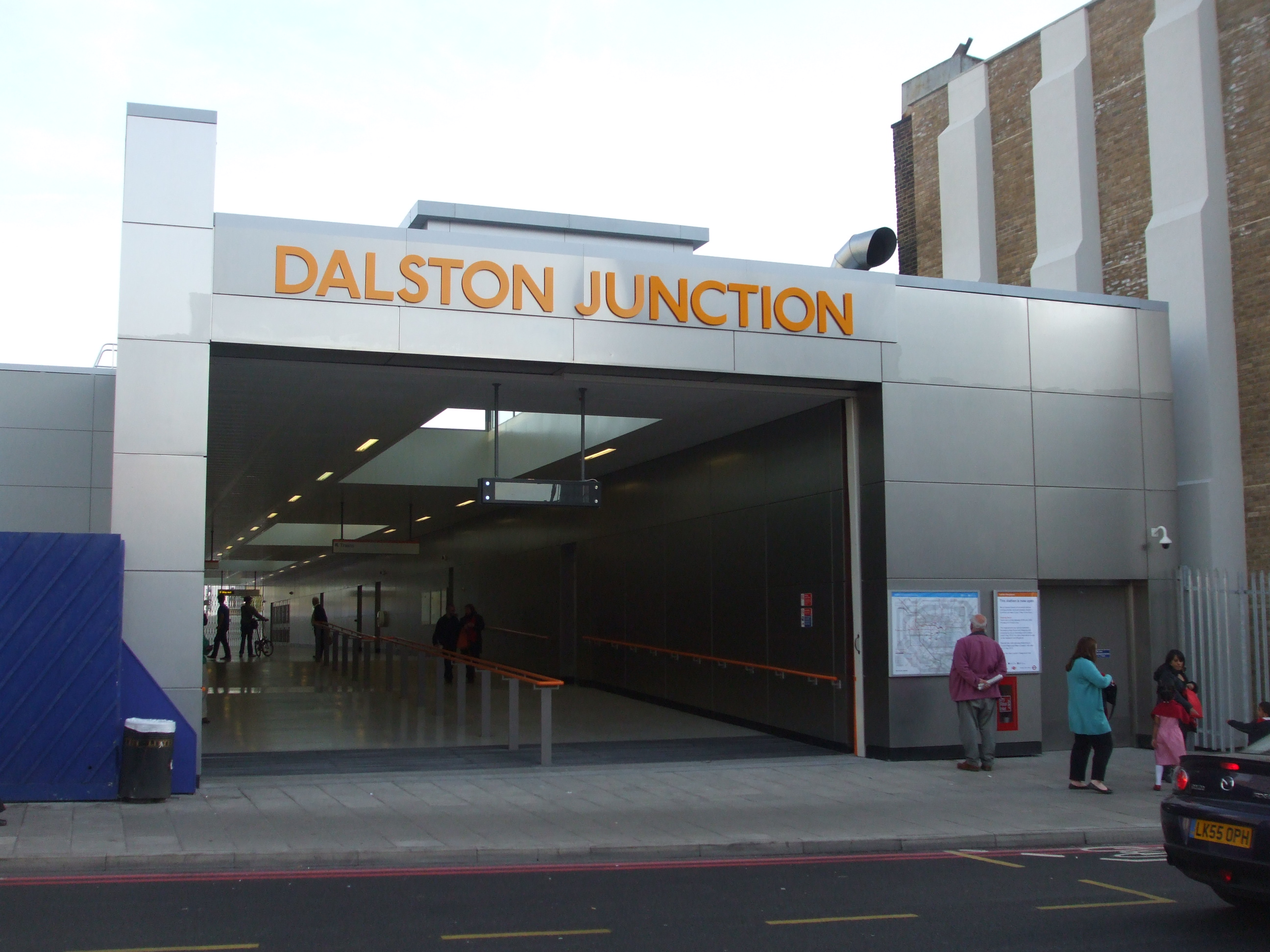
- North entrance on day of re-opening in April 2010
- Interactive map of Dalston Junction

General information
- Location: Dalston
- Local authority: London Borough of Hackney
- Managed by: London Overground
- Owner: Transport for London
- Station code: DLJ
- Number of platforms: 4
- Accessible: Yes
- Fare zone: 2
- OSI: Dalston Kingsland 3 or 4 mins walk away

National Rail annual entry and exit
- 2020–21: ▼1.447 million
- 2021–22: ▲3.506 million
- 2022–23: ▲5.032 million
- 2023–24: ▲5.788 million
- Interchange: 28,662
- 2024–25: ▼5.649 million
- Interchange: ▼17,981

Railway companies
- Original company: North London Railway
- Pre-grouping: London and North Western Railway
- Post-grouping: LMS

Key dates
- 1 November 1865: Opened
- 30 June 1986: Closed
- 27 April 2010: Reopened (as temporary ELL terminus)
- 28 February 2011: Fully reopened with through service to Highbury & Islington

Other information
- External links: Departures; Facilities
- Coordinates: 51.54539°N 0.07474°W

Dalston Junction is a station on the Windrush line of the London Overground, located in Dalston, London. Situated in London fare zone 2, the station is located in a short section of cut and cover tunnel north of the Kingsland Viaduct, at the crossroads of Dalston Lane, Kingsland Road and Balls Pond Road.

There is an official out-of-station interchange with Dalston Kingsland station on the Mildmay line of the Overground, located 250 metres (820 ft) walk away. Dalston Junction is an inter-modal rail and bus transport interchange, with numerous bus routes also serving the station.

== History ==
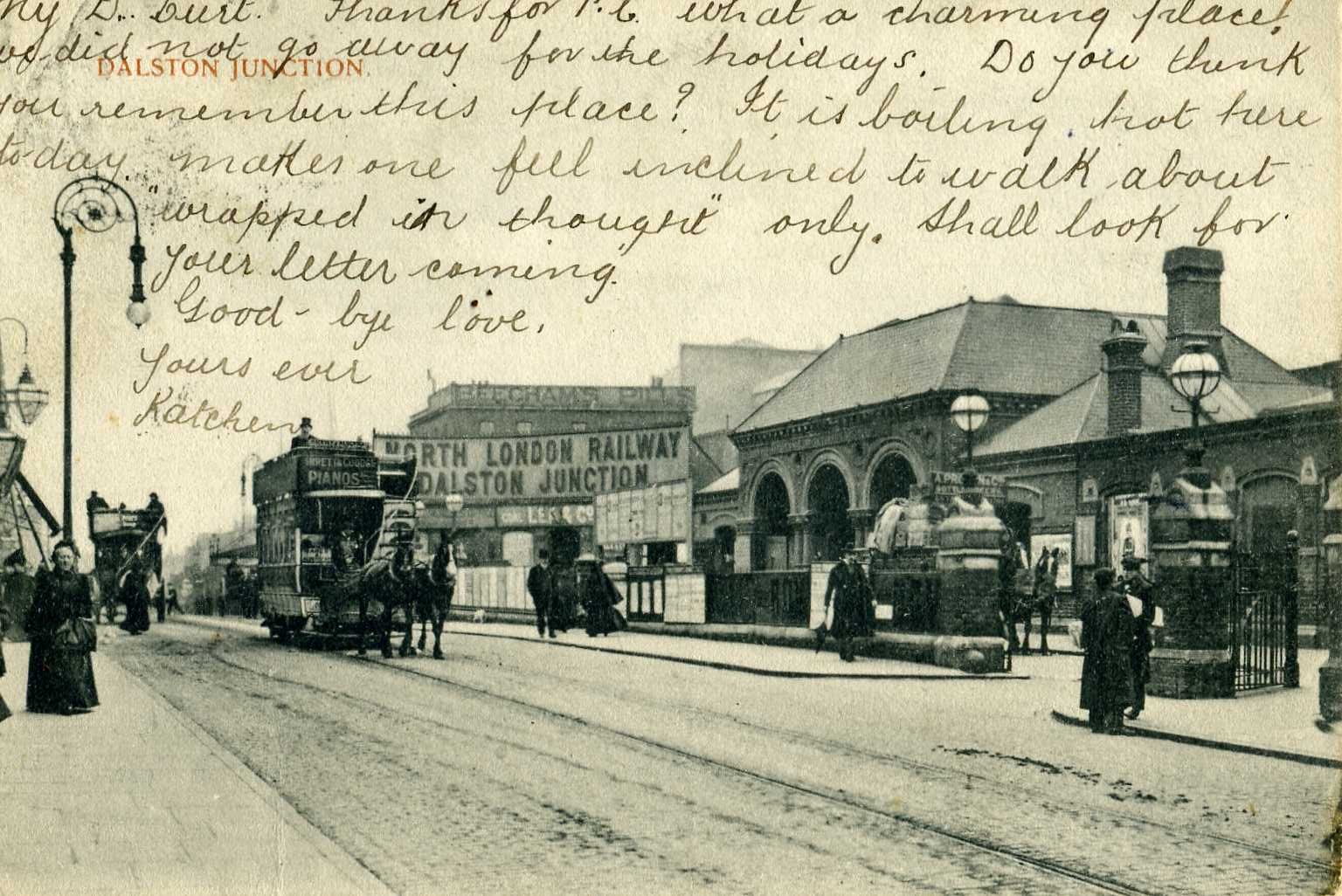
Dalston Junction, c. 1905 postcard

=== Before grouping (1867–1923) ===
When the East and West India Docks and Birmingham Junction Railway (known as the North London Railway (NLR) from 1853) started operating on 26 September 1850, they shared a London terminus at Fenchurch Street railway station with the London and Blackwall Railway which involved a circuitous route from north London via Hackney, Bow and East Stepney for city bound passengers. An act of parliament saw the NLR apply to build a two-mile extension from Dalston to a new London terminus at Broad Street. This was passed in 1861 and the majority of the line was built on a viaduct now known as the Dalston Viaduct. A significant number of properties were demolished to make way for the new railway.

At Dalston there was a junction at the west for trains towards Willesden, Richmond and Watford whilst to the east a junction was provided for trains towards Hackney, Bow and East India Road. The new Dalston Junction station was provided immediately north of the junction where the two spurs converged.

The original railway south of Dalston had three tracks but by 1874 a fourth track had been built to accommodate additional traffic. The station had six platform faces – two for the Poplar services and four for all westbound services – which were numbered from west to east. All the platforms had awnings and structures such as waiting rooms and offices but there was no overall roof.

When the station was opened all services that had been routed via Dalston Kingsland railway station were diverted to Broad Street and Dalston Kingsland closed. These services had previously continued onto Fenchurch Street via Hackney and Bow and were replaced by the Broad Street to Poplar East India Road service via the eastern platforms at Dalston. Between 1870 and 1890 they were extended to the Great Eastern Railway station at Blackwall.

On 27 October 1899 Louise Massett murdered her baby son in the station lavatories and became the first person executed in the UK in the 20th century. In 1916 the two westerly lines were electrified for Broad Street to Richmond services and the two sets of running lines became known as No. 2 Electrics (west side of viaduct) and No 1 Steam (east side of the viaduct).

==== Dalston LNW Goods Yard ====
The LNWR operated a goods yard that was accessed from Eastern Junction and lay between the eastern and northern curves.

The site is currently occupied by Kingsland shopping centre and car park.

=== London Midland & Scottish Railway (1923–1947) ===
Following the Railways Act 1921, also known as the grouping act, operation of the station fell under the control of the London Midland & Scottish Railway.

Sunday services to Poplar were withdrawn on 29 January 1940.

Through trains to Kew Bridge were withdrawn in September 1939.

Poplar services were withdrawn on 15 May 1944 although a bus replacement service lingered on until 23 April 1945. This was the end of passenger services to the eastern platforms although goods traffic continued to use them until closure of the Broad Street and Shoreditch goods depots.

=== Nationalisation (1948–1986) ===
After nationalisation on 1 January 1948 Dalston Junction was a British Railways London Midland Region railway station.

In 1956 some of the mechanical semaphore signals were replaced by colour light signals. This included some signals that were over 86 feet (26 m) high.

Some scenes from the 1959 film Look Back in Anger were filmed at the station and the film's launch party was held in the station buffet. The reference includes six stills from the film set at the station.

Whilst Euston was undergoing redevelopment in the early 1960s, a number of commuter trains were diverted via Dalston Junction to/from Broad Street.

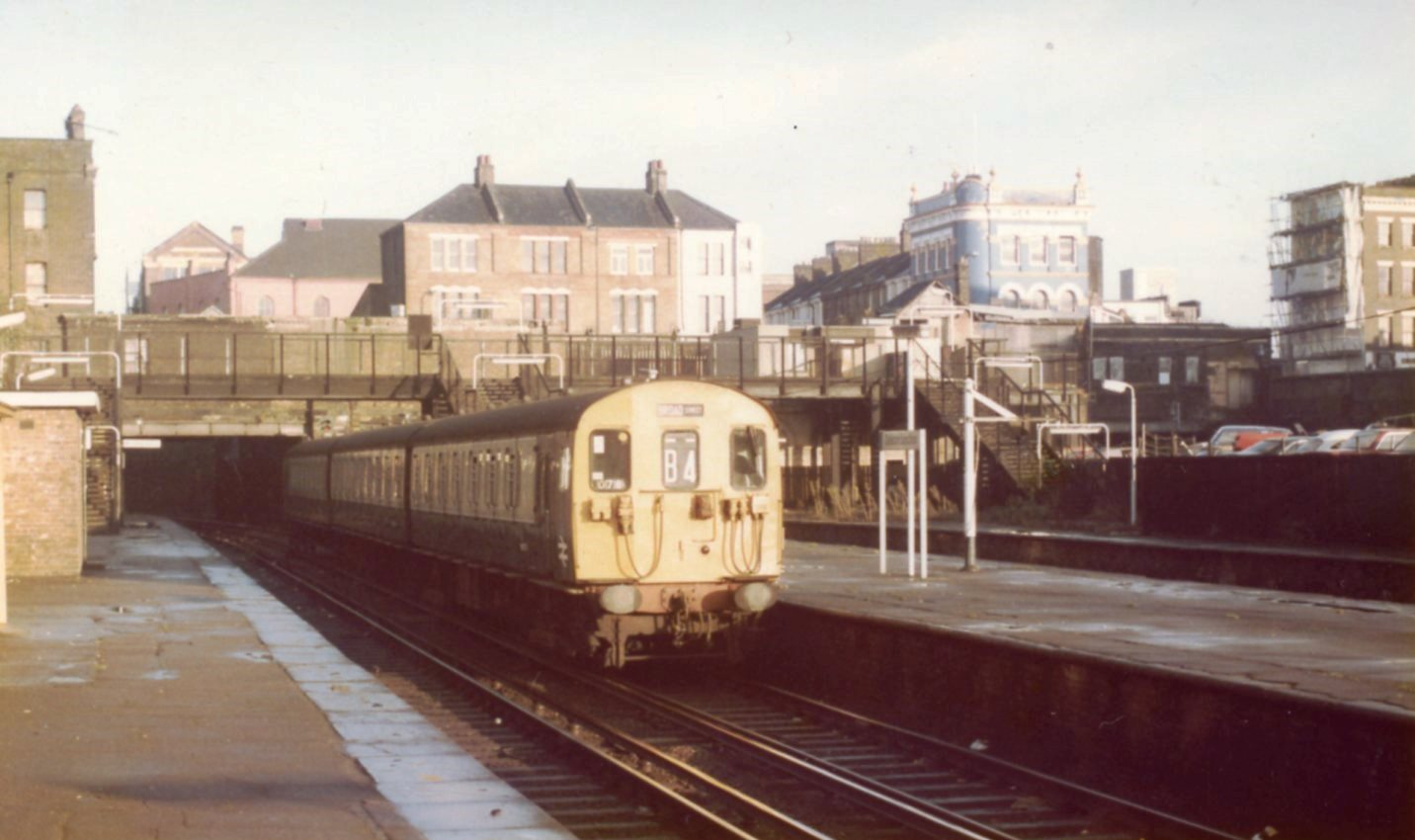
Dalston Junction in 1984, after many of the platform buildings had been cleared but before the first closure

The last goods trains to use platforms 5 and 6 ran on 1 March 1965 with official closure of the east curve following on 4 July 1966. The original street-level buildings were demolished in January 1970.

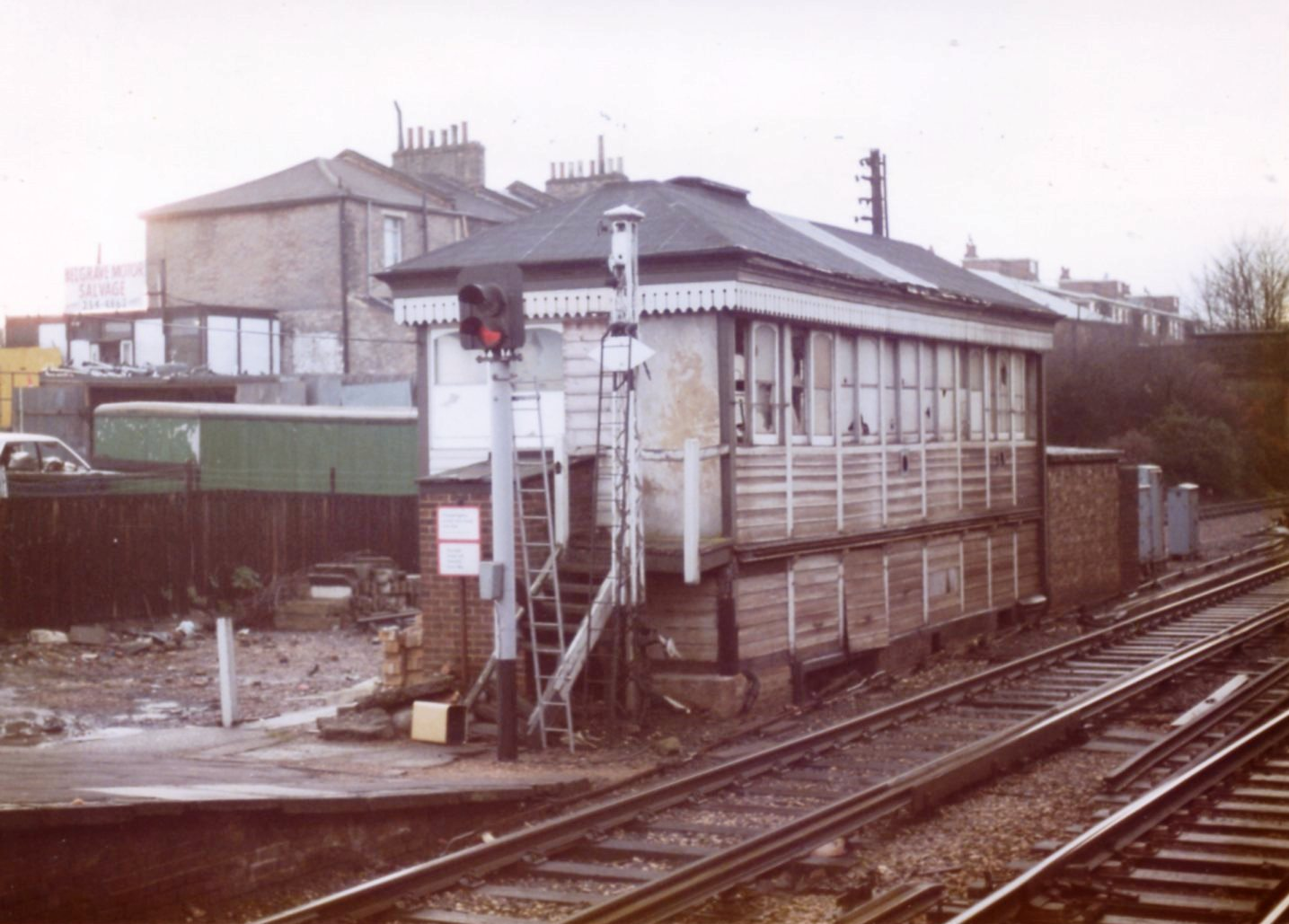
Dalston Junction signal box in 1984

South of Dalston the up No 1. Steam line was taken out of use on 2 January 1966 and the down on 5 November 1969 and were lifted sometime in the early 1970s. Four tracks continued through the station until 8 November 1976 when peak-hour Broad Street services to the former GN destinations such as Hertford North were withdrawn. This in turn led to the closure of the signal box on 25 February 1979. (Note: Services to the GN destinations were then served by the Northern City Line which started operating through trains from Moorgate in August 1976)

Dalston Kingsland railway station reopened on 15 May 1983 on the Crosstown Linkline service between North Woolwich and Camden Road.

Upon sectorisation in 1982 the London & South Eastern sector took over responsibility for operation of the station and shortly before closure on 10 June 1986 relaunched itself as Network South East. The traffic had been declining for many years at Broad Street and the British Railways Board had sold the land for a new property development. The Broad Street to Dalston West Junction section was closed on 30 June 1986 with the former No 2 electric lines being lifted soon after.

=== After closure (1986–2010) ===
After that the track bed through the western side of the station remained overgrown and unused until the East London line extension was opened in 2010.

A scrapyard occupied the site of eastern platforms for a period after closure. Later in 2010 a small community garden known as Dalston Eastern Curve Garden was established.

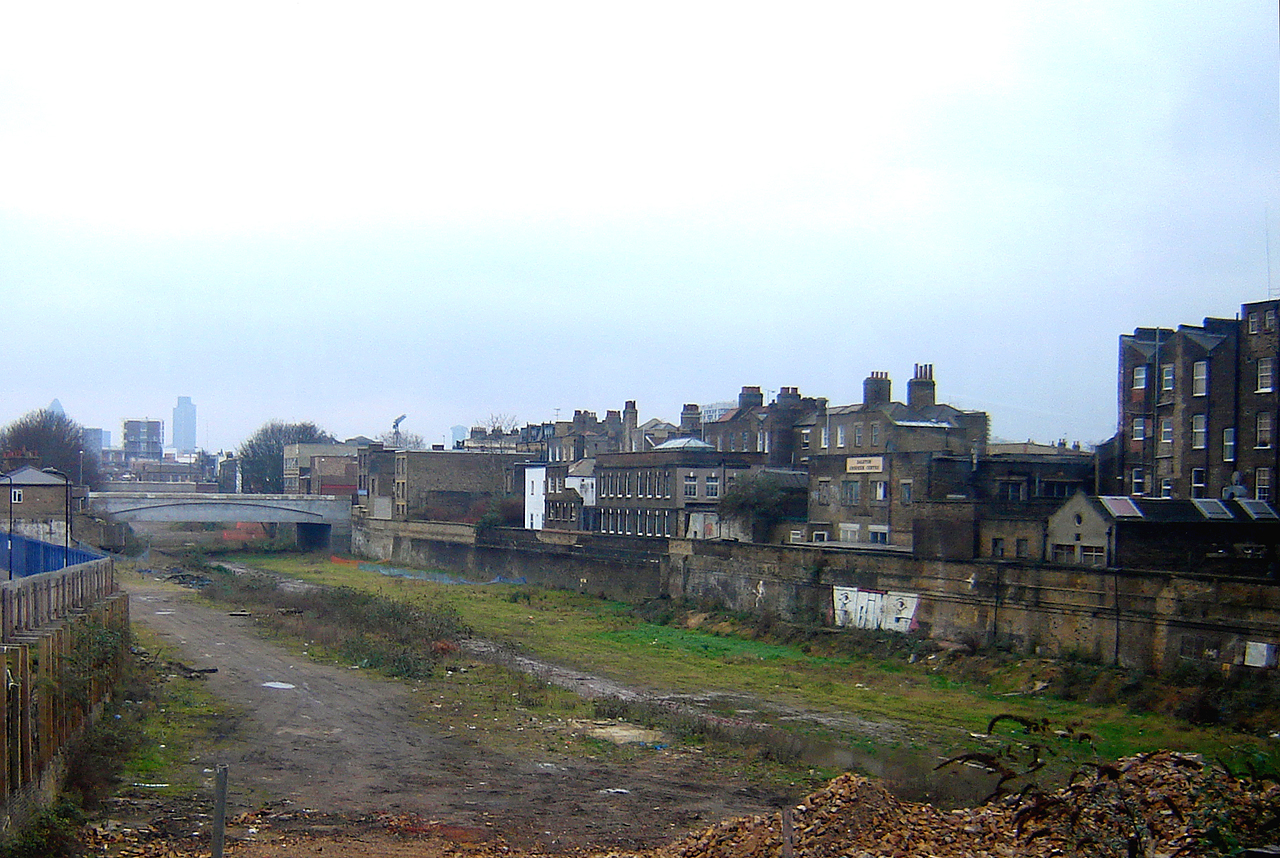
Levelled station site, 2006.

=== Re-opened station (2010 to present) ===
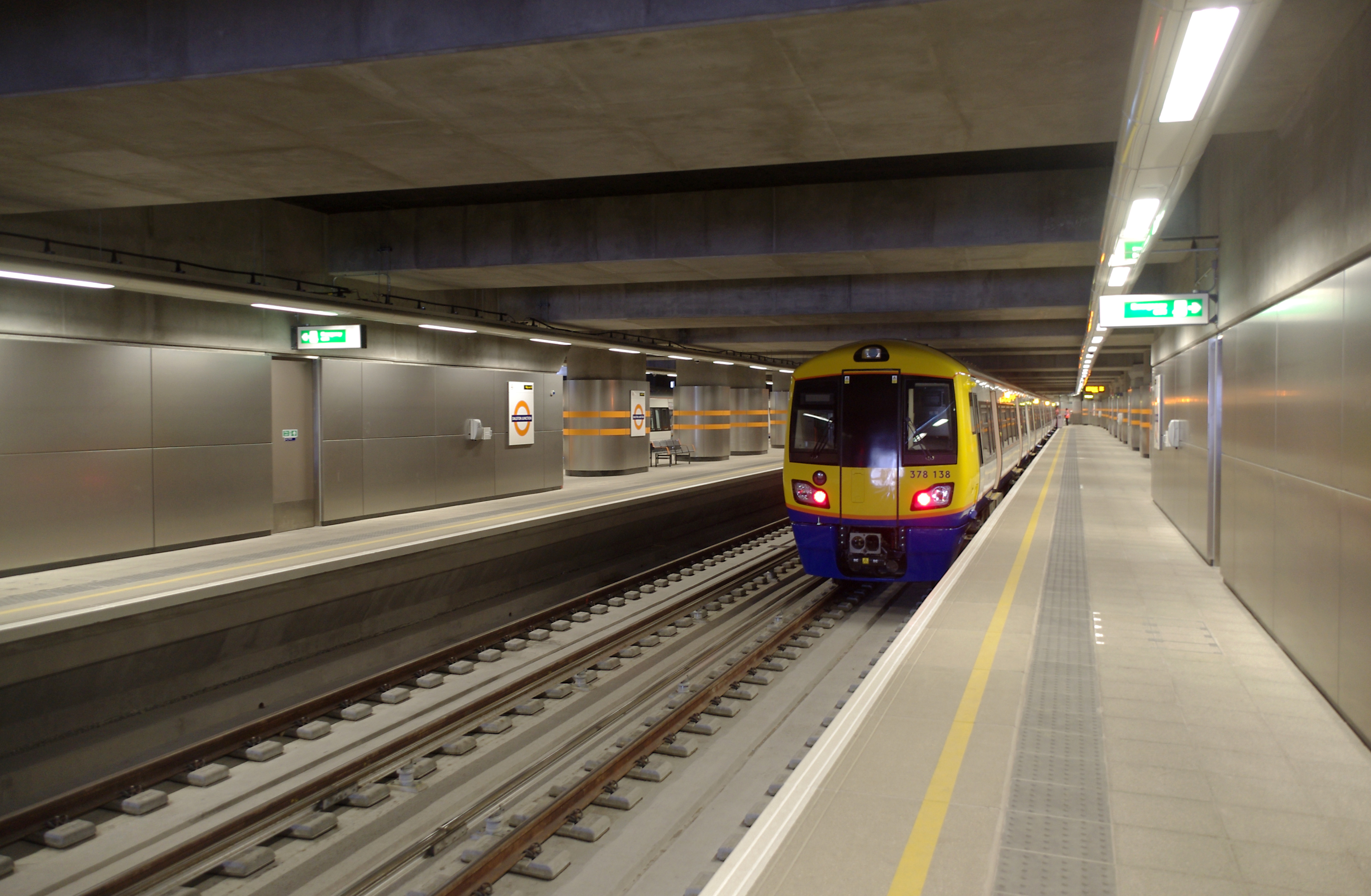
New platforms

Rebuilding the station for the London Overground network began with site clearance in early 2005. The station was opened by the Mayor of London, Boris Johnson, on 27 April 2010. A limited weekday "preview" service started that day with the first train leaving Dalston Junction at 12:05. The service was of eight trains per hour between Dalston Junction and Surrey Quays station from 07:00 to 20:00; four of the eight trains continued to New Cross Gate and four to New Cross.

The full service to West Croydon with branches to New Cross and Crystal Palace began on 23 May 2010, at hours similar to those of the London Underground. The service interval to each of the three southern terminals is approximately fifteen minutes for most of the day, though greater early mornings, late evenings, and parts of Sundays. The South London line was open to the public on 9 December 2012 and officially launched the next day by the Mayor, with the station now serving as the northern terminus to New Cross and West Croydon trains. Clapham Junction (via Surrey Quays) and Crystal Palace trains now start from Highbury & Islington. In the first phase of the extension of the East London line, Dalston Junction was the temporary northern terminus for all trains. From 28 February 2011 to 9 December 2012, trains from West Croydon and Crystal Palace continued beyond Dalston Junction, taking the relaid west curve north of the station to Highbury & Islington. As stated above, Dalston Junction still remains a terminal for New Cross trains, using the two bay platforms in the middle of the station. Transport for London and Hackney London Borough Council are currently developing the extensive station site with a bus interchange and high-rise towers above the new station.

== Description ==
=== Original station ===
The main entrance on Dalston Lane had three arches which took the passenger through to the ticket office. From there passengers would pass through the staffed ticket gates and turn left (for the Poplar platforms) or right (for the westbound) platforms. Broad Street passengers would no doubt have been directed to the next available train. A glass covered footbridge joined all six platforms at the north end. The station building was located on Dalston Lane and was set back from the street with a forecourt behind iron railings and gates.

There was a southerly entrance off Rosemary Place and a second footbridge linked the six platforms. Some carriage sidings were provided south and west of the station.

There was no overall roof with platforms having awnings and various buildings such as waiting rooms, staff offices and lavatories.

There were signal boxes at Dalston Eastern Junction, Dalston Western Junction and two immediately south of the station controlling each set of running lines. The Dalston Junction No 1 lines box was closed in 1909 and the number two lines box was extended (from 35 to 60 levers) and took over control of both running lines.

The original Dalston Western Junction box (opening date uncertain) which was known as Western Junction was replaced in 1891 by a North London Railway design signal box. This lasted until 2011 when it was closed and control passed to Upminster signalling centre.

=== New station ===
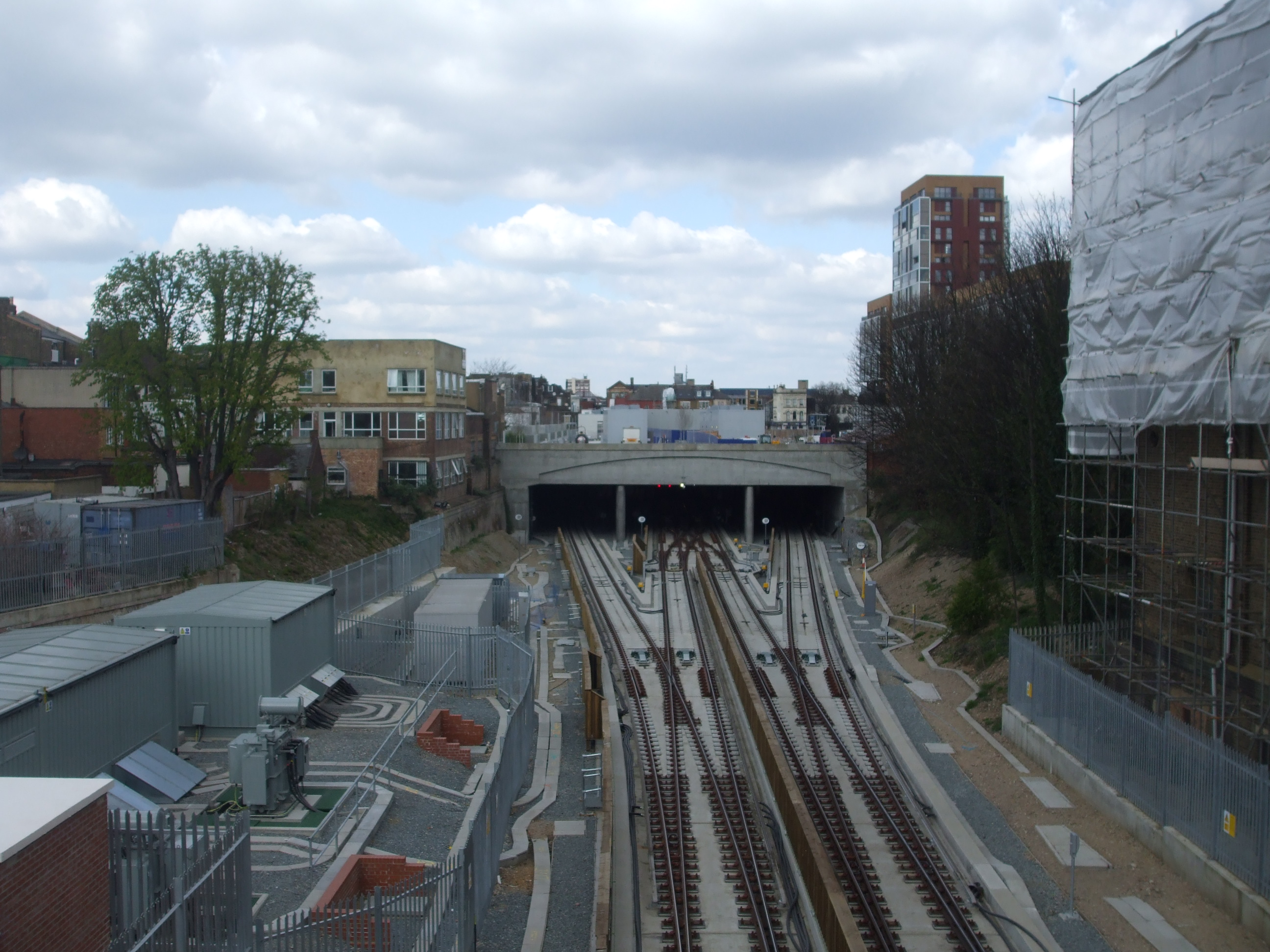
Track layout from south

The western of the two chords north of the station was reinstated on 28 February 2011 for East London line services to Highbury & Islington.

The new station has two island platforms, the outer sides of each providing through services, the inner bay faces supporting terminating services. Although the route eastward at the north end of the station has been protected it would require substantial reconstruction first and with the Crossrail 2 proposals it is highly unlikely that anything would be built here. The entire station is underneath a new building development.

== Services ==
=== July 1922 ===
The table below is a summary of the services from Bradshaw's July 1922 service guide which called at Dalston Junction. The working week at this time included Saturday mornings so there was a Saturday lunch time peak service. After the Saturday lunch time peak the off peak service would operate.

Generally, but not always, Poplar and GN services called at Shoreditch and Haggerston.

Services from Broad Street and Dalston Junction July 1922 Summary
To (Company) (Bradshaws Table No)	Weekday	Saturday	Sunday
Euston to the north (LNWR) (388)	Connecting services only shown but direct services did run from/to Wolverhampton between 1910 and 1914. Most main line services from Euston did stop at Willesden Junction (which then had mainline platforms) enabling connections from Broad Street and Dalston Junction	No direct service -change at Willesden Junction	No direct service -change at Willesden Junction
Edgware and High Barnet (GNR) (348)	Services to High Barnet or Alexandra Palace during the peaks – off peak service irregular	As per weekday off peak with some additional services for morning and lunch time peak	No service
Cuffley via Finsbury Park (GNR) (355)	Regular up (to Broad Street) morning peak services with irregular off-peak services (both directions and additional down services in the evening peak. Trains originated/terminated Cuffley, Enfield, Gordon Hill or Bowes Park.	As per weekday off peak with some additional services for morning and lunch time peak	No service
Richmond and Kew Bridge (LNWR/NLR)(422)	Off peak every 15 minutes to Richmond with a connecting shuttle from Acton to Kew Bridge/Peak every 30 minutes to Richmond (all stations) with a semi fast service to Kew Bridge every 30 minutes offering connections to LSWR Hounslow services.	As per weekday off peak with some additional services for morning and lunchtime peak	Every 30 minutes – all stations to Richmond
Poplar (LNWR/NLR) (426)	Every 15 minutes	Every 15 minutes in morning and lunchtime peak – otherwise every 30 minutes	Every 30 minutes
Watford & Tring (LNWR) (428)	Services ran by Chalk Farm and then via the main line to Tring or the Watford DC line to Watford Junction. More services operated during the peak hours.	As weekday with more trains in the morning and Saturday lunchtime peak hour.	No direct service – passengers had to change at Willesden Junction

=== June 1963 ===
There was a basic 20 minute repeating services calling all stations between Broad Street and Richmond. This was supplemented by a similar service to Watford Junction via Primrose Hill and the Watford DC line. By this time there were two services from Broad Street and Dalston Junction beyond Watford to Tring.

On Saturday the Watford service terminated at Willesden new station (now known as Willesden Low-Level) and it did not run on Sundays.

The Richmond service ran a 20-minute frequency on Saturday and 30 minutes on Sunday.

There were a number of weekday only morning and evening peak services running to the suburban lines out of Kings Cross which were routed via Canonbury and Finsbury Park and destinations included:

- New Barnet via Canonbury and Finsbury Park
- Hertford North via Canonbury, Finsbury Park and Hertford North
- Cuffley & Goffs Oak via Canonbury
- Gordon Hill via Canonbury

(Note: The user can select the relevant timetables from this page.)

At this time Richmond electric services were worked by the British Rail Class 501 which had been introduced in 1957 taking over from older LNWR Oerlikon EMU and worked through to 1985. The other services were diesel worked either by DMUs or diesel locomotives such as Class 31s and suburban compartment stock carriages.

=== London Overground (December 2012) ===
Rail services are provided on the Windrush line of the London Overground. As of 9 December 2012 Mondays to Saturdays there is a service every 5–10 minutes throughout the day, while on Sundays before 13:00 there is a service every 5–9 minutes, changing to every 7–8 minutes until the end of service after that. Current off peak frequency is:

- 4 tph Southbound to West Croydon
- 4 tph Southbound to Crystal Palace
- 4 tph Southbound to New Cross
- 4 tph Southbound to Clapham Junction
- 8 tph Northbound to Highbury & Islington
- 8 tph terminate here from Clapham Junction or New Cross

== Lines ==
Preceding station	London Overground	Following station
Canonbury towards Highbury & Islington	Windrush line East London line	Haggerston towards Clapham Junction, Battersea Park, Crystal Palace, New Cross or West Croydon
Terminus	Windrush line South London line	Haggerston towards Clapham Junction, Battersea Park, Crystal Palace, New Cross or West Croydon
Disused Railways
Hackney Central	North London Railway; Broad Street–Poplar	Haggerston
Mildmay Park	North London Railway; Broad Street–Richmond	Broad Street
Canonbury	British Rail; Eastern Region; North London Line (City Branch)	Broad Street

== Connections ==
London Buses routes 30, 38, 56, 67, 76, 149, 242, 243, 277, 488 and night routes N38, N242 and N277 serve the station.

== Future ==
A new Dalston station has been proposed on the Crossrail 2 route between Surrey and North London and Hertfordshire should it be built.
