= Bellenden Road Nature Garden =

UK nature reserve

Coordinates: 51.4725°N 0.0720°W

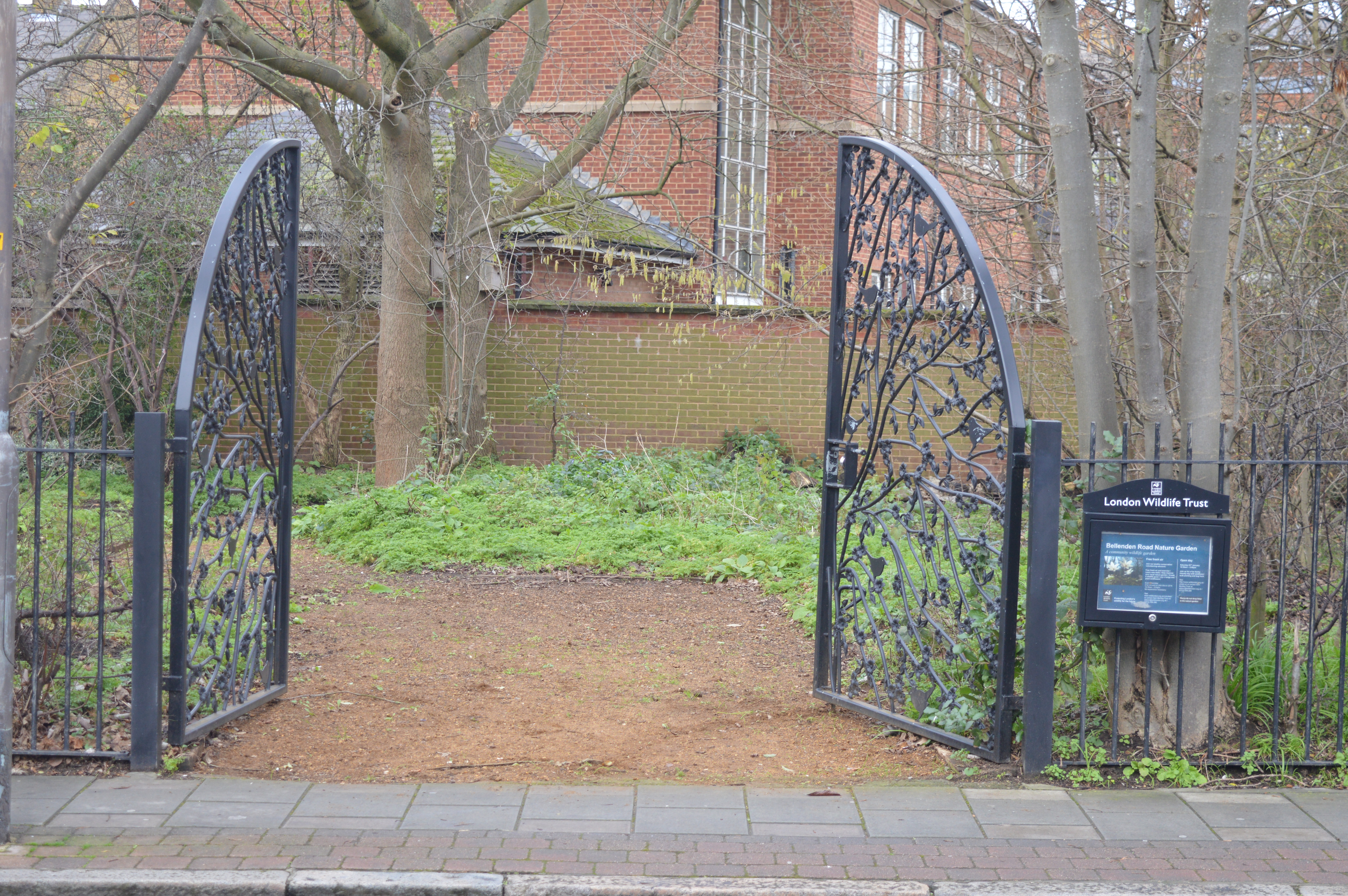

Bellenden Road Nature Garden is a very small nature reserve in Peckham in the London Borough of Southwark. It opened in August 2010.

The site was established to promote sustainable gardening and nature study for local schools and community groups. It contains a stag beetle loggery, wildflower borders, and a native hedgerow. Wildlife includes common toads, great tits, bees, and butterflies.
