= London Borough of Southwark =

- London borough
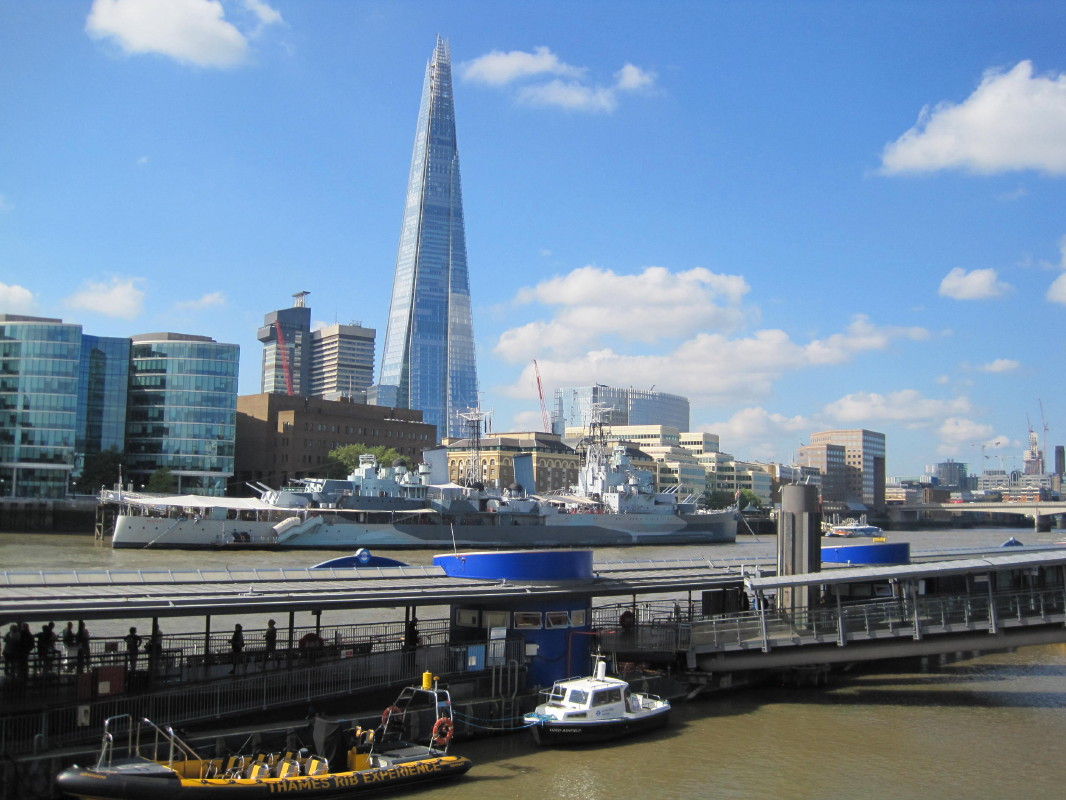
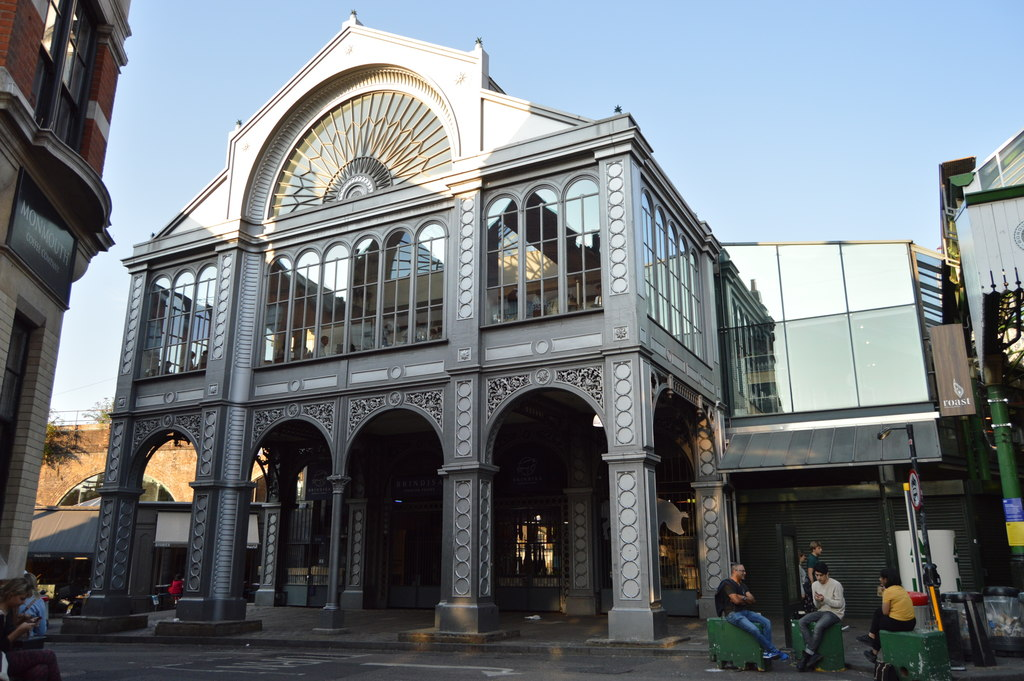
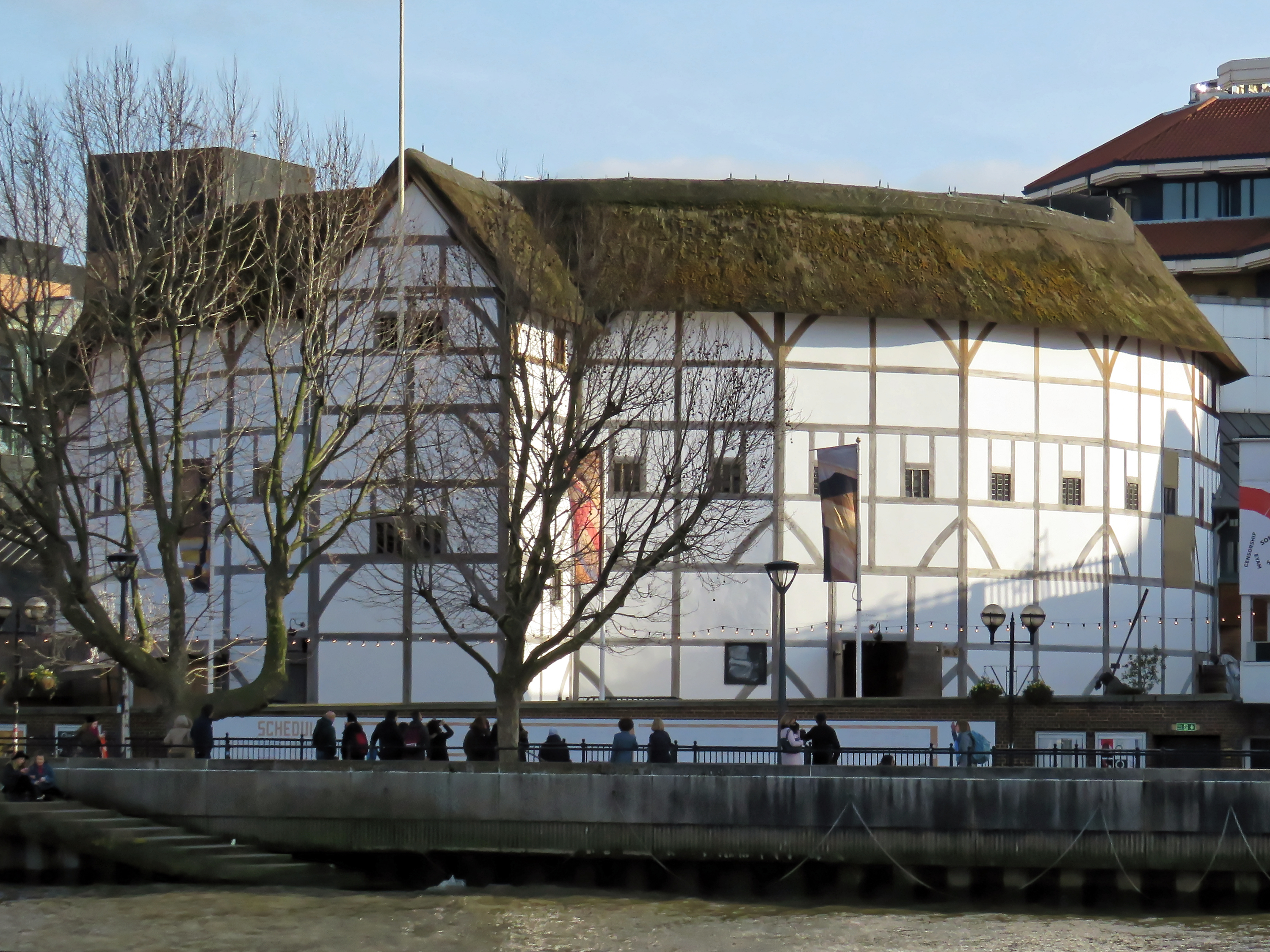
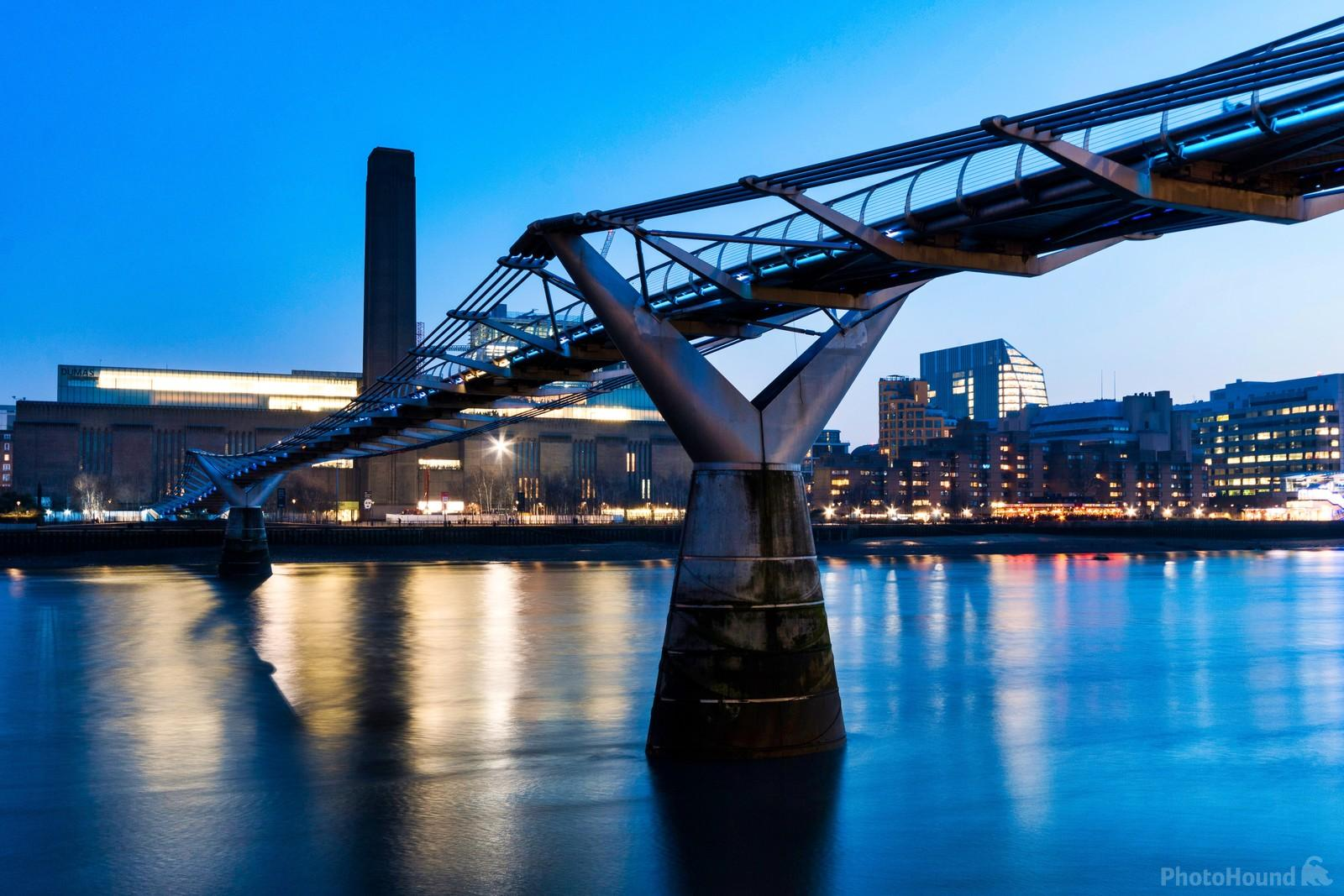
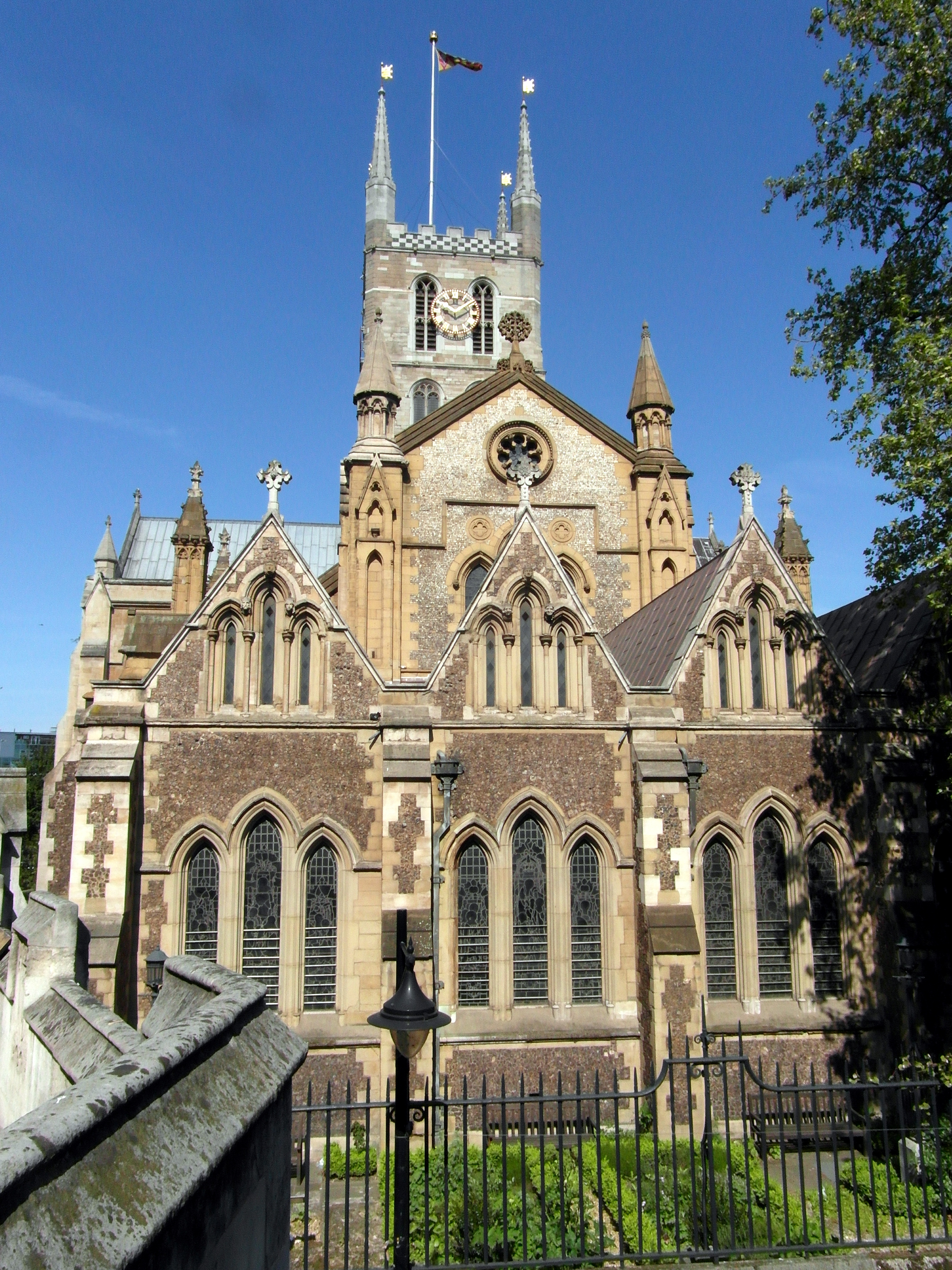
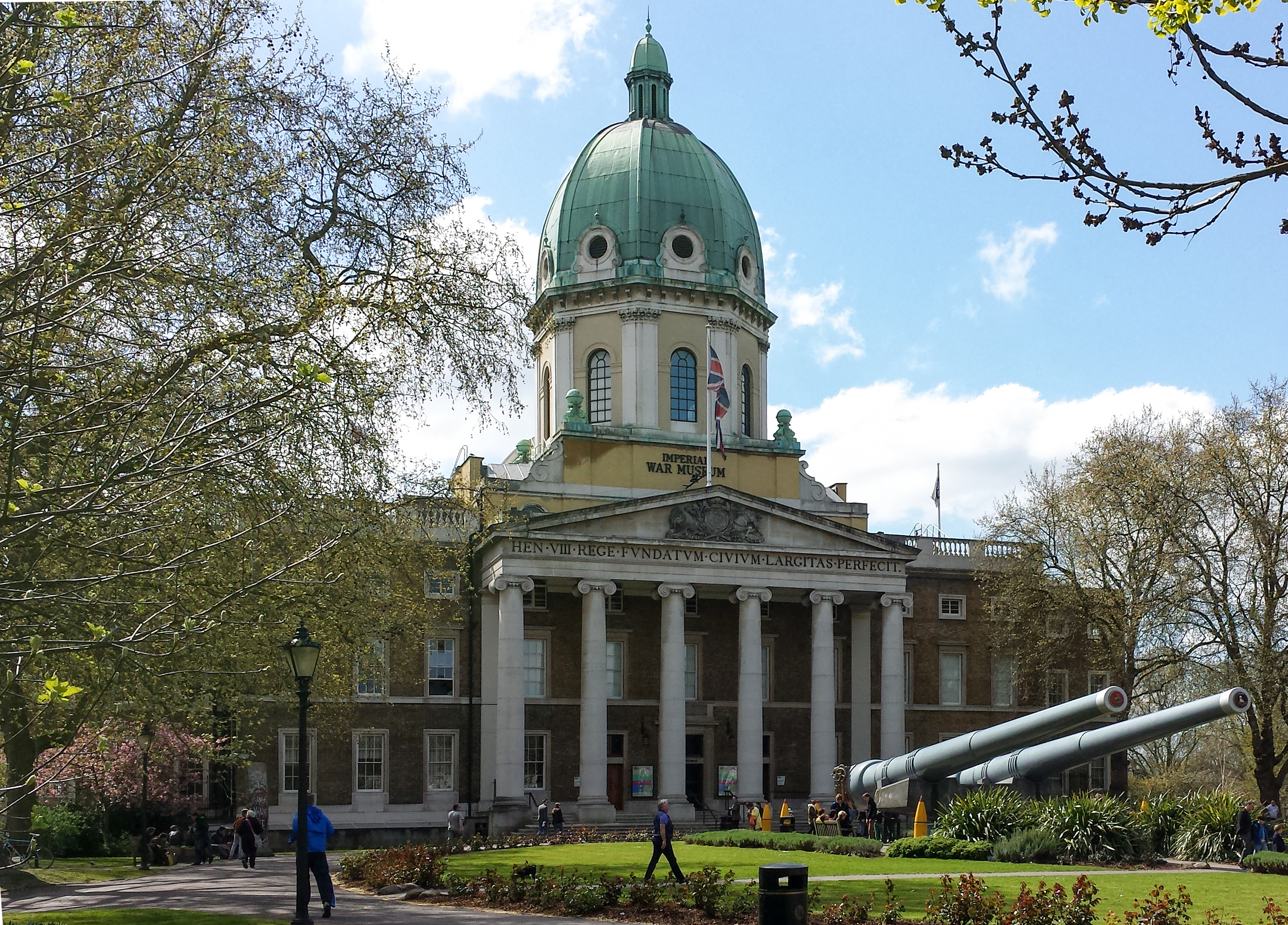
- From the top left; Top: The Shard and Borough Market; Middle: Globe Theatre, the Tate Modern and Millennium Bridge; Bottom: the Anglican cathedral and Imperial War Museum

- Coat of arms Council logo
- Motto: United to Serve
- Southwark shown within Greater London
- Coordinates: 51°28′N 0°05′W
- Sovereign state: United Kingdom
- Constituent country: England
- Region: London
- Ceremonial county: Greater London
- Created: 1 April 1965
- Admin HQ: Tooley Street, Southwark

Government
  - Type: London borough council
  - Body: Southwark London Borough Council
  - London Assembly: Marina Ahmad (Labour) AM for Lambeth and Southwark
  - MPs: 5 MPs: Neil Coyle (L); Florence Eshalomi (L); Miatta Fahnbulleh (L); Helen Hayes (L); Ellie Reeves (L)

Area
  - Total: 11.14 sq mi (28.85 km^{2})
  - Rank: 282nd (of 296)

Population (2025)
  - Total: 312,366
  - Rank: 47th (of 296)
  - Density: 28,040/sq mi (10,830/km^{2})
  - Ethnicity: 54.3% White; 6.2% Mixed; 9.5% Asian; 26.8% Black; 0.8% Arab; 2.4% Other
- Time zone: UTC (GMT)
  - Summer (DST): UTC+1 (BST)
- Postcodes: SE
- ISO 3166 code: GB-SWK
- ONS code: 00BE
- GSS code: E09000028
- Police: Metropolitan Police
- Website: http://www.southwark.gov.uk/

The London Borough of Southwark (/ˈsʌðərk/ SUDH-ərk) in South London forms part of Inner London and is connected by bridges across the River Thames to the City of London and the London Borough of Tower Hamlets. It was created in 1965 when three smaller council areas were amalgamated under the London Government Act 1963. All districts of the area are within the London postal district. It is governed by Southwark London Borough Council.

The part of the South Bank within the borough is home to London Bridge terminus station and the attractions of The Shard, Tate Modern, Shakespeare's Globe and Borough Market that are the largest of the venues in Southwark to draw domestic and international tourism. Dulwich is home to the Dulwich Picture Gallery and the Imperial War Museum is in Elephant and Castle. Major districts include Bermondsey, Rotherhithe, Peckham, Camberwell, and Dulwich.

== Toponymy ==
The name Suthriganaweorc or Suthringa geweorche is recorded for the place in the early 10th-century Anglo-Saxon document known as the Burghal Hidage and means "Surrey folk's fort" or "the defensive work of the men of Surrey". Southwark is recorded in the 1086 Domesday Book as Sudweca. The name means "southern defensive work" and is formed from the Old English sūþ (south) and weorc (work). In Old English, Surrey means "southern district (or the men of the southern district)", so the change from "southern district work" to the latter "southern work" may be an evolution based on the elision of the single syllable ge element, meaning district.

The strategic context of the defences would have been in relation to London, its bridge and preventing waterborne attackers from travelling further up the Thames.

== History ==
Southwark is the oldest part of south London. An urban area to the south of the bridge was first developed in the Roman period, but subsequently abandoned. The name Southwark dates from the establishment of a defensive position in the area by King Alfred in the 9th century.

Southwark was an ancient borough, being described as a borough from at least the 12th century. The area historically formed part of the county of Surrey. Southwark had a complicated administrative relationship with the neighbouring City of London. There was a parliamentary borough (constituency) of Southwark from 1295 onwards. London was given various manorial and judicial rights over parts of Southwark, notably in 1327 and 1550, when Southwark was brought within the city boundaries as the ward of Bridge Without. However, the city's authority over Southwark was not as complete as it was for the older part of the city north of the Thames; certain judicial powers over the borough were still exercised by the Surrey authorities.

From 1856 the area was also governed by the Metropolitan Board of Works, which was established to provide services across the metropolis of London. In 1889 the Metropolitan Board of Works' area was made the County of London. From 1856 until 1900 the lower tier of local government within the metropolis comprised various parish vestries and district boards. The parishes of Bermondsey, Camberwell, Newington, Rotherhithe and Southwark St George the Martyr were governed by their individual vestries, whilst other smaller parishes and liberties were grouped into the St Olave District and St Saviour's District.

In 1900 the lower tier was reorganised into metropolitan boroughs. Bermondsey, Rotherhithe and the St Olave District merged to become the Metropolitan Borough of Bermondsey, the parish of Camberwell was made the Metropolitan Borough of Camberwell, and Newington, Southwark St George the Martyr, and the St Saviour's District merged to become the Metropolitan Borough of Southwark. The City of London's Bridge Without ward which had covered parts of Southwark was effectively abolished as part of the reforms, losing all its territory.

The larger London Borough of Southwark was created in 1965 under the London Government Act 1963, covering the combined area of the former metropolitan boroughs of Southwark, Bermondsey and Camberwell.

== Geography ==
The borough borders the City of London and the London Borough of Tower Hamlets to the north (the River Thames forming the boundary), the London Borough of Lambeth to the west and the London Borough of Lewisham to the east. To the south the borough tapers giving a brief border with the London Borough of Bromley.

The northwest part of the borough is part of Central London and is densely developed. To the east, the Rotherhithe peninsula has lower-density modern housing and open space around the former Surrey Commercial Docks. The southern part of Southwark includes the Victorian suburbs of Camberwell, Peckham and Nunhead, and the prosperous "village" of Dulwich with some very large houses forms the far south of the borough.

=== Landmarks ===
Tower Bridge, the Millennium Bridge, Blackfriars Bridge, Southwark Bridge and London Bridge all connect the City of London to the borough. The Tate Modern art gallery, Shakespeare's Globe Theatre, the Imperial War Museum and Borough Market are also within the borough. At one mile (1.6 km) wide, Burgess Park is Southwark's largest green space.

=== Hills and watercourses ===
The Norwood Ridge, save for around its broad northern third, forms the borough's boundary. Along these crests, against the extreme of the borough's southern narrow taper, is the highest point of the borough, Sydenham Hill. This is the fifteenth-highest peak in London.

The main watercourse is the Thames bounding the north of the borough into which the area drains.

The southern 2/3 of the borough is the valley catchment of a present sewerage and surface water drainage basin, once a large stream with complex mouths across the north of the borough, the Effra. It is in very large part converted to a combined sewer under a Joseph Bazalgette-engineered reform to enable general urbanisation; all combined and public foul sewers drain far to the east – to the Crossness works.

Similarly reformed, into all three types of drainage (foul, combined, surface), are the Neckinger and Peck catchments of the borough.

== Governance ==
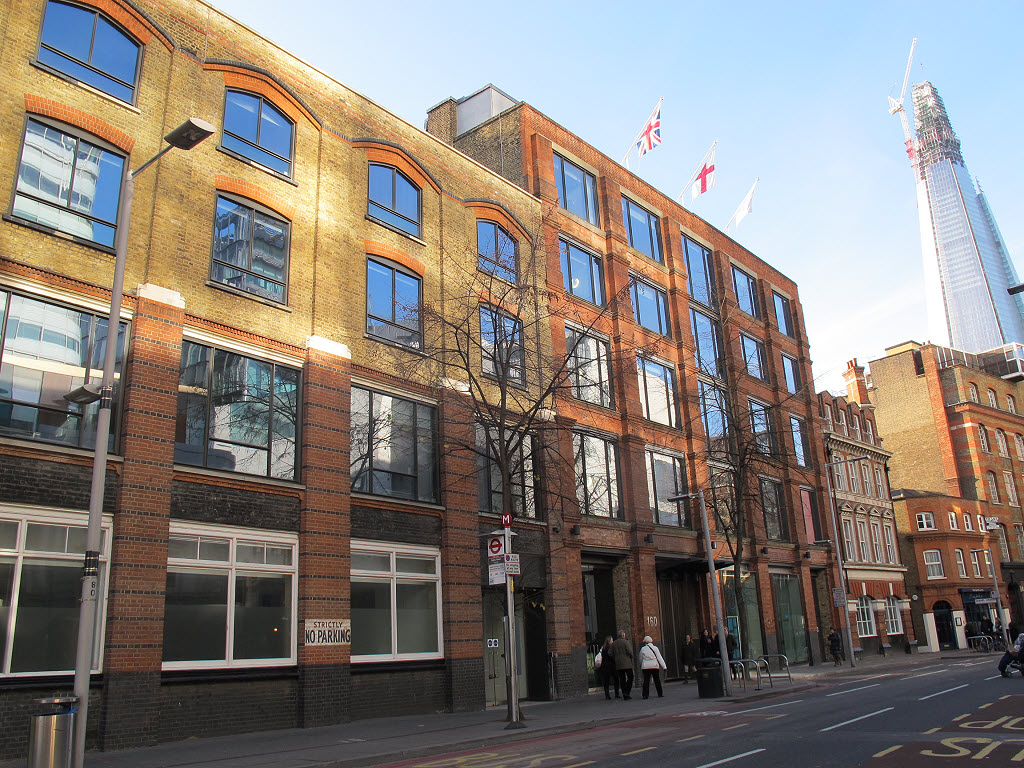
160 Tooley Street, the headquarters of the London Borough of Southwark

The local authority is Southwark Council, based at 160 Tooley Street.

As of the 2026 election the council is currently under No overall control

=== Greater London representation ===
Since 2000, for elections to the London Assembly, the borough forms part of the Lambeth and Southwark constituency.

=== Westminster Parliament ===
Following the completion of the 2023 Periodic Review of Westminster constituencies, the borough has been covered by five parliamentary constituencies since the 2024 general election, three of which extend into neighbouring boroughs. In the 2024 election, all five elected MPs were Labour Party candidates.

- Bermondsey and Old Southwark – Neil Coyle
- Dulwich and West Norwood (shared with London Borough of Lambeth) – Helen Hayes
- Lewisham West and East Dulwich (shared with London Borough of Lewisham) – Ellie Reeves
- Peckham – Miatta Fahnbulleh
- Vauxhall and Camberwell Green (shared with London Borough of Lambeth) – Florence Eshalomi

== Demographics ==
Population pyramid of the Borough of Southwark

Population census
Year	Pop.	±%
1801	114,901	—
1811	138,644	+20.7%
1821	172,699	+24.6%
1831	204,734	+18.5%
1841	146,922	−28.2%
1851	167,045	+13.7%
1861	283,723	+69.8%
1871	400,401	+41.1%
1881	517,080	+29.1%
1891	576,786	+11.5%
1901	578,059	+0.2%
1911	579,338	+0.2%
1921	556,520	−3.9%
1931	534,615	−3.9%
1941	425,088	−20.5%
1951	338,003	−20.5%
1961	297,132	−12.1%
1971	261,203	−12.1%
1981	209,724	−19.7%
1991	227,060	+8.3%
2001	244,867	+7.8%
2011	288,283	+17.7%
2021	307,640	+6.7%
2024 estimate	314,786	+2.3%
Note: 2024 estimate

At the 2001 census Southwark had a population of 244,866. Southwark was ethnically 63.04% white, 5.9% Asian or Asian British, and 25.9% black or black British. By 2021 the population was 307,640, with 51.5% white, 9.9% Asian or Asian British, and 25.1% black or black British. 31% of householders were owner–occupiers.

The area is the home of many Nigerian (Peckham is largely regarded as the heart of London's Nigerian community), Jamaican, South African, South American, Polish, and French immigrants.

=== Ethnicity ===
Ethnic Group	Year													
Ethnic Group	1966 estimations		1971 estimations		1981 estimations		1991 census		2001 census		2011 census		2021 census	
Ethnic Group	Number	%	Number	%	Number	%	Number	%	Number	%	Number	%	Number	%
White: Total	–	96.3%	–	91.2%	181,995	82.9%	170,847	75.2%	154,316	63.04%	156,349	54.09%	158,220	51.5%
White: British	–	–	–	–	–	–	–	–	127,752	52.2%	114,534	39.7%	109,253	35.5%
White: Irish	–	4%	–	–	–	–	–	–	7,674	3.1%	6,222	2.1%	6,024	2.0%
White: Gypsy or Irish Traveller	–	–	–	–	–	–	–	–	–	–	263	0.09%	156	0.1%
White: Roma	–	–	–	–	–	–	–	–	–	–	–	–	1,579	0.5%
White: Other	–	–	–	–	–	–	–	–	18,890	7.7%	35,330	12.2%	41,208	13.4%
Asian or Asian British: Total	–	0.4%	–	–	6,343	2.9%	11,418	5%	14,443	5.9%	27,574	9.3%	30,540	9.9%
Asian or Asian British: Indian	–	–	–	–	1,919		2,736		3,655	1.5%	5,819	2.1%	6,145	2.0%
Asian or Asian British: Pakistani	–	–	–	–	620		814		1,118	0.5%	1,623	0.5%	2,006	0.7%
Asian or Asian British: Bangladeshi	–	–	–	–	1,208		2,284		3,642	1.5%	3,912	1.3%	5,547	1.8%
Asian or Asian British: Chinese	–	–	–	–	1,433		2,914		4,492	1.8%	8,074	2.8%	8,405	2.7%
Asian or Asian British: Other Asian	–	–	–	–	1,163		2,670		1,536	0.6%	7,764	2.6%	8,437	2.7%
Black or Black British: Total	–	3.3%	–	–	28,590	13%	41,089	18.1%	63,416	25.9%	77,511	26.8%	77,299	25.1%
Black or Black British: African	–	0.4%	–	–	8,289	3.8%	16,783	7.4%	39,349	16.1%	47,413	16.4%	48,320	15.7%
Black or Black British: Caribbean	–	2.9%	–	–	16,257	7.4%	19,145	8.4%	19,555	8.0%	17,974	6.2%	18,156	5.9%
Black or Black British: Other Black	–	–	–	–	4,044		5,161		4,512	1.8%	12,124	4.2%	10,823	3.5%
Mixed or British Mixed: Total	–	–	–	–	–	–	–	–	9,146	3.7%	17,778	5.94%	22,151	7.2%
Mixed: White and Black Caribbean	–	–	–	–	–	–	–	–	3,350	1.4%	5,677	1.9%	6,401	2.1%
Mixed: White and Black African	–	–	–	–	–	–	–	–	1,954	0.8%	3,687	1.2%	3,569	1.2%
Mixed: White and Asian	–	–	–	–	–	–	–	–	1,343	0.5%	3,003	1.4%	4,653	1.5%
Mixed: Other Mixed	–	–	–	–	–	–	–	–	2,499	1.0%	5,411	1.8%	7,528	2.4%
Other: Total	–	–	–	–	2,580		3,845		3,545	1.4%	9,453	3.2%	19,430	6.3%
Other: Arab	–	–	–	–	–	–	–	–	–	–	2,440	0.8%	3,123	1.0%
Other: Any other ethnic group	–	–	–	–	–	–	–	–	3,545	1.4%	7,013	2.1%	16,307	5.3%
Ethnic minority: Total	–	3.7%	–	8.8%	37,513	17.1%	56,353	24.8%	90,550	36.98%	131,934	45.91%	149,420	48.5%
Total	–	100%	–	100%	219,508	100%	227,200	100%	244,866	100.00%	288,283	100.00%	307,640	100%

Extract from London's relief map showing how relief, the Norwood Ridge covers the south of the Borough overspills with crests to all other three sides and is the main feature for many miles.

=== Religion ===
According to the last census, Southwark was at the time about 50% Christian. It has many notable places of Christian worship and ceremony: Anglican, Roman Catholic and other denominations. These include Charles Spurgeon's Metropolitan Tabernacle, Southwark Cathedral (Church of England), Saint George's Cathedral (Roman Catholic), and Saint Mary's Cathedral (Greek Orthodox). London's Norwegian Church, Finnish Church and the Swedish Seamen's Church are all in Rotherhithe. Saint George the Martyr is the oldest church in London dedicated to England's patron saint. Southwark has the most British-Nigerian churches in the country and the highest concentration of African churches outside the continent.

Places of worship for Sunni Muslims, Hindus, Sikhs and Jews exist.

Per the 2011 Census, 35.6% of the borough's resident respondents identified as non-religious, or chose not to state their faith.

Religion in Southwark (2021 census)
1. Christianity (43.3%)
2. No religion (36.4%)
3. Islam (9.60%)
4. Not stated (7.30%)
5. Hinduism (1.30%)
6. Buddhism (1.00%)
7. Other religions (0.70%)
8. Judaism (0.40%)
9. Sikhism (0.20%)

The following table shows the religious identity of residents residing in Southwark according to the 2001, 2011 and the 2021 censuses.

Religion	2001		2011		2021	
Religion	Number	%	Number	%	Number	%
Holds religious beliefs	175,313	71.6	186,574	66.7	173,427	56.3
Christian	150,781	61.6	151,562	52.6	133,298	43.3
Muslim	16,774	6.9	24,551	8.5	29,633	9.6
Jewish	1,011	0.4	1,006	0.3	1,243	0.4
Hindu	2,664	1.1	3,668	1.3	3,444	1.1
Sikh	578	0.2	653	0.2	632	0.2
Buddhist	2,621	1.1	3,884	1.3	2,965	1.0
Other religion	884	0.4	1,350	0.5	2,149	0.7
No religion	45,325	18.5	77,098	26.7	111,935	36.4
Religion not stated	24,228	9.9	24,611	8.6	22,338	7.3
Total population	244,866	100.0	288,283	100.0	307,700	100.0

=== Immigration ===
This list includes top-15 sources of immigration to Borough of Southwark for 2021 census:

#	Country	Number
1	Nigeria	11,173
2	Italy	5,939
3	Jamaica	4,553
4	Spain	4,520
5	Ghana	4,321
6	Sierra Leone	4,262
7	France	3,789
8	Ireland	3,642
9	United States	3,373
10	Colombia	3,371
11	China	3,352
12	India	3,003
13	Poland	2,837
14	Brazil	2,505
15	Ecuador	2,441

== Repurposed places of worship ==
Ex-St Thomas's Church is the Old Operating Theatre Museum and Herb Garret. The other redundant church in public use is Francis Bedford's in Trinity Church Square, as recording studio Henry Wood Hall.

== Literature and theatres ==
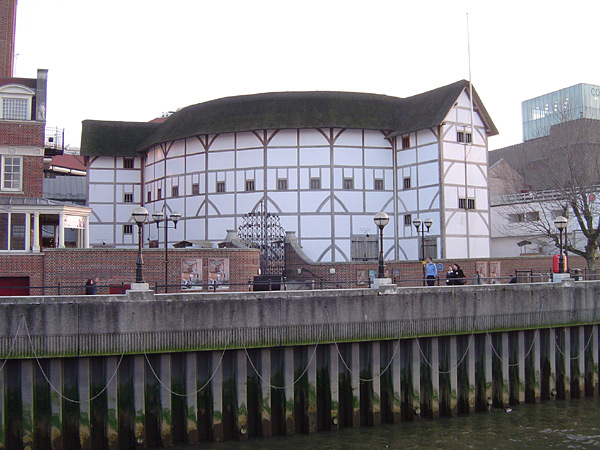
The rebuilt Globe Theatre

Southwark has many literary associations. Charles Dickens set several of his novels in the old borough where he lived as a young man. The site of The Tabard inn (featured in Chaucer's Canterbury Tales), the White Hart inn and the George Inn which survives.

The rebuilt Globe Theatre and its exhibition on the Bankside remind us of the area's being the birthplace of classical theatre. There is also the remains of the Rose Theatre. In 2007 the Unicorn Theatre for Children was opened on Tooley Street. The Southwark Playhouse is in Elephant and Castle and the Union Theatre is on Union Street near Southwark station. The Menier Chocolate Factory combines a theatre and exhibition space, whilst the newly opened Bridge Theatre is next to Tower Bridge and City Hall.

== Museums and galleries ==
The borough hosts the main site of the Imperial War Museum at the south end of Borough High Street.

Peckham Library, designed by Will Alsop won the Stirling Prize for modern architecture. Another architecturally innovative library designed by Piers Gough, Canada Water Library opened in 2011.

South London Gallery between Camberwell and Peckham is split across two buildings on Peckham Road. The Tate Modern is also based at Bankside. MOCA, London, as curated by the artist Michael Petry, and Flat Time House are both contemporary art galleries on Bellenden Road. Dulwich Picture Gallery also is in Dulwich. Bold Tendencies is an annual exhibition space in a former car park on Rye Lane in Peckham which has shown work by Simon Whybray, Jenny Holzer, Derek Jarman, Rene Matić, and Gray Wielebinski.

Another museum is the Old Operating Theatre.

One former museum include the Cuming Museum and the Livesey Museum for Children was a free children's museum housed in the former Camberwell Public Library No.1, which was given to the people of Southwark by the industrialist Sir George Livesey. The museum was closed by Southwark council in 2008.

== Economy ==
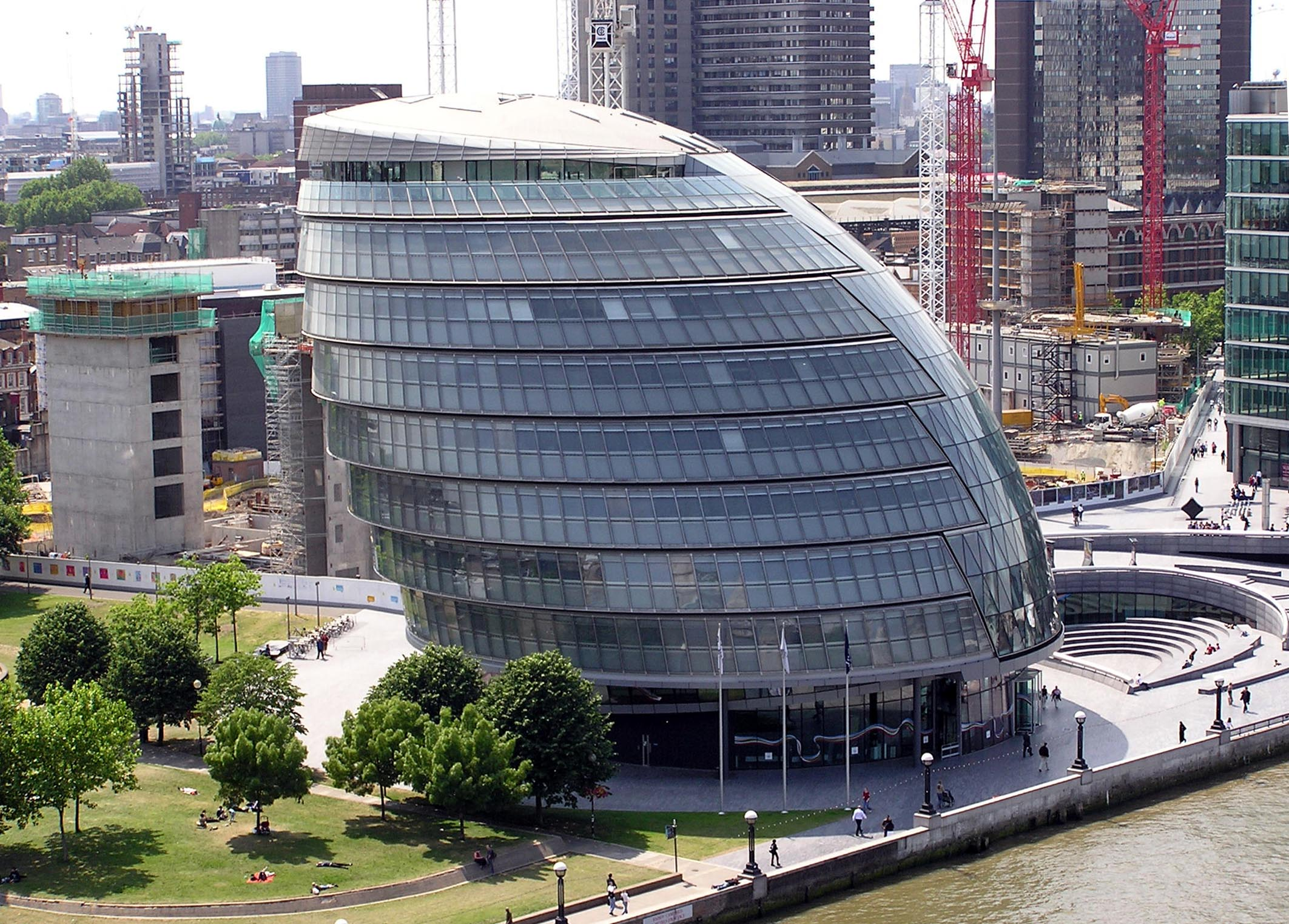
City Hall, taken from the high walkway on Tower Bridge

The northern end of the borough opposite the Square Mile includes the More London and London Bridge City developments accommodating the offices of major professional service firms. Notable such businesses include PricewaterhouseCoopers, Norton Rose, Ernst & Young, Lawrence Graham and Actis. The Greater London Authority is based at City Hall.

The press and publishing industry is also well represented in Southwark; the Financial Times has its head office in Southwark Bridge Road, and IPC Magazines in Southwark Street. Campus Living Villages UK also has its head office in the borough.

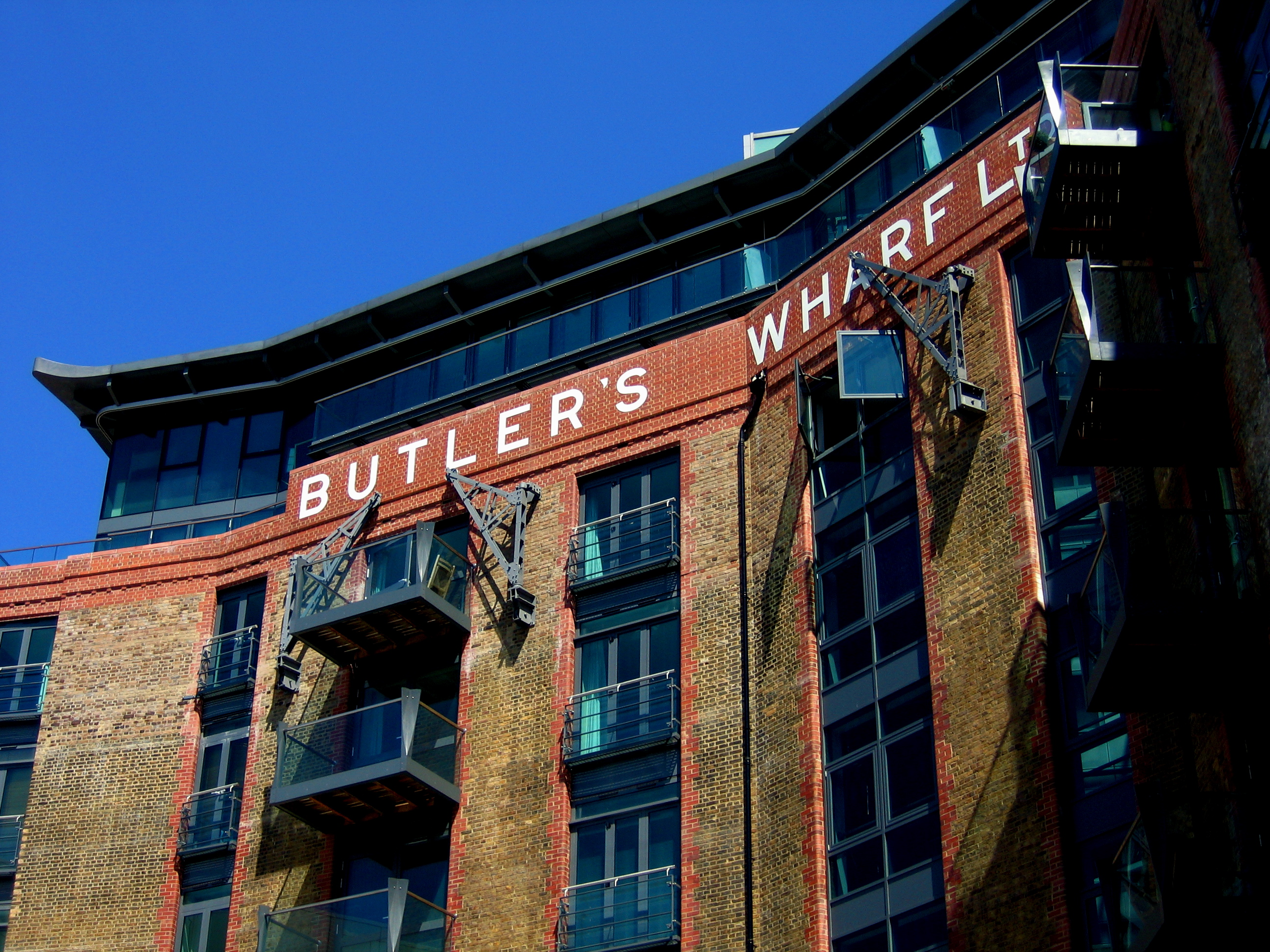
Tea Trade Wharf, Shad Thames

Some of the old industrial and wharfside heritage remains at the now-defunct Surrey Commercial Docks now Surrey Quays, including Greenland Dock and Baltic Quay, where major residential schemes were developed in the 1980s and 1990s. Near Tower Bridge, old warehouses have been converted to new mixed uses at Butler's Wharf and Hay's Wharf. Similarly, further west, the Oxo Tower hosts restaurants, shops and housing.

There are major retail concentrations at Surrey Quays, Old Kent Road, Elephant & Castle/Walworth Road and central Peckham.

Southwark is currently home to three Opportunity Areas (areas with capacity for significant economic development) as designated in the Mayor of London's London Plan. These are Elephant and Castle, Canada Water and Old Kent Road.

== Educational establishments ==
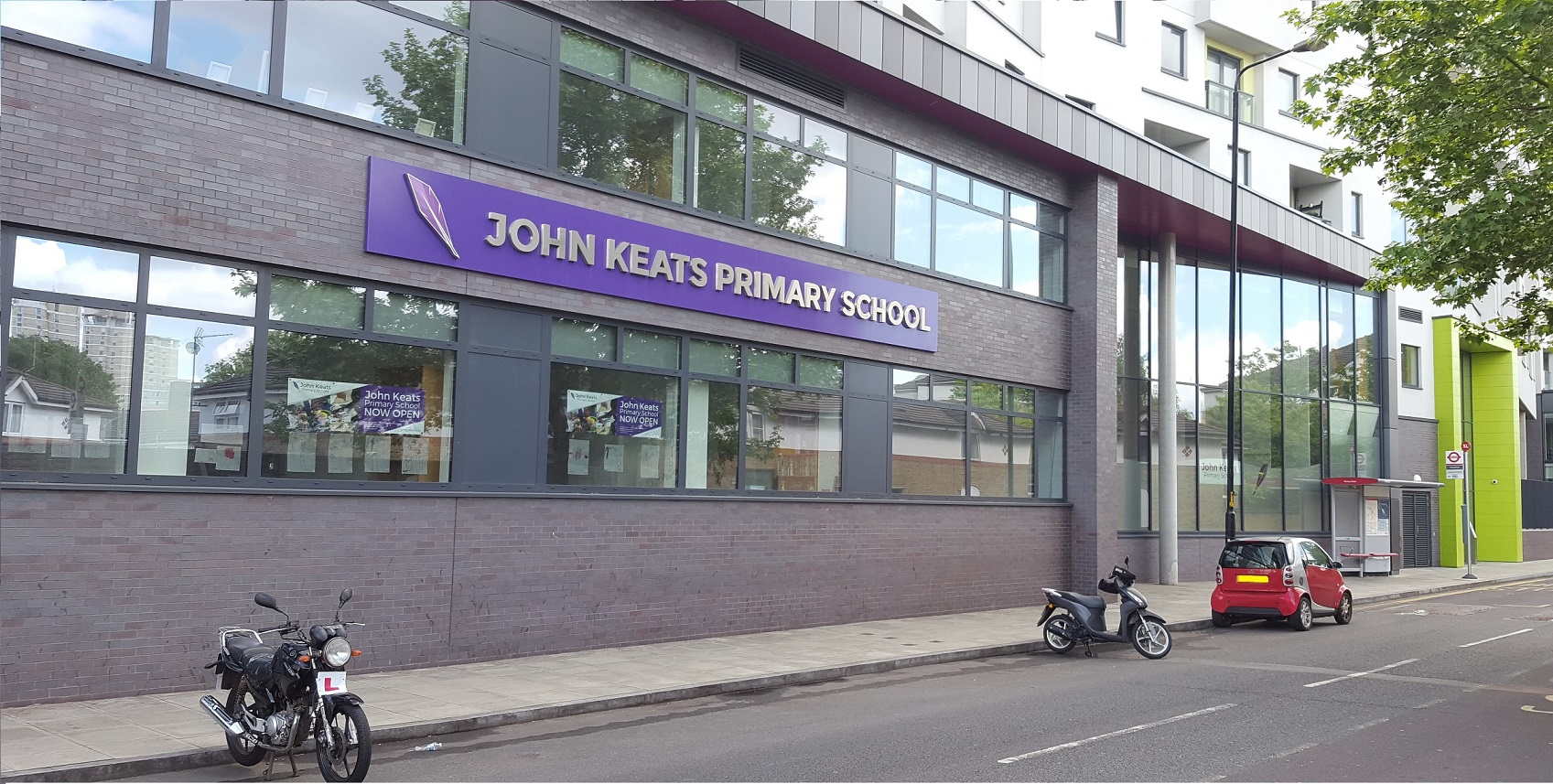
John Keats Primary School on Rotherhithe New Road opened in 2018.

London South Bank University (LSBU) has over 23,000 students and 1,700 staff at its principal Elephant and Castle site. The Chancellor is the entrepreneur newscaster Richard Farleigh.

The University of the Arts London has two of its colleges in the borough: the London College of Communication is at Elephant and Castle, and Camberwell College of Arts is on Peckham Road. Its Creative Computing Institute is also on Peckham Road.

The largest university teaching hospital in Europe, King's College London, is at the Guy's Hospital site, merging the teaching activities of the Guy's, St Thomas' and King's College Hospitals here. St Thomas' was founded in the mid-12th century in the borough and parts of it remain at St Thomas Street; Guy's was founded opposite this in 1725. The Salvation Army maintains the William Booth Memorial Training College at Denmark Hill.

Founded in 1945, Mountview Academy of Theatre Arts moved to Peckham in 2018.

== Housing ==
Southwark has a wide variety of housing, including council housing such as the post-Blitz Aylesbury Estate and the Heygate Estate to provide homes to low-income residents. The aforementioned estates have been turned over to local housing associations to demolish and redevelop as mixed-tenure developments. Southwark Council and the Greater London Authority have invested tens of millions of pounds in supporting the respective housing associations complete these projects, which in both cases will lead to a large increase in the number of properties on the sites, with an almost equal reduction in the amount of social housing: the Aylesbury Estate originally housed 2,403 properties at social rent while post-development there will be 1,323 for social rent and 1,733 for private sale; meanwhile the Heygate Estate had 1,214 properties before demolition, most of which were leased at social rent, while the final plans for the development will see 2,530 homes, of which 500 will be social housing.

Southwark's local residents' returns recorded in 2011 that its rented sector comprised 53.4% of its housing, marginally below the highest in England, which was recorded by Camden, at 53.5%. In neighbouring Lambeth this figure was 47.3% and in neighbouring Croydon the figure was 29.7%.

Southwark had the greatest proportion of social housing in England, 43.7% (31.2% owned by the council itself with the other social housing in the hands of housing associations), at the time of the 2011 census. Tenant management organisations benefit many apartment blocks. The council set much housing policy among Housing Association blocks to allocate homes based on need and a rent that residents can afford, based on means testing, via headlease and/or by the Housing List. In many blocks a mixture of social, shared-ownership and private sector housing exists, particularly in those where the right to buy has been exercised and in newer developments.

Ten highest-ranked local authorities by proportion of Social Housing-(2011 Census)
Local Authority	Socially rented	Privately rented	Shared Ownership
Southwark London Borough	43.7 (31.2)	23.6	2.0
Hackney London Borough	43.7 (23.8)	28.9	2.3
Islington London Borough	42.0 (26.7)	26.9	1.3
Lambeth London Borough	35.1 (19.6)	29.3	1.5
Royal Borough of Greenwich	34.3 (22.6)	19.8	1.6
Barking and Dagenham London Borough	33.7 (28.4)	17.7	1.3
Camden London Borough	33.1 (23.0)	32.3	0.7
South Tyneside Metropolitan District	32.6 (25.2)	9.0	0.4
Norwich Non-Metropolitan District	32.5 (26.2)	21.7	0.7
Harlow Non-Metropolitan District	31.2 (26.9)	10.8	0.9
Note: First figure is total social rented, the figure in parentheses is council-owned

== Courts and judiciary ==
The old Southwark borough hosted many Courts and Prisons of Royal Prerogative, the Marshalsea and King's Bench. As well as the manorial and borough courts, magistrates met until the 20th century at the Surrey Sessions House which had its own jail for the punitive aspect of its work. The Inner London Sessions House (or now Crown Court) on Newington Causeway descends from these. The Southwark Coroner's Court in Tennis Street dates back to the charter of 1550. In 1964 Southwark Crown Court was opened at English Grounds near London Bridge. Since 1994 the Crown Court for west London Boroughs, was rehoused from Knightsbridge to Southwark as Blackfriars Crown Court. When the decision was taken to separate the judiciary and legislature, in 2007, by transforming the House of Lords Judicial Committee of Law Lords into the Supreme Court took over the court occupying the Middlesex Guildhall, whose City of Westminster judges transferred to Southwark Crown Court, hence the senior judge holds the honorific title of the Recorder of Westminster. Southwark's local magistrates sit at two courts in the borough, Tower Bridge and Camberwell Green Magistrates Courts.

The concentration of major courts, which are unlawful to film save for sentencing with judicial permission, enables their media coverage: Southwark has seven jurisdictions, six of which are London's criminal courts and which commonly receive offences committed in public office or in businesses based in Westminster and several other London boroughs.

== Sport and leisure ==
The London Borough of Southwark has the following sport clubs:

- EFL Championship club Millwall F.C. who play at the New Den.
- Non-League football club Dulwich Hamlet F.C. who play at Champion Hill.
- Non-League football clubs Fisher F.C. & Bermondsey Town F.C. play at St Paul's Sports Ground, Rotherhithe.
- Independent Football Academy, Ballers Academy who train and play at St Paul's Sports Ground and The Docklands Settlement in Rotherhithe & Harris Academy in Bermondsey.

== Transport ==
=== Bridges and tunnels ===
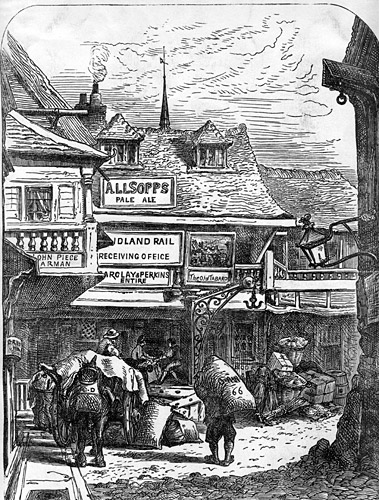
The Tabard Inn, around 1850

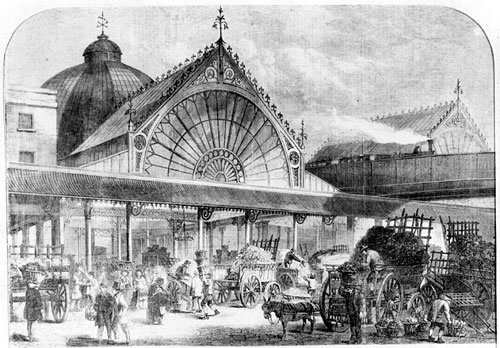
Borough Market, circa 1860

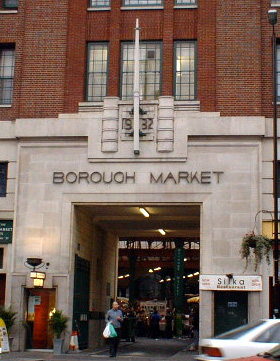
Borough Market, Southwark Street entrance

- Blackfriars Bridge
- London Bridge
- London Millennium Bridge
- Southwark Bridge
- Tower Bridge
- Rotherhithe Tunnel
- Thames Tunnel now part of the Overground network

=== "A" Roads ===
- Roads leading to bridges across the Thames meet at St. George's Circus
- The A201 Inner Ring Road crosses the north-west of the area from the Elephant and Castle to Tower Bridge and the city.
- The A2 runs along Old Kent Road through the north of the borough and is London's main artery from the centre out to Kent.
- The A202 runs along Peckham High Street and passes the town hall.
- The A205 London's South Circular Road runs east–west along Dulwich Common and Thurlow Park Road in the south.
- The boundary with Bromley at Crystal Palace Parade is part of the A212.

=== London Underground (Tube) stations ===
The Bakerloo, Jubilee and Northern lines all run through the borough, below are the stations called at:

- Bermondsey (Jubilee line)
- Borough (Northern line (Bank Branch)
- Canada Water (Jubilee line)
- Elephant & Castle (Bakerloo and Northern line (Bank Branch)
- Kennington (Northern line)
- London Bridge (Jubilee and Northern line (Bank Branch)
- Southwark (Jubilee line)

=== London Overground stations ===
(All stations listed here are on the Windrush line)

- Surrey Quays
- Rotherhithe
- Canada Water (also part of London Underground)
- Denmark Hill
- Peckham Rye
- Queens Road Peckham

=== Railway stations ===
National Rail services in the Borough are operated by Southern, Southeastern and Thameslink.

- Denmark Hill (also part of London Overground)
- East Dulwich
- West Dulwich
- London Bridge
- North Dulwich
- Nunhead
- Peckham Rye (also part of London Overground)
- Queens Road Peckham (also part of London Overground)
- Sydenham Hill
- South Bermondsey
- Elephant & Castle

=== Riverbus piers ===
Operated by Thames Clippers

- Bankside Pier – for Tate Modern and the Globe Theatre
- London Bridge City Pier
- Nelson Dock Pier
- Greenland Pier

=== Parking and DVLA database ban ===
In 2012 it was revealed that the Southwark borough council has been permanently banned from accessing information from the Driver & Vehicle Licensing Agency. This information is normally made available to local authorities for purposes such as enforcing parking fines, but access can be withdrawn if they are found to be mis-using the service. The Big Brother Watch organisation, which obtained the information about the ban under a Freedom of Information request, claimed that "the public are right to be worried that their privacy is at risk across a range of government services."

=== Travel to work ===
In March 2011, the main forms of transport that residents used to travel to work were: bus, minibus or coach, 17.5% of all residents aged 16–74; underground, metro, light rail, tram, 8.5%; train, 8.5%; on foot, 8.2%; driving a car or van, 8.1%; bicycle, 4.9%; work mainly at or from home, 2.8%.

== Places ==
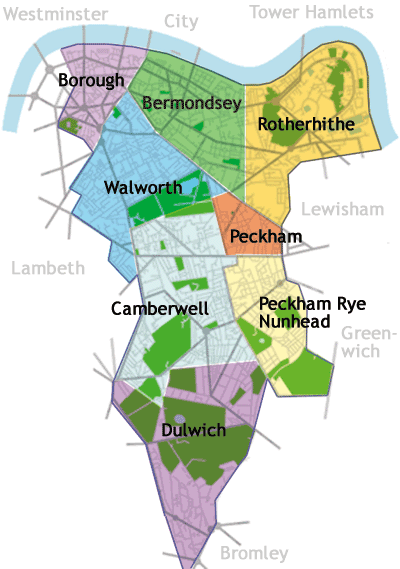
Areas of Southwark

=== Parks and open spaces ===
- Southwark Park
- Burgess Park, (including trees at New Church Road)
- Dulwich Park
- Belair
- Long Meadow a.k.a. Belle Meadow
- Peckham Rye Park
- Russia Dock Woodland
- Sydenham Hill Wood
- Geraldine Mary Harmsworth Park, Lambeth Road, SE1. This park houses the Imperial War Museum although the Museum only owns the land directly in front of it, and the remainder is a public park.
- Nunhead Cemetery
- Newington Gardens (Previously Horsemonger Jail Park. To locals Jail Park )

== Notable residents (past and present) ==
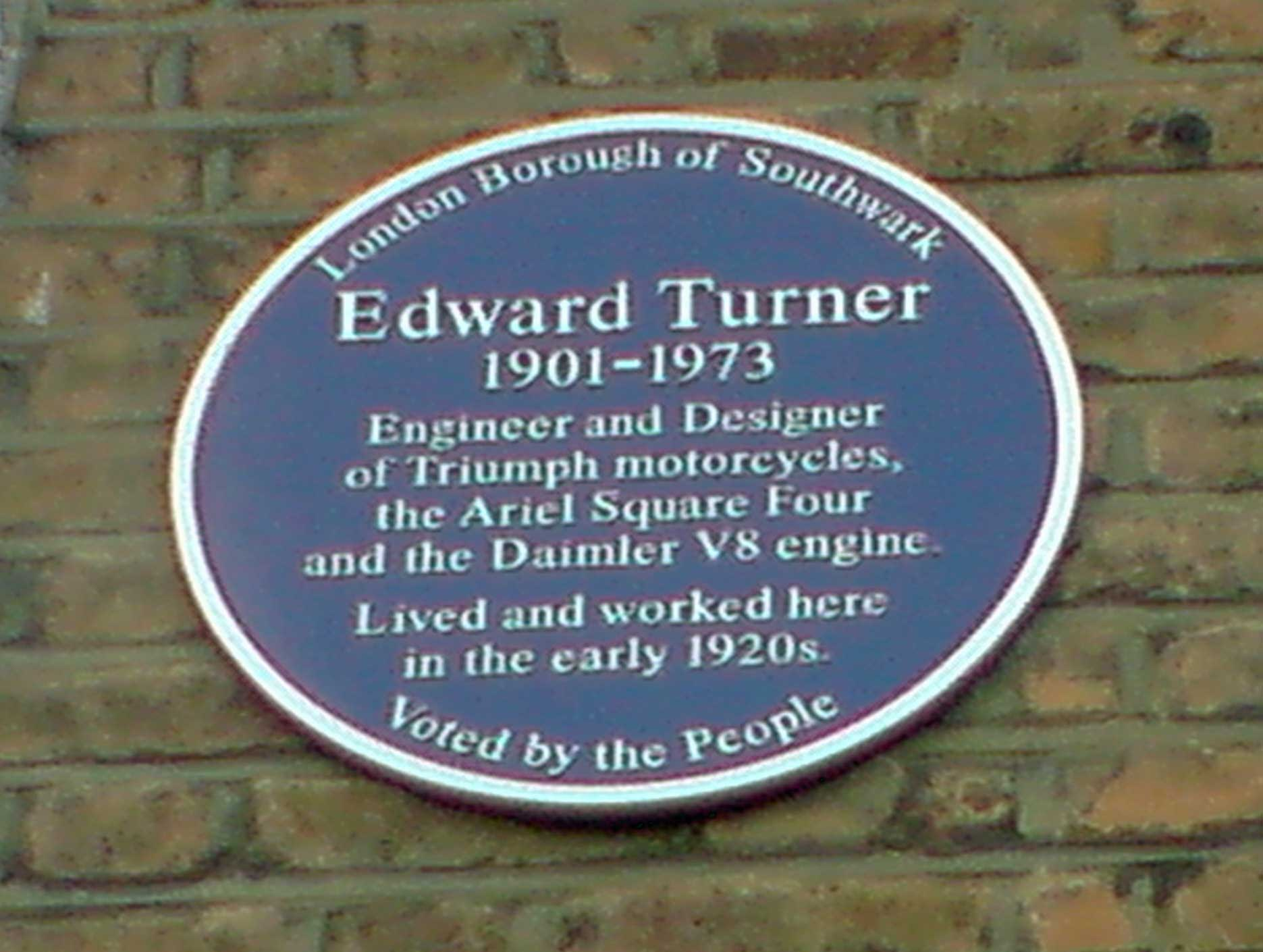
London Borough of Southwark Blue Plaque awarded to famous motorcycle designer Edward Turner unveiled in 2009 at his former residence, 8 Philip Walk, Peckham, London SE15

In 2003, the London Borough of Southwark started a blue plaque scheme for the commemoration of notable residents notably including living people in the awards. The London Borough of Southwark awards Blue Plaques through popular vote following public nomination. Unlike the English Heritage scheme, the original building is not necessary for nomination.

== Civic affairs ==
=== Coat of arms ===
The two supporters on the coat of arms are, on the left, an Elizabethan player dressed to play Hamlet, indicating the theatrical heritage of the area, and the youth on the right side is the Esquire from Chaucer's The Canterbury Tales. The coat of arms is an amalgam of elements of the three constituent Metropolitan Boroughs arms. The chequered band represents the three boroughs together. The cross was a common feature of Southwark and Camberwell. The well in the centre of the shield is a 'canting' reference to Camberwell and the cinquefoils represent the Dulwich area of Camberwell, while the ship on the top left refers to the maritime history of Bermondsey and was part of the Rotherhithe insignia. The rose on the right is from the Southwark arms where it represented St Saviour's parish, i.e. the cathedral.

=== Twinning ===
Southwark is twinned with:

- Langenhagen, Germany
- Clichy, Hauts-de-Seine, France
- Cambridge, Massachusetts, USA

=== Freedom of the Borough ===
The following people and military units have received the Freedom of the Borough of Southwark.

=== Individuals ===
- Lance Sergeant Johnson Beharry: 12 May 2012.
- Sir Michael Caine: 12 May 2012.
- Dame Tessa Jowell: 12 May 2012.
- Harriet Harman : 12 May 2012.
- Sir Simon Hughes: 12 May 2012.

=== Military units ===
- 256 (City of London) Field Hospital (Volunteers): 30 June 2013.
- The Royal Marines Reserve (City of London): 30 June 2013.
- D Company The London Regiment: 30 June 2013.
- 2nd Battalion The Princess of Wales's Royal Regiment.

== See also ==
- Southwark News (local newspaper)
