= Bellenden Road =

Street in Peckham, London, England

Coordinates: 51.4687°N 0.0726°W

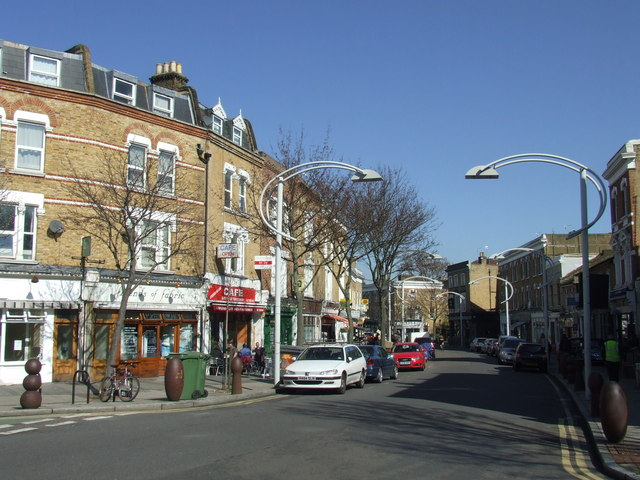
Bellenden Road, Peckham

Bellenden Road is a street in southeast London. The local area around it, situated between Peckham, Camberwell and East Dulwich, is known as Bellenden.

== History ==
Bellenden is claimed by residents to be distinct from any of its surrounding neighbours for a number of reasons, although others argue that it is just part of Peckham, East Dulwich or Camberwell. Named after the 7th Lord Bellenden of Broughton, Bellenden Road was laid out along with neighbouring streets from the 1870s on what had formerly been largely fruit gardens serving the City of London.

== French Influence ==
From its earliest days, Bellenden was populated disproportionately by French Huguenots, and still retains something of its French flavour, with various streets, pubs and businesses carrying French names such as the Montpelier Public House, Petitou Café and Choumert Road attracting a significant French population to the area. For this reason, Bellenden has for some years been known as 'The French Quarter'.

== Art ==
Artists such as Antony Gormley, Tom Phillips and John Latham have lived and worked on Bellenden Road and in the area. As part of Southwark Council's Bellenden Area Renewal Programme, Gormley designed bollards and street furniture for the area, Phillips designed lampposts and mosaics, several shop fronts were refitted and Latham installed a major artwork through the front of his house and studio which he named Flat Time House. Flat Time House is now a publicly accessible art and education space and houses the John Latham archive.

Bellenden has a growing spread of shops and cafes. The Bellenden Road Nature Garden is a nature reserve managed by London Wildlife Trust.

== Political significance ==
Bellenden has been home to a number of politically engaged community groups, such as the Peckham Black Women's Group until 1990, and the Black Lesbian and Gay Centre from 1992 to 1995. The latter was commemorated with a Rainbow Plaque in 2024.
