= Alex Frost (artist) =

- Born: Alexis Frost; Tottenham, London, England
- Education: Glasgow School of Art, University of Staffordshire
- Known for: Sculpture, Drawing

Alex Frost is a British contemporary artist, exhibiting internationally.

== Background ==
Alex Frost currently lives and works in Birmingham, UK. He is an Assistant Professor in Fine Art at Coventry University.

=== Exhibitions ===
Frost's often humorous work addresses the fluid boundaries between public and private space, the virtual and physical, the temporal and permanent. He is best known for his large mosaic sculptures that depict product packaging and branding. These have been included in exhibitions at Dundee Contemporary Arts, Venice Biennale, Milton Keynes Gallery, Studio Voltaire and Frieze Sculpture Park.

In 2018, he devised 'Wet Unboxing', a series of videos he uploaded onto YouTube. In these videos he opened products underwater. The products were representative of a life 'on the go', a lifestyle of super-convenience. Vice Motherboard described these videos as 'a proto-meme—a precious, terrifying embryo—of the next new trend'.

=== Residencies ===
In 2015 he was Phynance Resident at Flat Time House, London. His other residencies include Cove Park, Scotland in 2014; The Walled Garden, Glasgow in 2013; AIR Antwerpen, Belgium in 2010; Glenfiddich Artist Residency, Dufftown, Scotland in 2009; Artsway, Hampshire in 2007; Spike Island, Bristol in 2002 and Grizedale Arts, Cumbria in 2000.

=== Collaborations ===
In addition to his independent art practice he has been involved in a number of artistic collaborations. Notably, devising and running the artist-run radio station Radiotuesday (1998–2002) with Duncan Campbell (artist) and Mark Vernon; Wave Rhythm by Louis Braille (2012) with Stephen Livingstone from Errors (band), a limited edition flexi-disc single generated using a hybrid analogue/digital music and drawing machine and Flourish Nights (2001) a season of screenings and performances organised with the artists Lucy McKenzie, Sophie Macpherson and Julian Kildear.

=== Collections ===
Frost's work is held in numerous private and public collections with his mosaic sculpture Adult (Ryvita/Crackerbread)(2007) in the collection of Glasgow Museums
