= Flat Time House =

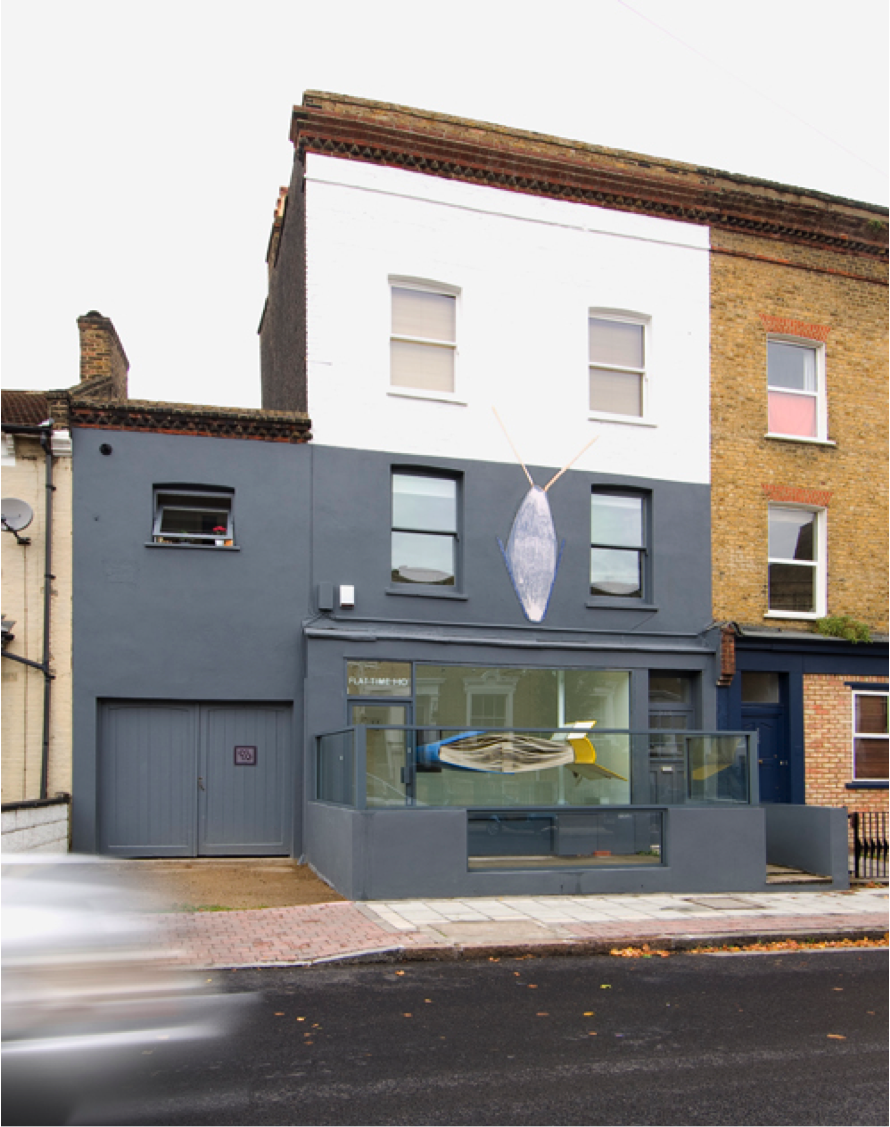

- Location within London
- Established: 2008
- Location: 210 Bellenden Road, London, England
- Coordinates: 51.466036°N 0.074038°W
- Key holdings: John Latham Archive
- Director: Gareth Bell-Jones
- Public transit access: Peckham Rye
- Website: www.flattimeho.org.uk

Flat Time House was the studio home of British conceptual artist John Latham (1921–2006) and is now open as a contemporary art gallery, centre for alternative learning and artist residency space, housing the John Latham archive. It is located on Bellenden Road, South London, England. It is a registered charity under English law.

== Recent exhibitions ==
- Ants and Grasshoppers: reflections on the anxious object – Pavel Büchler, John Cage, Eva Koťátková, John Latham, Sarah Lucas. Curated by David Thorp
- The Bard – William Blake
- Formative Years on Dearth – Sung Tieu
- the billion year spree – Annika Kahrs
- The Psychopathic Now – Jeff Nuttall and Bomb Culture
- Passive Imperative Participation Vibe – Ben Cain
- State 0 – Lina Hermsdorf
- Tears Shared – Marc Camille Chaimowicz with Bruno Pelassy
- Solidarity Avenue – Edward Krasiński
- Palindromes – Barry Flanagan and John Latham

== Residencies ==
- N-U graduate residency – Past residents include Fiona Marron, Rose Parish
- State 0 research residency – Past residents include Katherine Jackson and Sophia Satchell Baeza
- Phynance Residency – Past residents include Alex Frost, Simon and Tom Bloor
- Stuart Whipps – in residence 2012
- Laure Prouvost – in residence 2010

== Funding ==
Flat Time House is publicly funded by Arts Council England and via grant by the John Latham Foundation. Additional financial support for the programme comes from trusts and foundations including the estate of Barry Flanagan, the Henry Moore Foundation, the Danish Arts Council, University College London, Arts and Humanities Research Council, Lisson Gallery and Arts Catalyst.

== See also ==
- South London Gallery
- Peckham Platform
- Raven Row
