= Peckham =

District in London, England

Coordinates: 51.4714°N 0.0625°W

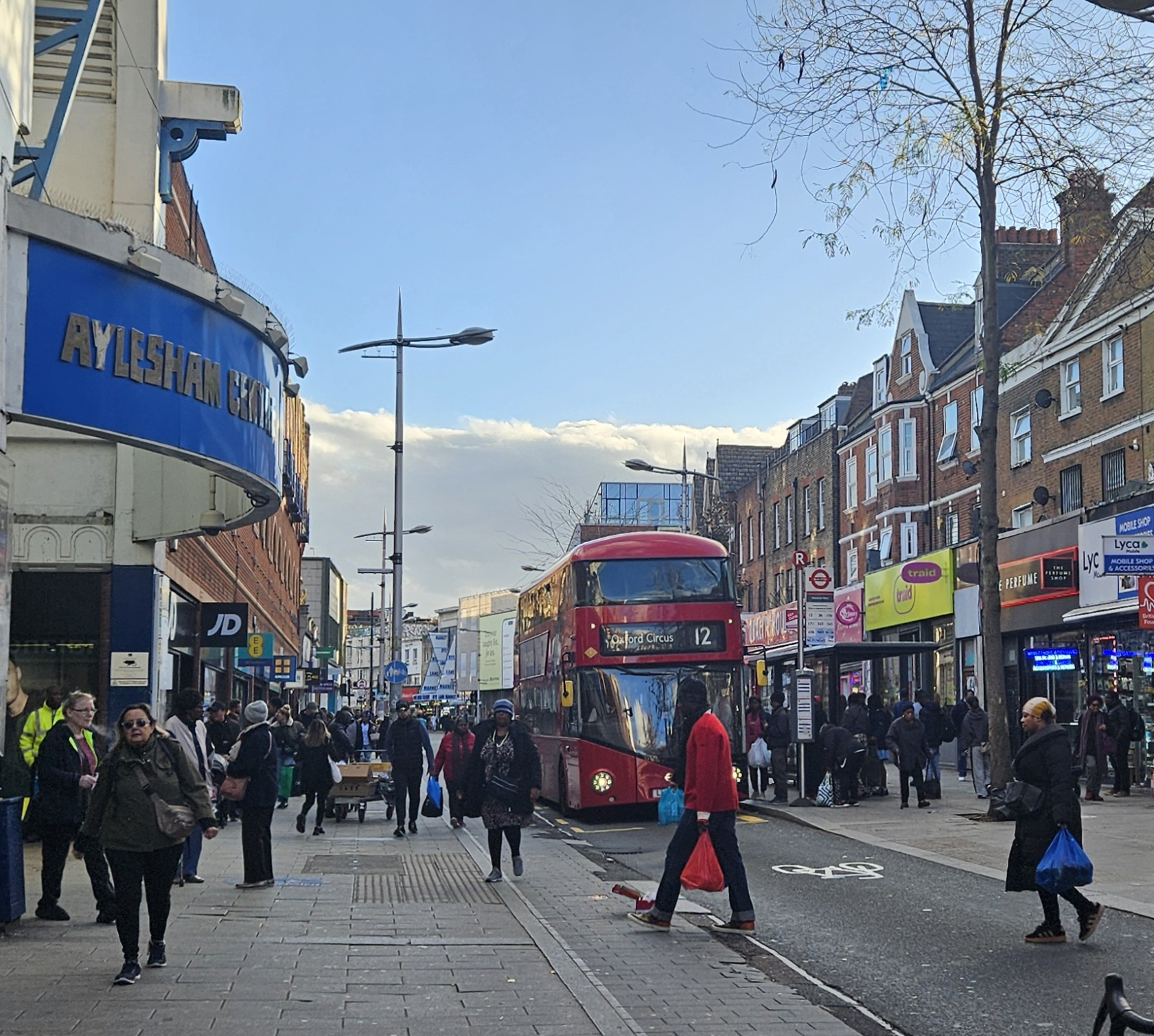
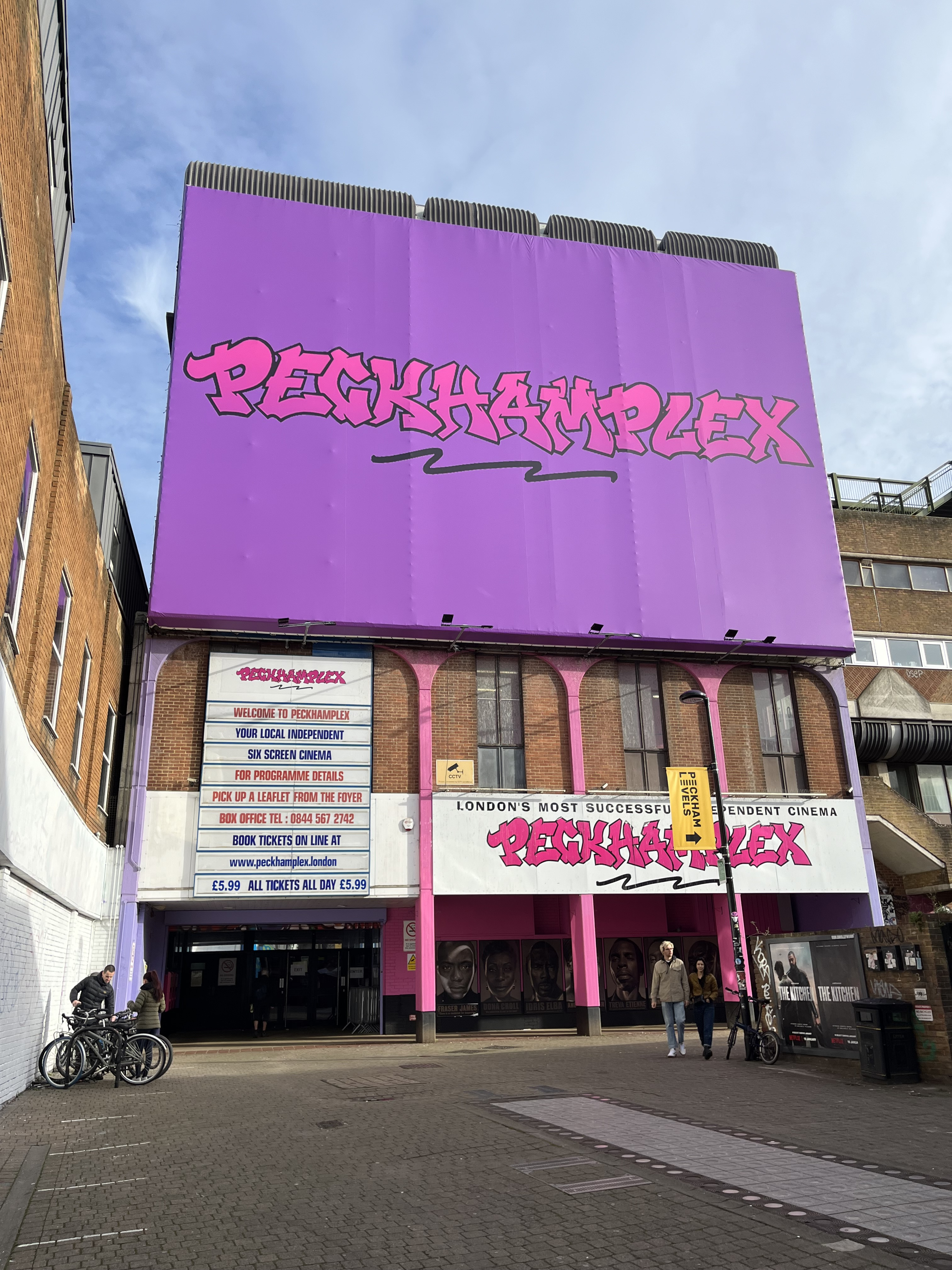
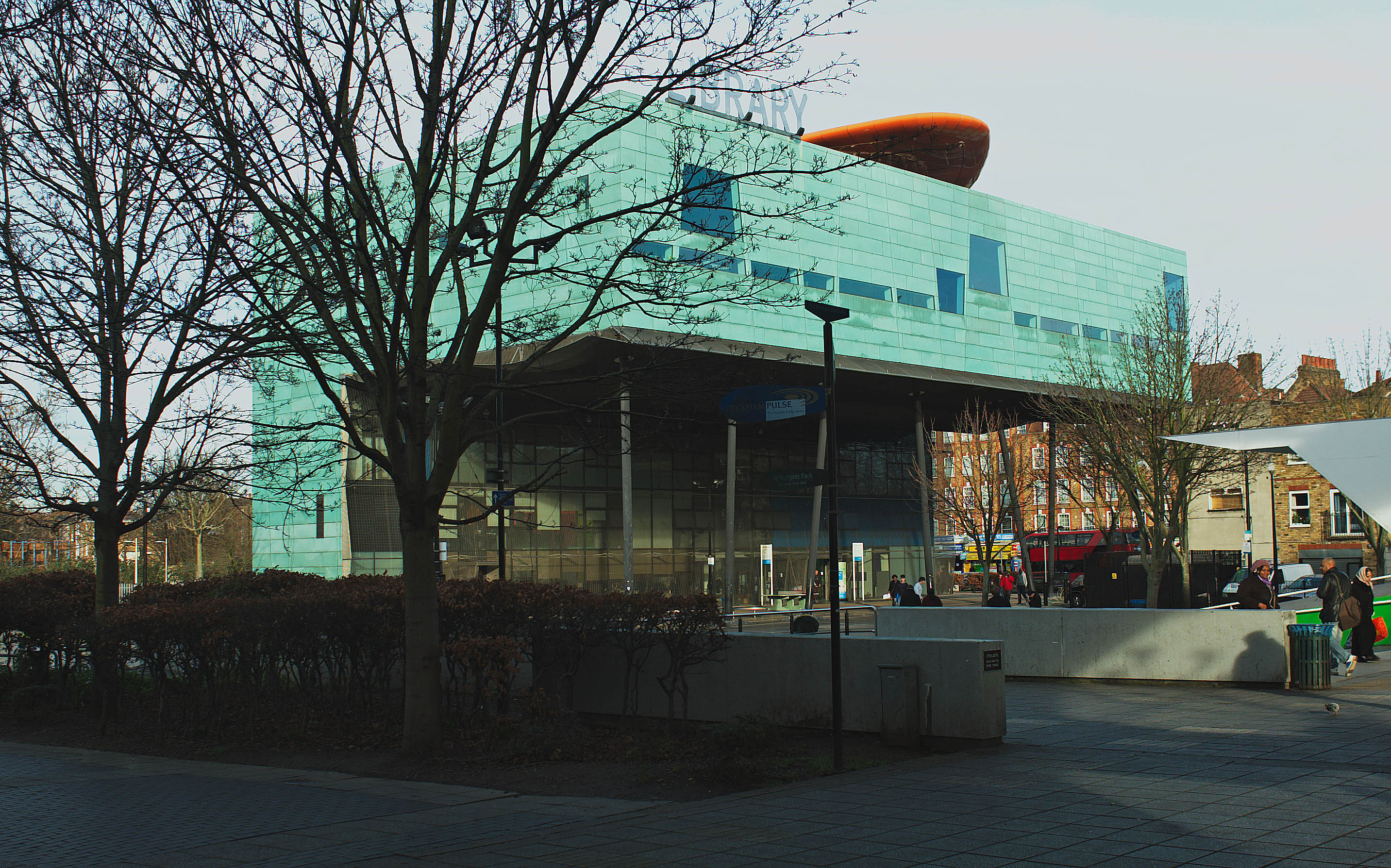
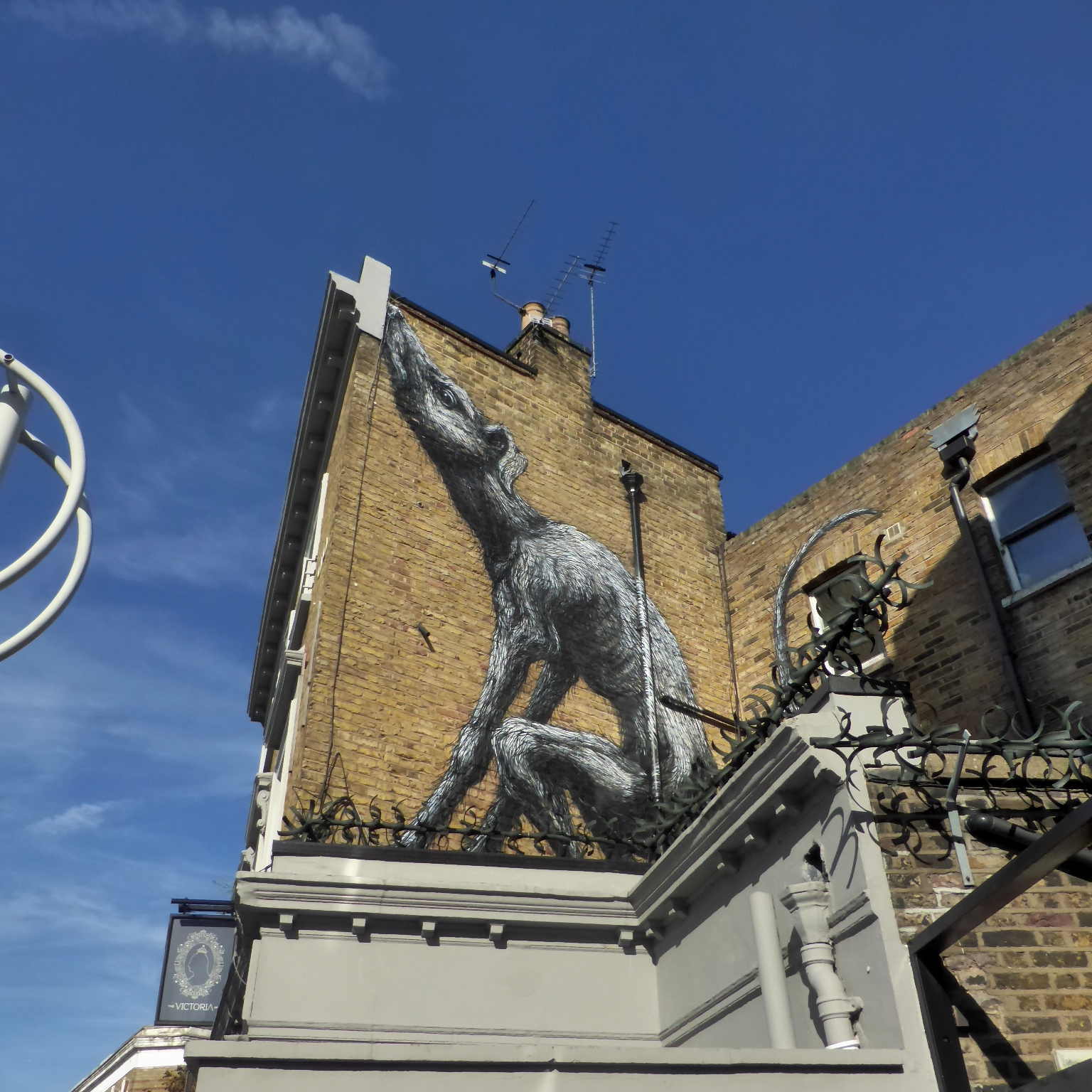
- Rye Lane PeckhamPlex Peckham Library Bellenden Road

- Location within Greater London
- Population: 29,300
- OS grid reference: TQ345765
- London borough: Southwark
- Ceremonial county: Greater London
- Region: London
- Country: England
- Sovereign state: United Kingdom
- Post town: LONDON
- Postcode district: SE15
- Dialling code: 020
- Police: Metropolitan
- Fire: London
- Ambulance: London
- UK Parliament: Peckham
- London Assembly: Lambeth and Southwark

Peckham (/ˈpɛkəm/ PEK-əm) is a district in south-east London, within the London Borough of Southwark. It is 3.5 miles (5.6 km) south-east of Charing Cross. The area is home to about 29,300 residents.

== History ==
Peckham is a Saxon place name meaning the village of the River Peck, a small stream that ran through the district until it was enclosed in 1823. Archaeological evidence indicates earlier Roman occupation in the area, although the name of this settlement is lost. According to David Mills the name's origin is from the Old English *pēac and hām meaning ‘homestead by a peak or hill’, and the name of the river is a back-formation from the name of the village. Peckham Rye is from Old English rīth, meaning 'stream'.

Following the Norman Conquest, the manor of Peckham was granted to Odo of Bayeux and held by the Bishop of Lisieux. It was described as being a hamlet on the road from Camberwell to Greenwich.

Peckham appears in Domesday Book of 1086 as Pecheham. It was held by the Bishop of Lisieux from Odo of Bayeux. Its Domesday assets were: 2 hides. It had land for 1 plough, 2 acres (8,100 m^{2}) of meadow. It rendered 30 shillings (£1.50).

The manor was owned by King Henry I, who gave it to his son Robert, Earl of Gloucester. When Robert married the heiress to Camberwell the two manors were united under royal ownership. King John probably hunted at Peckham and local anecdotes suggest that the right to an annual fair was granted to celebrate a particularly good day's sport. The fair grew to be a rowdy major event lasting three weeks until its abolition in 1827.

Peckham became popular as a wealthy residential area by the 16th century and there are several claims that Christopher Wren had local links. By the 18th century the area was a more commercial centre and attracted industrialists who wanted to avoid paying the expensive rents in central London. Peckham had extensive market gardens and orchards growing produce for the nearby markets of London. Local produce included melons, figs and grapes.

The formal gardens of the Peckham Manor House, rebuilt in 1672 by Sir Thomas Bond were particularly noticeable and can be seen on the Rocque map of 1746. The manor house was sacked in 1688, as its then owner Sir Henry Bond was a Roman Catholic and staunch supporter of James II. The house was demolished in 1797 for the formation of Peckham Hill Street, as the Shard family developed the area. Today Shard's Terrace, the block that contains Manze's Pie and Mash shop, and the western side of Peckham Hill Street represent this Georgian planned expansion.

The village was the last stopping point for many cattle drovers taking their livestock for sale in London. The drovers stayed in the local inns (such as the Red Cow) while the cattle were safely secured overnight in holding pens. Most of the villagers were agricultural or horticultural workers but with the early growth of the suburbs an increasing number worked in the brick industry that exploited the local London Clay. In the early 18th century nonconformist preacher Samuel Chandler was minister in Peckham.

In 1767 William Blake visited Peckham Rye and had a vision of an angel in a tree. In 1993, at the request of the Dulwich Festival, artist Stan Peskett painted a mural of Blake's vision next to the Goose Green playground in East Dulwich.

=== 19th century ===
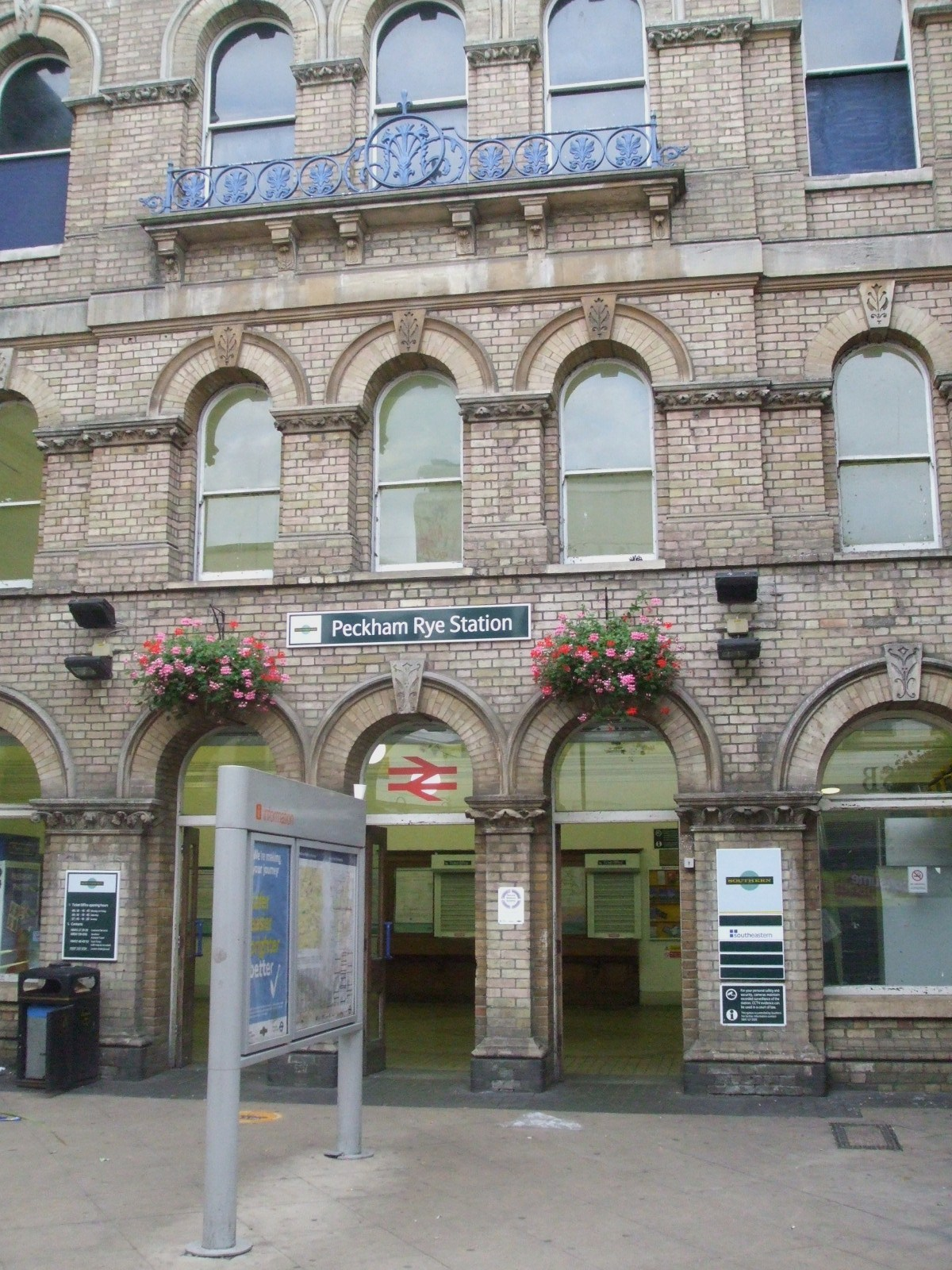
Peckham Rye railway station entrance off Rye Lane

At the beginning of the 19th century, Peckham was synonymous with Peckham Rye: a "small, quiet, retired village surrounded by fields". Since 1744 stagecoaches had travelled with an armed guard between Peckham and London to give protection from highwaymen. The rough roads constrained traffic so a branch of the Grand Surrey Canal was proposed as a route from the Thames to Portsmouth. The canal was built from Surrey Commercial Docks to Peckham before the builders ran out of funds in 1826. The abbreviated canal was used to ship soft wood for construction and even though the canal was drained and backfilled in 1970, Whitten's timber merchants stood on the site known as Eagle Wharf until it closed in 2019 and the location was designated for development.

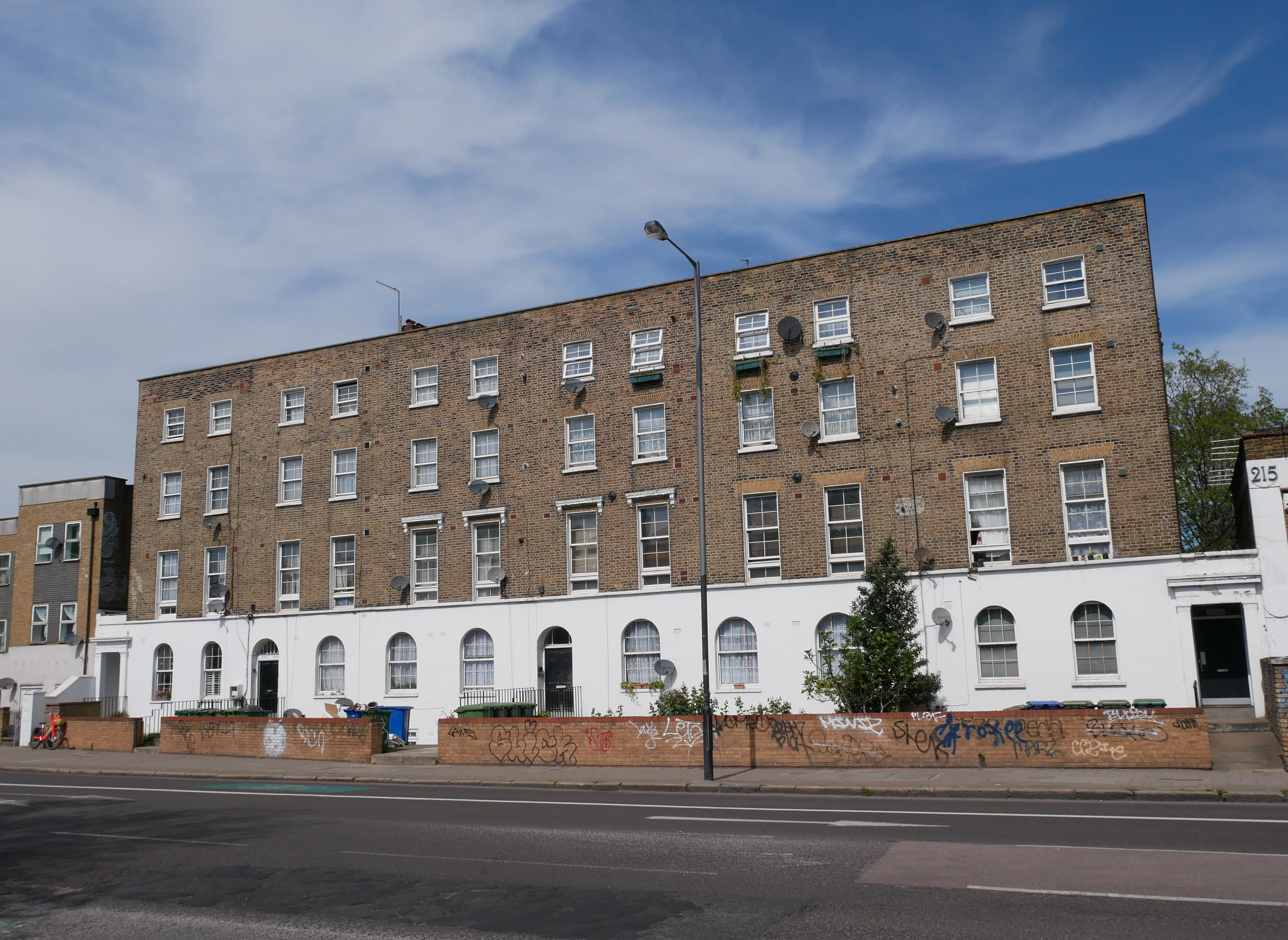
203 to 213 Queen's Road, Peckham

In 1851 Thomas Tilling started an innovative omnibus service from Peckham to London. Tilling's buses were the first to use pre-arranged bus stops, which helped them to run to a reliable timetable. His services expanded to cover much of London until his horses were requisitioned for the Army in the First World War.

During the mid-19th century, housing had spread north and west of Peckham Rye. The area in the north, towards Old Kent Road, on land previously owned by the Hill family (from whom the name Peckham Hill Street was derived) was initially known as Peckham New Town, although it would later become synonymous with Peckham in general (and the "New Town" was abandoned). In the area west of Peckham Rye Common and Peckham Rye Park, many large houses were built.

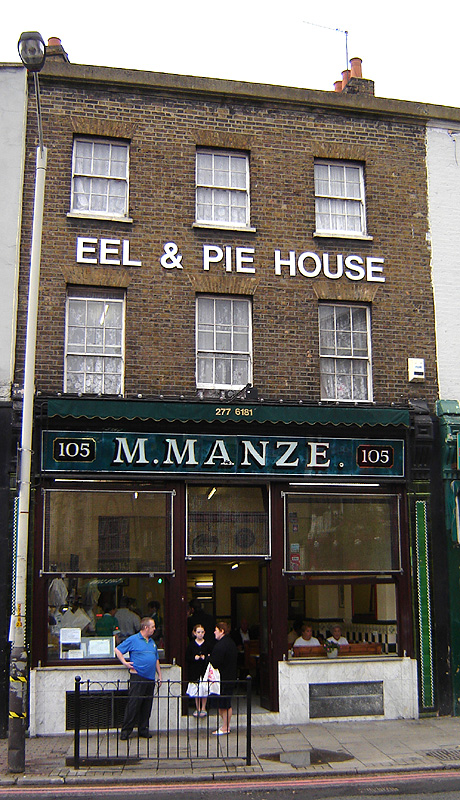
Manze's Eel and Pie House, Peckham

A map showing the Peckham wards of Camberwell Metropolitan Borough as they appeared in 1916

In 1865, Peckham Rye railway station opened. With the arrival of the railway and the introduction of horse-drawn trams about ten years later, Peckham became accessible to artisans and clerical staff working in the city and the docks. Housing for this socio-economic group filled almost all the remaining fields except the Rye. In 1868 the vestry of Camberwell St Giles bought the Rye to keep it as common land. In 1894, responding to concerns about the dangerous overcrowding of the common on holidays, the vestry bought the adjacent Homestall Farm, the last farm in the area, and opened this as Peckham Rye Park.

With the influx of younger residents with money to spend Rye Lane became a major shopping street. In 1867, Jones & Higgins opened a small shop on the corner of Rye Lane and Peckham High Street that became the best known department store in south London for many years. It closed in the 1980s. In 1870, George Gibson Bussey moved to Peckham and set up a firm described as "Firearms, Ammunition & Shooting” at the Museum Works, Rye Lane, Peckham. The Museum of Firearms was built in 1867. The 1868 Ordnance Survey map shows the museum building with a rifle range at the rear extending along the side of the railway embankment for 150 yards.

The late 19th century also saw the arrival of George Batty, a manufacturer of condiments, whose main business stood at Finsbury Pavement. The company's Peckham premises occupied 19 railway arches. It was acquired by the H. J. Heinz Company in 1905 as their first UK manufacturing base.

Peckham came within the newly created Metropolitan Borough of Camberwell and County of London in 1889.

The southern end of Peckham was the location for the railway line that once served the Crystal Palace in Sydenham. Though the line was eventually dismantled due to the collapse of the embankment into the gardens of Marmora Road it is still possible to see large sections of it. The flats on Wood Vale and the full length of Brenchley Gardens trace its route.

Close by is the Aquarius Golf Club, which is located over the cavernous Honor Oak Reservoir constructed between 1901 and 1909. When it was completed it was the largest brick built underground reservoir in the world and is still one of the largest in Europe. The reservoir now forms part of the Southern extension of the Thames Water Ring Main.

Camberwell Old Cemetery, on Forest Hill Road, is a later example of the ring of Victorian cemeteries that were built to alleviate the overcrowding of churchyards that was experienced with the rapid expansion of London in the 19th century. The Stone House at its main entrance was used as a film location for Entertaining Mr. Sloane (1970), adapted from the Joe Orton play. It was gutted by fire in the mid-1970s and rebuilt some years later. Camberwell Old Cemetery did not have the grandeur of nearby Nunhead Cemetery, which was one of the original London necropoleis, and once nearing capacity it was replaced by Camberwell New Cemetery on Brenchley Gardens.

Brenchley Gardens Park follows the route of the old line to the Crystal Palace culminating at the High Level station. The park runs behind Marmora Road and the remains of the embankment then continues along Wood Vale where flats were built on it. The line was closed in 1954 following a decline in its use after the destruction of the Crystal Palace in 1936 and due to slippage in the structure of the embankment.

=== 20th century ===
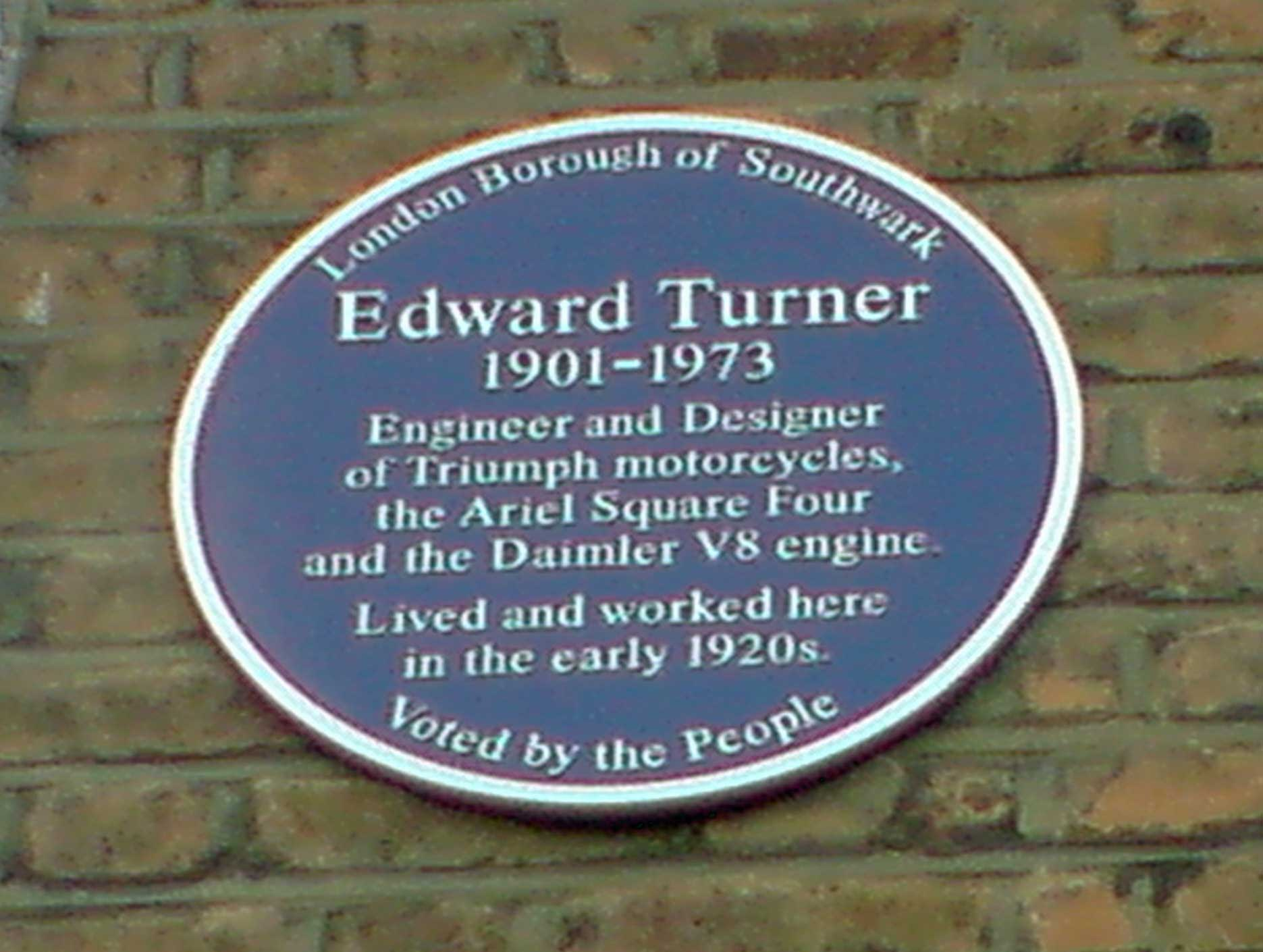
London Borough of Southwark blue plaque awarded to motorbike designer Edward Turner unveiled in 2009 at his former residence, 8 Philip Walk, Peckham. Turner had run a motorbike shop, Chepstow Motors on Peckham High Street

In the 1930s George Scott Williamson and Innes Pearse opened the Pioneer Health Centre in Queens Road. They planned to conduct a large experiment into the effect of environment on health. 'The Peckham Experiment' recruited 950 families who paid one shilling (equivalent to £3 in 2025) a week for access to something like a modern sports club with facilities for physical exercise, games, workshops and socialising with no mandatory programme. The centre moved into a purpose-built modernist building by the architect Sir Owen Williams in 1935.

North Peckham Estate, 1984.

In 1965, the Metropolitan Borough of Camberwell was abolished and the area then fell roughly within the newly created London Borough of Southwark. North Peckham was heavily redeveloped in the 1960s, consisting mainly of high-rise flats to rehouse people from dilapidated old houses. It was popular on its completion for offering a high quality and modern standard of living. However, high unemployment and a lack of economic opportunities led to urban decay and a period of decline in the late 1970s. The North Peckham Estate became one of the most deprived residential areas in Western Europe. Vandalism, graffiti, arson attacks, burglaries, robberies and muggings were commonplace, and the area became an archetypal London sink estate.

As a result, the area was subjected to a £290 million regeneration programme in the late 1990s and early 2000s. After the beginning of the regeneration, the estate gained nationwide notoriety in the media when 10-year-old Nigerian resident Damilola Taylor was stabbed to death on the estate on 27 November 2000. A gang operating in the area is the Peckham Boys.

In the early 1990s Peckham was a centre of underground music partly due to a large squat known as The Dolehouse in a disused, two-floor DHSS building near Peckham High Street. The building was already known for having featured in the cover shot of a 1980s pictorial biography of 1960s' mods, featuring them on their customised scooters outside the then Camberwell Labour Exchange.

In 1989, the squatters adopted the name Dole House Crew and along with another local group of squatters called the "Green Circus", held regular gigs/parties in the building. They moved on to many other South East London venues after the Peckham Dolehouse was evicted in late October 1990. A squatted social centre called the Spike Surplus Scheme ran from 1998 until being evicted by the council in 2009.

Peckham was one of the areas where riots took place during the 2011 England riots.

Peckham was home to the Peckham Black Women's Centre until 1990, and to the Black Lesbian and Gay Centre from 1992 to 1995. In 2024 a Rainbow Plaque commemorating the Black Lesbian and Gay Centre was unveiled on Bellenden Road.

== Current status ==
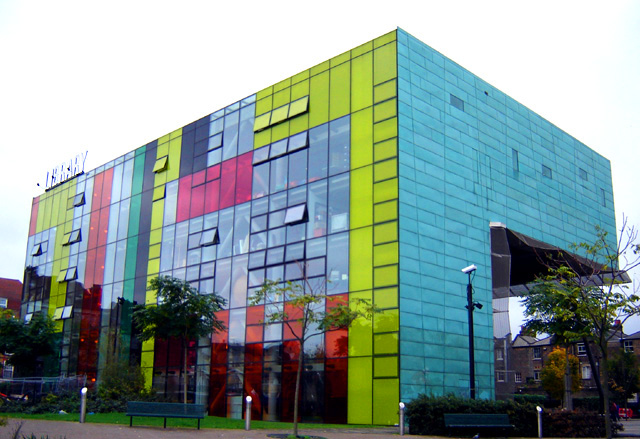
The award-winning Peckham Library, 2005

Since the 1990s the European Union has invested in the regeneration of the area; partly funding the award-winning Peckham Library, a new town square and new housing to replace the North Peckham Estate. State funding is being provided to improve the housing stock and renovate the streets. This includes funding for public arts projects like the Tom Phillips mosaics on the wall of the Peckham Experiment restaurant.

1994 saw the completion of the Peckham Arch designed by architects Troughton McAslan and funded in part by a £1m SRB (Single Regeneration Budget) grant. The arch is due to be demolished to make way for 19 flats; the decision was made despite public protests.

The main shopping street is Rye Lane and the large Peckham Rye Park is nearby. Bellenden Road is an area of small independent shops.

== Culture and identity ==
Peckham has never been an administrative district, or a single ecclesiastical parish in its own right, but it developed a strong sense of identity in the 19th century when Rye Lane was one of the most important shopping streets in south London. The area is identified in the London Plan as one of 35 major centres in Greater London.

The area known as Peckham covers a large area of south London and takes in many diverse communities. The British Nigerian community forms a sizeable component of the population of the area, with the area being dubbed "Little Lagos" as a result. As of 2011, the whole Peckham area had a Nigerian-born population of 5,250 people.

A traditional London working class community now coexists with communities that have their origins in the Caribbean, China, India, Ghana, Zimbabwe, Nigeria, Somalia, Pakistan, Bangladesh, Turkey, Eastern Europe and Vietnam. As well as these communities there has been a steady gentrification of some of the areas in the south of Peckham and this has meant an influx of cafés, wine bars, niche shops and artists' studios.

== Ethnicity ==
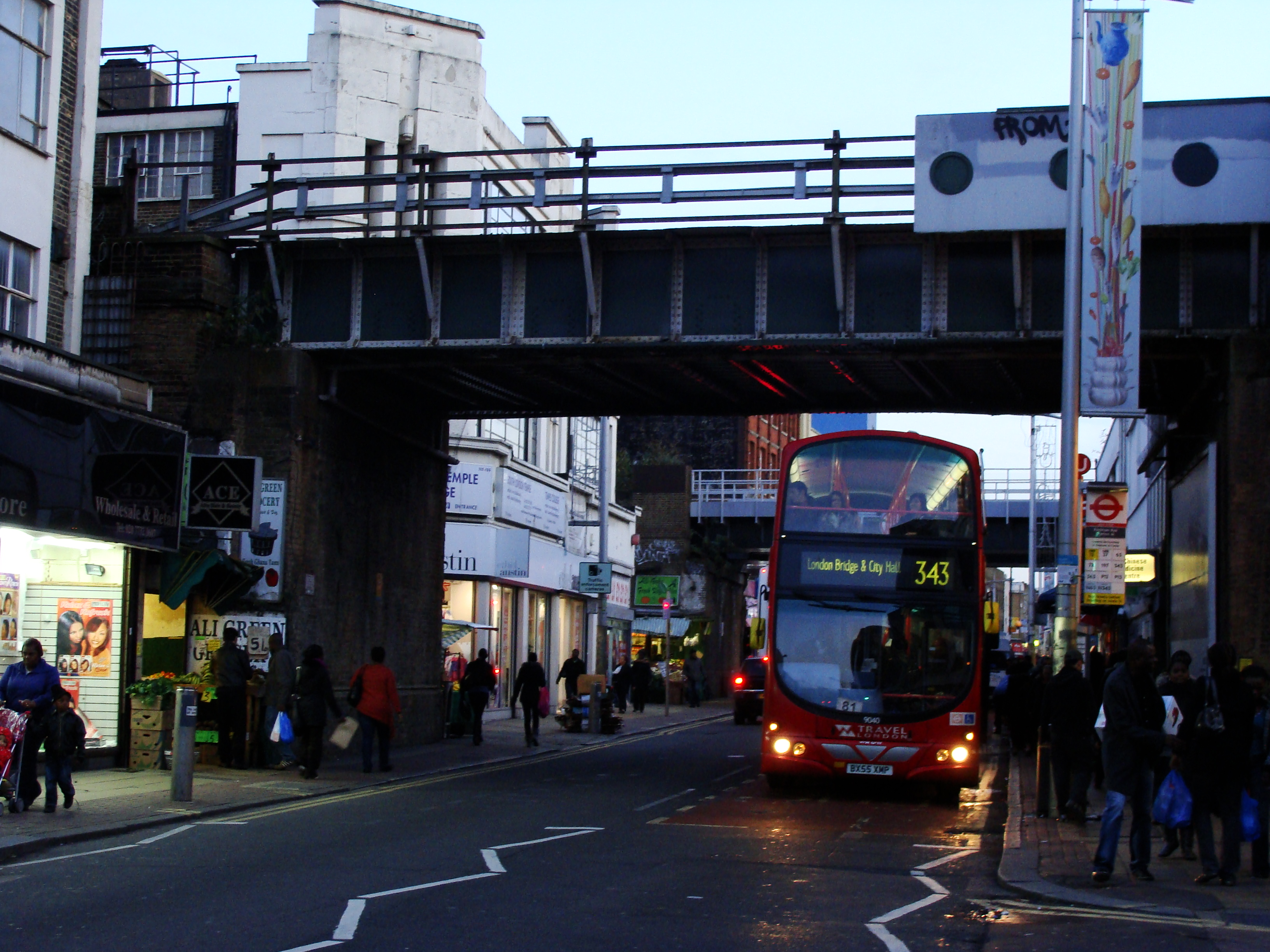
Rye Lane, Peckham's main shopping area shown where it runs perpendicular to Peckham Rye railway station.

Peckham is one of the most ethnically diverse areas of the UK. These are the 2011 statistics for the ethnic groups in the Peckham ward. This ward is about one-fifth of the place called Peckham, and not representative of the ethnic and cultural distribution in the other four wards.

- 50.4% Black/African/Caribbean
- 29.2% White
- 9.1% Asian
- 7.1% Mixed/multiple ethnic groups
- 4.3% Other ethnic group

== Governance ==
Peckham is part of the Peckham constituency for elections to the House of Commons of the United Kingdom and Peckham ward for elections to Southwark London Borough Council.

== In fiction ==
Muriel Spark's 1960 novel The Ballad of Peckham Rye is set in the area, as is Lizzie Damilola Blackburn's 2022 romcom novel Yinka, Where Is Your Huzband?.

Peckham was the setting of the television sitcom Only Fools and Horses in its run as a regular series from 1981 to 1991, as well as Christmas specials until 2003. The majority of the scenes were filmed in Bristol, and around other parts of London. The spin-off, Rock & Chips, was also set in Peckham in the 1960s.

The television situation comedy Desmond's, made by Channel 4, as well as its spin-off, Porkpie, were filmed and set in Peckham. The comedies Meet the Adebanjos and The Tboy Show, both directed by Debra Odutuyo, were set in Peckham.

A 30-minute musical called We The Ragamuffin was set in Peckham, and filmed in the area, mainly on the North Peckham Estate. The film used local musicians with an improvised script and was broadcast on Channel 4 in February 1992. The film was written and produced by Russell Newell and directed by Julian Henriques.

Peckham was home of the fictional character Rose Tyler, a former leading character in the British TV show Doctor Who. Her flat on a fictional council estate in the area is regularly shown during her time on the show.

The E4 show Youngers is filmed and set in Peckham.

In the television series Foyle's War, Series Eight, Adam Wainright, Samantha's husband, is elected in 1947 as Labour Member of Parliament for the fictional constituency of 'West Peckham'.

Four of the 12 main characters in Bernardine Evaristo's 2019 novel Girl, Woman, Other are connected to the fictive Peckham School for Boys and Girls as either teachers or pupils.

The 2023 film Rye Lane is largely set in Peckham, and is named for the street there. The film features real-life locations, including the restaurants Coal Rooms and Il Giardino, Rye Lane Market, the Rye Lane branch of Morley's, and the Peckhamplex cinema.

Key scenes in the 2023 romantic comedy Love at First Sight take place at the fictional Peckham House.

== Notable people ==
- John Boyega, actor and producer.
- Rio Ferdinand, English footballer.
- Claire Foy, actress, lived in Peckham for several years.
- Julius Francis, boxing champion
- Sydney Frederick Galvayne, horse tamer and author
- Giggs, rapper.
- Phyllis Green, high jumper.
- Damson Idris, actor and producer.
- Kenny Imafidon.
- King Krule was raised between Peckham and East Dulwich.
- Kwengface, rapper
- SL, rapper
- Alan Lancaster, founder, bassist-vocalist for Status Quo
- Naira Marley, Afro-pop artiste.
- Mary Phillip, English footballer
- Cosmo Pyke, singer-songwriter born in Peckham
- Damilola Taylor, Nigerian immigrant who was murdered in Peckham in 2000
- Ashley Walters, actor and rapper
- Kye Whyte, BMX racing Olympic silver medalist
- Susan Wokoma, actress, writer, director
- Marianne Jean-Baptiste, Oscar nominated actress.
- Caleb Femi, poet, writer, photographer, director

== Transport and locale ==
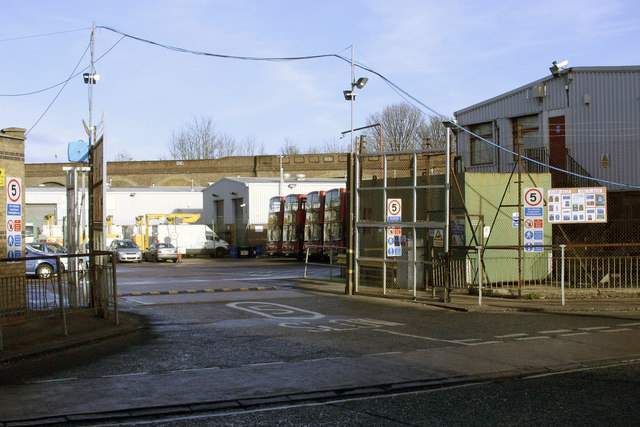
Peckham bus garage

=== Nearest places ===
- Bermondsey
- New Cross
- Camberwell
- East Dulwich
- Nunhead
- Brockley
- Walworth
- Rotherhithe

=== Nearest railway stations ===
Like most of southeast London, Peckham has never been served by the London Underground. If and when the Bakerloo line extension is complete, a new tube station will be built on Asylum Road northeast of the centre of Peckham, near the A2 road and Brimmington Park. It will be located between another new station at Burgess Park and the existing railway station at New Cross Gate. Existing railway stations in the district are as follows:

- Peckham Rye railway station (London Overground's Windrush line, Southeastern, Southern and Thameslink services)
- Queens Road Peckham railway station (London Overground's Windrush line and Southern services)
- Nunhead railway station (Southeastern and Thameslink services)

=== Bus transport ===
Peckham bus garage is operated by London Central and is situated in Blackpool Road. It opened in 1994 and replaced a similar but larger facility in Peckham High Street on part of whose site the present bus station now stands. A viaduct behind it carries the railway east of Peckham Rye railway station.
