= Beulah =

Beulah is a term from the Biblical Hebrew to refer to Yahweh's country, Beulah (land). It may also refer to:

== People ==
- Beulah (given name), derivation of the name and list of people with this name
- Beulah (singer), UK-based female singer-songwriter

== Places ==
=== Australia ===
- Beulah, Gilead, a heritage-listed property in the south-western Sydney suburb of Gilead, New South Wales
- Beulah, Tasmania, a township
- Beulah, Victoria, a town
- Beulah Park, South Australia, a suburb of Adelaide

=== Canada ===
- Beulah, Manitoba, a village

=== United Kingdom (Wales) ===
- Beulah, Ceredigion, a village
- Beulah, Powys, a village

=== United States ===
- Beulah, Alabama, an unincorporated community
- Beulah, California, former unincorporated community
- Beulah, Colorado, an unincorporated town
- Beulah, Escambia County, Florida, an unincorporated community in Escambia County, Florida
- Beulah, Orange County, Florida, an unincorporated community in Orange County, Florida
- Beulah, Georgia, an unincorporated town
- Beulah, Iowa, an unincorporated community
- Beulah, Kansas, an unincorporated community
- Beulah, Maryland, an unincorporated community
- Beulah, Michigan, a village
- Beulah Township, Cass County, Minnesota
- Beulah, Mississippi, a town
- Beulah, Missouri, an unincorporated community
- Beulah, New York, a hamlet
- Bottom, North Carolina, an unincorporated community more commonly known as Beulah locally
- Beulah, North Dakota, a city
- Beulah, Oregon, an unincorporated community
- Beulah, Pennsylvania, a ghost town on the Ghost Town Trail rail trail
- Beulah, Angelina County, Texas, a ghost town
- Beulah, Virginia, an unincorporated community
- Beulah, Wyoming, a census-designated place
- Beulah Road, a section of Virginia State Route 613 (Fairfax County)
- Lake Beulah, Wisconsin, an unincorporated community in the town of East Troy, Walworth County

== Arts and entertainment ==
- Beulah (Blake), in William Blake's mythology is the land, a dreamy paradise
- Beulah (novel), an 1859 novel by author Augusta Jane Evans Wilson
- Beulah (radio and TV series), a 1940s radio series and 1950s television series, and the main character of that show
- Beulah (band), a rock band associated with the Elephant Six Collective
- "Beulah", a song by Devo, performed on DEVO Live: The Mongoloid Years
- Beulah, an underground all-female town in the 1977 novel The Passion of New Eve by Angela Carter
- Beulah, a 2016 album by John Paul White

== Other ==
- Hurricane Beulah (disambiguation)
- Beulah College, a school in Tonga
- Beulah Baptist Church, Alexandria, Virginia
- Beulah Presbyterian Church, Churchill, Pennsylvania
- Beulah or Beulah Speckled Face, a breed of sheep from the area around Beulah, Powys, Wales

== See also ==
- Beulah Heights (disambiguation)
- "Beulah Land", a gospel hymn dating from 1875 or 1876
- Beulah Park (disambiguation)
- Land of Beulah, a fictional location in The Pilgrim's Progress by John Bunyan
- Beula (disambiguation)
