= Beulah (given name) =

- Pronunciation: /ˈbjuːlə/ BEW-lə
- Gender: female
- Language: Hebrew

Origin
- Origin: Book of Isaiah
- Meaning: married

Beulah (/ˈbjuːlə/ BEW-lə), a feminine given name, originated from the Hebrew word (בְּעוּלָ֑ה bə‘ūlāh), used in the Book of Isaiah as a prophesied attribute of the land of Israel. The King James Bible transliterates the word and translates it as "married" (see Isaiah 62:4). An alternative translation is "espoused", see for example Isaiah 62:4 (Mechon Mamre). The Online Etymology Dictionary relates the word to baal, meaning "owner, master, lord".

Literary works have used "Beulah" as the name of a mystical place, somewhere between Earth and Heaven. It was so used in The Pilgrim's Progress by John Bunyan and in the works of William Blake, for example several times in The Four Zoas.

== People ==
- Beulah Annan (1899–1928), American suspected murderer and the model for the character Roxie Hart (from Chicago)
- Beulah Armstrong (1895–1965), American mathematician
- Beulah Bewley (1929–2018) British public health physician
- Beulah Blackmore (1886–1967), American home economist
- Beulah Bondi (1888–1981), American actress
- Beulah H. Brown (1892–1987), American artist
- Beulah Burke (1885–1975), co-founder of Alpha Kappa Alpha, the first sorority founded by African American women
- Beulah Marie Dix (1876–1970), American screenwriter and author of children's books
- Beulah Benton Edmondson (1884–1957) Cherokee teacher, entertainer, heiress, and socialite
- Beulah Gundling (1916–2003), American synchronized swimmer
- Beulah Louise Henry (1887–1973), American inventor
- Beulah Elfreth Kennard (1869-after 1944), American Trades Union activist
- Beulah McGillicutty, stage name of Trisa Hayes Laughlin (born 1969), American pro wrestling valet
- Beulah Poynter (1883–1960), American actress and writer
- Beulah Quo (1923–2002), American actress and activist
- Beulah Winn Stunston (1880–1959), American civic leader
- Beulah Georgia Tann (1891–1950), American social worker and child trafficker
- Beulah Thumbadoo, South African literacy campaigner
- Beulah Rebecca Hooks Hannah Tingley (1893–1986), Florida politician
- Beulah Woodard (1895–1955), American sculptor
- Beulah Woolston (1828–1886), pioneering American missionary teacher in China

== Fictional characters ==
- Beulah Brown, the title character of the 1940s and '50s radio and television series Beulah
- Beullah Lisa Wilkes, Will's girlfriend and onetime fiancée in The Fresh Prince of Bel-Air
- Beulah Bleak, sister of Klarion the Witch Boy in Seven Soldiers
- Beulah Jackson, a character from the television series Dutton Ranch.

== See also ==
- Beulah (disambiguation)
- Beulah (Blake)
