= Norwood Ridge =

Ridge in south London

The Norwood Ridge is an elevated area of south London contained within the London boroughs of Croydon, Bromley, Lambeth, Southwark and Lewisham. It aligns approximately south-southeast to north-northwest. Historically, it was part of the area covered by the Great North Wood that gave Norwood its name and was later the site of the relocated Crystal Palace at Sydenham Hill and nationally important telecommunications towers.

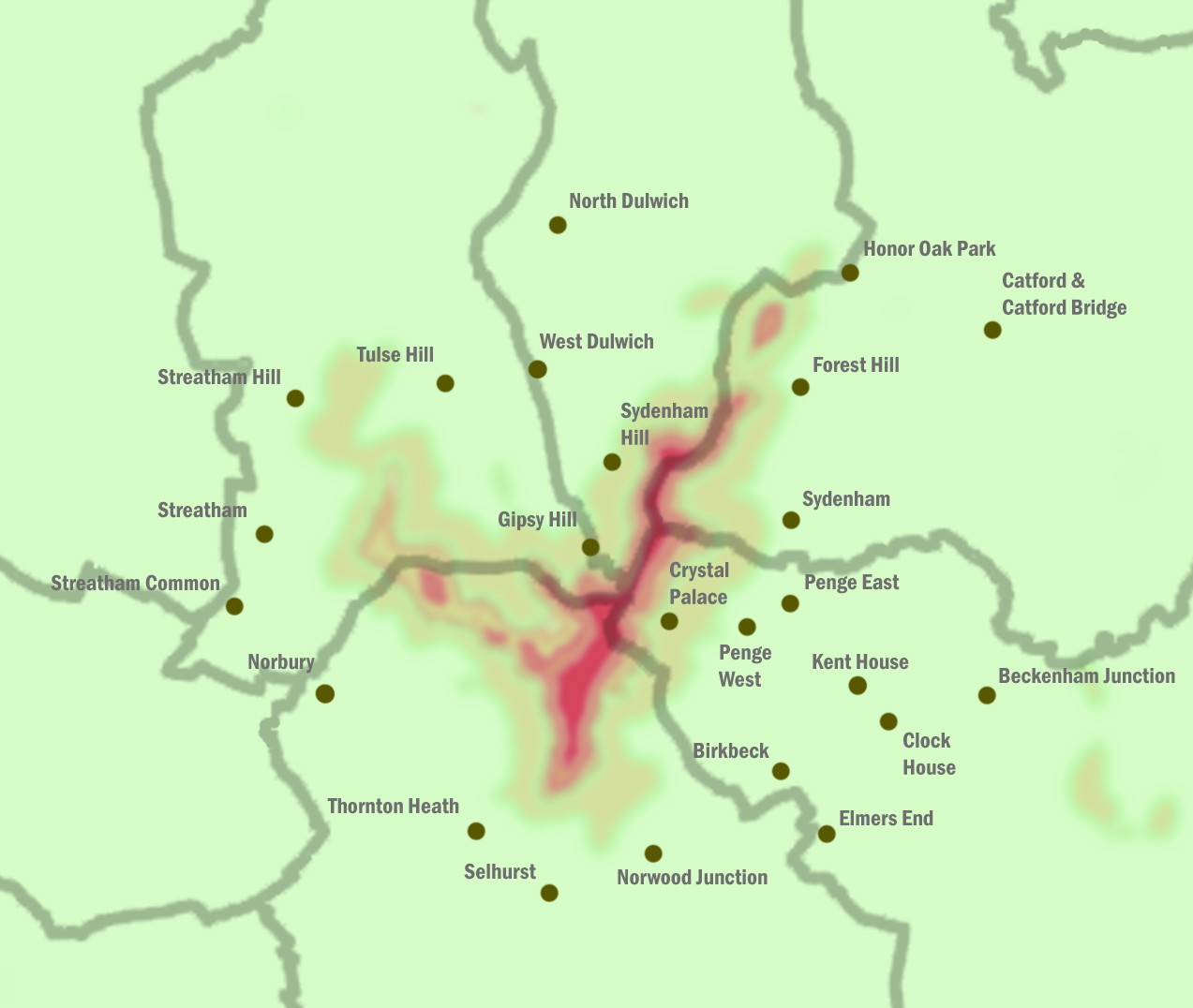
Norwood Ridge showing higher elevations in darker red, approximate borough boundaries in grey and local railway stations

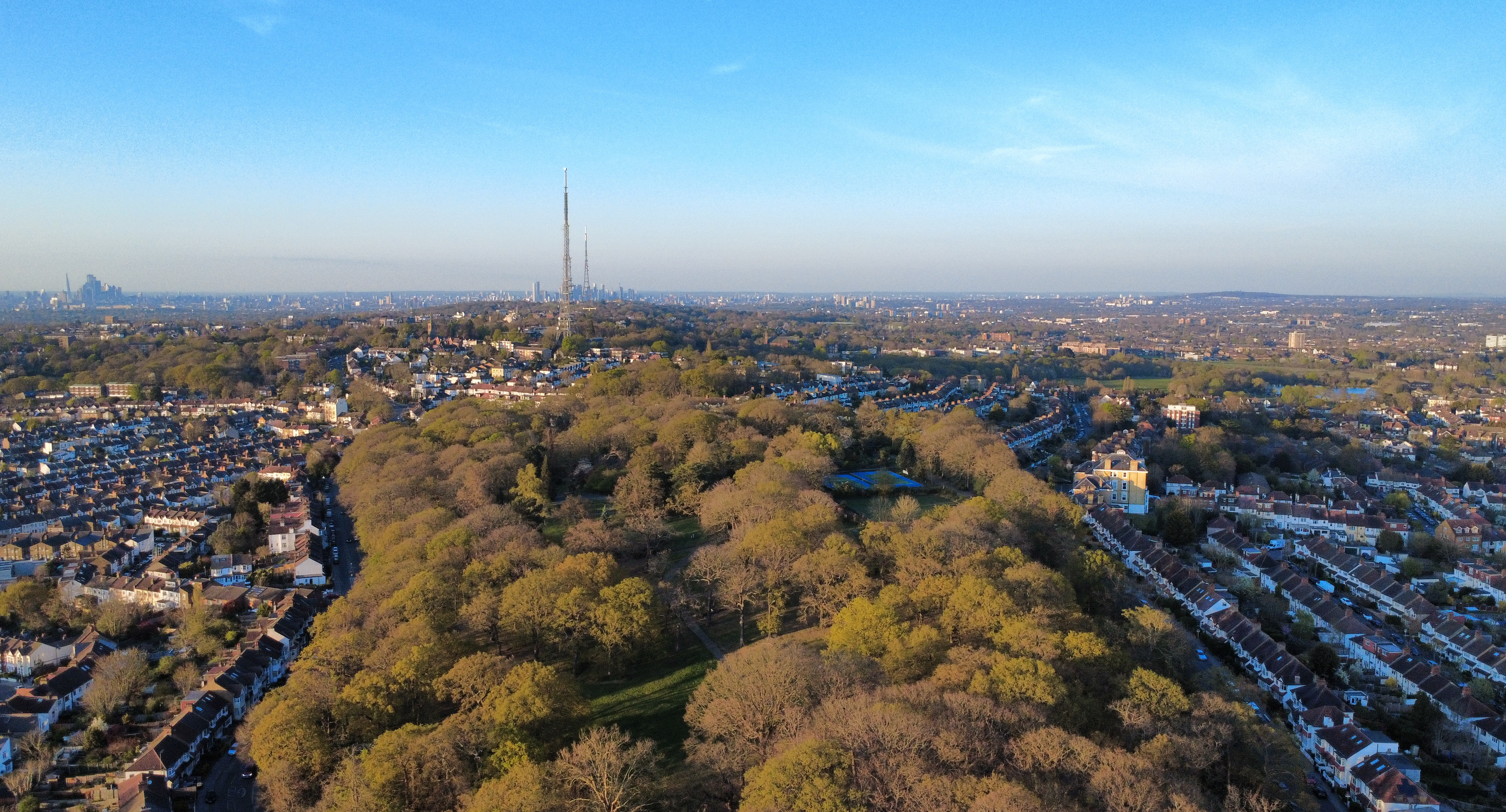
Looking NNE along the Norwood Ridge from above Grangewood Park. The distant line of trees shows the ridge sloping down to the left and right. The Croydon and Crystal Palace transmitters stand on the highest parts with London Docklands beyond.

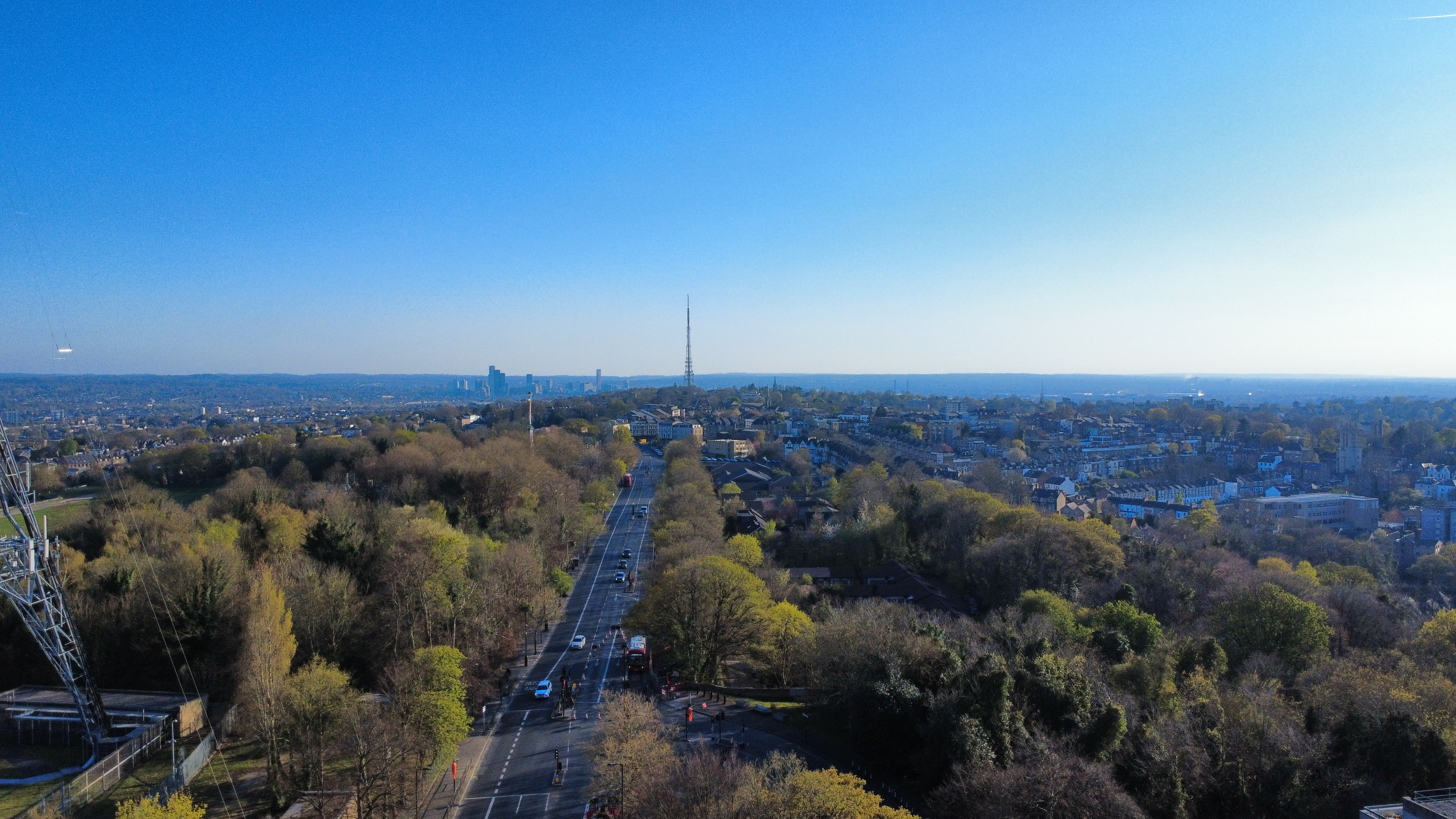
Norwood Ridge looking SSW from Crystal Palace Parade near the Crystal Palace transmitter. The distant Croydon transmitter stands close to the highest elevation of the ridge. The slope either side is clear from the line of woodland, with Central Croydon beyond.

Extract from a relief map of London with borough boundaries showing the Norwood Ridge central to the image.

== Physical Geography ==
The bedrock of the ridge is London Clay formation, part of the Thames Group, made up of clay and silt layers of the Palaeogene period, formed between 56 and 47.8 million years ago (mya) in what was a marine shoreline. This clay rises in the south at Selhurst in the borough of Croydon, through Grangewood Park, to its highest points in a band along the roads South Norwood Hill, Beulah Hill, Church Road, Crystal Palace Parade and Sydenham Hill before descending to variable lower elevations at Forest Hill and Honor Oak in the borough of Lewisham. Western spurs extend into the borough of Lambeth. The highest elevation of the ridge is 116 metres, around the southern end of Church Road and close to the site of the Croydon transmitter.

The elevated London Clay is overlain by a more resistant Claygate member, a sandier sub-unit of the London Clay formed between 56 and 48.1 mya, in beds of up to 16 metres depth which align with the ridge, running from South Norwood Hill to west of Forest Hill. On top of the Claygate beds, the highest points of the ridge consist of overlying superficial river deposits of sand and gravel of uncertain age and origin but which have been attributed to an ancient eastward-flowing river present in the Quaternary period, to a maximum age of 2.58 mya; deposits of the same group make up higher parts of Streatham up to Crown Lane. There are also Quaternary deposits of Head – poorly-sorted, slow-creep glacial hillwash – on the east and west slopes of the ridge either side of Crystal Palace Parade.

A 128.97-metre borehole was drilled at the Upper Terrace of Crystal Palace Park by Jubilee Gardens, just northeast of the junction of Crystal Palace Parade and Anerley Hill; the hole went through the superficial geology and Claygate beds almost to the base – below sea-level – of the London Clay formation in this area and was used to redefine boundaries between the geological layers.

== Human Geography ==
On the ridge where Westow Hill meets Crystal Palace Parade stood the 'Vicar's Oak' until the 17th century (remaining as a place-name until the 19th century) which indicated where the parishes of Lambeth, Croydon, Camberwell and an isolated part of Battersea met. At approximately the same crossroads location is where the modern London boroughs of Lambeth, Southwark, Bromley and Croydon meet; such a boundary has been problematic regarding the provision of local services and utilities. The largest area remaining of the original North Wood is Dulwich and Sydenham Hill Woods whose flora indicate ancient woodland. Dulwich Upper Wood also contains an ancient remnant. As with other areas of London, local clay was used to manufacture bricks, such as at the brickfields between Holmesdale Road and Whitehorse Lane and at Pascalls by the junction of South Norwood Hill and Norwood High Street.

The area was a recreational destination of Londoners travelling south; gipsies lived in parts of the wood on the ridge (preserved in local placenames). The ridge is associated with water engineering, springs and spas, such as the 'medicinal' springs which became popular for visitors from the 17th century onwards at Sydenham Wells Park, Streatham Village and Streatham Wells as well as the later Dulwich Wells, Beulah Spa, Biggin Hill Spring (at Biggin Wood) and Lady Well.

A reservoir, historically under control of Lambeth Water Works and the Metropolitan Water Board, latterly called Norwood Reservoir (not the older canal-linked reservoir of the same name) was built by the junction of Crown Lane and Beulah Hill between 1868 and 1890; it was linked to Streatham Pumping Station (now part of the Thames Water Ring Main). There were also two reservoirs at the same time at Crystal Palace Park. An underground reservoir at Honor Oak is also part of the Ring Main operation.

The top of the ridge is above 100 metres for a distance of well over 2 kilometres, becoming a transmission site for telecommunications in the South East. Television pioneer John Logie Baird moved his workshops to under the main transept of the Crystal Palace, with the transmitter on its south water tower. The workshops were destroyed by fire along with the Palace in 1936, but his studio survived and he continued transmissions until WWII, during which the tower was demolished to prevent the Luftwaffe using it as a landmark. In 1955, the Croydon transmitting station, originally a lattice tower formation, was built at Beaulieu Heights, by South Norwood Hill. A few months later, the 219-metre Crystal Palace transmitting station was completed for the BBC on the former site of The Aquarium on Crystal Palace Parade. The Croydon transmitter was replaced by the current 152-metre tower in 1962, originally used for ITA transmissions. Both towers are now owned and operated by Arqiva.

== See also ==
- Great North Wood of which the Norwood Ridge formed a large minority.
