= The Mental Traveller =

William Blake poem

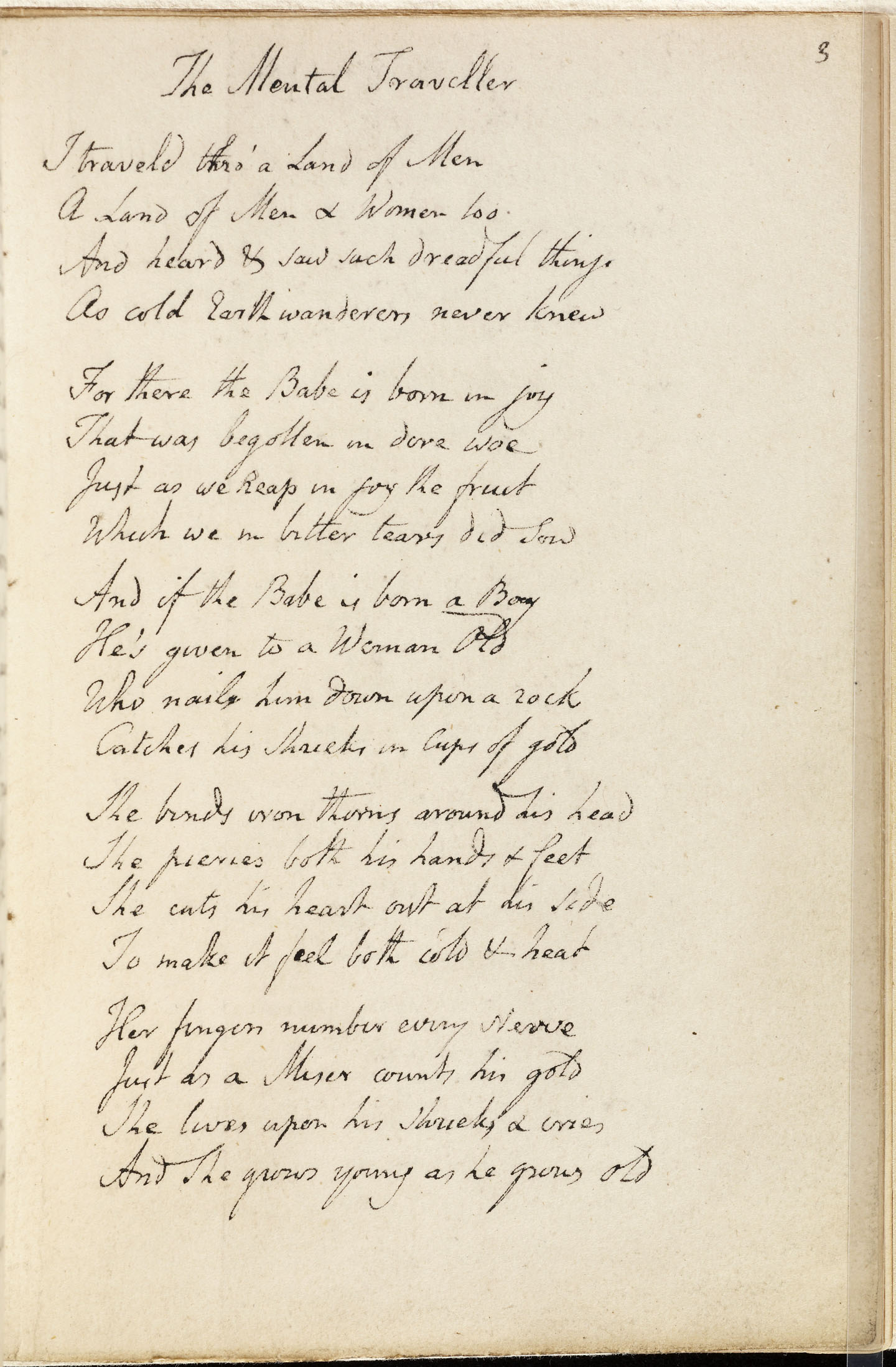
The Mental Traveller, Blake's Manuscript (c. 1803)

"The Mental Traveller" is a poem by William Blake. It is part of a collection of unpublished works called The Pickering Manuscript and was written in a manner that suggests the poem was to be read directly from the collection.

The poem is about travelling in the realm of the mind. Blake generalizes here "about the spiritual history of mankind out the experience of his own spiritual history." It can be also understood as a cycle history of relations between society and idea of liberty in the form of a male and female that grow older and younger in opposition to the other experiencing such changes. As a whole, the poem portrays conflicting ideas that make it difficult for the reader to attach to any given viewpoint.

== Background ==
"The Mental Traveller" was not etched, printed or published by Blake and instead stayed as a manuscript. The poem was part of The Pickering Manuscript, a collection of 10 poems without illustrations and 8 are fair copies without corrections. Since they were written in this manner, they were copied into the manuscript in order to be read from the collection. The manuscript was owned by B. M. Pickering in 1866, for which the manuscript receives its name. It was published for the first time in 1863 in the 2nd volume of Alexander Gilchrist's Life of William Blake, Pictor ignotus, p. 98-102, by Dante Gabriel Rossetti with the commentary of his brother William Michael Rossetti.

The poem was later translated multiple times. The September 1925 issue of the French magazine Navire focused on Blake and included a series of translations by Auguste Morel and Annie Hervieu which included a translation of the poem called "Le Voyageur mental". Later, "The Mental Traveller" was translated by Pablo Neruda into Spanish and published in 1935 in Visiones de las hijas de Albión y El viajero mental, de William Blake.

== Poem ==
Hirsch considers the best comment on the universal implication of the poem is one of the earliest, written by W. M. Rossetti (1863):

"The Mental Traveller indicates an explorer of mental phænomena. The mental phænomenon here symbolized seems to be the career of any great Idea or intellectual movement—as, for instance, Christianity, chivalry, art, &c.—represented as going through the stages of—1. birth, 2. adversity and persecution, 3. triumph and maturity, 4. decadence through over-ripeness, 5. gradual transformation, under new conditions, into another renovated Idea, which again has to pass through all the same stages. In other words, the poem represents the action and re-action of Ideas upon society, and of society upon Ideas."

There are 26 stanzas in the poem. The 1st one introduces the reader into the disturbing and even tragic realm of the mind or spirit, the land of Men and Women whose sexual distinction suggests also “the distinction between different sorts of spiritual ideals”:

I traveld thro' a Land of Men
A Land of Men & Women too
And heard & saw such dreadful things
As cold Earth wanderers never knew (lines 1–4)

The “cold Earth wanderers” who in their “Newton’s sleep” and the concerns of the physical world "are not aware of man's tragic spiritual history" seen by the poet, “an Olympian observer of the human spirit” and wanderer in its realm. The 2nd stanza explains the difference between the two realms. Here "the Babe is born in joy / That was begotten in dire woe", which is the opposite to natural phenomena. So, "the Idea, conceived with pain, is born amid enthusiasm." Damon considers this is the idea of Liberty:

For there the Babe is born in joy
That was begotten in dire woe
Just as we Reap in joy the fruit
Which we in bitter tears did Sow (lines 5–8)

Here is a paraphrase of Psalm 126:5: "They that sow in tears shall reap in joy." The 3rd stanza is the beginning the first story. "If of masculine, enduring nature, it falls under the control and ban of the already existing state of society (the woman old)." Blake, within "The Mental Traveller" and other poems, returns to the Elizabethan reliance on metaphor, especially when he says:

And if the Babe is born a Boy
He's given to a Woman Old
Who nails him down upon a rock
Catches his Shrieks in Cups of gold (lines 9–12)

The “woman old” represents the earth, old fallen world that opposes to the new ideas, but the purpose of the “newborn boy” is to renew it, he is a new spiritual or religious ideal. So, "the old woman is therefore the type of the religious persecutor and also the type of fallenness and corruption." His persecution has the allusion to Prometheus, Jesus Christ as well as Dionysus, because old woman "nails him down upon a rock", and in the 4th stanza she "binds iron thorns around his head", "pierces both his hands & feet", and "cuts his heart out":

She binds iron thorns around his head
She pierces both his hands & feet
She cuts his heart out at his side
To make it feel both cold & heat (lines 13–16)

In the 5th stanza "Her fingers number every Nerve / Just as a Miser counts his gold." While crucified, the old woman is able to be healed. W. M. Rossetti commented: "As the Idea develops, the old society becomes moulded into a new society (the old woman grows young)":

Her fingers number every Nerve
Just as a Miser counts his gold
She lives upon his shrieks & cries
And She grows young as he grows old (lines 17–20)

In the 6th stanza the "purpose is accomplished", the world seems to be redeemed and "the terrestrial paradise has arrived":

Till he becomes a bleeding youth
And She becomes a Virgin bright
Then he rends up his Manacles
And binds her down for his delight (lines 21–24)

Stanza 7. Now the idea becomes free and dominant. It united to society in a sort of matrimony:

He plants himself in all her Nerves
Just as a Husbandman his mould
And She becomes his dwelling place
And Garden fruitful Seventy fold (lines 25–28)

Stanza 8. "It gradually grows old and effete, living now only upon the spiritual treasures laid up in the days of its early energy." The protagonist is "wandering round" without faith or goal, he lost his ideal:

An aged Shadow soon he fades
Wandring round an Earthly Cot
Full filled all with gems & gold
Which he by industry had got (lines 29–32)

Stanza 9. With a deep melancholy he looks at all his riches: the jewels of his soul and gold of his heart, which are the products of his creative activity, and probably, Blake means also there are the works of his own art. This seems to be a self-biographical detail, and it perhaps is that “Deep pit of Melancholy” that Blake reported in the letter to George Cumberland on the 2nd of July 1800:

And these are the gems of the Human Soul
The rubies & pearls of a lovesick eye
The countless gold of the akeing heart
The martyrs groan & the lovers sigh (lines 33–36)

Stanza 10. "These still subserve many purposes of practical good, and outwardly the Idea is in its most flourishing estate, even when sapped at its roots": The works of his art are "his meat and drink", and he feeds with this spiritual nourishment others: "Beggar & the Poor", as well as some "wayfaring Traveller":

They are his meat they are his drink
He feeds the Beggar & the Poor
And the way faring Traveller
For ever open is his door (lines 37–40)

Stanza 11. W. M. Rossetti continued: "The halo of authority and tradition, or prestige, gathering round the Idea, is symbolized in the resplendent babe born on his hearth."

His grief is their eternal joy
They make the roofs & walls to ring
Till from the fire on the hearth
A little Female Babe does spring (lines 41–44)

As Damon stated, "from his own hospitality (the fire on his hearth) was born his Negation, the Female Babe," which is Intolerance, the "false church, Mistery of Babylon," whom Blake often called Rahab. Hirsch suggest a different reading. At the moment the Nameless Female is already disappeared, because the protagonist "is no longer concerns with Earth", and sees "a tragic and meaningless inevitability in the historical cycle of human religious ideas". So, a female babe symbolizes a spiritual ideal "born out of the ruins of earthly hopes", and "has nothing to do with the Woman old.". And the 12th stanza explains that she "is all of solid Fire and gems & gold", and nothing earthly can touch the Babe that sprung "from the fire of creative intellect":

And she is all of solid Fire
And gems & gold that none his hand
Dares to stretch to touch her Baby form
Or wrap her in his swaddling-band (lines 45–48)

Stanza 13. "This prestige deserts the Idea itself, and attaches to some individual, who usurps the honour due only to the Idea (as we may see in the case of papacy, royalty, &c.); and the Idea is eclipsed by its own very prestige, and assumed living representative."

But She comes to the Man she loves
If young or old or rich or poor
They soon drive out the aged Host
A Beggar at anothers door (lines 49–52)

In stanza 14 the aged homeless weeping man wanders again, but no longer round the old ruins of his earthly cot. He is far away, in exile, seeking for some different faith that can renew him ("until he can a maiden win"):

He wanders weeping far away
Until some other take him in
Oft blind & age-bent sore distrest
Until he can a Maiden win (lines 53–56)

Stanza 15. Hirsch suggests that the maiden is the little female babe that has grown up, and "at their first embrace, the old, earthly ideal totally vanishes" (the Cottage, Garden and its lovely Charms fade before his sight):

And to allay his freezing Age
The Poor Man takes her in his arms
The Cottage fades before his sight
The Garden & its lovly Charms (lines 57–60)

Stanza 16–17. Other men, the Guest on Earth, also disappeared because his "Eye altering alters all". In a similar way Blake's eye was altered by his "stupid Melancholy" and he confessed to Cumberland: "I hid myself... I neglect my Duty to my friends". All his senses were altered and he could see only "a dark desert all around":

The Guests are scatterd thro' the land
For the Eye altering alters all
The Senses roll themselves in fear
And the flat Earth becomes a Ball

The stars sun moon all shrink away
A desart vast without a bound
And nothing left to eat or drink
And a dark desart all around (lines 61–68)

W. M. Rossetti explains that in stanza 18 the old Idea is "beguiled to infancy" and "becomes a new Idea, in working upon a fresh community, and under altered conditions."

The honey of her Infant lips
The bread & wine of her sweet smile
The wild game of her roving Eye
Does him to Infancy beguile (lines 69–72)

Stanza 19. Attracted by her beauty and sexuality, he "eats & drinks" the "bread & wine" of her smile and eye, becoming "younger & younger every day":

For as he eats & drinks he grows
Younger & younger every day
And on the desart wild they both
Wander in terror & dismay (lines 73–76)

Stanza 20. But they are not together, she "like the wild Stag" flees away while he pursues. "Her fear plants many a thicket wild", and she "by various arts of Love beguiled", so she is "increasingly sinister" and "coyly flirtatious":

Like the wild Stag she flees away
Her fear plants many a thicket wild
While he pursues her night & day
By various arts of Love beguild (lines 77–80)

Stanza 21. They are coming into the labyrinths of wayward, wanton, immoral Love, "where roams the Lion Wolf & Boar", however it makes the world habitable:

By various arts of Love & Hate
Till the wide desart planted oer
With Labyrinths of wayward Love
Where roams the Lion Wolf & Boar (lines 81–84)

Stanza 22 returns us to the first state of the case. "The Idea starts upon a new course—is a babe; the society it works upon has become an old society—no longer a fair virgin, but an aged woman."

Till be becomes a wayward Babe
And she a weeping Woman Old
Then many a Lover wanders here
The Sun & Stars are nearer rolld (lines 85–88)

Stanza 23. This describes "the momentary fulfillment of the female ideal". This spiritual domain of the pastoral Blake called Beulah:

The trees bring forth sweet Extacy
To all who in the desart roam
Till many a City there is Built
And many a pleasant Shepherds home (lines 89–92)

The finale is full of the negative imagery of Blake's poetry of the 1790s. In 24-25th stanzas "the Idea seems so new and unwonted that, the nearer it is seen, the more consternation it excites." The newborn Babe is frowning and frightening, "corresponding to the repressions of the Urizenic order":

But when they find the frowning Babe
Terror strikes thro the region wide
They cry the Babe the Babe is Born
And flee away on Every side

For who dare touch the frowning form
His arm is witherd to its root
Lions Bears Wolves all howling flee
And every Tree does shed its fruit (lines 93–100)

Stanza 26. So, "at the end, he is the Babe again, and she is a Woman old, 'and all is done as I have told'". And anyone "who dare touch the frowning form" will be punished except the Woman Old who "nails him down upon the Rock". But all this is only the part of the cycle that will be repeated again and again.

And none can touch that frowning form
Except it be a Woman Old
She nails him down upon the Rock
And all is done as I have told (lines 101–104)

W. M. Rossetti summarizes: "None can deal with the Idea so as to develop it to the full, except the old society with which it comes into contact; and this can deal with it only by misusing it at first, whereby (as in the previous stage, at the opening of the poem) it is to be again disciplined into ultimate triumph." The conclusion of Hirsh is that "Beulah has turned into Priestcraft, as it has to, because the spiritual ideal always collapses into 'State Religion'".

== Themes ==
According to Damon, the main focus within the poem is the development of liberty. Blake describes how liberty is established and disappears in a cyclical manner. The old woman within the poem represents society, the opposite to liberty. She crucifies liberty, a theme similar to what happens to Blake's character Orc, but liberty does break free and joins with her and they are able to enjoy plenty. However, they have a child, which represents the false church, an idea similar to Blake's character Rahab.

Stevenson suggests that the poem operates in a cycle of conflicts between the sexes that cause many problems. In general, the poem is filled with a mixture of conflicting views that keeps the reader from being sentimentally attached to any viewpoints. This is reinforced by his grammatical structure of the poem in which the sense of words are both made and unmade. The ballads of the Pickering Manuscript, according to Northrop Frye, were intended "to explore the relationship between innocence and experience instead of merely presenting their contrast as the two engraved sets do". This idea is most true about "The Mental Traveller" and "Auguries of Innocence".

== Critical response ==
D. G. Rossetti, who published "The Mental Traveller" in 1863, at first regarded the poem "as a hopeless riddle", and confessed "to having been on the point of omitting it, in spite of its high poetic beauty, as incomprehensible". However W. M. Rossetti persuaded his brother to include the poem into the collection providing a commentary, "the clear-sighted, and no doubt correct, exposition which is now printed with it, and brings its full value to light.".":

In an 1888 review called "Personal Peculiarities" in The London Standard, the reviewer claims that the poem "sounds like poetry, but it is the work of one writing by ear and ignoring all sense and meaning, like the tyro's first chaotic attempt to compose an oratorio. In the one case the obscurity comes from a too greater number of ideas, in the other from an almost total lack of these necessary articles.

In a 1922 review on Percy Shelley, the pseudonymous reviewer states "We learn more of the essence of [Blake's] soul-structure from 'Tiger, Tiger', 'The Crystal Cabinet', or 'The Mental Traveller' than we do from his professedly 'prophetic' books. The English language, as understood by scholars and developed by them, is an instrument of doubtful value to the poet."

In 1990, Birdsall S. Viault argued that Blake "demonstrated his imaginative, sensitive, and mystical genius in such poems as "The Lamb, The Tiger", and "The Mental Traveller"."

== Manuscript ==
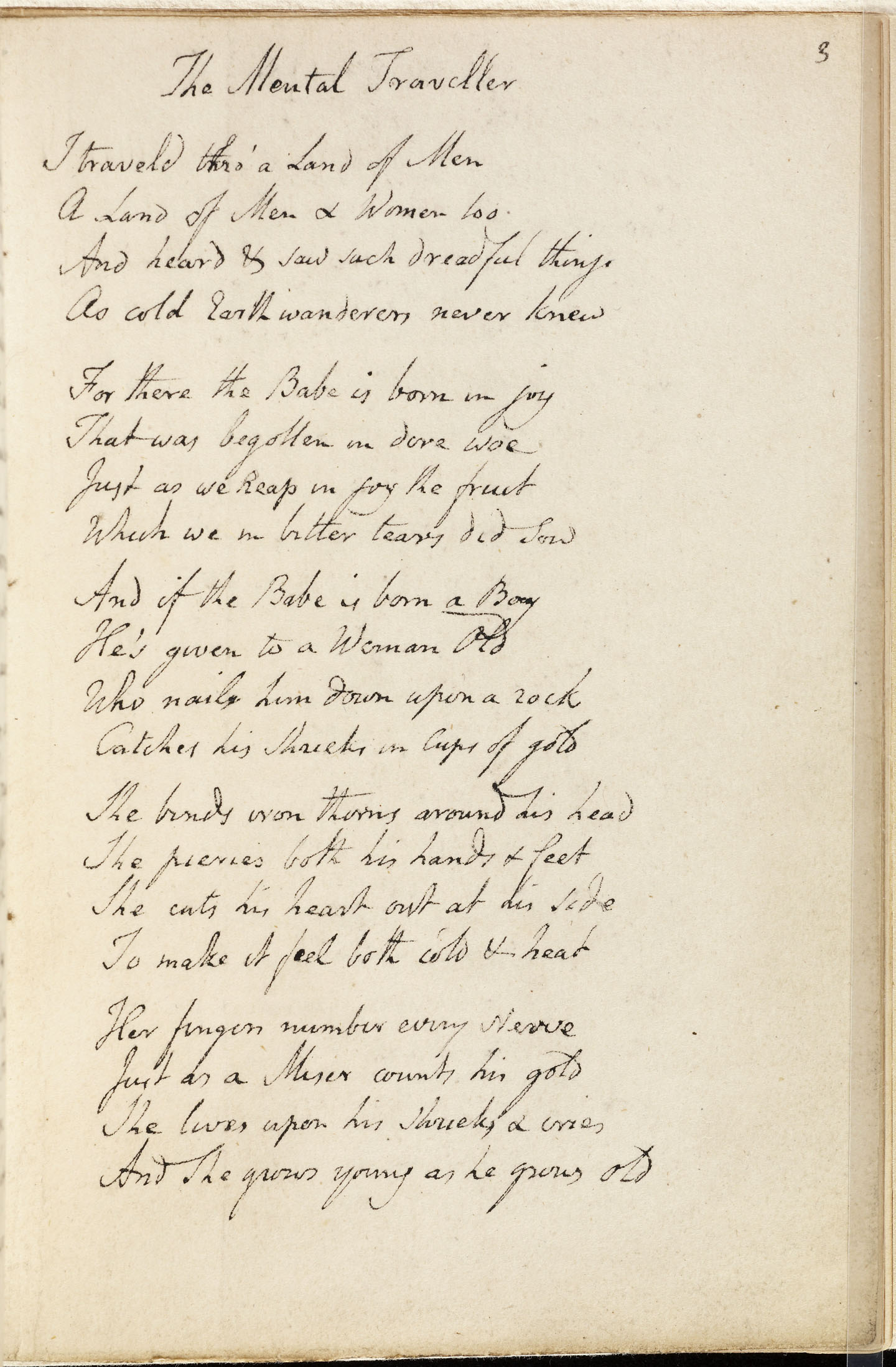
Mental Traveller 1

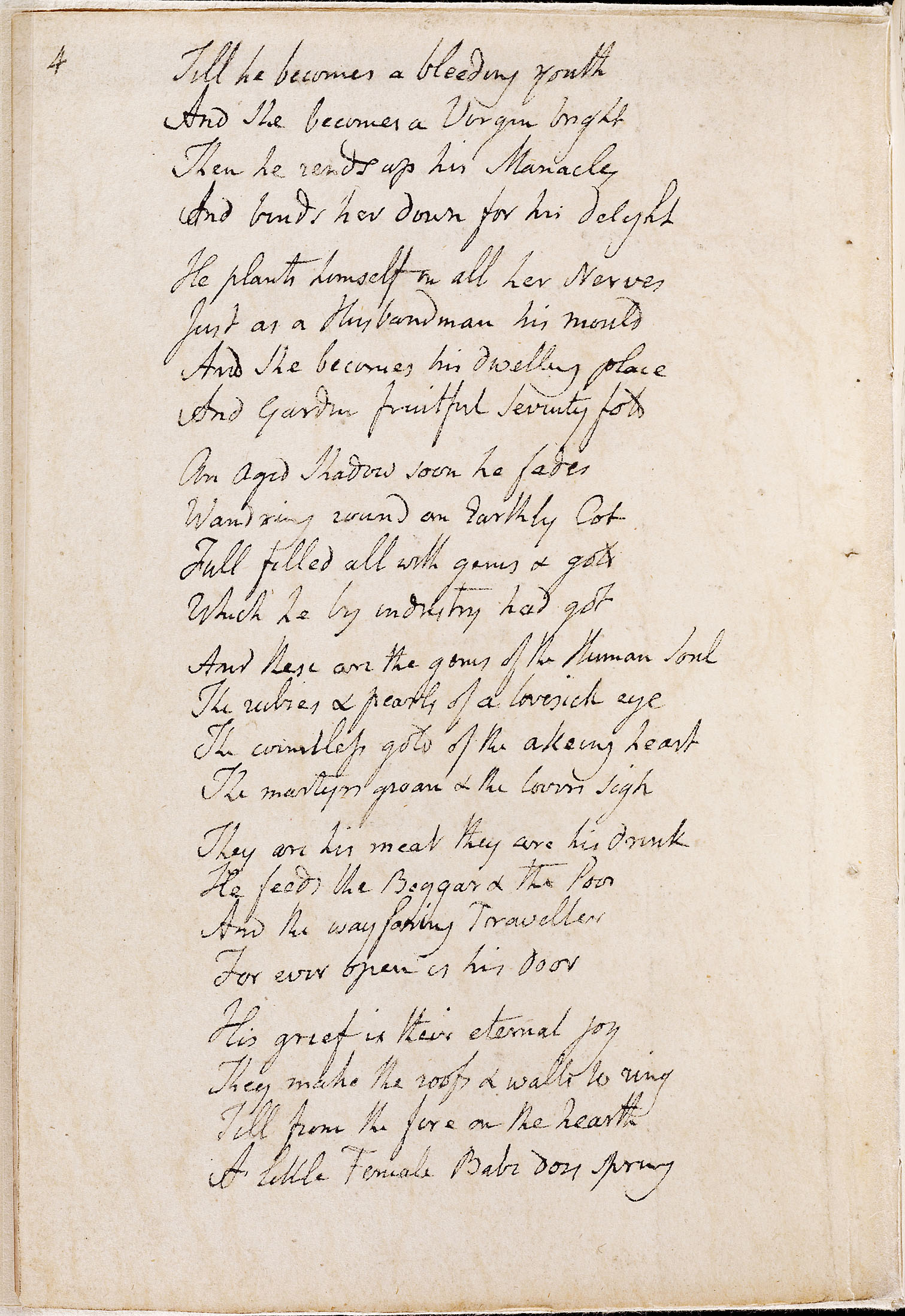
Mental Traveller 2

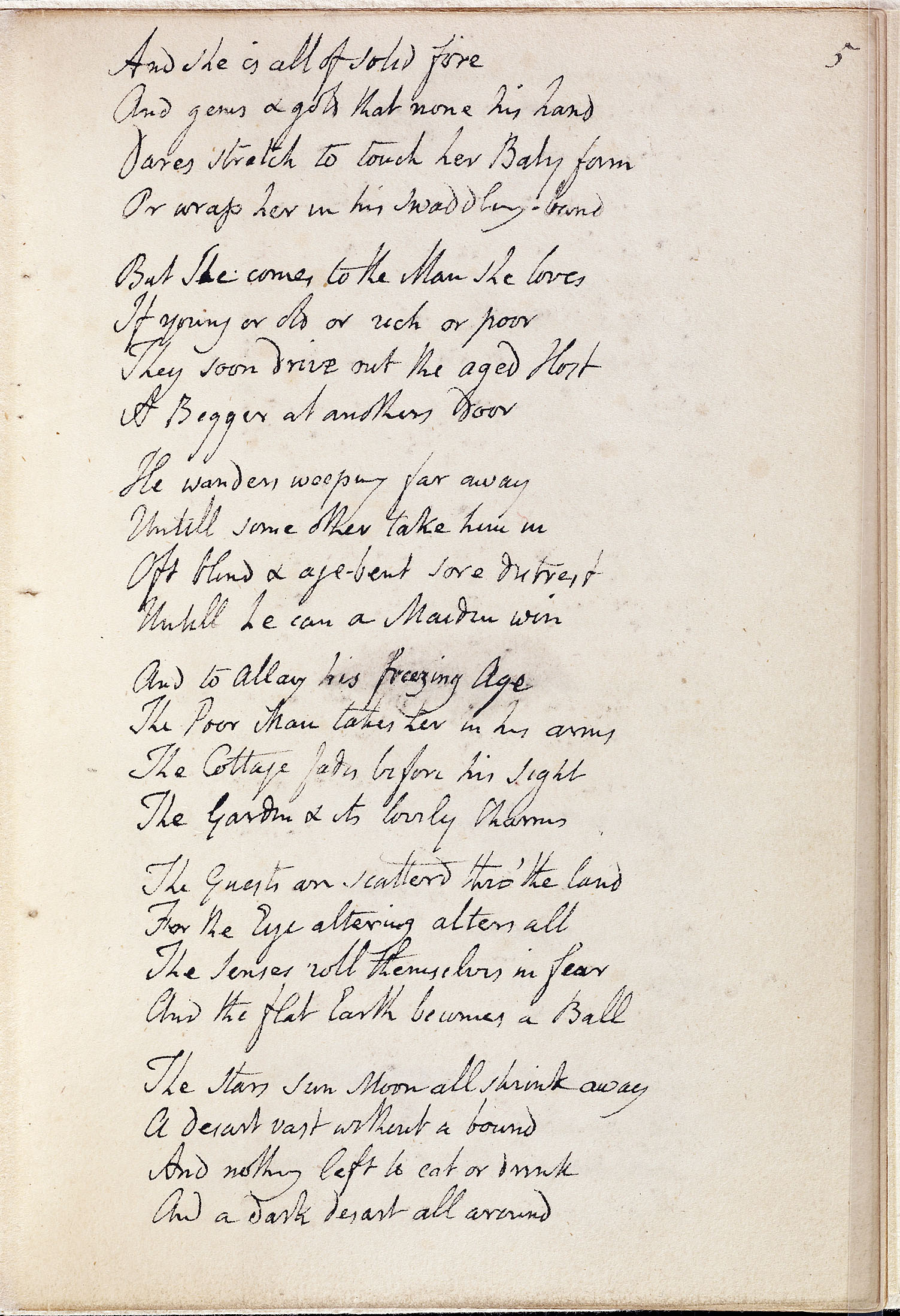
Mental Traveller 3

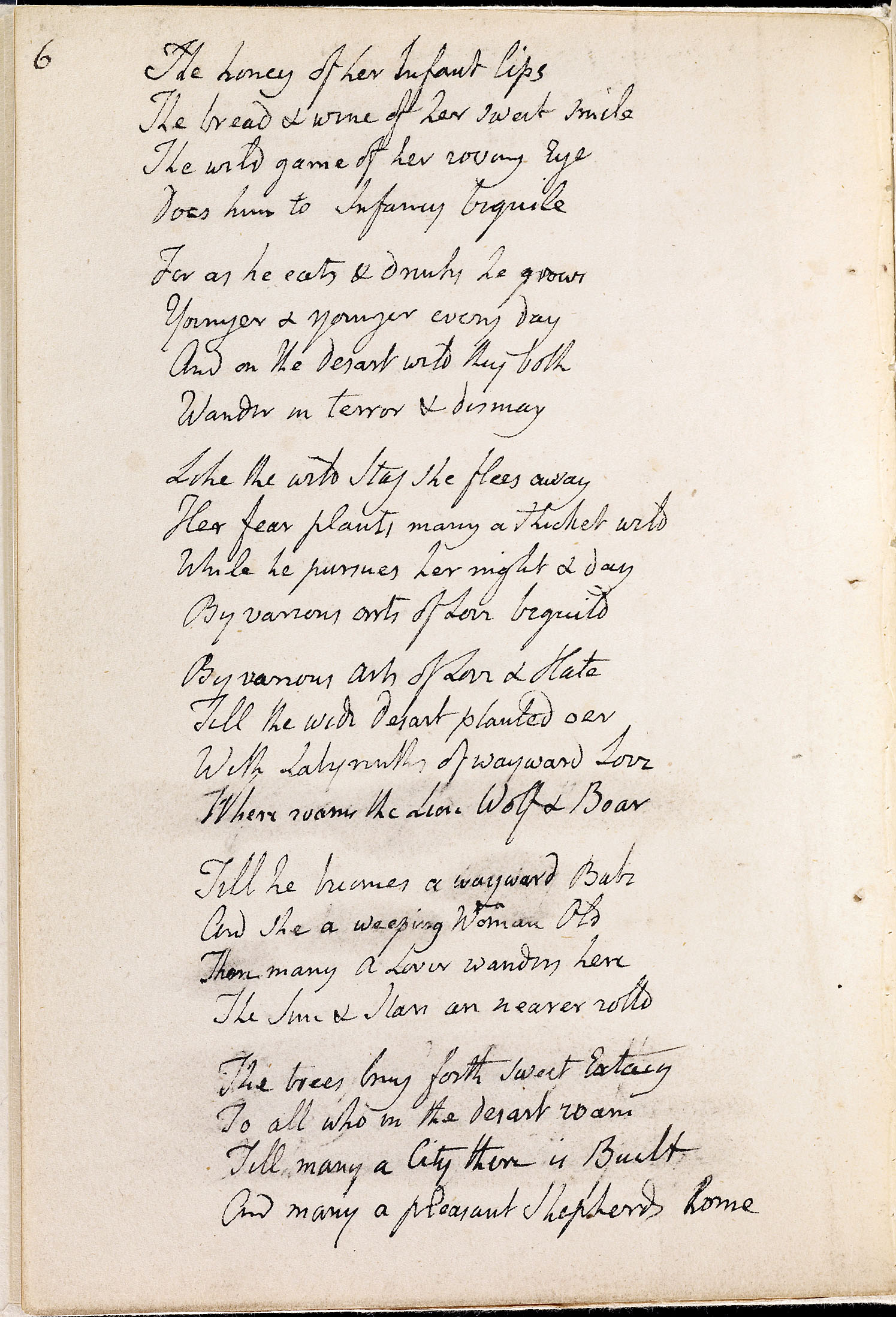
Mental Traveller 4

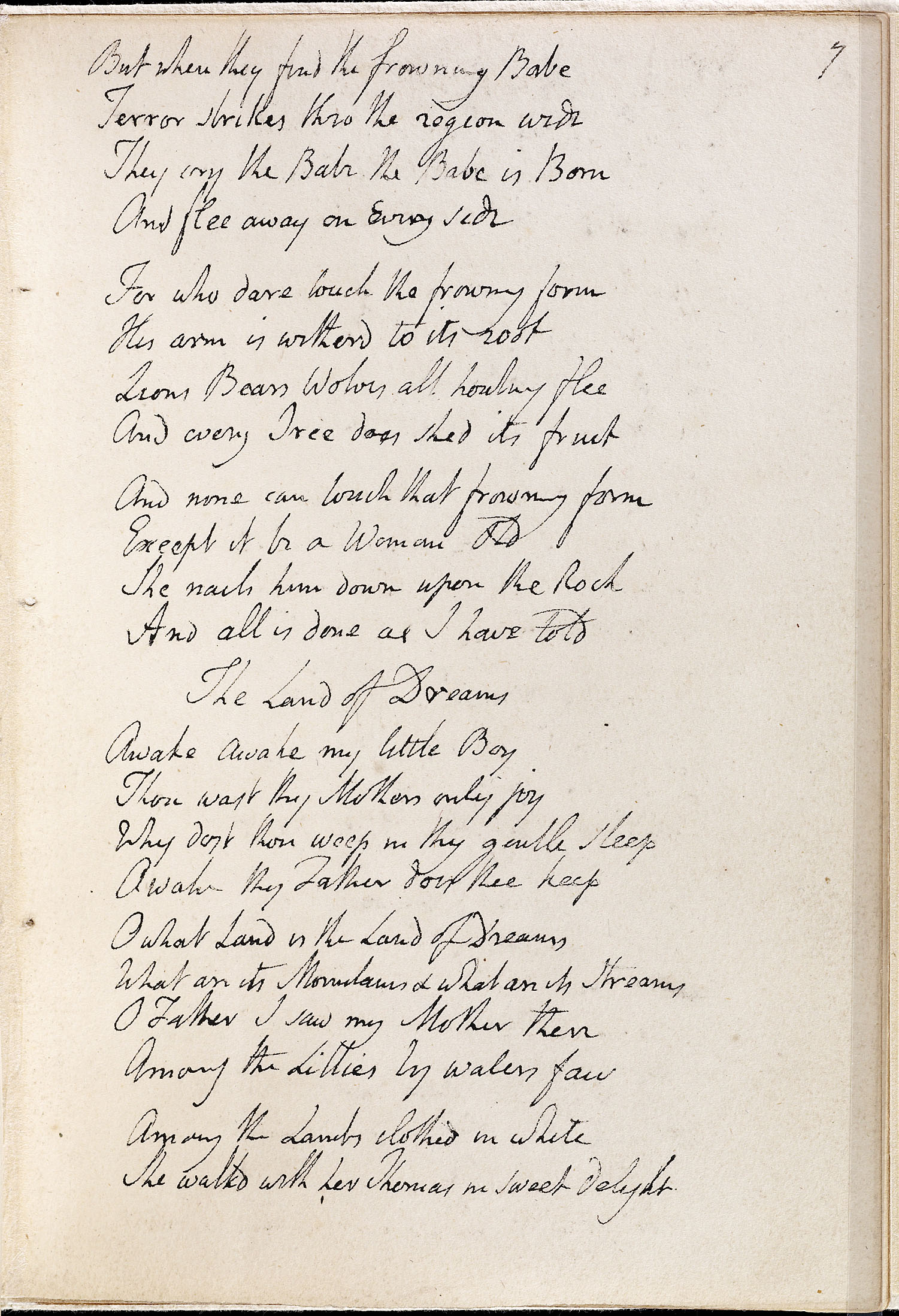
Mental Traveller 5
