= Convent Wood =

Coordinates: 51.4203°N 0.09725°W

Convent Wood is a small area of ancient woodland in the London Borough of Croydon. The wood is in the freehold of the Sisters of Our Lady of Fidelity. Some of the grounds are leased to The Ceadars School and The Laurels School. The woods are not accessible to the public except by appointment with the Sisters on weekends only. The New School use part of the woods as a classroom forest school in the week. The wood was a part of the Great North Wood and is now managed by the London Wildlife Trust as a part of the Great North Wood Project. The wood is home to a range of British wildlife species including English oak, European hornbeam, great spotted woodpecker, European green woodpecker and European holly.
