= Crystal Palace transmitting station =

Telecommunications site in Bromley, England

Arqiva Crystal Palace
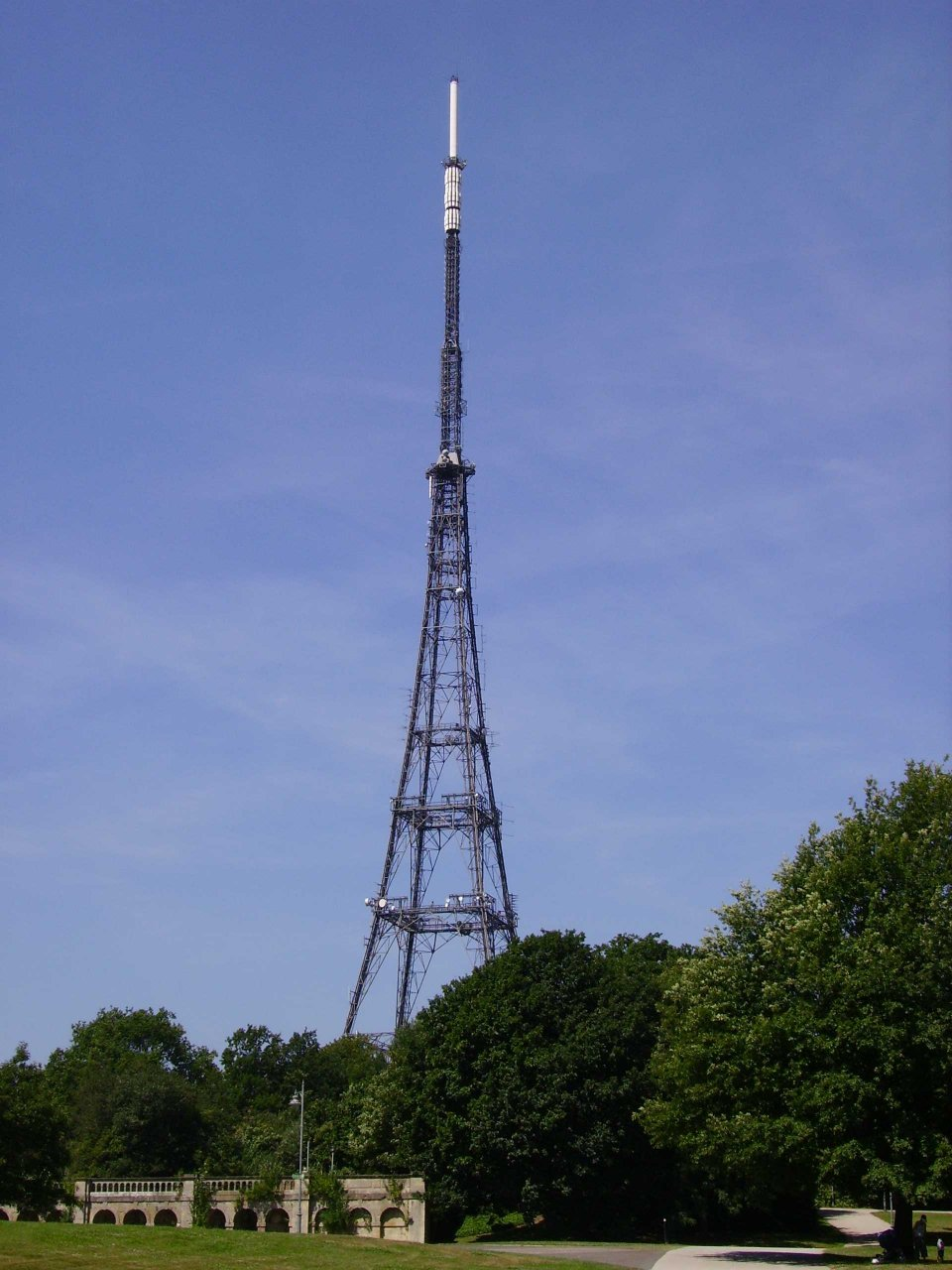

- Location within Greater London
- Tower height: 219 metres (719 ft)
- Coordinates: 51.4242°N 0.0750°W
- Built: 28 March 1956
- BBC region: BBC London
- ITV region: ITV London
- Local TV service: London Live

The Crystal Palace transmitting station, officially known as Arqiva Crystal Palace, is a broadcasting and telecommunications site in the Crystal Palace area of the London Borough of Bromley, England (grid reference TQ339712). It is located on the site of the former television station and transmitter operated by John Logie Baird from 1933.

The tower itself is the eighth-tallest structure in London, and is best known as the main television transmitter for the Greater London area and parts of the surrounding Home Counties. As such, it is the most important transmitter in the UK in terms of population covered. The transmitter is owned and operated by Arqiva. Given the transmitter's location on top of a 109-metre (358 ft) hill, it is the highest structure above sea level in London making it the highest overall point in London.

== History and development ==
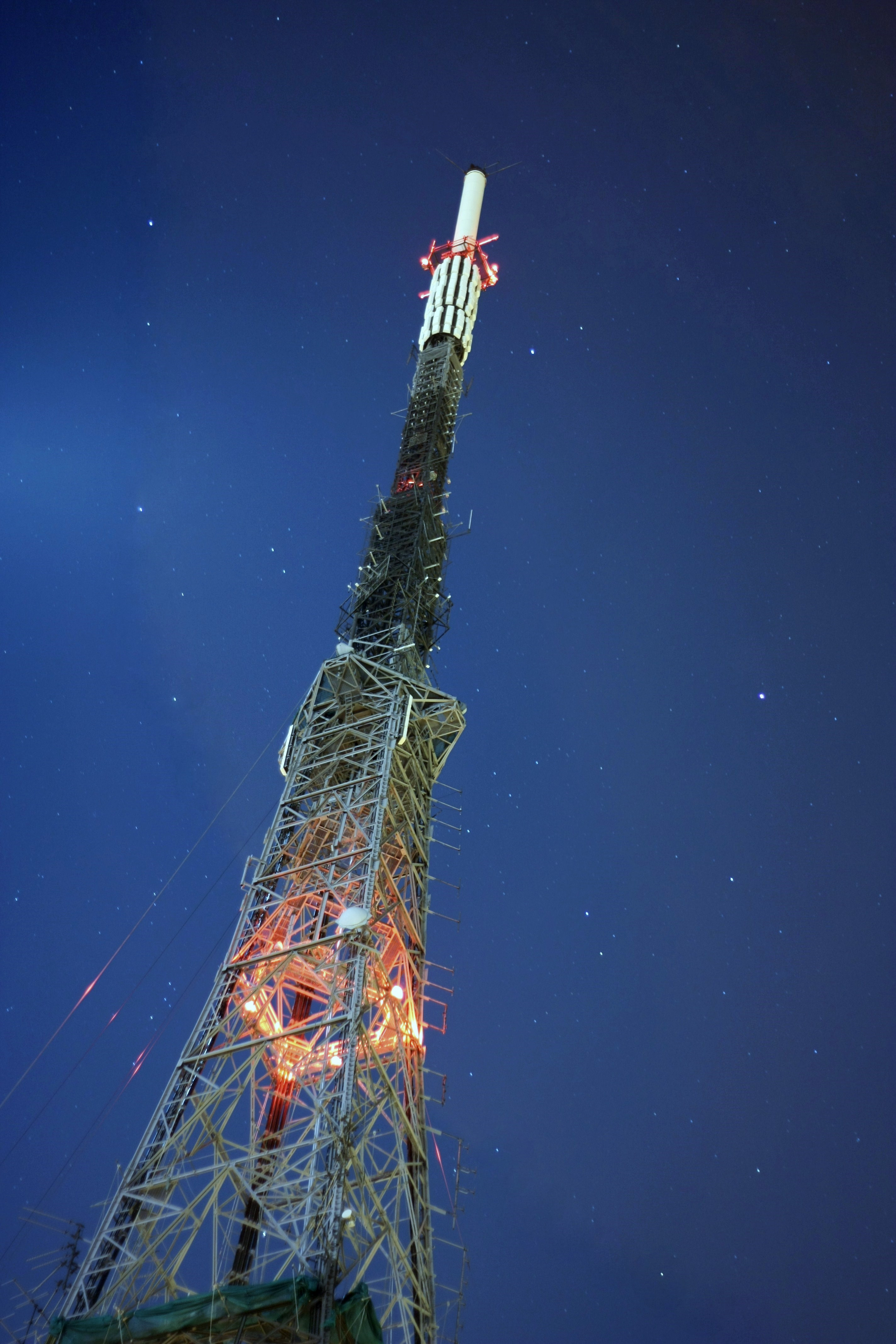
At night

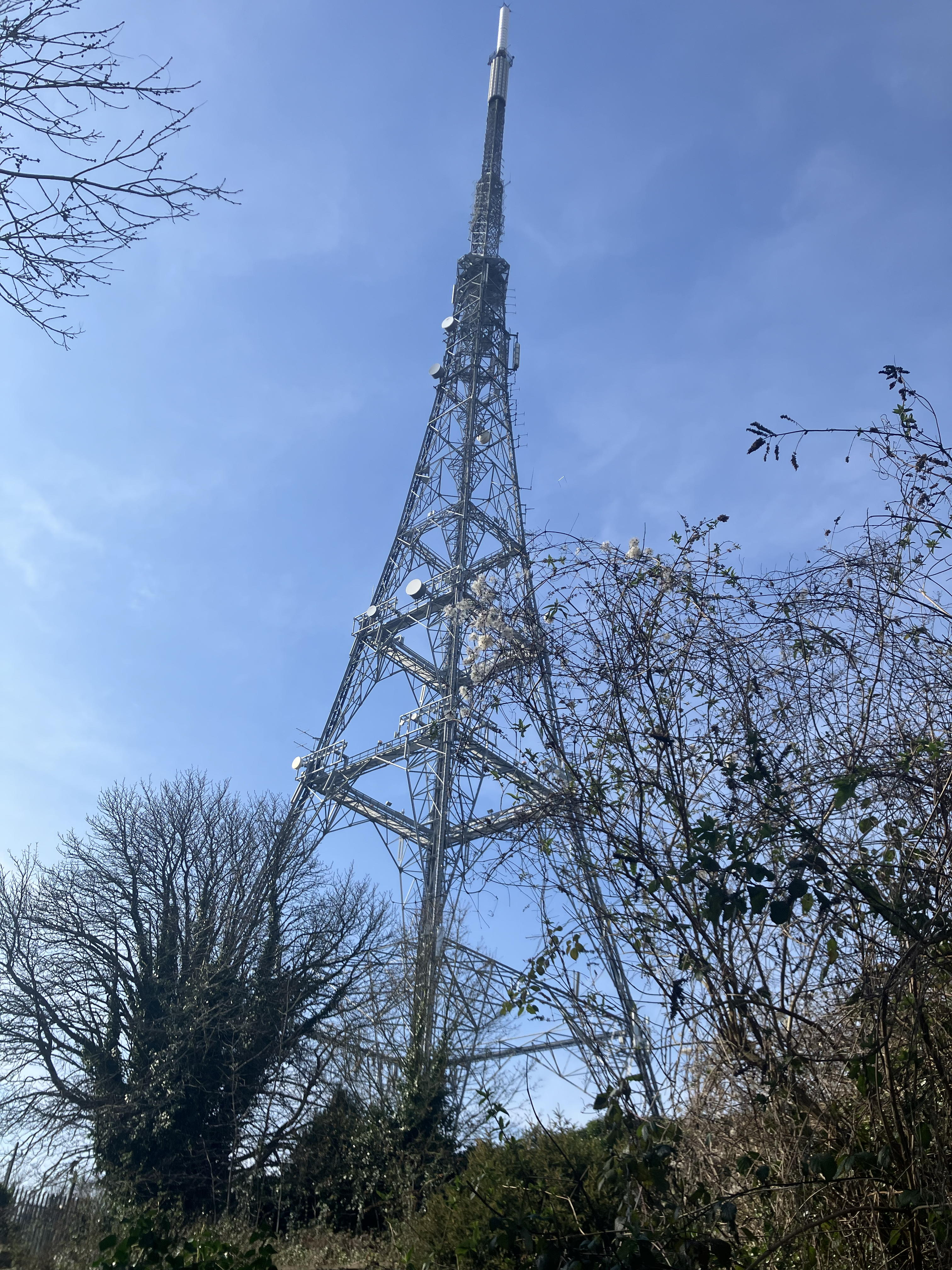
Crystal Palace transmitter mast as seen from Old Cople Lane adjacent to the remains of the aquarium.

The station was constructed in the mid-1950s among the ruins of the Crystal Palace. The Aquarium on whose site it stands was destroyed in 1941 during the demolition of the Palace's north water tower. (John Logie Baird's earlier transmitter and TV studios were a separate development at the other end of the Palace and perished with it in 1936.) Its new 219-metre (719 ft) tower was the tallest structure in London until the topping-out of One Canada Square at Canary Wharf in 1990.

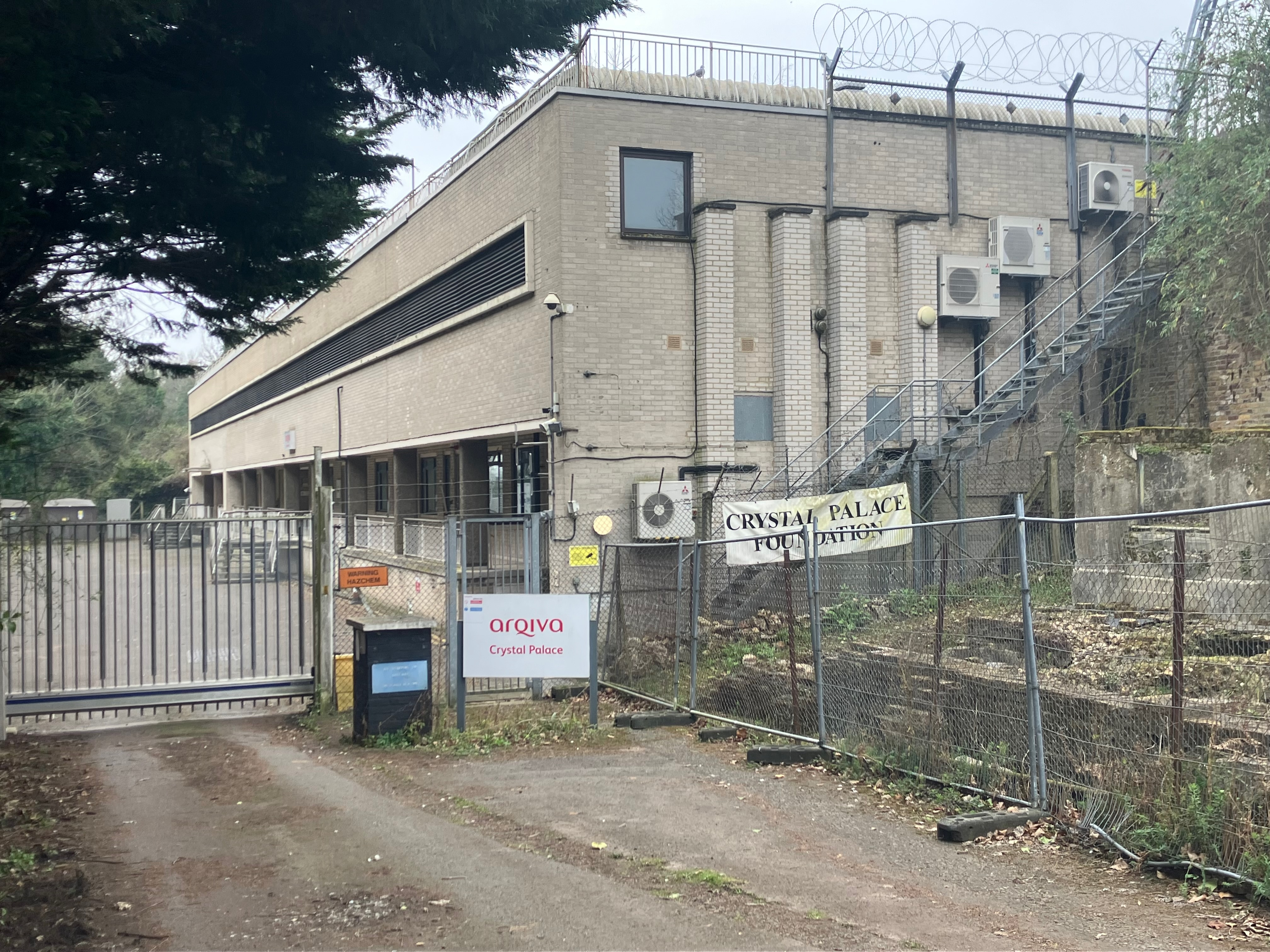
Arqiva transmitting station Crystal Palace

The first transmission from Crystal Palace took place on 28 March 1956, when it succeeded the transmitter at Alexandra Palace where the BBC had started the world's first scheduled television service in November 1936. In November 1956 the first colour test transmissions began from Crystal Palace, relaying live pictures from the studios at Alexandra Palace after BBC TV had closed down for the night. In May 1958 the first experimental Band V 625-line transmissions started from Crystal Palace.

This tower was designed and built for BBC by British Insulated Callender's Construction Co. Ltd., with steelwork fabrication by Painter Brothers Ltd. of Hereford. The tower was required to transmit television programmes with good reception in 1957, and has a total height of 708 feet (216 m). The base of the tower is 120 feet (37 m) to a side, and it rises in twelve diminishing panels to a 14.5 feet (4.4 m) square platform at a height of 429 feet (131 m). The tower was constructed using two masts as derricks, one 230 feet (70 m) and the other 125 feet (38 m) high, in conjunction with a winch. At the time, a 16mm film of the construction by BICC was produced; "The Phoenix Tower - The Story of the Crystal Palace Television Tower" was available on loan from the BICC Film Library and has been released on the DVD "The Pleasure Garden" from the BFI.

=== Innovations ===
The transmitter was the first in the UK to broadcast (experimentally) on 625 lines (UHF) in 1962–1964, which it did on Channel 44, using a modified version of the SMPTE optical monochrome test card (not to be confused with the SMPTE colour bars).

On 18 July 1986, with the First Night of the Proms on BBC2, the transmitter became the first in the world to transmit stereophonic sound using the NICAM digital sound system.

=== Television ===
When built it transmitted BBC Television on the VHF 405-line system; the Croydon transmitter two miles away had been built some months earlier to broadcast ITV. When UHF transmissions started in 1964, first the new BBC2 and later (from 1969) both BBC 1 and ITV were transmitted from Crystal Palace. 405-line VHF television was discontinued at the start of 1985.

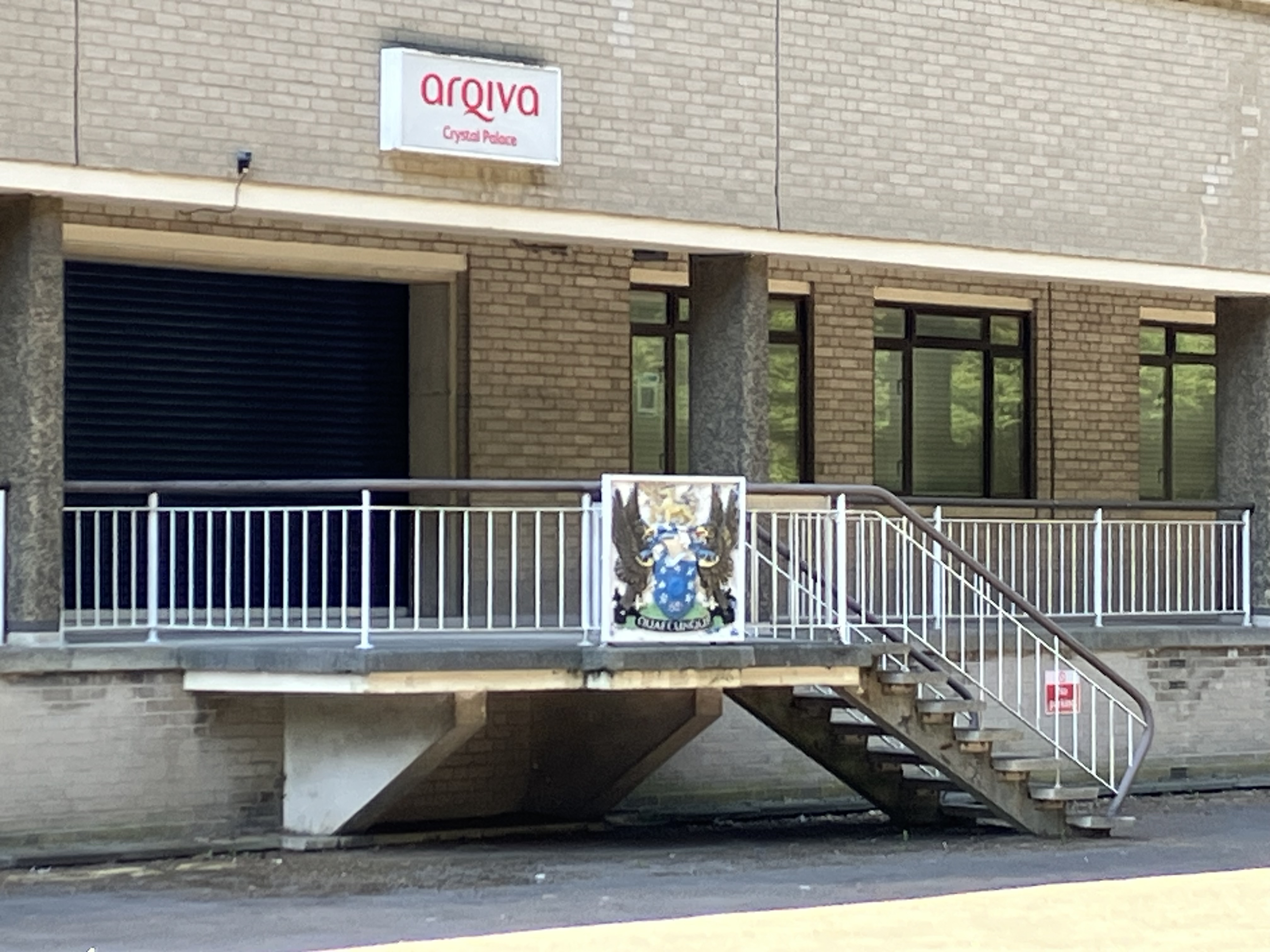
Stepped entrance to Crystal Palace Transmitting Station showing the original BBC coat of arms

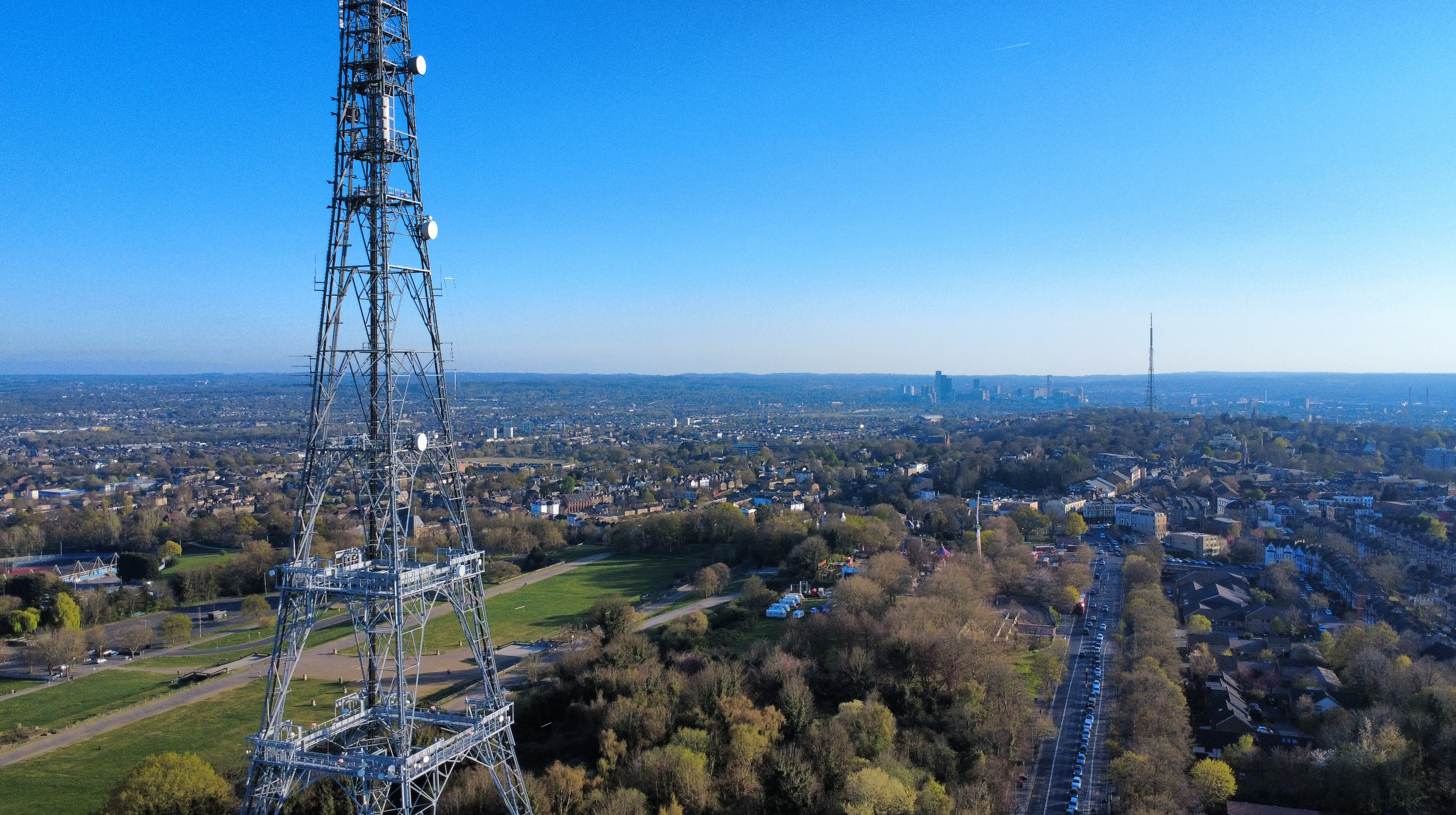
The Crystal Palace and Croydon (distant) towers aligned on the Norwood Ridge

The station carried the London regions of BBC One, BBC Two, ITV1 and Channel 4 in analogue, each with an effective radiated power of 1 MW, before digital switchover took place during April 2012, as well as all six digital terrestrial television multiplexes. These had an effective radiated power of 20 kW before switchover and 200 kW after, with considerable beam tilt to the south and east. With digital switchover completed all services come from Crystal Palace again, but because of the site's importance Croydon will be able to duplicate the PSB multiplexes in case of emergency. DTT requires less power to achieve the same coverage as analogue TV, hence the transmission powers have been reduced by 7 dB compared to analogue; however, the coverage range of approximately 60 miles (97 km) was expected to be largely similar post-switchover.

=== Radio ===
It is also used for FM radio transmission of local radio stations BBC Radio London, Radio X, Capital Xtra and Greatest Hits Radio London (which until March 2021 carried Absolute Radio), and a low-powered relay of the four BBC national FM services - Radio 1, Radio 2, Radio 3 and Radio 4, and Classic FM. It also has medium wave transmitters on 558 kHz (Panjab Radio)) and 1035 kHz (Lyca Gold). Since the tower is grounded, a wire aerial span close to it is used for the MW services.

Since 1995 the tower has been one of five London transmitters for the BBC DAB multiplex. This was joined in 1999 by the Digital One DAB service, and a further local DAB multiplex has since started transmitting, on behalf of the Klarna shopping channel.

BBC Radio 4's mediumwave frequencies from this transmitter ended on 15 April 2024 following a retune loop informing listeners to retune.

=== High definition ===
In May 2006 it began broadcasting the first terrestrial HDTV signals in the UK to a trial group of 450 London homes to test HD broadcasts by the BBC, ITV, Channel 4 and Channel 5, to assess the viability and potential problems of future nationwide HD broadcasting. On 2 December 2009 the site entered service as one of the first DVB-T2 transmitters in the world, carrying a variant of the BBC's Multiplex B broadcasting high-definition TV services.

=== Digital switchover ===
The Government's plans for digital switchover were based on the use of almost all current analogue TV transmitter sites. Crystal Palace remained a key part of the network after analogue was switched off in the London area in April 2012. In July 2007 it was confirmed by Ofcom that Crystal Palace would remain an A group transmitter after DSO (digital switchover). This was partially reversed with the 700 MHz Clearance that resulted in the use of Channels 55 and 56 for digital television both outside the A Group.

The transmitter is only one of two (the other being the ITV Granada transmitter at Winter Hill) that alone provides ITV and BBC services for the whole of their region, although still supported by the usual network of relays. Between opening in 1974 and January 1982, the main transmitter at Bluebell Hill broadcast ITV London signals to much of north and central Kent. However, the Independent Broadcasting Authority (IBA), the then regulator of commercial television, reorganised the ITV franchises which saw Bluebell Hill transferred to a new south and south-east dual-region of ITV (Television South – TVS), which took effect from 1 January 1982. Bluebell Hill now transmits ITV Meridian and BBC South East.

As one would expect for the largest transmitter in the country – by population coverage – Crystal Palace transmitter remained an A group, (which was its original analogue group) both during dual running (analogue and low-power pre-DSO digital) and full-power digital after DSO. However, in March 2018, during the transmitter's 700 MHz clearance, the temporary MUXES 7 and 8 were moved out of group to CH55 and CH56. Thus, reception of the latter two MUXES now requires a wideband or K group aerial. MUXES 7 and 8 were, however, due to be switched off sometime before 2023.

On 18 April 2012, a public lighting display was performed from the tower to mark the last day of analogue TV broadcasts from the transmitter.

=== Relay stations ===
The three most powerful relays are Reigate (covering a large area of south Surrey and northern areas of West Sussex), Guildford (for the Guildford area and parts of south west Surrey) and Hemel Hempstead (parts of Hertfordshire). There are also low-power relays situated across Greater London and also in parts of Kent, West Sussex, Surrey, Oxfordshire, Buckinghamshire and Hertfordshire.

== Channels listed by frequency ==
=== Analogue radio (AM medium wave) ===
Frequency	kW	Service
558 kHz	1	Panjab Radio
1035 kHz	2.5	Lyca Gold (moved to west London)

These frequencies were used by Lots Road until Tuesday 25 September 2001.

=== Analogue radio (FM VHF) ===
Frequency	kW	Service
88.8 MHz	4†	BBC Radio 2
91.0 MHz	4†	BBC Radio 3
93.2 MHz	4†	BBC Radio 4
94.9 MHz	4	BBC Radio London
96.9 MHz	0.03	Capital Xtra
98.5 MHz	4†	BBC Radio 1
100.6 MHz	2 (V)†	Classic FM
104.9 MHz	2.9	Radio X
105.8 MHz	3.73	Greatest Hits Radio London

† Relay of Wrotham.

=== Digital radio (DAB) ===
Frequency	Block	kW	Operator
213.360 MHz	10C	3	MuxCo Surrey & South London
216.928 MHz	11A	5.7	Sound Digital
222.064 MHz	11D	6.5	Digital One
223.936 MHz	12A	3	Switch London
225.648 MHz	12B	10	BBC National DAB

=== Digital television ===
==== After switchover ====
Frequency	UHF	kW	Operator	System
482.000 MHz	22	200	COM5 (ARQ A)	DVB-T
490.000 MHz	23	200	PSB1 (BBC A)	DVB-T
506.000 MHz	25	200	COM4 (SDN)	DVB-T
514.000 MHz	26	200	PSB2 (D3&4)	DVB-T
529.833 MHz	28−	200	COM6 (ARQ B)	DVB-T
545.833 MHz	30−	200	PSB3 (BBC B)	DVB-T2
586.000 MHz	35	30	LTVmux	DVB-T

==== Before switchover ====
Frequency	UHF	kW	Operator	System
481.833 MHz	22−	20	Digital 3&4 (Mux 2)	DVB-T
505.833 MHz	25−	20	BBC (Mux 1)	DVB-T
529.833 MHz	28−	20	BBC (Mux B)	DVB-T
537.833 MHz	29−	20	Arqiva (Mux D)	DVB-T
554.000 MHz	31	10	BBC B (Mux HD)	DVB-T2
561.833 MHz	32−	20	SDN (Mux A)	DVB-T
578.166 MHz	34+	20	Arqiva (Mux C)	DVB-T

=== Analogue television ===
|487.25 MHz ITV1 London |511.25 MHz BBC1 |543.25 MHz Channel 4 |567.25 MHz BBC2

Frequency	UHF	kW	Service
490.000 MHz	23	200	BBC A
567.25 MHz	33	1000	ITV London 4th of April 2012 to 18th of April 2012

== See also ==
- List of radio stations in the United Kingdom
- List of tallest buildings and structures in Great Britain
- List of tallest towers in the world
- List of famous transmission sites
- Radio masts and towers
- Lattice tower

== Bibliography ==
- Burns, R. W., British Television: The Formative Years, IET (1986), ISBN 0-86341-079-0
- Evans, R. H., The Crystal Palace FM filler experiment, British Broadcasting Corporation, Division of Engineering, Research and Development Department (1996), ASIN B0018RJ1ZY
