= Wrotham transmitting station =

Transmitting station in Kent, England

Wrotham
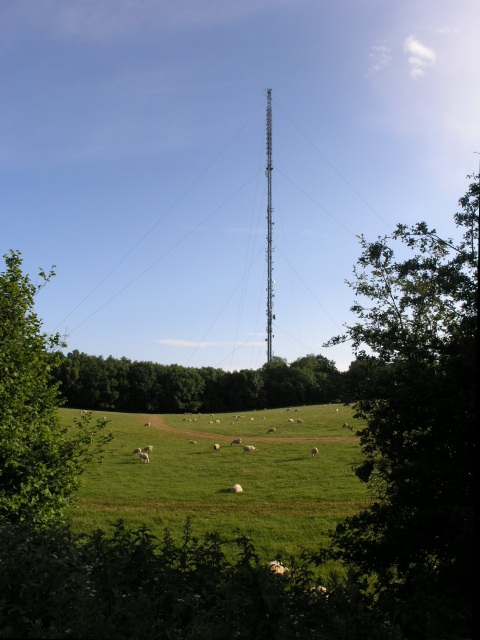

- Location within Kent
- Location: Wrotham, Kent
- Mast height: 176.6 metres (579 ft)
- Coordinates: 51.320727°N 0.287788°E
- Grid reference: TQ595604
- Built: 1951 (original); 1981 (current)

The Wrotham transmitting station is located on the North Downs, close to the village of Wrotham in Kent, England and just north of the M20 motorway. Its National Grid Reference is TQ595604. The current mast on the site was constructed in 1981, is 176.6 metres (579 ft) tall, and was built to replace the original mast of equal height that was constructed in 1951.

It is the main VHF FM transmitter for the national BBC radio networks in London and South East England. It currently transmits BBC Radio 1, 2, 3 & 4 and the independent national network Classic FM (125 kW ERP), BBC Radio Kent on 96.7 MHz (4.4 kW ERP) and KMFM West Kent on 101.6 MHz (0.2 kW ERP). (There are two prominent towers in the south of Greater London, Croydon and Crystal Palace, which provide a medium power (4 kW ERP) relay of the national radio channels, in addition to local stations).

Wrotham was the first station in the UK to broadcast on VHF/FM, with three services beginning officially on 2 May 1955. It broadcast the Home Service (now Radio 4), the Third Programme (now Radio 3) and the Light Programme (now Radio 2). The frequencies it used for these programmes on FM in 1955 are still in use today. On 17 April 1966, it became the first BBC transmitter to broadcast in stereo, with regular stereo broadcasts on the Third Programme from July 1966. On 18 December 1970, it began broadcasting Radio Medway (now Radio Kent) on 97.0 MHz.

Wrotham was one of two VHF transmitters identified as BBC network centres in the event of a nuclear strike on the UK. A Cabinet Office paper from 1975 provides details of construction work outstanding at Wrotham, including protected accommodation for engineering staff at a cost of about thirty thousand pounds. Wrotham was part of the Wartime Broadcasting Service, designed to allow transmission of pre and post strike messages to the estimated 22 million battery-powered radios in the UK.

On 3 December 2010, Wrotham began transmitting DAB: CE London (London 1), Switch London (London 2), DRG London (London 3), Digital One and the BBC National DAB multiplex. The BBC National DAB multiplex is on the network's standard SFN, improving DAB coverage in North Kent and South London.

It is owned and operated by Arqiva.

== History ==
In the early 1950s, a microwave television link was constructed to London, from Harvel, near Wrotham, Warren St at Lenham and going east to Swingate, then over the English Channel to Alembon and Cassel, Nord where the 405-lines was converted to 819 lines. The microwave network was run by EMI and the GPO. In August 1950, TV had been broadcast via microwave from France, on to Lenham, then to Bloomsbury in London, Senate House, London. The area was a possible site for the London TV transmitter.

=== FM ===
An experimental FM service had been broadcasting since 1950, broadcasting the Third Programme. Contracts were placed by the BBC in January 1948. FM stations would cost £20,000 to £50,000. Construction began in March 1948. It would be 25 kW, with an 18 kW MW transmitter. The 470-foot (140 m) mast would be built by BICC.

In March 1954 the BBC ordered 24 FM radio transmitters from Standard Telephones and Cables Ltd. Herbrand Sackville, 9th Earl De La Warr was responsible for the siting of new radio services.

== Channels listed by frequency ==
=== Analogue radio (FM VHF) ===
Frequency	kW	Service
89.1 MHz	250	BBC Radio 2
91.3 MHz	250	BBC Radio 3
93.5 MHz	250	BBC Radio 4
96.7 MHz	8.7	BBC Radio Kent
98.8 MHz	125	BBC Radio 1
100.9 MHz	250	Classic FM
101.6 MHz	0.4	KMFM West Kent

=== Digital radio (DAB) ===
Frequency	Block	kW	Operator
218.640 MHz	11B	4.5	DRG London
220.352 MHz	11C	2	NOW Kent
222.064 MHz	11D	4.5	Digital One
223.936 MHz	12A	4.5	Switch London
225.648 MHz	12B	10	BBC National DAB
227.360 MHz	12C	4.5	CE London

== See also ==
- List of tallest buildings and structures in Great Britain
