= Beula =

Beula may refer to:

- Jak Beula (born 1963), British entrepreneur
- Johana Harris (1912–1995), Canadian pianist, composer and music educator born Beula Duffy
- Beula Nunn (1914-1995), wife of former Kentucky Governor Louie B. Nunn and preservationist
- Beula, Pennsylvania, Cambria County - see List of places in Pennsylvania

== See also ==
- Beulas, a coachbuilder based in Spain
- Beulah (disambiguation)
