= Long Lane Wood =

Ancient woodland in Monks Orchard, Croydon, Greater London, United Kingdom

Coordinates: 51.3904°N 0.0527°W

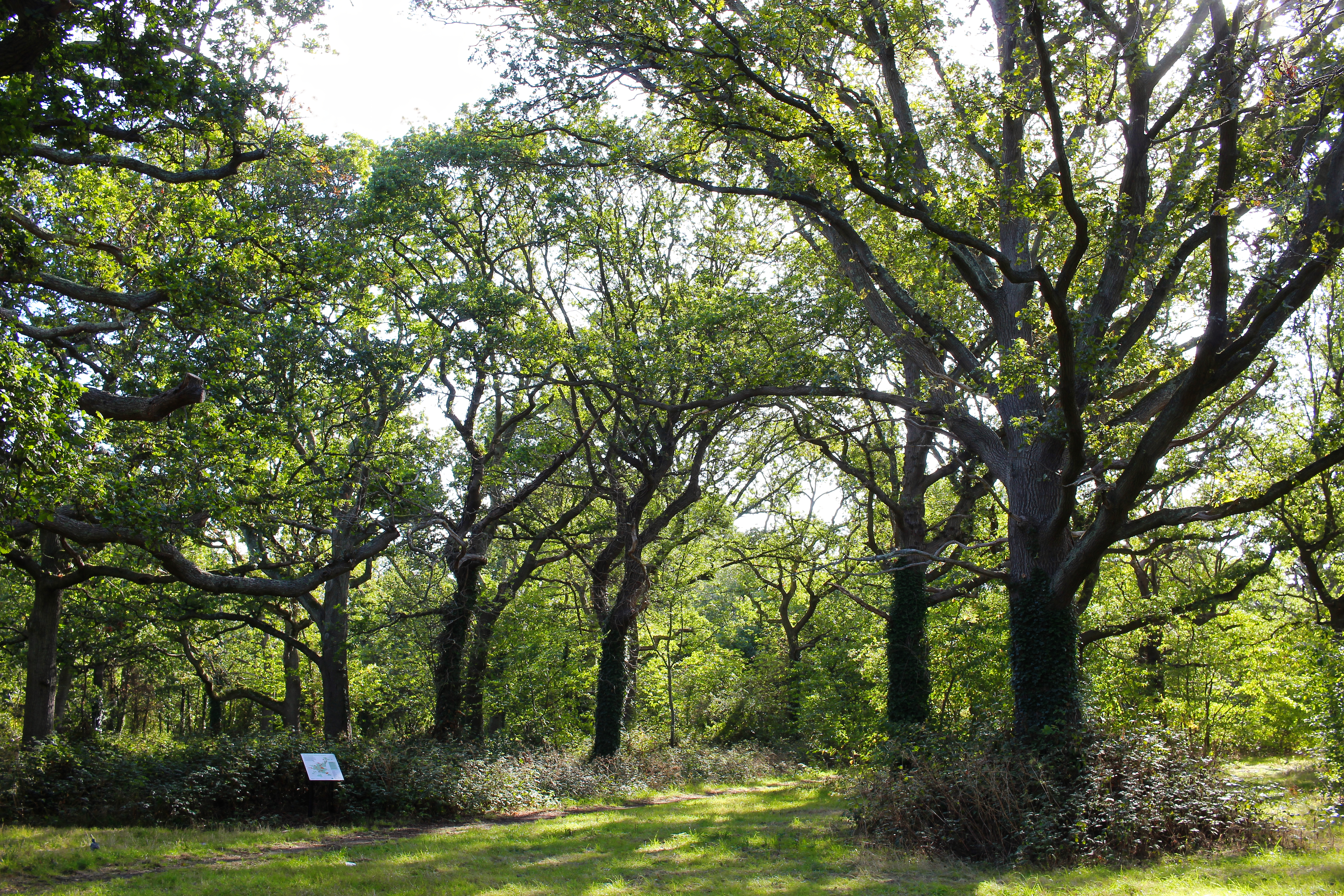
Long Lane Wood

Long Lane Wood is an area of ancient woodland in the suburb of Monks Orchard within the London borough of Croydon. The wood covers an area of 15.07 acres, is criss crossed by paths and is frequented by dog walkers. The wood is mainly made up of English Oak and the occasional European beech. Bywood Avenue Bird Sanctuary can be found to the rear of the wood, it is small fenced off area set aside for wildlife. The wood was a part of the Great North Wood.
