= Beulah Heights =

Beulah Heights may refer to:

- Beaulieu Heights, London, England
- Beulah Heights, California, former town
