= Spa Wood =

Woodland in the London Borough of Croydon, England

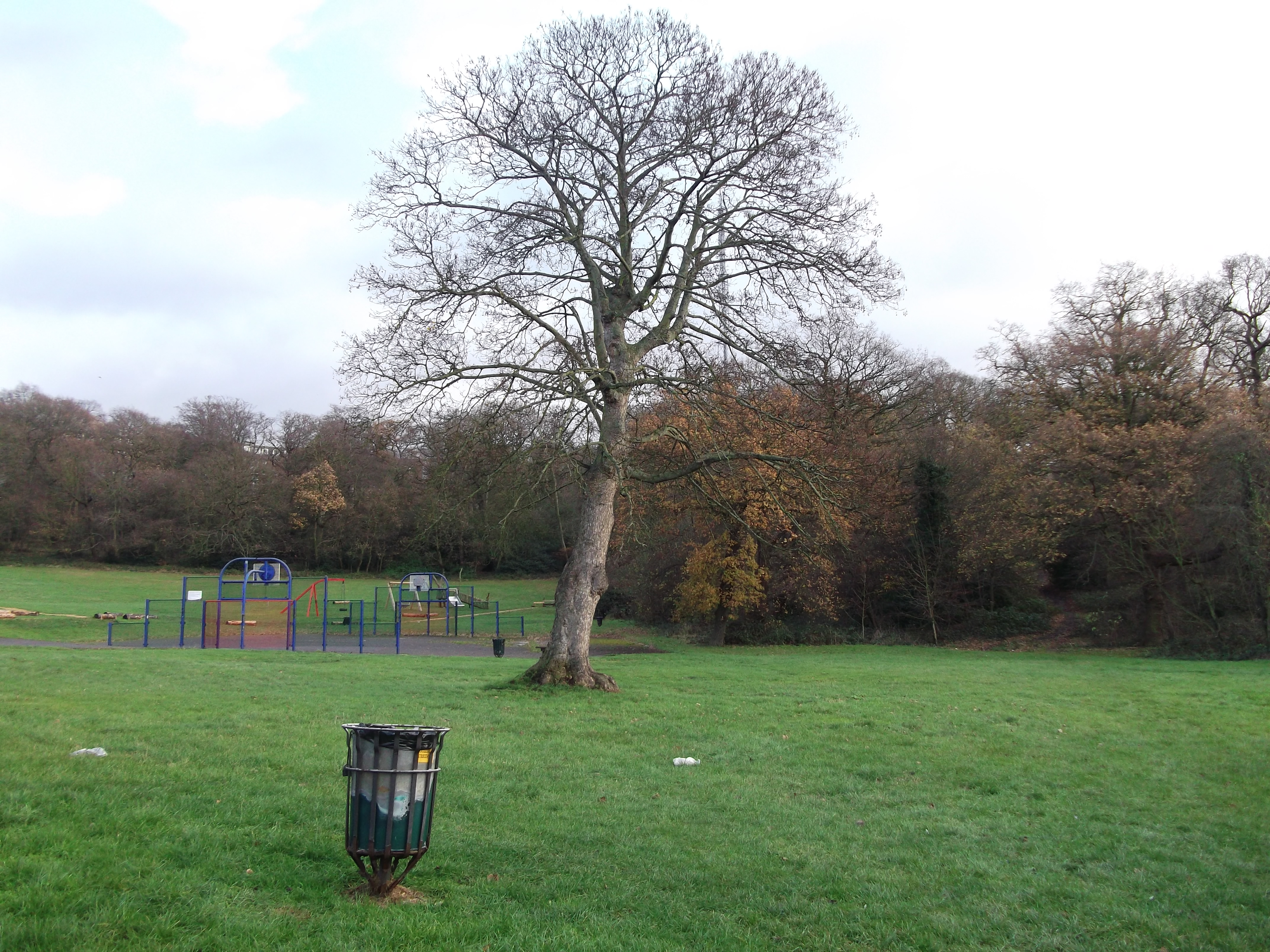
- The Lawns

- Location within Greater London
- Type: Park
- Location: London Borough of Croydon
- Coordinates: 51.4119°N 0.09299°W
- Operator: London Wildlife Trust

Spa Wood is an area of ancient woodland in the London Borough of Croydon that was once a part of The Great North Wood. In 2017, the London Wildlife Trust began a four-year project based around the Great North Wood, working with Croydon Council and the Friends of Spa Wood to improve the site for wildlife, as a part of The Great North Wood Project. The 15.5 acres (6.3 ha) site, also known as The Lawns, is owned by the Borough of Croydon and includes the woods, a multi-games court and playground.

== History ==
Originally, there was a chalybeate spring, now lost, that could be found on the grounds that was known to locals for centuries and can be traced back, possibly even to the time of King John. Although the spring is now lost, the history has not been forgotten.

A map of 1800 shows that the area was known as Bewlye Coppice, adjacent to Bewlye Farm.

Spa Wood takes its name from Beulah Spa, a popular mineral spa built on the site in 1831. Decimus Burton, architect of London Zoo and the Wellington Arch at Hyde Park Corner, designed the spa gardens, spa house and lodge and grounds, which contained a circus ring, a rosery, an upper and lower lake, a maze, a camera obscura, a telescope powerful enough to see Windsor Castle and an orchestra. The spa was opened by Lady Essex and was visited by Queen Victoria, William I, German Emperor and Charles Dickens. It was immensely popular until 1856, when, two years after the arrival of The Crystal Palace close by, the spa fell into disuse. Now only the lodge remains, which has since been renamed Tivoli Lodge.

In May 1858, the estate was put up for auction and was built upon. A large mansion 'The Lawns' was built sometime later and was demolished after a fire in the 1960s.
