= Great North Wood =

Wood in south London

Coordinates: 51.426507°N 0.077161°W

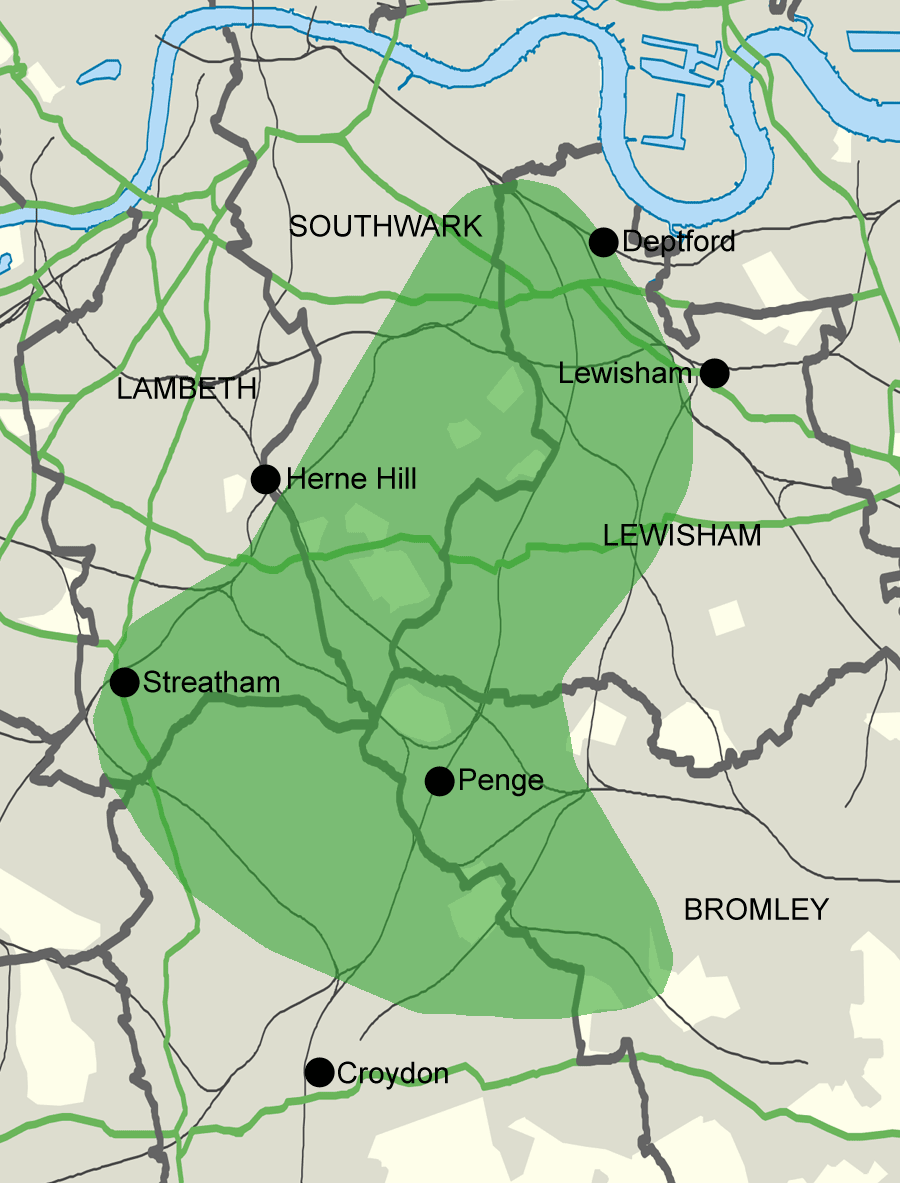
The approximate historical area of the Great North Wood

The Great North Wood was a natural oak woodland that started three miles (4.8 km) south-east of central London and scaled the Norwood Ridge. At its full extent, the wood's boundaries stretched almost as far as Croydon and as far north as Camberwell. It had occasional landownings as large clearings, well-established by the Middle Ages such as the hamlets of Penge and Dulwich.

Twenty small fragments or re-plantations remain including Dulwich Wood, Sydenham Hill Wood, Biggin Wood and Beaulieu Heights.

Many placenames refer to the Great North Wood. Today's suburban placenames that contain the contraction Norwood include South Norwood, Upper Norwood and West Norwood (known as Lower Norwood until 1885). Other settlements that reflect the area's woodland past are Woodside, Forest Hill, Honor Oak and Penge, which is from Celtic penceat, meaning "edge of wood" (modern Welsh Pencoed).

== History ==
The earliest surviving mention of the wood dates from assize records in 1272, and it was known to be owned by the Whitehorse family during the reign of King Edward III. When Oliver Cromwell seized it from the Archbishop of Canterbury its area was measured at 830 acres (3.4 km^{2}), but it held only 9,200 oaken pollards.

Since the Middle Ages the woodland has been managed to provide goods of economic worth. The coppices were used to provide timber, charcoal, oak bark, and small wood whilst the commons and pastureland were used for grazing and as a source of turf and firewood.

Oak standards would have yielded timber for ship construction at the Royal Dockyard at Deptford, established in 1513, whilst the oak bark was taken to Bermondsey for leather making. Here it was boiled to extract tannins for use in the tanning process.

Oak and hornbeam were coppiced every 10–20 years to provide wood for charcoal. The charcoal burning took place in conical kilns in the wood, overseen by colliers, who then traded their products in markets. The charcoal was the primary fuel for bakeries and cookhouses for hundreds of years as King Edward I banned the use of coal from the north-east of England because it produced too much smoke. In 1870, the antiquary Andrew Ducarel noted that "the town [of Croydon] is surrounded with hills well covered with wood, whereof great store of charcoal is made."

Ancient oak trees were kept to mark the boundaries between parishes. The most notable of these trees was the Vicar's Oak that marked the boundary of four ancient parishes: Lambeth, Camberwell, Croydon and a detached portion of Battersea parish: the manor and hamlet of Penge. The site is now the junction of Westow Hill and Anerley Hill at Crystal Palace Park and is the quadripoint of the boroughs of Lambeth, Southwark, Croydon and Bromley. John Aubrey referred to this "ancient remarkable tree" in the past tense as early as 1718, but according to JB Wilson, the Vicar's Oak survived until 1825.

Another oak tree that survived the depredations of the shipbuilders was the Question Oak at Westwood, Charles Spurgeon's mansion, under which he challenged his students to query theological matters. Its role should not be confused with the Metropolitan Tabernacle or Spurgeon's College.

By 1745, John Rocque's map of London and its environs showed the woodland to be only 3 miles (4.8 km) wide, turned over to agricultural common land at Croydon, Penge, Streatham, Knight's Hill, Dulwich and Westwood.

Private landowners cleared much of the surviving woodland such as in the south under the Croydon Inclosure Act 1797 (37 Geo. 3. c. 144 Pr.) and in the centre-west on sale of the late Lord Thurlow's estates in 1806.

Other recreational activities, such as the pleasure gardens at Knight's Hill and the Spa on Beulah Hill, succumbed to the housebuilding boom of the Victorian era, eclipsed by The Crystal Palace, the park of which hosts a major UK athletics ground.

== Cultural references ==
On 11 August 1668, Samuel Pepys wrote of visiting fortune tellers in these woods "This afternoon my wife and Mercer and Deb went with Pelting to see the Gypsies at Lambeth, and have their fortunes told; but what they did, I did not enquire." An encampment was recorded continuously there until broken up by police during the first enclosures.

In 1722, Daniel Defoe wrote of a "country being more open and more woody than any other part so near London, especially about Norwood, the parishes of Camberwell, Dullege and Luseme".

As late as 1802, a hermit known as "Matthews the hairyman" lived in the wood in a cave or "excavated residence" within the woods.

Mischief Acts by Zoe Gilbert, a cycle of short stories and poems melding the story of the wood with that of Herne the Hunter, was published in 2021.

== The Great North Wood Project ==
In 2017 the London Wildlife Trust secured funding from the Heritage Lottery Fund for a four-year project to develop plans for a Living Landscape project based around the Great North Wood. The project aims to raise awareness of this largely forgotten woodland and to encourage residents to explore, enjoy and value the natural wealth on their doorsteps. Further funding was awarded and the project was extended until March 2023.

The Trust have selected 13 woods where they are carrying out habitat improvement works: New Cross Gate Cutting, One Tree Hill, Dulwich Wood, Sydenham Hill Wood, Hillcrest Wood, Crystal Palace Park, Streatham Common, Convent Wood, Biggin Wood, Spa Wood (The Lawns), Beaulieu Heights, Grangewood Park and Long Lane Wood. Additional sites include South Norwood Country Park, Upper Norwood Recreation Ground, Stambourne Woodland Walk, Devonshire Road and Garthorne Road Nature Reserves, Buckthorne Road and Darces Wood LNR, Unigate Wood LNR.

== See also ==
- List of Sites of Special Scientific Interest in Greater London
- List of ancient woods in England
