= Beaulieu Heights =

Woodland in London, England

Coordinates: 51.410°N 0.084°W

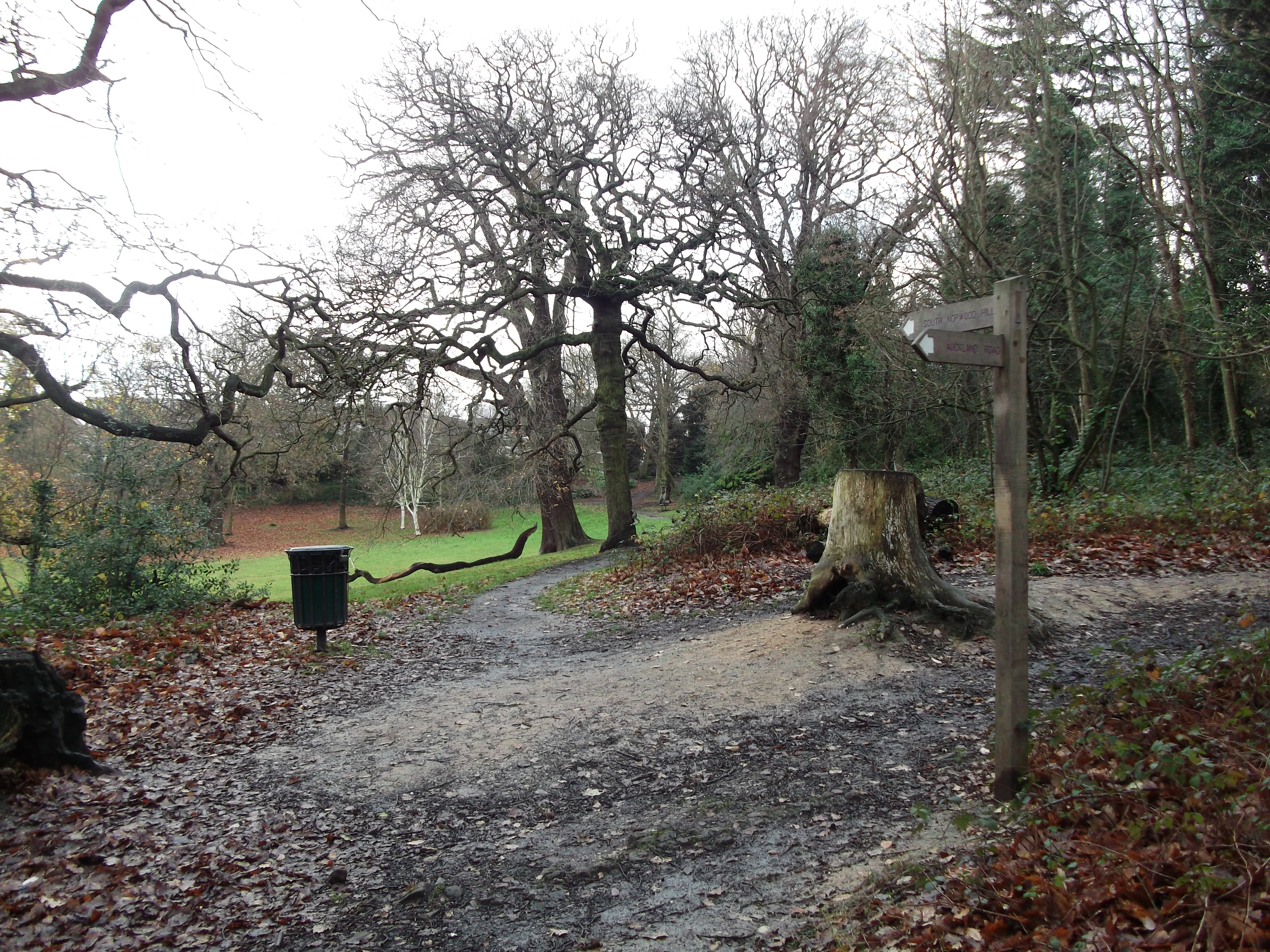
Footpath junction in Beaulieu Heights

Beaulieu Heights (locally /ˈbjuːlə/ BEW-lə) 16 acres (6.5 ha) is an area of ancient woodland between South Norwood and Upper Norwood in the London Borough of Croydon, London. It is located between South Norwood Hill and Auckland Road with Auckland Rise to the north and Tummonds Gardens to the south. There are pedestrian entrances from South Norwood Hill and Auckland Rise, and a pond. The name is pronounced as if spelled "Beulah" like the nearby Beulah Hill, and not like the French word or the town of Beaulieu, Hampshire.

The wood is a remnant of The Great North Wood and is currently managed by The London Wildlife Trust along with Croydon Council as a part of its Great North Wood Project.

== History ==
South Norwood Hill was previously known as Beulah Hill or Beggar's Hill, the latter name possibly relating to the gypsies who populated the Great North Wood.

In August 1976, over 1-acre (4,000 m^{2}) of the Oak woodland was destroyed by fire, due to the warm temperatures. This area was subsequently replanted and the flora and fauna which previously existed in the woodland re-colonised the area.

In 2009, a conservation group called The Friends of Beaulieu Heights was formed to improve accessibility and biodiversity of the woodland. The group worked in partnership with Croydon Council and has produced a woodland management plan for the park, which was approved by the Forestry Commission. Volunteers have opened up footpaths, installed waymarkers and notice board, built steps and planted a community orchard. In line with the management plant, 1ha of holly was removed from site in 2012, in order to bring light back to the woodland floor to allow groundflora and a new generation of trees to flourish. Further work is planned to restore the woodland and bring it back into active management. The Friends hold regular volunteer workdays on site, deliver guided walks and community events to promote the woodland as a community resource and haven for wildlife.

The Croydon transmitting station, a broadcasting and telecommunications facility, is located on Beaulieu Heights. It was established in 1955 and initially used a small lattice tower. The present tower is 152 metres (499 ft) high and was built in 1962.

== See also ==
- List of Parks and Open Spaces in Croydon
- Crystal Palace Park
- South Norwood Lake and Grounds
- Croydon transmitting station
