= Beulah Park =

Beulah Park may refer to:

- Beulah Park, Ohio, a thoroughbred racetrack in Columbus
- Beulah Park, South Australia, a suburb of Adelaide
