= Beulah Elfreth Kennard =

American lecturer and writer

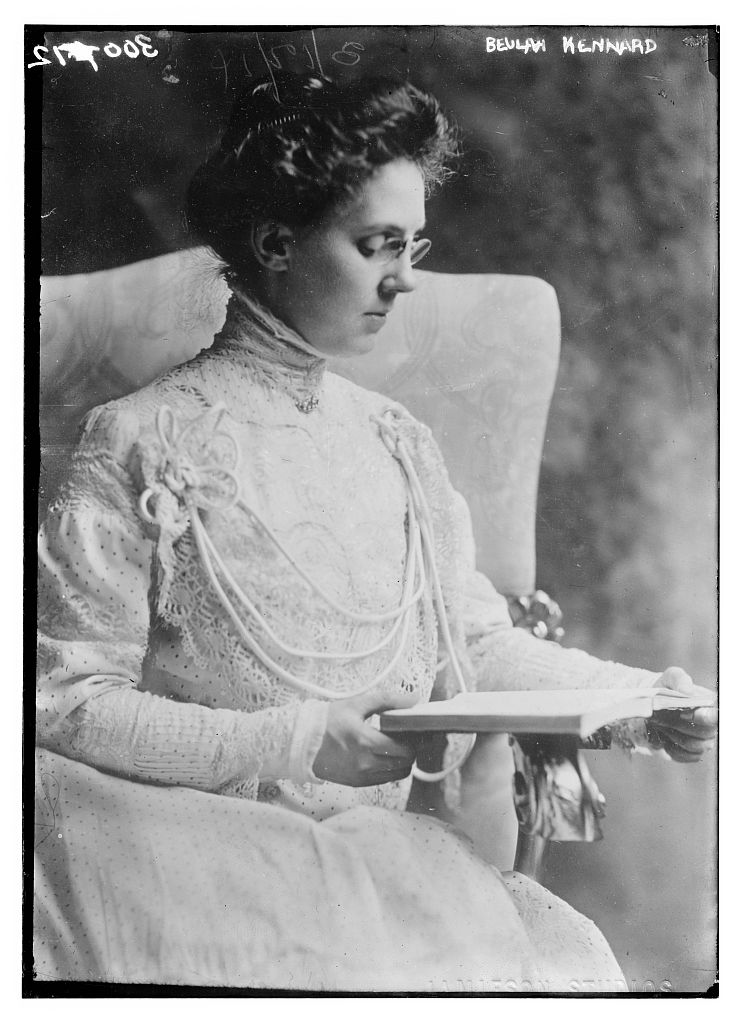
Beulah Elfreth Kennard

Beulah Elfreth Kennard (August 3, 1869 – November 8, 1949) was an American lecturer and writer. She served as the educational director of the Association of Department Store Workers, president of the Pennsylvania Association of Women Workers, and president of the Pittsburgh Playground Association from 1900 to 1918.

== Early years and education ==
Beulah Elfreth Kennard was born on August 3, 1869, in Philadelphia, Pennsylvania. Her parents were Reverend Joseph Spencer Kennard and Nancy Reid Jeffers.

She was a graduate of Chicago schools, 1887; and received an honorary A.M. degree from the University of Pittsburgh, 1912.

== Career ==
Kennard opened Pittsburgh's first public playground at the Forbes School Yard on July 6, 1896. She went on to become president of the Pittsburgh Playground Association from 1900 to 1918.

Kennard favored woman suffrage; and served on the Advisory Board Pennsylvania State Suffrage Association. She was a member of the Board of Public Education, 1912–13; as well as the D.A.R., Twentieth Century Club, Tuesday Musical Club. She was a contributor to various publications on the subjects of play and children's reading. In religion, Kennard was a Baptist.

In 1918, a playground was named in her honor. In 1944, that playground was to be renamed to honor a local judge, Ralph H. Smith. Local opposition prevented the park from changing name, and it is still called "Kennard playground".

== Selected works ==
- "The educational director" (1918)
- "Department store merchandise manuals" (1920)
