= Croydon transmitting station =

Broadcasting and telecommunications facility in London

Croydon
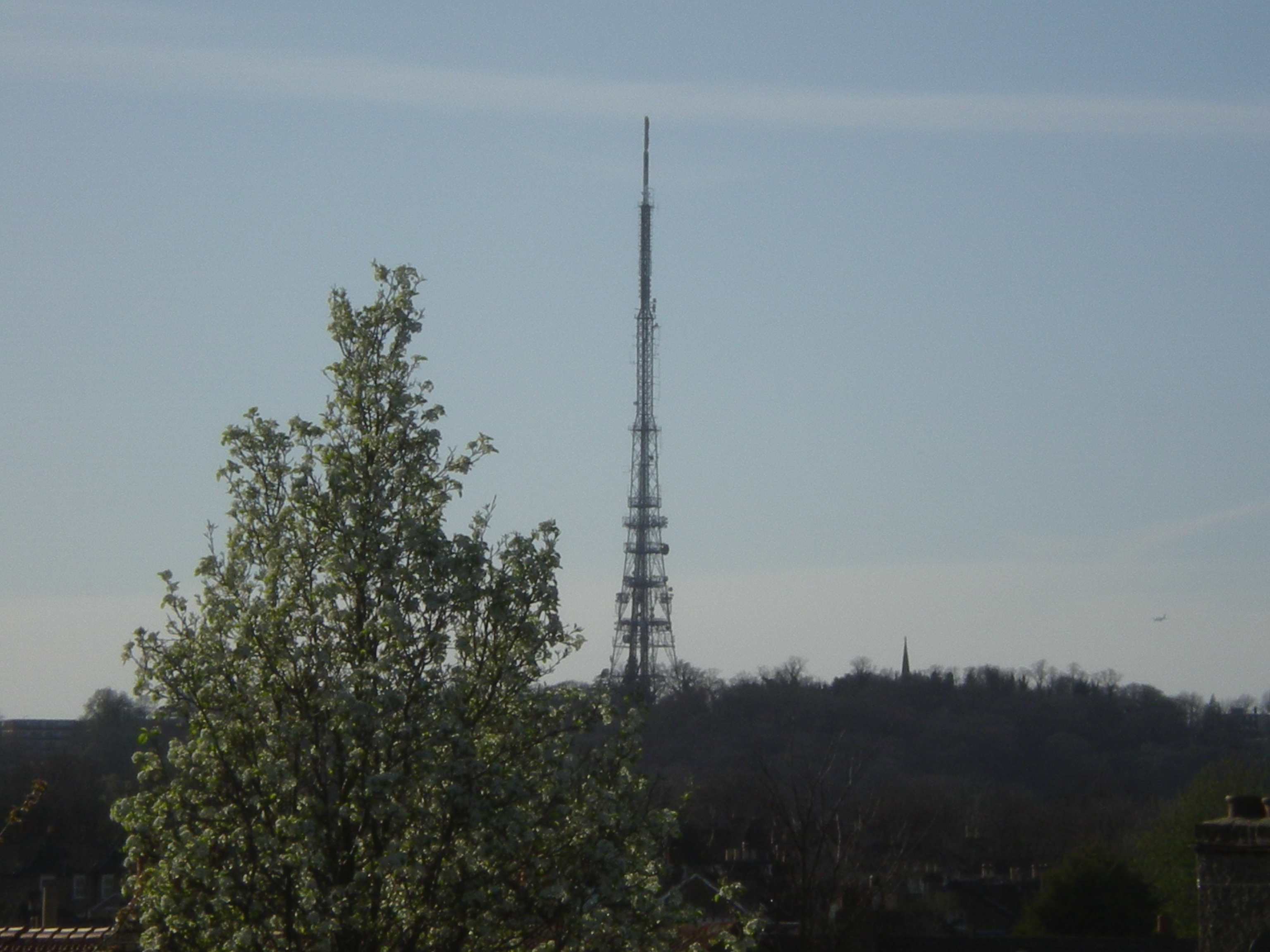

- Location within Greater London
- Tower height: 152 metres (499 ft)
- Coordinates: 51.409722°N 0.085833°W
- Grid reference: TQ332696
- Built: 1955 (original tower); 1962 (current tower)
- BBC region: BBC London (backup)
- ITV region: ITV London (backup)
- Local TV service: London Live (backup)

The Croydon transmitting station is a broadcasting and telecommunications facility on Beaulieu Heights in Upper Norwood, London, England (grid reference TQ332696), in the London Borough of Croydon, owned by Arqiva. It was established in 1955 and initially used a small lattice tower. The present tower is 152 metres (499 ft) high and was built in 1962.

It was originally used to broadcast the London ITV signal on VHF Band III. When UHF broadcasting began, the nearby Crystal Palace transmitting station was used. VHF television was discontinued in 1985, and the Croydon transmitter was not used for regular TV broadcasting until 1997, when a new directional UHF antenna, designed to avoid interference with continental transmitters, was installed to carry the newly launched Channel 5 in the London area. It carried Channel 5's analogue signal, and the digital terrestrial signal is transmitted from Crystal Palace. Croydon also had reserve transmitters for BBC1, BBC2, ITV and Channel 4, but these were used only in the event of engineering works or a failure at Crystal Palace. Since the digital switchover in April 2012 no television has been broadcast from Croydon, but it is still used as a backup for Crystal Palace for the BBC A & B, Digital 3&4 and COM 4, 5 and 6 multiplexes.

The site is also a maintenance base for transmitter maintenance teams and used to house one of four regional operations centres.

== Channels listed by frequency ==
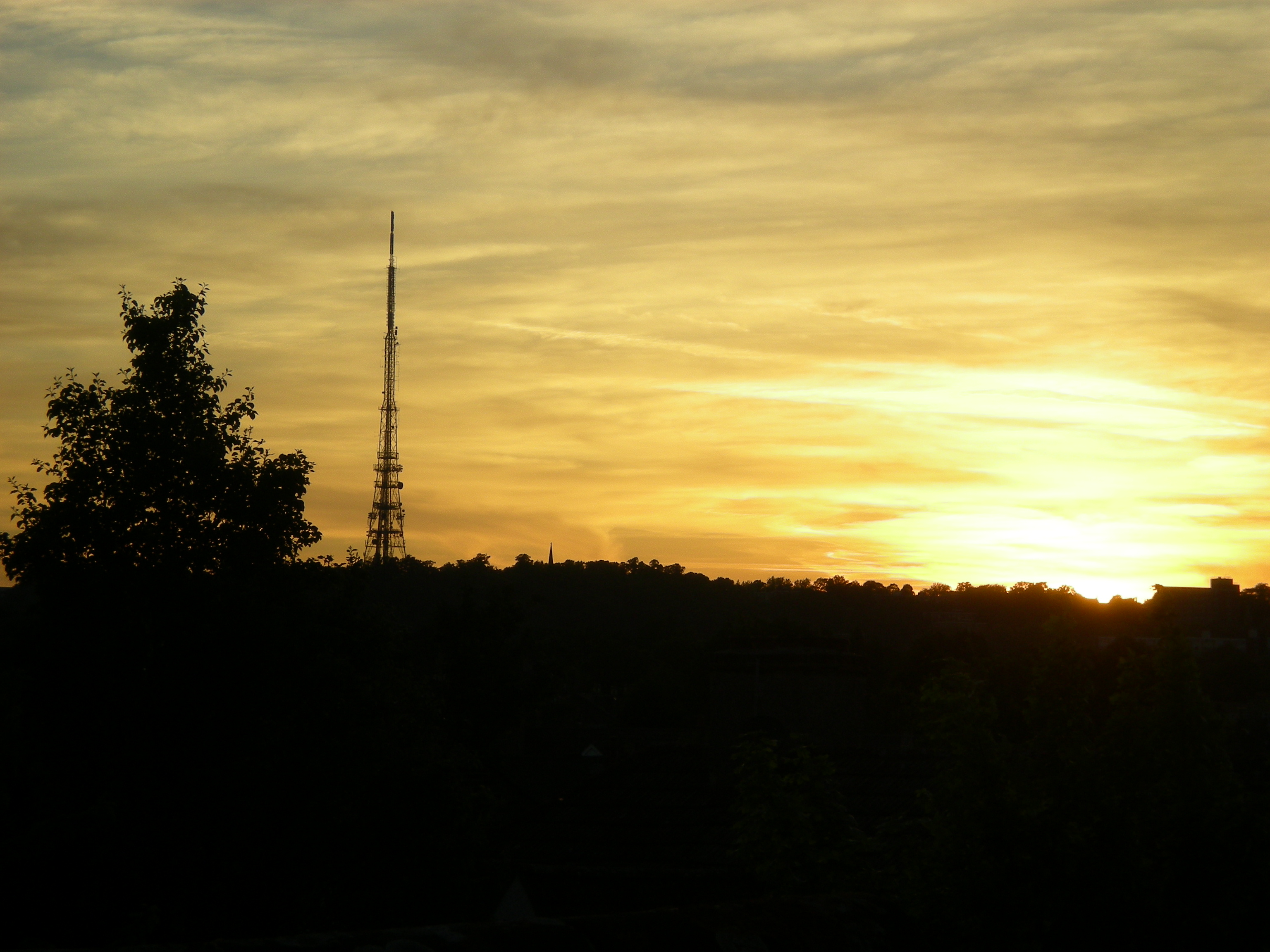
Croydon transmitter at sunset.

=== Analogue radio (FM VHF) ===
Frequency	kW	Service
94.9 MHz	—	BBC Radio London†
95.8 MHz	4	Capital London
97.3 MHz	4	LBC
100.0 MHz^^	4	Hits Radio (London)
102.2 MHz	4	Smooth London
105.4 MHz	4	Magic
106.2 MHz	4	Heart London

† Backup for Crystal Palace.

^^ Hits Radio London took over the frequency on 23rd September 2024, Kiss is now fully digital station on DAB nationally and locally on London 1 DAB multiplex

=== Digital radio (DAB) ===
Frequency	Block	kW	Operator
218.640 MHz	11B	2.5	DRG London
227.360 MHz	12C	5	CE London

=== Analogue television ===
==== 22 September 1955 – 3 January 1985 ====
The past ITV franchises which originally served London were Associated-Rediffusion (weekdays) and Associated Television (weekends) began transmitting on VHF 9 on 22 September 1955, and were the first ITV services. The transmitter's power was originally 60 kW but after the new tower was built in 1962 this was increased to 400 kW. Thames Television and London Weekend Television took over the London franchise area in 1968. The VHF analogue service closed down, along with the rest of the UK, on 3 January 1985.

Frequency	VHF	kW	Service
194.75 MHz	9	400	Rediffusion/ATV (1955–1968); Thames/LWT (1968–1985)

==== 30 March 1997 – 18 April 2012 ====
Channel 5 launched on 30 March 1997 with transmissions from Croydon and other former IBA VHF sites in the UK. Reserve senders for ITV and Channel 4 was later added in case they were not available from Crystal Palace and some time later, BBC1 and BBC2.

Frequency	UHF	kW	Service
487.25 MHz	23	—	ITV London†
543.25 MHz	30	—	Channel 4†
599.25 MHz	37	1000	Channel 5

† Backup for Crystal Palace.

=== Digital television ===
==== 18 April 2012 – present ====
Since 18 April 2012, no television has been broadcast from Croydon. However, backup for the PSB1, 2 and 3 and COM4, 5 and 6 multiplexes are available should there be a problem at Crystal Palace.

Frequency	UHF	kW	Service	System
490.000 MHz	23	200	BBC A†	DVB-T
514.000 MHz	26	200	Digital 3&4†	DVB-T
545.833 MHz	30-	200	BBC B†	DVB-T2

† Backup for Crystal Palace.

== See also ==
- Wrotham transmitting station, Brookmans Park transmitting station and Droitwich transmitting station – the main radio transmitters serving London on VHF, mediumwave and longwave respectively.
- List of tallest towers in the world
- List of tallest structures in the United Kingdom
