= Beulah Thumbadoo =

Beulah Thumbadoo is the founder of Everyone's Reading in Africa (ERA).

Thumbadoo works to promote literacy in South Africa and globally as well. She founded ERA at the University of Witwatersrand and has developed it into an independent organization. The mission of ERA is to increase the availability of reading material and government-aided adult literacy programs. Initiatives include the BookBox, a portable library of texts, the African Language series, which includes 40 stories in 10 languages, and an annual short story competition.

Thumbadoo campaigned the South African national minister of education to declare 2001 the "Year of the Reader."

In 2000, she was elected an Ashoka Fellow.
