= Beulah (Blake) =

Concept in William Blake's mythology

In William Blake's mythology, Beulah, originally Hebrew בְּעוּלָה (bə‘ūlāh, traditionally transliterated Beulah /ˈbjuːlə/ BEW-lə and meaning "married" or "espoused"), is "the realm of the Subconscious, the source of poetic inspiration and of dreams." It is also, according to Blake scholar Alexander S. Gourlay, "a dreamy paradise where the sexes, though divided, blissfully converse in shameless selflessness. Beulah is available through dreams and visions to those in Ulro, the utterly fallen world." Between Eternity and Ulro, it is imagined as a place without conflict similar to a conventional image of heaven or Eternity. However, for Blake, the idea of an everlasting peaceful Eternity is misguided and fallen.

== Origins ==
Beulah, in its Hebrew origins, often indicates, the happy and delightful for the Lord's country (See Isaiah 62:4). This is one of names given to Palestine when it is rejoined to God after the exile, a prophesied attribute of the land of Israel. John Bunyan in his Pilgrim's Progress also uses the name "Beuhlah". Joseph Hogan describes Bunyan's Beuhlah as "the pastoral earthly paradise (in sight of the Heavenly City) where Christian and the other pilgrims rest before crossing the River of Death and entering the Heavenly City."

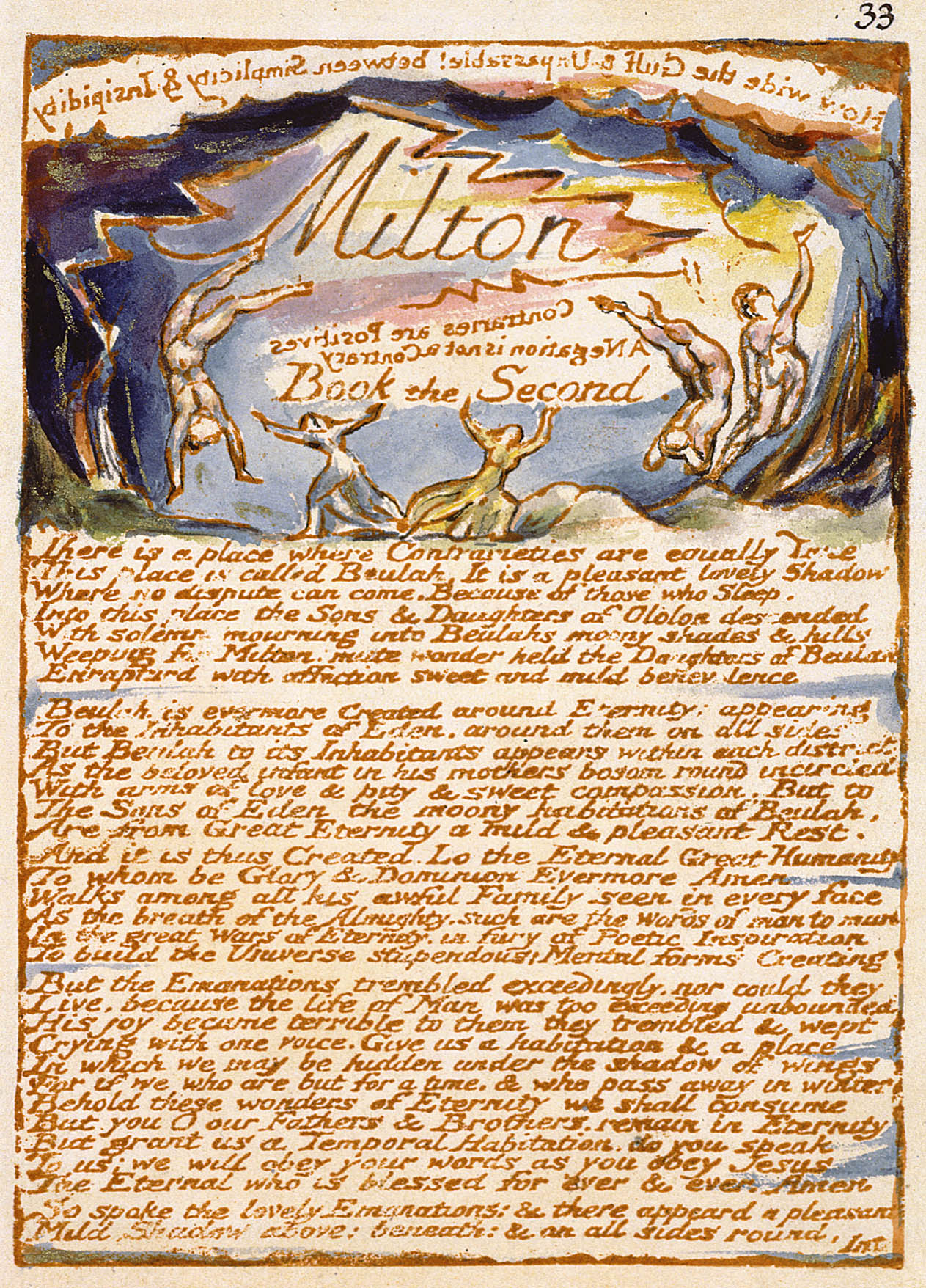
Milton a Poem. The beginning of Book the second, copy D, 1818 (Library of Congress)

== Appearances ==
Beulah occurs 182 times in Blake's works. It first appeared in Night the first of The Four Zoas, where in described as "a mild & pleasant rest", "a Soft Moony Universe feminine lovely / Pure mild & Gentle given in Mercy to those who sleep Eternally. Created by the Lamb of God around / On all sides within & without the Universal Man". In that place "The Daughters of Beulah follow sleepers in all their Dreams /Creating Spaces lest they fall into Eternal Death". (The Four Zoas, 5:29-35)

Blake also described Beulah in his poem Milton: as "a place where Contraries are equally True". Blake notes that "Beulah is evermore created around Eternity; appearing / To the Inhabitants of Eden around them on all sides." And also "Beulah to its Inhabitants appears within each district, / As the beloved infant in his mother's bosom round incircled / With arms of love & pity & sweet compassion." (Milton. Book the second, 30:1-31:11)

In the poem Jerusalem The Emanation of the Giant Albion Blake develops his statements about Beulah. He notes there that in Beulah the unions of the sexes are ideal and unrestricted

== See also ==
- Beulah (disambiguation)
- Beulah (given name)
