= Beulah, Virginia =

Unincorporated community in Virginia, United States

Coordinates: 37°23′01″N 76°26′32″W

Beulah is an unincorporated community in Gloucester County, in the U. S. state of Virginia.
