= List of storms named Beulah =

The name Beulah has been used for three tropical cyclones in the Atlantic Ocean.

- Tropical Storm Beulah (1959), formed in the Bay of Campeche, just off the Mexican coastline
- Hurricane Beulah (1963), did not make landfall
- Hurricane Beulah (1967), Category 5 hurricane; struck the Yucatán peninsula of Mexico, crossed the Gulf of Mexico and made second landfall near the Mexico–Texas border

Following the 1967 season, the name, Beulah was retired by the US Weather Bureau in the Atlantic basin and was replaced by Beth for the 1971 season.
