= Beulah, Maryland =

Unincorporated community in Maryland, United States

- Unincorporated community
- Location within Maryland
- Coordinates: 38°40′40″N 75°53′57″W
- Country: United States
- State: Maryland
- County: Dorchester
- Elevation: 30 ft (9.1 m)
- Time zone: UTC−5 (Eastern (EST))
  - Summer (DST): UTC−4 (EDT)
- Area codes: 410 & 443
- GNIS feature ID: 589750

Beulah is an unincorporated community in Dorchester County, Maryland, United States. Beulah is located on Maryland Route 16, 7 miles (11 km) west of Federalsburg.
