= Biggin Wood =

Preserved ancient woodland

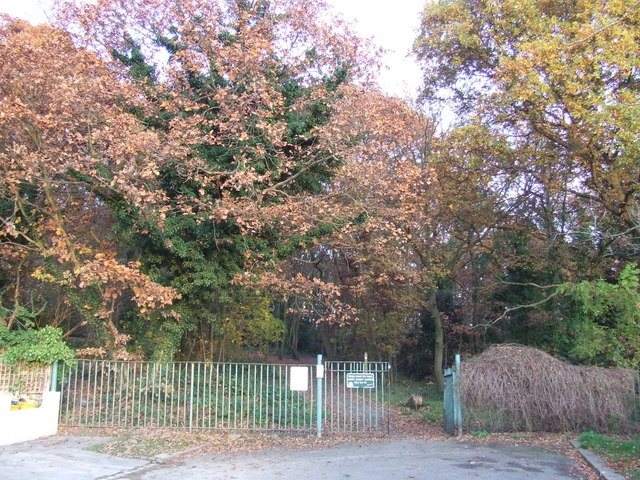

- Location within Greater London
- Interactive map of Biggin Wood
- Type: Public park (woodland)
- Location: Norbury, London, SW16
- OS grid: TQ 3169 7019
- Coordinates: 51.4158°N 0.1075°W
- Area: 13.50 acres (5.46 ha)
- Created: 1939 (acquired by Croydon Council)
- Owner: London Borough of Croydon
- Operator: London Borough of Croydon
- Status: Open all year; closed at night
- Public transit: London Buses, route 468 to Biggin Hill stop Route 250 to Virginia Road / St. Oswald’s stop

Biggin Wood (also known as Biggin Woods) is an area of ancient oak woodland situated within the London Borough of Croydon. The London Wildlife Trust is currently working with Croydon Council and the Friends of Biggin Wood to improve the site for wildlife, as a part of The Great North Wood Project.

Biggin Wood is home to a range of British wildlife, including the Great spotted woodpecker, English Oak and Bluebell.

== History ==
The origins of Biggin Wood can be traced as far back as 1493 when it was mentioned in Archbishop Morton's land rental which states, "Biggins Farm, Biggenswood - in landes called Biggynge, an ancient estate 120 acres on the South side confronting Bewlay".

Later, a 1678 survey by Archbishop Laud shows Biggin Hill Coppice as covering 78 acres. The survey states, "These coppices have been felled 10 years. Growth then fenced in for 10 years for saving the spring and afterward. Commoners have their common therein for three years, till the next fall. The herbage, bushes, thorns and the wood are claimed by tenants of the manor and so have been from time to time enjoyed by them". Evidence of these coppices can still be seen in the wood today.

The 1800 Milne's land-use map shows Biggin Wood surrounded by pasture, arable land and market gardens. The wood is shown to extend into what is now allotments.

In 1801, the Croydon Enclosure Award allowed landowners to sell or lease land for development. Several houses with spacious gardens were built on Beulah Hill, by Biggin Hill between 1800 and 1840.

Sometime between 1800 and 1828, Bigginwood House was built in the area just north of the wood. In 1838, Hugh Bowditch took possession of the house and some other parcels of land which together formed the Biggin Wood Estate. After the death of Bowditch in 1870 the house passed into the ownership of James Epps, producer of the celebrated ‘Epp’s Homeopathic Cocoa’. By the 1920s the estate had fallen into dereliction and the woods were not accessible. During the 1930s the housing estate surrounding the wood had been completed. In 1934, the house burnt down perhaps because of a fire built by someone seeking shelter inside the house. In 1938 the Streatham Antiquarian and Natural History Society enlisted the help of the Metropolitan Public Gardens Association to maintain the wood as public open space. In 1939 the council purchased the estate from Miss Sylvia Linton a descendant of James Epps on the condition that the land was to remain as a bird sanctuary and open space. The tennis courts and facilities were added in 1949. This scuppered previous plans to connect the two halves of Covington Way and build houses on the northern half of the wood. The four acres to the east of the wood known as Hilly Fields were converted to allotments which remain to this day.

During World War II a small air raid shelter was constructed in the wood near the entrance to Covington Way. One small bomb landed in the wood, leaving a crater which can still be seen today.

After the war, plans were revived for the completion of a road between the two halves of Covington Way. Many of the trees were removed from the northern part of the wood except for a few standard oaks.

In 1997, local people formed Action for Biggin Wood and with British Trust for Conservation Volunteers, now The Conservation Volunteers, they worked to manage the wood, restore paths and repair steps.

== Facilities ==
- Woodland walks
- Tennis courts
- Changing rooms and toilets (including disabled toilets).
