= Dulwich =

Coordinates: 51.4457°N 0.0779°W

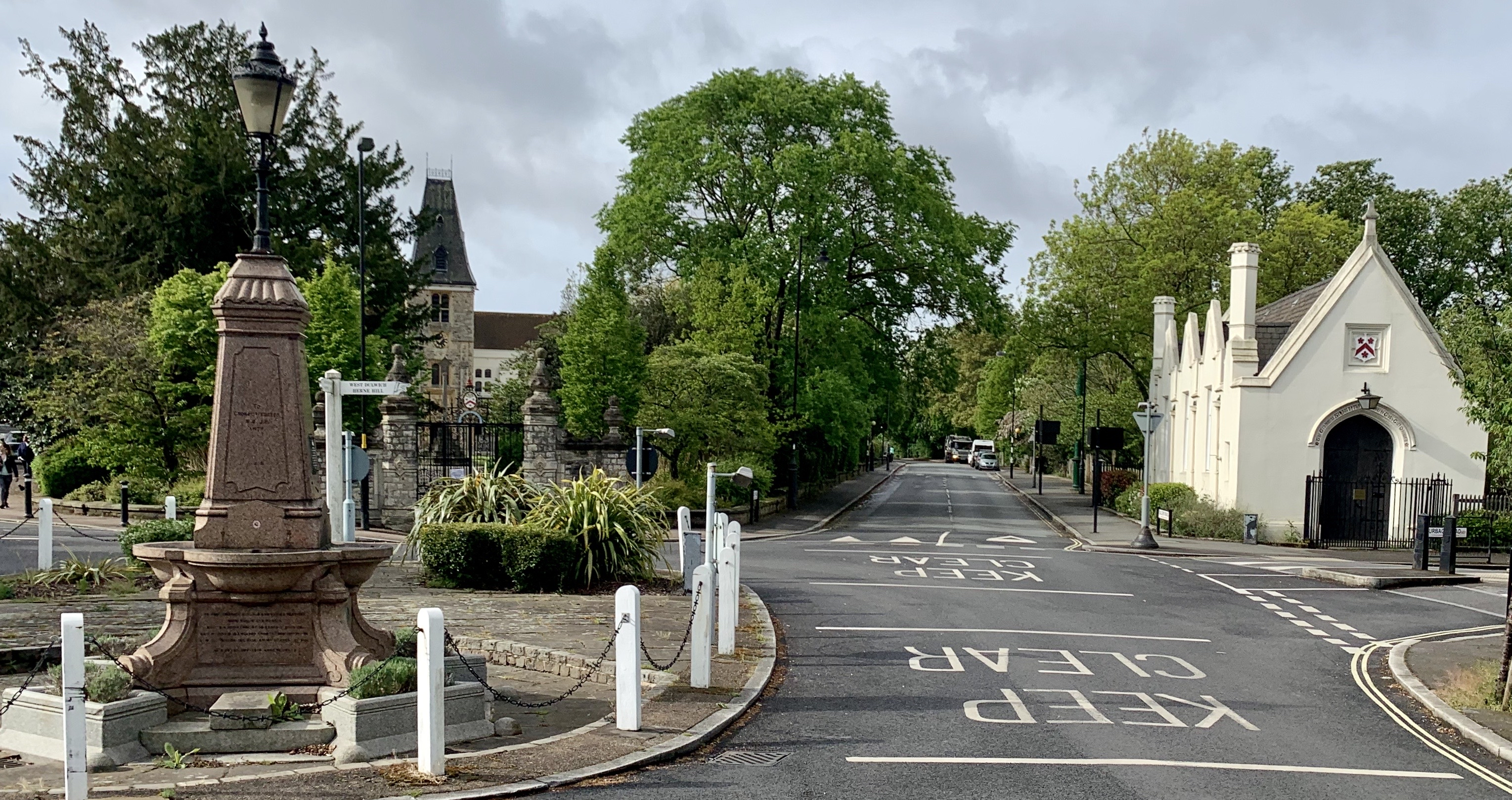
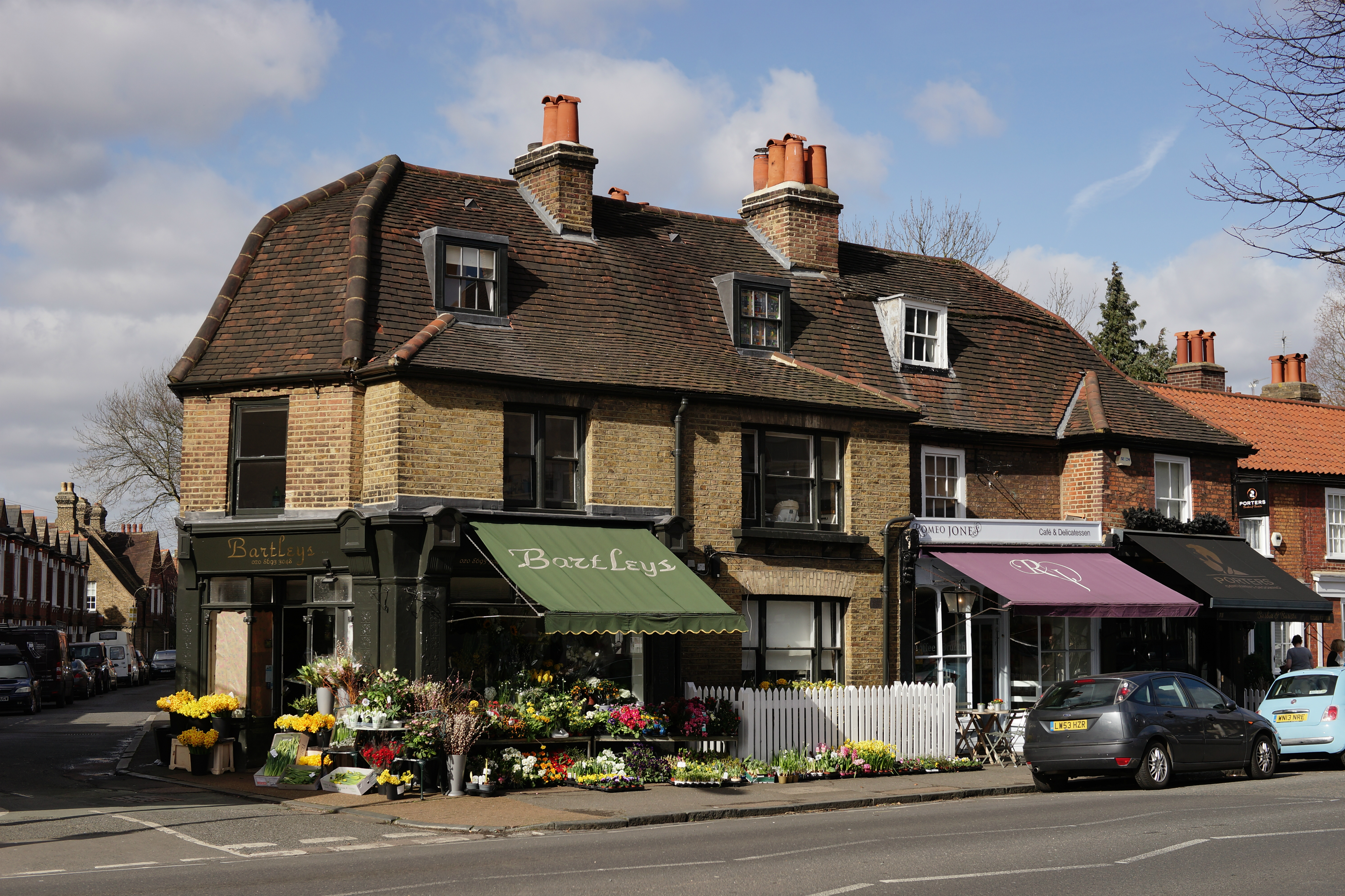
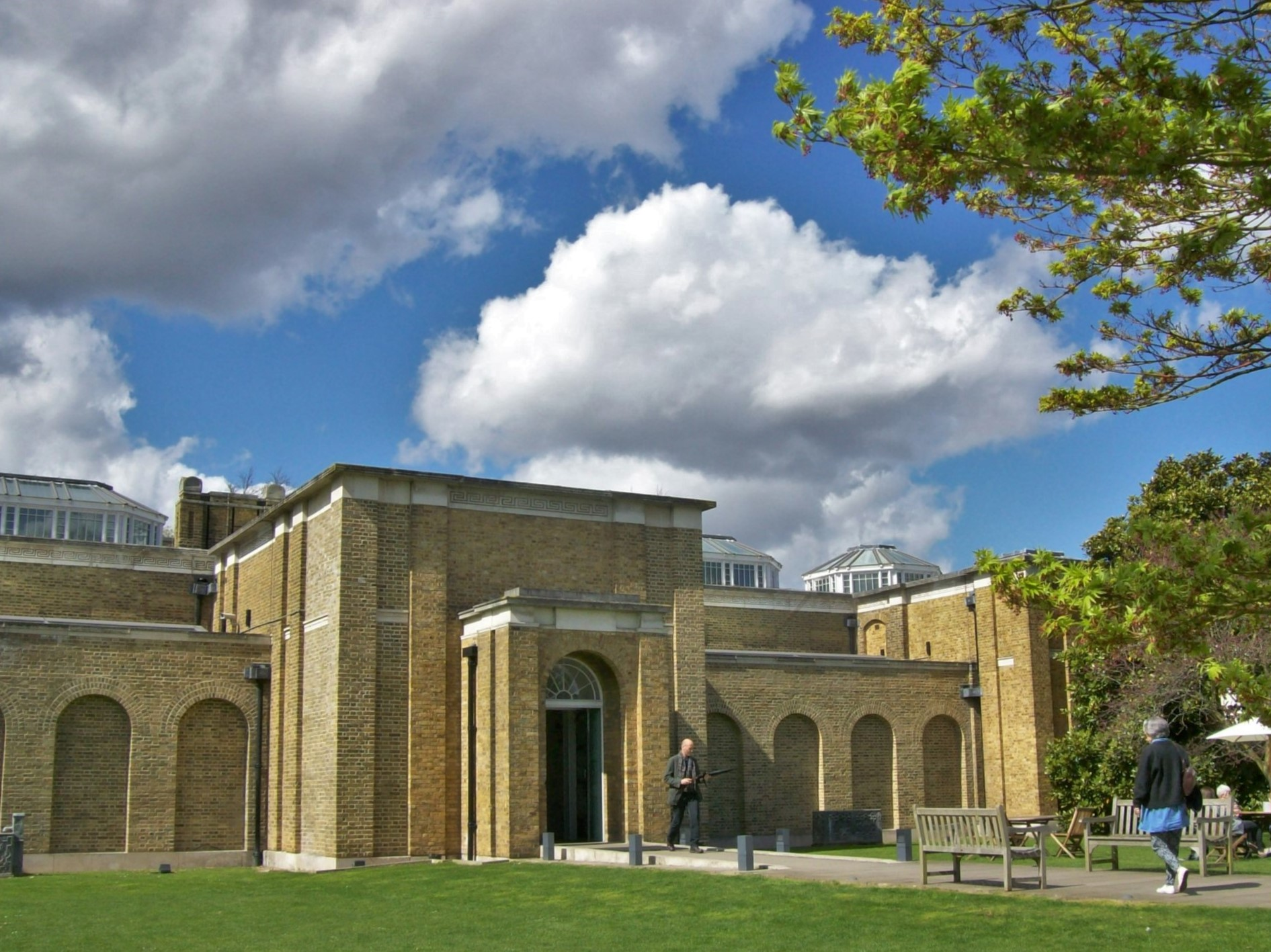
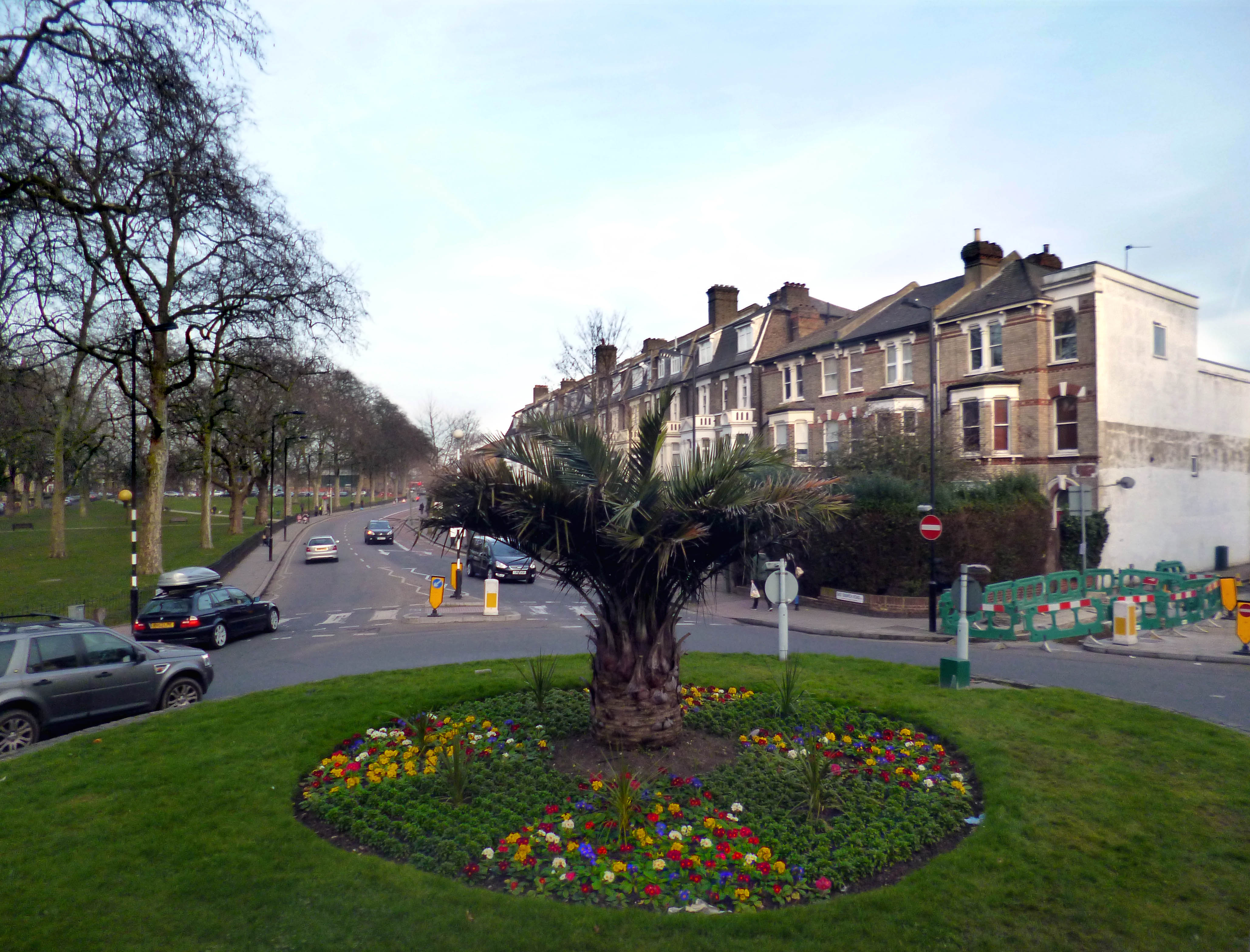
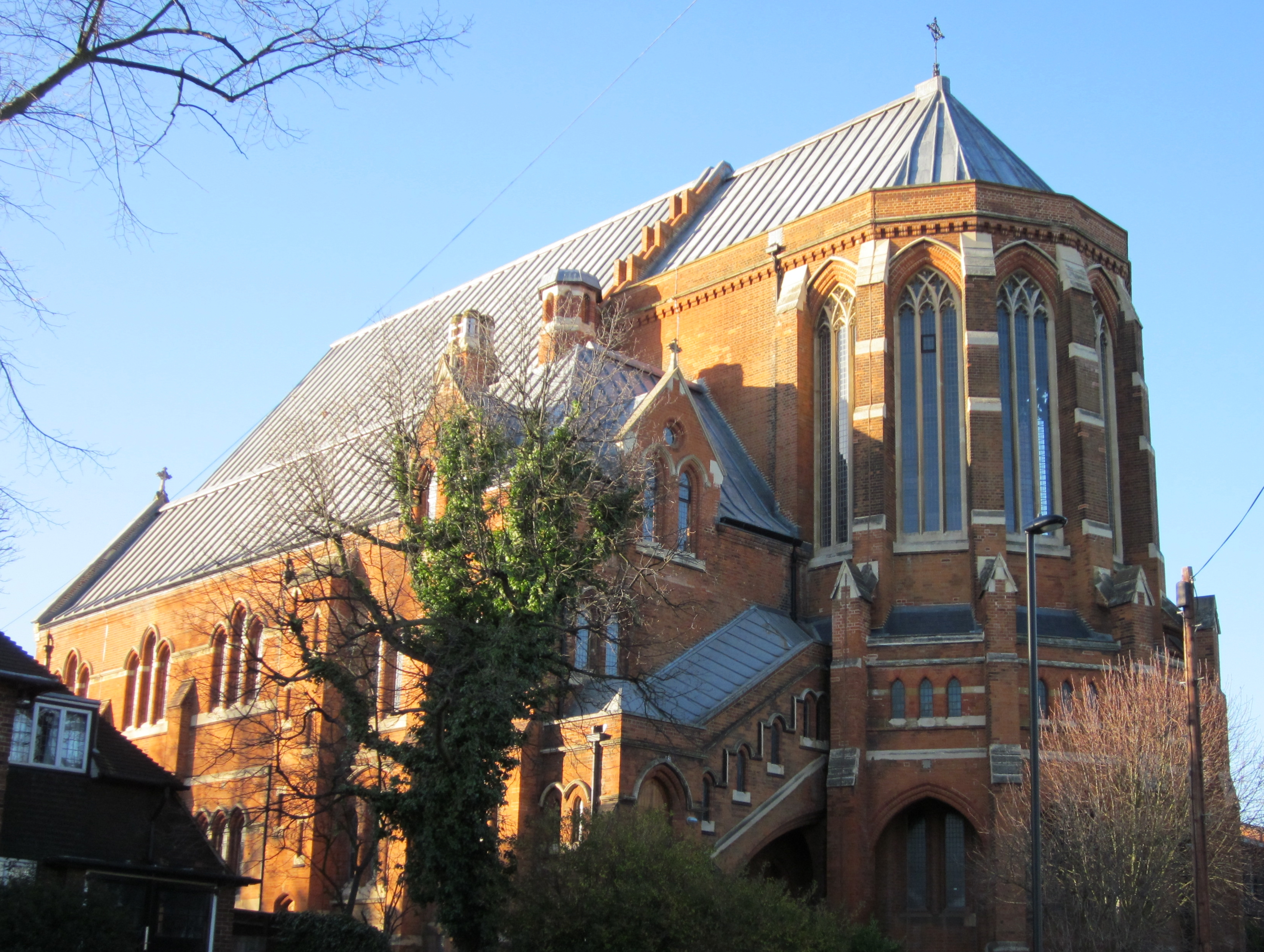
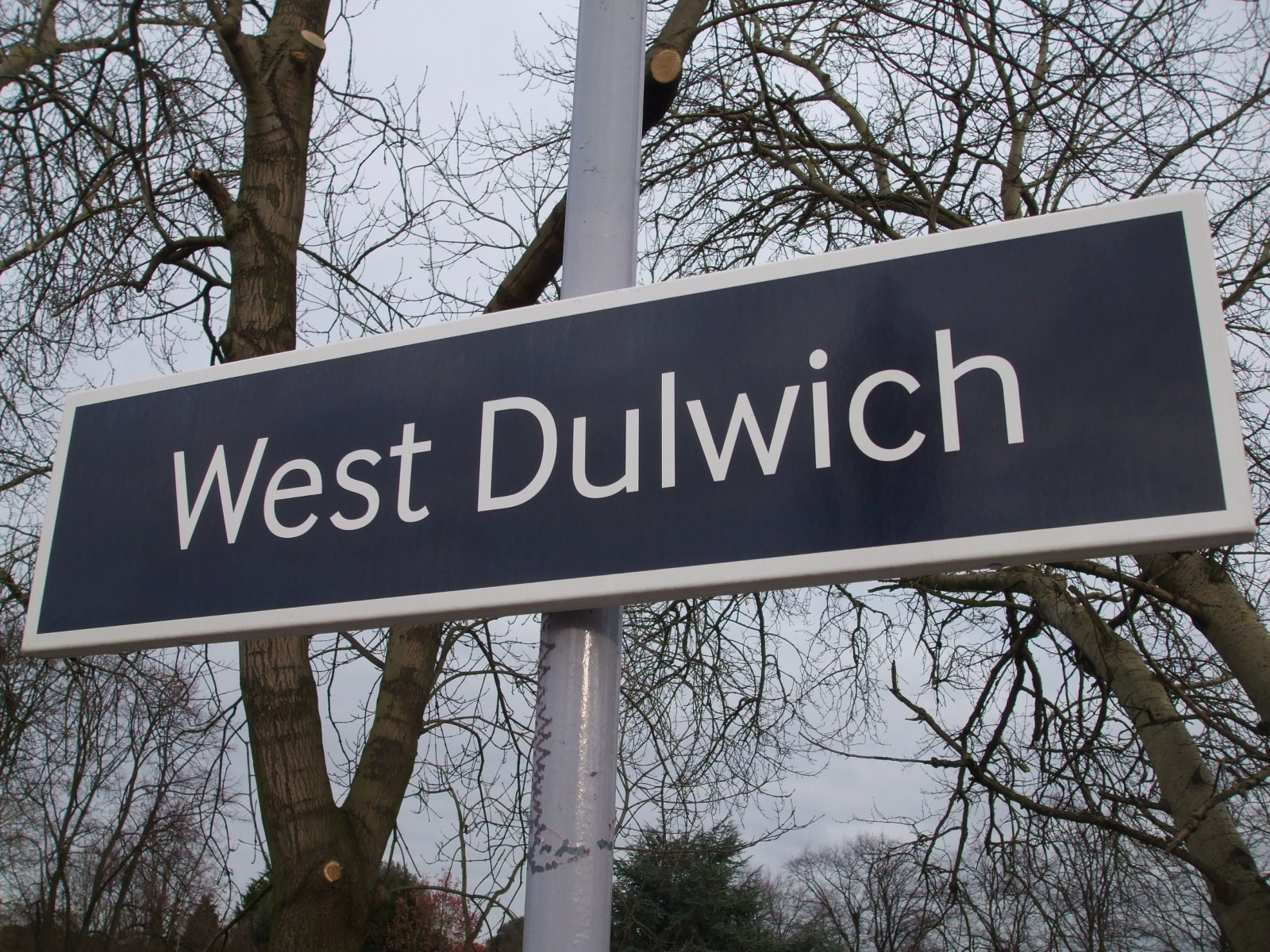
- College of God's Gift Dulwich Village Dulwich Picture Gallery East Dulwich All Saints Church West Dulwich Station

- Location within Greater London
- OS grid reference: TQ345725
- London borough: Southwark
- Ceremonial county: Greater London
- Region: London
- Country: England
- Sovereign state: United Kingdom
- Post town: LONDON
- Postcode district: SE21–SE24, SE26
- Dialling code: 020
- Police: Metropolitan
- Fire: London
- Ambulance: London
- UK Parliament: Dulwich and West Norwood
- London Assembly: Lambeth and Southwark

Dulwich (/ˈdʌlɪtʃ/; DUL-itch) is an area of south London, England. It is mostly in the London Borough of Southwark, with parts in the London Borough of Lambeth. Dulwich comprises Dulwich Village, East Dulwich, West Dulwich, and the Southwark half of Herne Hill (which is often referred to as the North Dulwich triangle). It lies in a valley between the neighbouring districts of Camberwell (to the north), Crystal Palace, Denmark Hill, Forest Hill, Peckham, Sydenham Hill, and Tulse Hill.

For the last four centuries Dulwich has been centred on the College of God's Gift, also known as the "Old College", which owned most of the land in the area today known as the Dulwich Estate. The College, founded with educational and charitable aims, established three large private schools in the 19th century (Dulwich College, Alleyn's School and James Allen's Girls' School). In recent decades four large state secondary schools have opened in the area (The Charter School East Dulwich, The Charter School North Dulwich, Kingsdale Foundation School and Harris Boys' Academy East Dulwich).

Dulwich formed part of the ancient parish of Camberwell in Surrey, which became the Metropolitan Borough of Camberwell within the County of London in 1889; in 1965, the borough was abolished and the area became part of the newly created London Borough of Southwark.

== History ==
The first documented evidence of Dulwich is as a hamlet outside London in 967 AD, granted by King Edgar to one of his thanes. The name of Dulwich has been spelt in various ways since the Medieval period: Dylways, Dullag and most commonly Dilwysshe (from dile-wisc 'meadow where the dill grew'). The land was granted in 1127 by King Henry I to Bermondsey Abbey who then owned the surrounding land. In 1333, the population of Dulwich was recorded as 100.

In 1538, Henry VIII sold the area to goldsmith Thomas Calton for £609. Calton's grandson Sir Francis Calton, due to financial reasons, sold the Manor of Dulwich for £5,000 in 1605 to Elizabethan actor and entrepreneur Edward Alleyn. He vested his wealth in a charitable foundation, the College of God's Gift, established in 1619. The charity's modern successor, The Dulwich Estate, still owns 1,500 acres (600 hectares) in the area, including a number of private roads and a tollgate. As part of the foundation, Alleyn also constructed a school, the Christ's Chapel (where Alleyn is buried) and alms houses in Dulwich (today the Dulwich Almshouse Charity). Alleyn's original school building is no longer used for that purpose, instead now housing the Estate's Governors.

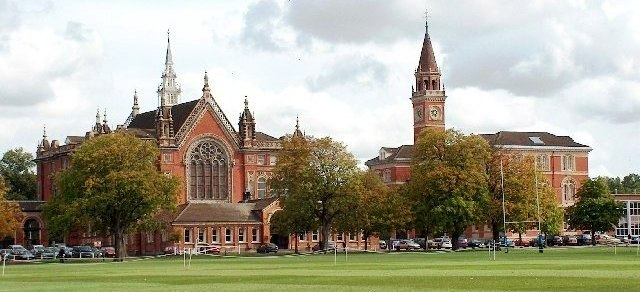
Dulwich College

In the 17th century, King Charles I of England visited Dulwich Woods on a regular basis to hunt. In 1738, a man named Samuel Bentyman was murdered in Dulwich Woods. On 5 August 1677 John Evelyn writes that he took the waters at Dulwich. The Dulwich waters were cried about in the streets of London as far back as 1678. In 1739, Mr. Cox, master of the Green Man, a tavern situated about a mile south of the village of Dulwich, sunk a well for his family. The water was found to be possessed of purgative qualities, and was for some time used medicinally. While the water was popular much custom was drawn to the adjoining tavern, and its proprietor flourished. The oak-lined formal avenue, known as Cox's Walk, leading from the junction of Dulwich Common and Lordship Lane was cut soon after 1732 by Francis Cox to connect his establishment of the Green Man Tavern and Dulwich Wells with the more popular Sydenham Wells.

By 1815 the Green Man had become a school known as Dr. Glennie's academy in Dulwich Grove, although it was demolished about ten years later. Among the pupils here there were a few who became well known, Lord Byron, General Le Marchant and Captain Barclay. Dr Glennie held Saturday evening concerts which attracted visitors from outside the family circle, such as the poet Thomas Campbell, then living in nearby Sydenham, and Robert Barker, inventor of the panorama. Following the closure of the school, the building reverted to its original use and was known as the Grove Tavern. The building has now been boarded up and neglected for many years by owners the Dulwich Estate. In 1803, Samuel Matthews – known as the "Dulwich Hermit" – was also murdered in Dulwich Woods; he was buried in Dulwich Old Cemetery. 1811–1814 saw the building of the Dulwich Picture Gallery.

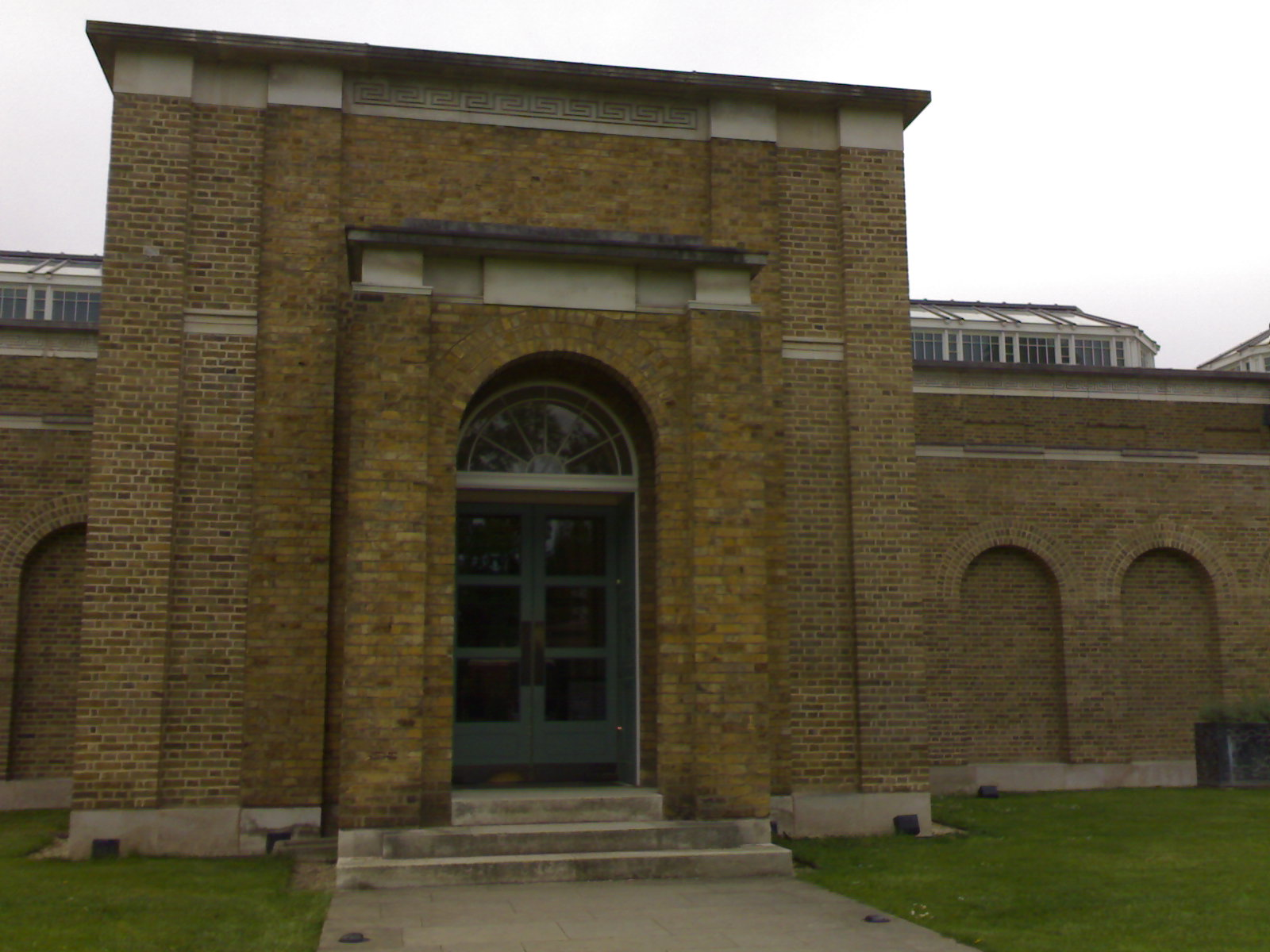
Dulwich Picture Gallery

The school founded by Alleyn expanded in 1842 into a small new building, designed by Sir Charles Barry who designed Westminster Palace, known as the Old Grammar School next to the Old College. In 1857, the foundation was restructured as part of a nationwide review of educational foundations; this resulted in a significant expansion of the school, which was split into an Upper School (later Dulwich College) that moved into new buildings designed by Charles Barry (junior) in 1870, and a Lower School (later Alleyn's School) which moved to its present day site in Townley Road in 1887.

By 1901, the population had grown to 10,247 from a smaller population of 1,632 in 1851 due to the development of railway networks and a growth in housing for the middle and working classes. In the Second World War, Dulwich was hit by many V-1 flying bombs and V-2 rockets. A possible explanation for this is that the British military when announcing V-1 and V-2 explosions deliberately gave map co-ordinates four miles north of the truth in an attempt to protect densely populated central London and focus the drops on the open spaces in the suburbs instead.

== Governance ==
Dulwich is part of the Dulwich and West Norwood constituency for elections to the House of Commons of the United Kingdom.

Dulwich is part of the Dulwich Hill, Dulwich Village and Dulwich Wood wards for elections to Southwark London Borough Council.

== Geography ==
There are a number of recognised districts in Dulwich:

- Dulwich Village which includes the traditional village centre
- West Dulwich which is a mainly residential area bordering West Norwood and Tulse Hill.
- Herne Hill (the Southwark half) which forms the North Dulwich Triangle, borders Brixton, Denmark Hill, Loughborough Junction and Tulse Hill.
- Sydenham Hill Wood and Dulwich Wood – The southern border includes Sydenham Hill station, St. Stephen's Church and the mid-century housing estates of Great Brownings and Peckarmans Wood.
- East Dulwich, also a residential area, bordering Peckham. It includes Lordship Lane.

Dulwich Village contains the original shopping street and still contains nearly all of its original 18th and 19th century buildings. It remains very uncommercialised and is a conservation zone. The village borders on Dulwich Park, where the Dulwich Horse and Motor Show is held every year.

== Sport and leisure ==
Dulwich is also home to Dulwich Hamlet F.C., founded in 1893 and competing in the Isthmian League today. They ground share with another Non-League football club Fisher F.C. at Champion Hill in East Dulwich. In the early 1990s Sainsbury's acquired the site and built Dulwich Hamlet a new ground.

The Old Alleynian Football Club is a local rugby union team originally for former pupils of Dulwich College, but is now open to all who wish to play. Alleyn Old Boys Club – former pupils of Alleyn's School – is located on Burbage Road.

Dulwich has two running clubs, namely Dulwich Park RC and Dulwich Runners.

== Local landmarks ==
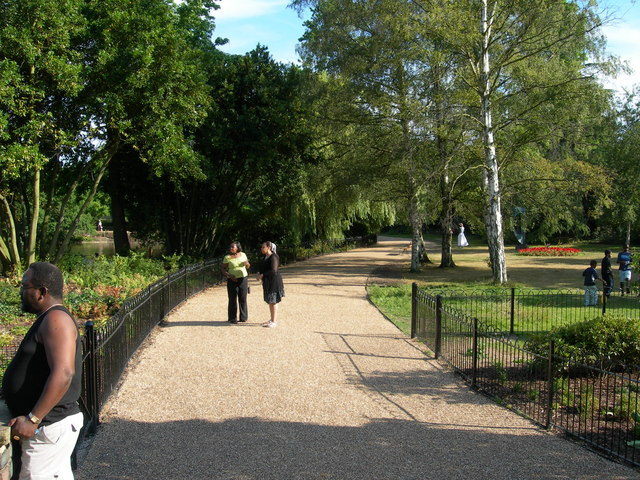
Dulwich Park in 2006

Dulwich Park was opened in 1890. It was formerly farmland, part of the Court Farm, and now offers duck and rowing ponds, children's play area, bowling green, tennis court, bridle path for horse-riding, and a café.

Dulwich Hospital in East Dulwich Grove was designed by Henry Jarvis and built on seven acres (two point eight hectares) of land purchased in East Dulwich by the Guardians of the Poor of the Parish of St Saviour, Southwark, for the price of £50,000 in 1885. At the time of opening in 1887, it offered a 723-bed capacity. It was transformed from an infirmary into the Southwark Military Hospital during World War I, when it is estimated 14,000–15,000 wounded soldiers were treated at the hospital. After the Poor Law was abolished in 1930, the Southwark Union Infirmary was renamed Dulwich Hospital and the following year an operating theatre was built. In 1964, the hospital was aligned with King's College Hospital on Denmark Hill. There is no casualty department at Dulwich at present. However, in 2015 it was announced that Dulwich Hospital was to be closed and replaced by a school.

There is a memorial fountain in Dulwich Village which is in remembrance to Dr George Webster, founder of the first British Medical Association (BMA), who worked in Dulwich from 1815 until his death in 1875.

Old Burial Ground, Dulwich Village, was created by Edward Alleyn as part of the foundation of his College of God's Gift. The Archbishop of Canterbury, George Abbot, conducted the consecration on Sunday 1 September 1616. Guests included Edmund Bowyer, Thomas Grimes and William Gresham. Thirty five Dulwich victims of the plague were buried in unmarked graves in the ground. Old Bridget, queen of the Norwood Gypsies (who appeared in the writings of Samuel Pepys) was also buried here in 1768. The ground was declared "full" in 1858, however the family of Louisa Shroeder obtained special permission for her remains to be interred in 1868. The ground's wrought iron gates and twelve tombs are Grade II listed.

The old Grammar School adjacent to the Old College and Almshouses at the junction of Burbage Road and Gallery Road was designed by Charles Barry (senior).

=== Houses ===
Belair House on the boundary between West Dulwich and Dulwich itself, is opposite West Dulwich railway station and was designed in 1785 for John Files. It remained a private house until 1938 when it came into the hands of Southwark Council. It fell into disrepair in the 1990s but was bought in 1998 and refurbished and turned into an upmarket restaurant. The house has a large park ground attached which is now public, including tennis courts and a children's play area. This area used to be the fields for its farm. The lake is the only substantial stretch of the ancient River Effra remaining above ground.

Bell House (Dulwich) in College Road was designed in 1767 for Thomas Wright, a stationer and later Lord Mayor of the City of London. A large extension was added in the mid-19th century and it is accompanied by a lodge house. The house is Grade II listed. Its name comes from its Bell Tower situated on top of the original house and the bell was restored in the late 1990s. It became a Dulwich College boarding house in 1926 and only returned to private ownership in 1993. The house was bought in the summer of 2016 by an educational charity.

One of the area's most famous residents and architects was Sir George Frederick Ellyatt (founder of the architecture practice, Ellyatt & Porter). He was responsible for the design or influence of in excess of 25 homes in the area, each built in its own individual style. One of the most notable homes was Crossways, 1 Dulwich Village, which he built as his own home following being granted permission to do so in January 1927 at a cost of just over £2000 and with a ground rent of £22 10s per annum. Uniquely, Ellyatt sought and was granted permission to build in 9" solid brick walls rather than 11" cavity walls (as was usual convention) as long as he used cement mortar. The site was originally occupied by a Georgian built home, known locally as "the Hall" which had become partially derelict during World War I and was demolished in 1925. Crossways still exists in substantially the same manner and form as when it was originally built.

The Dulwich Wood and Sydenham Hill area contains mid-century housing estates designed by Austin Vernon and Partners for the Dulwich Estate. Examples include Peckarmans Wood and Great Brownings.

=== "The Village" Centre ===
The Crown and Greyhound public house is on the high street in Dulwich Village, and it includes hotel rooms. In the 19th century, two separate pubs stood in this area – the centre of Dulwich Village. The Crown was for the labourers of the area, while the Greyhound across the road, was for local gentry. The Greyhound was a coach stop on the London Piccadilly-Sittingbourne route. Charles Dickens was a frequent visitor to the village and used to drink at The Greyhound pub. The current pub, known locally as "The Dog", is a Grade II listed building. In the 1960s, it used to be known as the venue of the "Dulwich Poets".

Other popular spots include Gail's cafe, Megan's, Redemption Roasters, and Italian restaurant Rocca Di Papa. There is also a local wine shop, butcher and a green grocer.

=== Churches ===
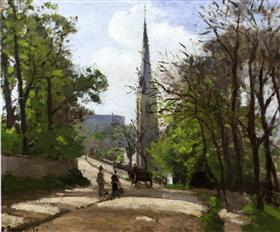
St Stephen's Church by Camille Pissarro, 1870

All Saints Church, West Dulwich (Church of England) alongside Rosendale Road is a Victorian Gothic building, originally intended to be the cathedral for south London. The church was built between 1888 and 1897 and designed by George Fellowes Prynne, a pupil of George Edmund Street. Although plans were scaled down it was still a huge building and is a Grade I listed building. Unfortunately it was gutted by a huge fire on 9 June 2000, the cause remains unknown. The building reopened in April 2006 after a three-year restoration project.

St Barnabas' Church (Church of England) lies on Calton Avenue at the edge of Dulwich Village. The old church was designed by W H Wood of Newcastle upon Tyne and consecrated in 1894. However the original church burnt down in an arson attack by 'unknown persons' on Monday 7 December 1992. The "Phoenix appeal" raised money to build a new church and the replacement structure, designed by Larry Malcic with an all-glass spire, was opened in 1996.

Grace Church Dulwich is situated on Turney Road and was built in 1900. The church is currently a conservative evangelical Church of England church and meets on Sunday mornings at 10:30. The building is otherwise home to Rosendale School.

In the south, the spire of St. Stephen's Church can be seen above the trees of Dulwich Wood, adjacent to Sydenham Hill railway station.

== Transport ==
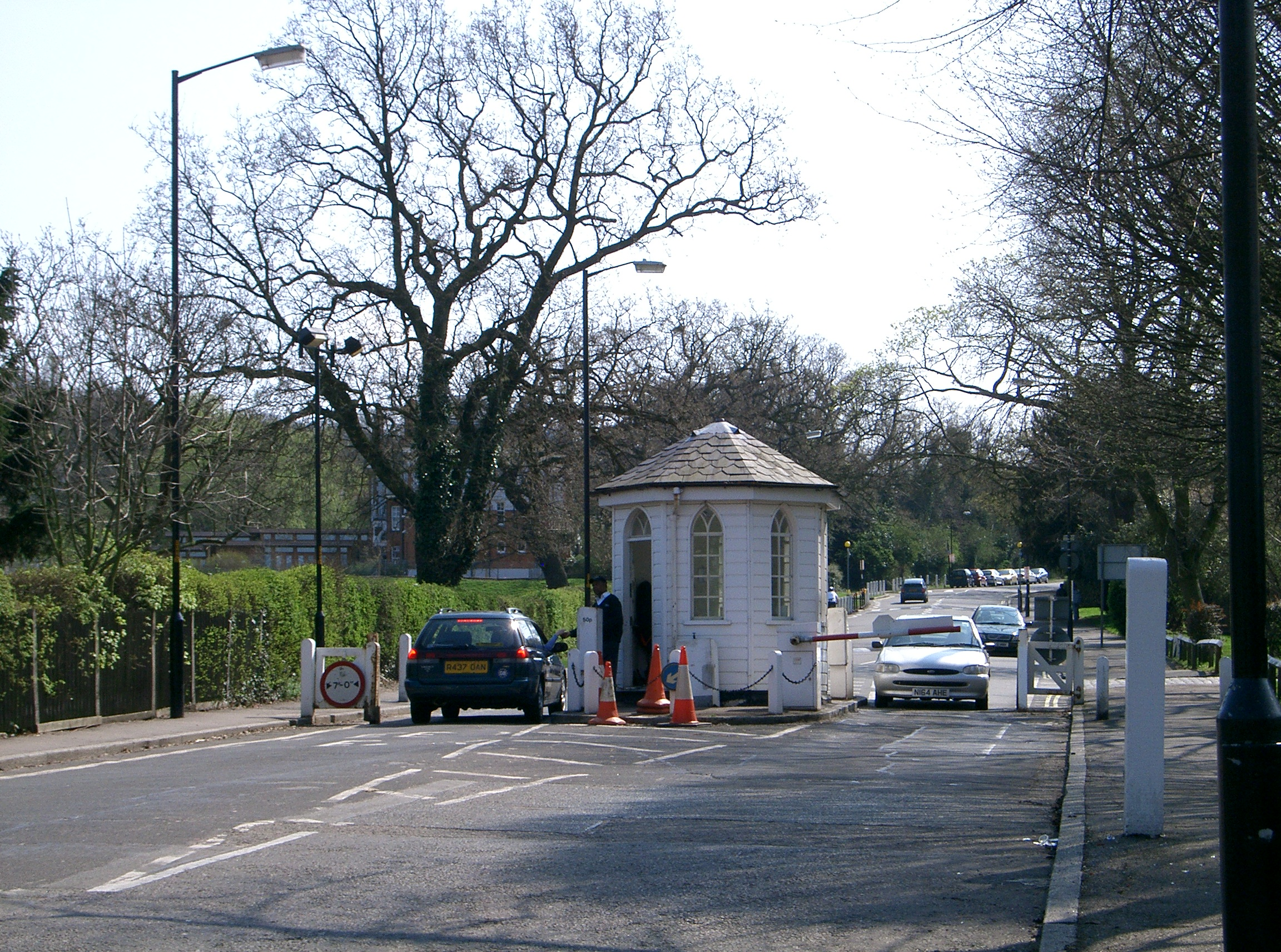
Paying the toll at the College Road, Dulwich, London SE21 tollgate, which dates back to 1789

Dulwich sits astride the South Circular (A205), one of London's Ring Roads. Also passing through the area is the A2199 and College Road, which features a working tollgate dating back to 1789.

The journey to London Victoria from West Dulwich takes about 12 minutes and there are direct trains to and from London Blackfriars and points north on the Thameslink line during the morning and evening peak periods respectively, East Dulwich is 12 minutes from London Bridge and North Dulwich is 14 minutes from London Bridge. The nearest stations are in: Denmark Hill, East Dulwich, West Dulwich, North Dulwich, Gipsy Hill, Herne Hill, Peckham Rye, Sydenham Hill and Tulse Hill.

Dulwich is served by London Buses routes 3, 12, 37, 40, 42, 176, 185, 197, 201, 363, 484, 450, P4 and P13.

== Notable residents ==
Famous people born in the area include: artist Madge Tennent in 1889; the author Enid Blyton in 1897; the first compiler of the London A–Z, Phyllis Pearsall in East Dulwich in 1906, she went on to live in Dulwich Village; code breaker Mavis Batey, then Mavis Lever, was born in Dulwich on May 5, 1921; the war-time singer Anne Shelton who lived on Court Lane until shortly before her death in 1994; also on Court Lane, Dr Reginald John Gladstone FRSE embryologist, lived here until his house was destroyed in the blitz in 1941; footballer Trevor Sinclair in 1973; the actor Tim Roth in 1961; the television personality Lisa Vanderpump in 1960; actress Sally Hawkins in 1976 and actor Angus Castle-Doughty in 1995.

In 1980, Bon Scott, the lead singer of AC/DC, after a night's heavy drinking, was found lifeless in a car outside 67 Overhill Road, East Dulwich. He was rushed to hospital but was dead on arrival at King's College Hospital.

The Village has also long been popular with people in show business; Ronnie Corbett lived there for years. Carl Barât, Libertines lead singer, lives on Lordship Lane. Ronnie Reed, who ran double agents during the Second World War, and was an MI5 officer from 1940 to 1976, lived in Court Lane Gardens from 1960 to 1995. Huw Edwards, the former BBC News at Ten newsreader, resides in Dulwich. Actor Iain Glen also lives in the village.

Dulwich has also been home to several Members of Parliament and senior Civil Servants. Margaret Thatcher bought a house in a "gated community" in Dulwich after her time as Prime Minister of the United Kingdom. Edward George, Baron George, governor of the Bank of England and himself an Old Alleynian, lived in Gilkes Crescent just off the Village until his retirement. Ian McColl, Baron McColl of Dulwich who served as John Major's Parliamentary Private Secretary in the House of Lords, also lives there.

Admiral Sir Michael Boyce, a former Chief of the Defence Staff, lived in Woodwarde Road and Sir John Scarlett, head of MI6, lived just off the South Circular Road. Harriet Harman MP lives in Winterbrook Road, Albert Booth MP, Secretary of State for Employment under James Callaghan, lived on the corner of Woodwarde Road and Desenfans Road and Sir Robin Butler, secretary to the Cabinet, lived in Half Moon Lane.

In the closing chapter of Charles Dickens' romance The Pickwick Papers, Samuel Pickwick retires to a house in Dulwich, "one of the most pleasant spots near London."

== Gallery ==
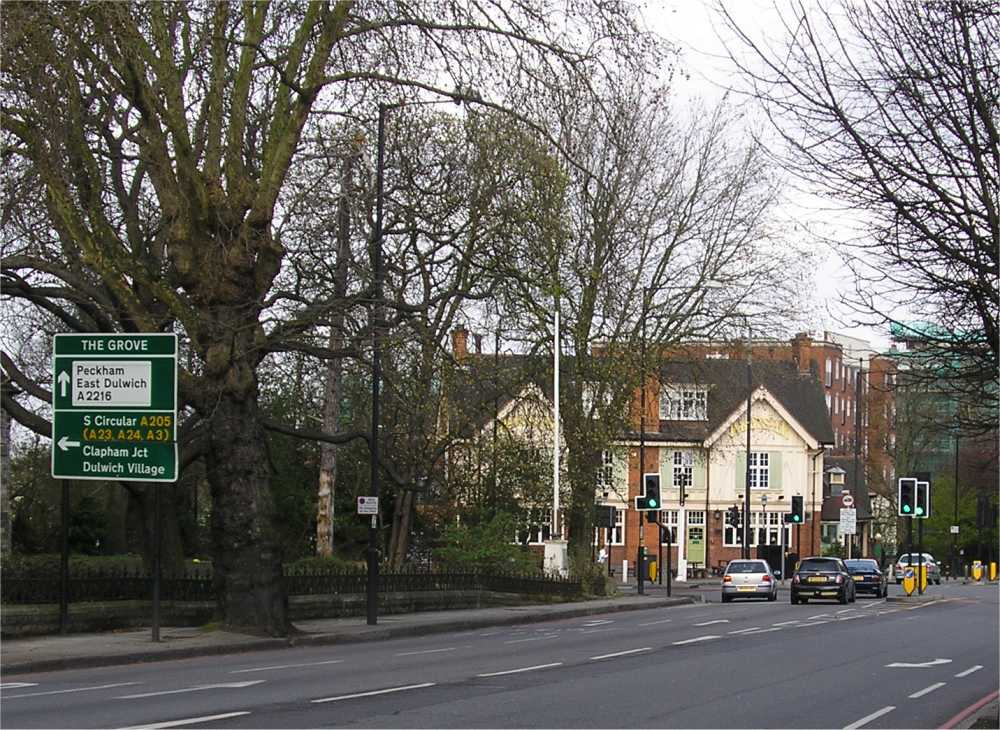
The Grove Tavern, public house, located on the busy South Circular road

A map showing the Dulwich wards of Camberwell Metropolitan Borough as they appeared in 1916

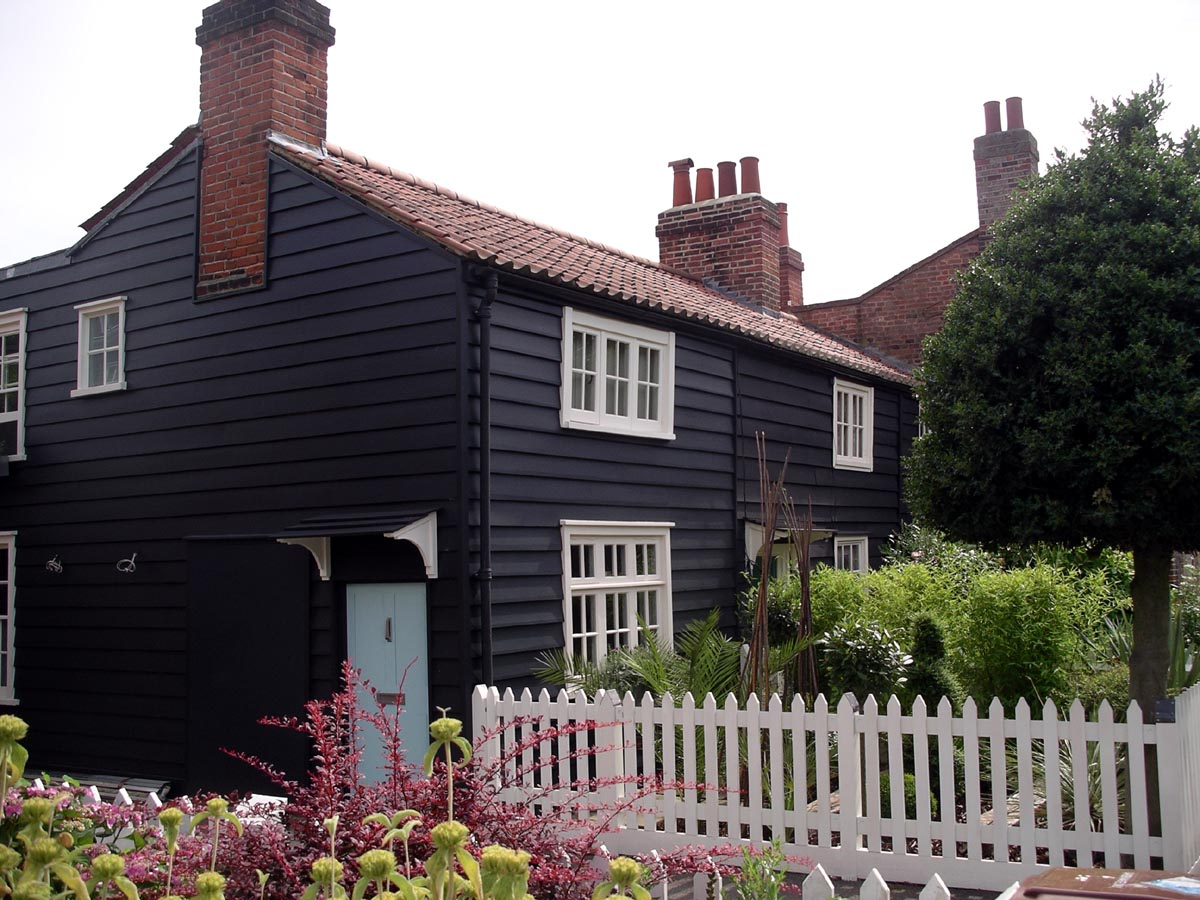
An old house in Dulwich village

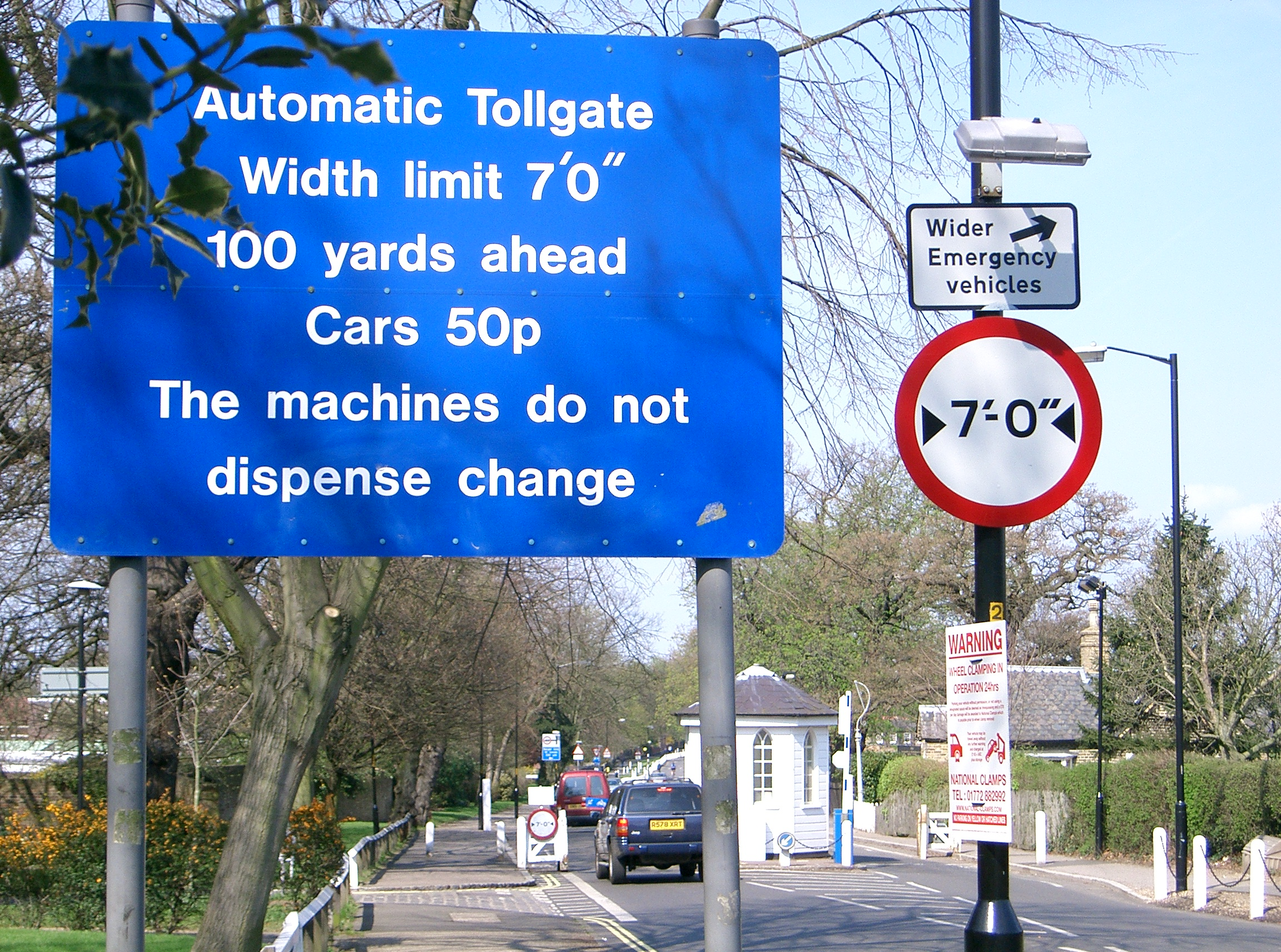
The tollgate on College Road, Dulwich, London SE21

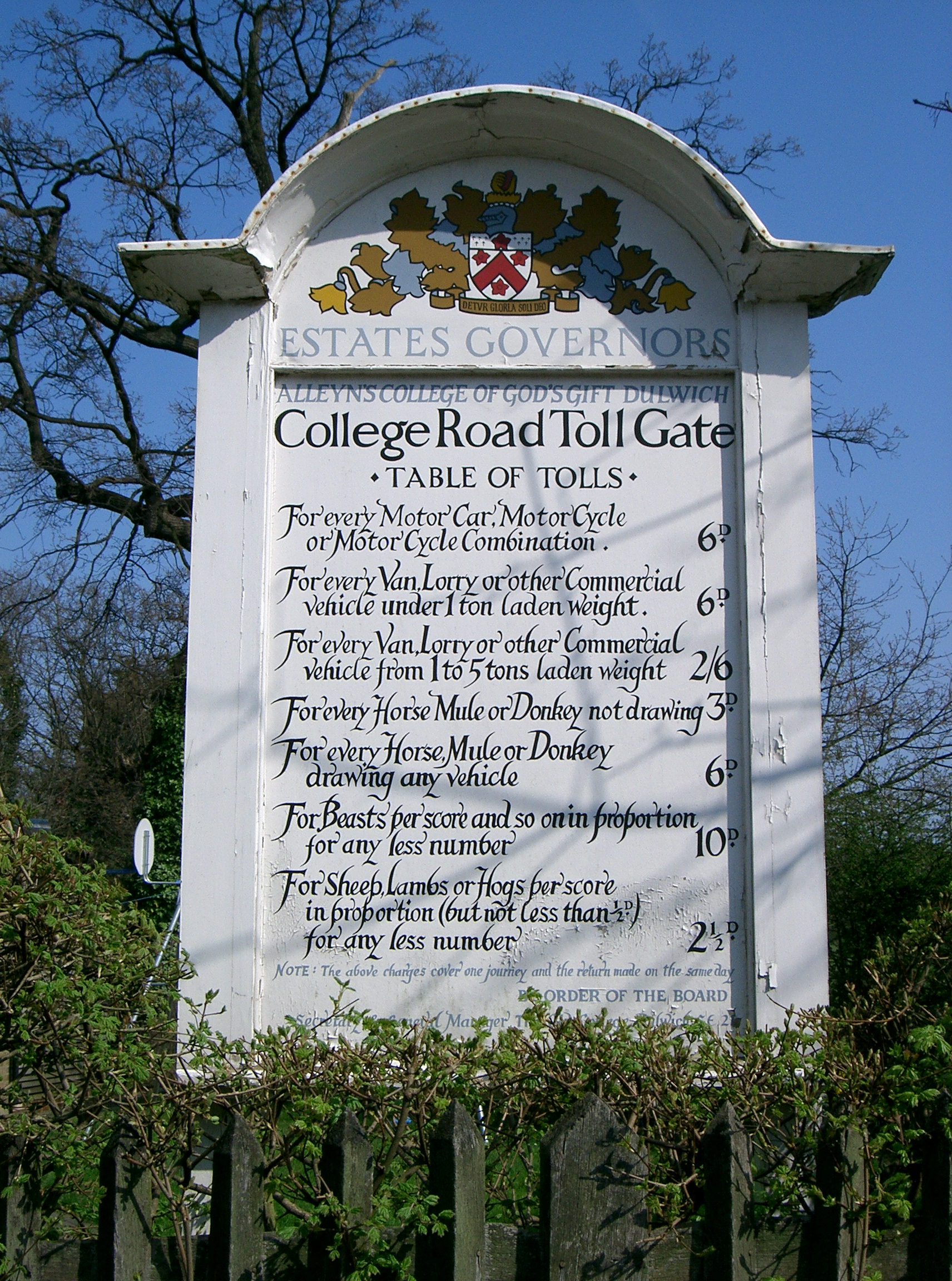
A table of tolls in pre-decimal currency for the College Road, Dulwich, London SE21 tollgate

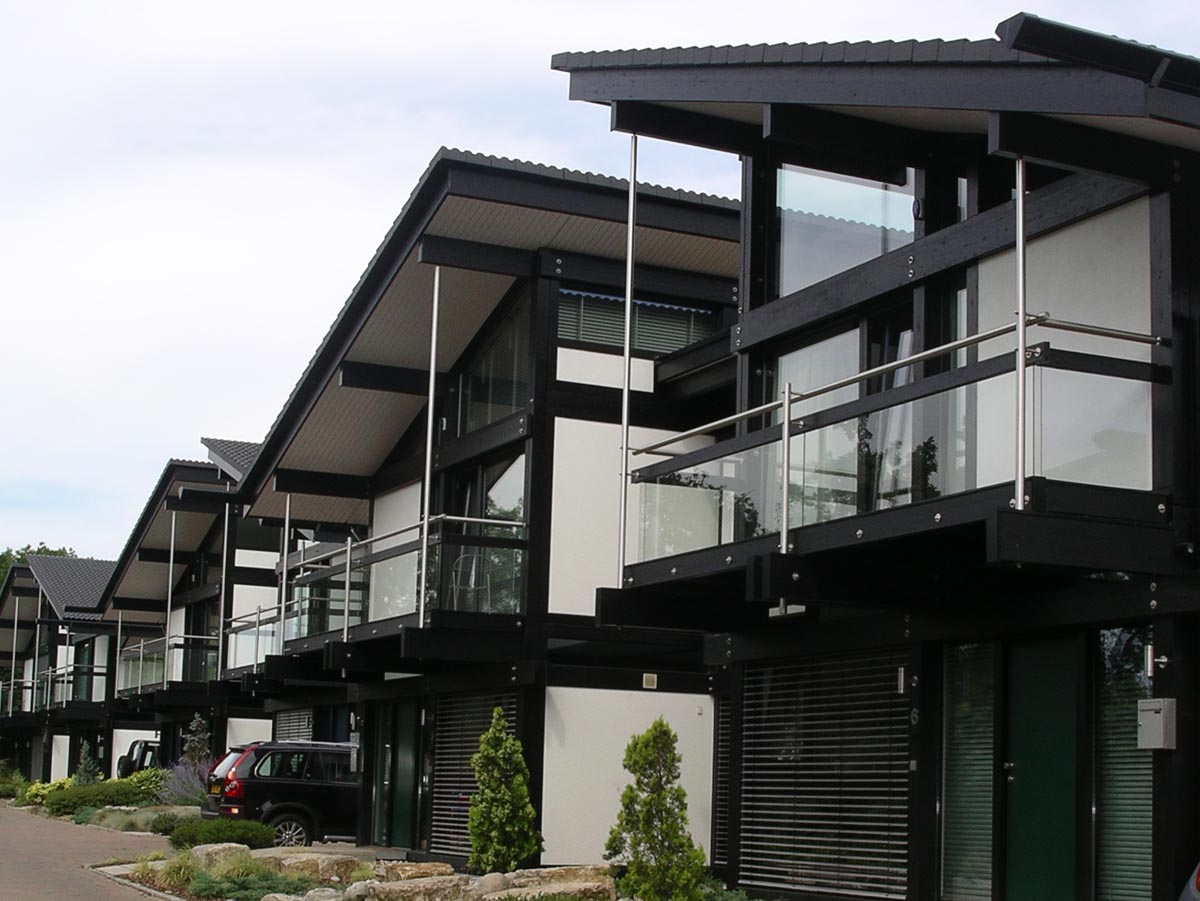
Modern housing in Dulwich village

== See also ==
- Dulwich Estate
- Dulwich OnView, a local virtual community
