= Gerald Wells =

Gerald Wells may refer to:

- Gerry Wells (1929–2014), British radio enthusiast and collector
- Gerald Wells (Royal Navy officer) (died 1943)
