= Gallery Road =

Road in Dulwich, London

Coordinates: 51.4443°N 0.0879°W

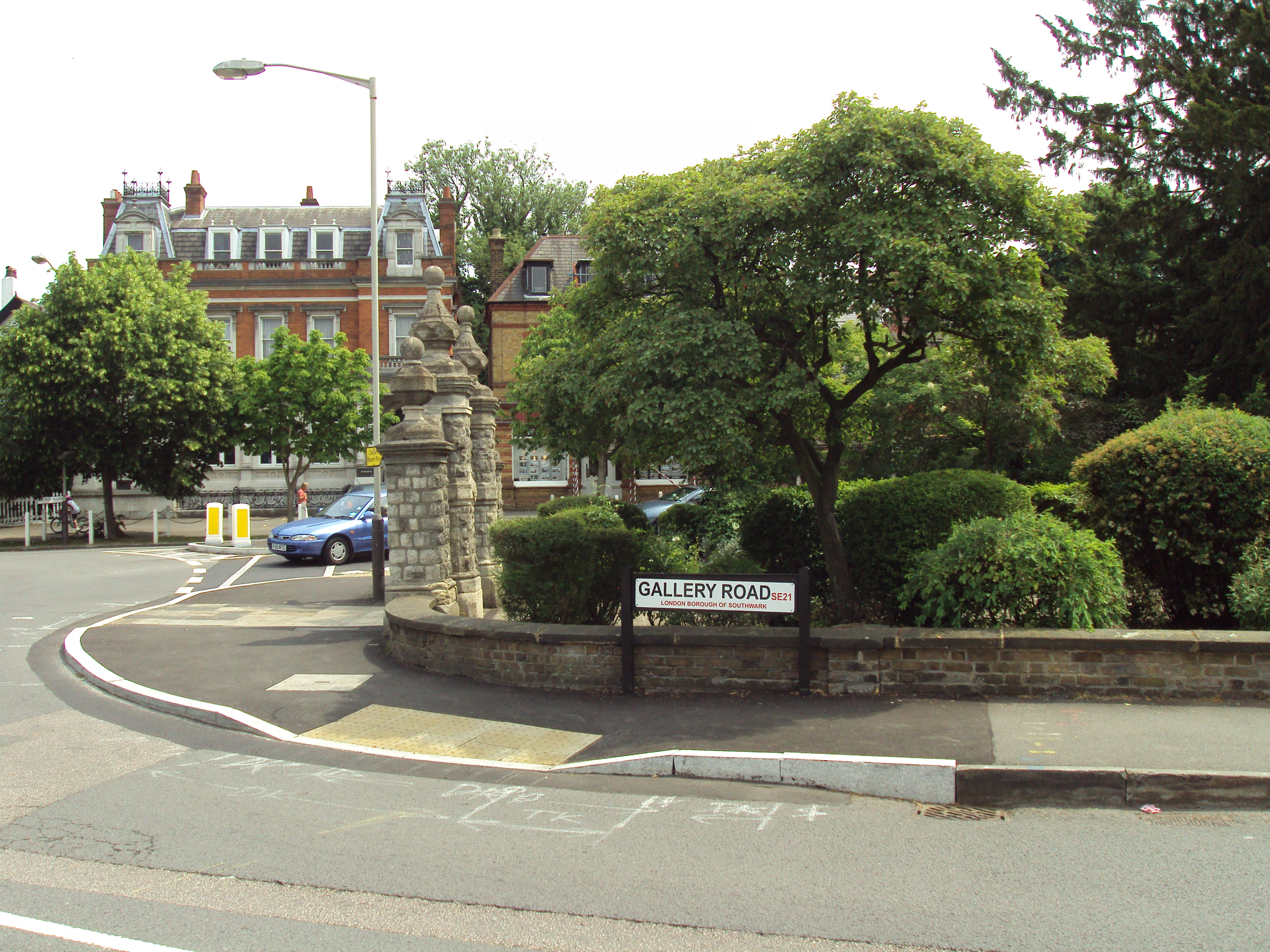
The north end of Gallery Road, looking east.

Gallery Road is in West Dulwich, Southwark, southeast London, England.

== Location ==
At the southern end is a junction with the Dulwich Common A205 road, close to West Dulwich railway station. To the east is Dulwich Picture Gallery, hence the name. Dulwich Park lies to the east beyond that. Also on the east side of the road is the Old College Lawn Tennis & Croquet Club. To the west is Belair Park and the London South Bank University Sports Ground. The Lloyd's Register Cricket Club is also located on the road. To the north is Dulwich Village, the historic centre of Dulwich.

== Photographic gallery ==
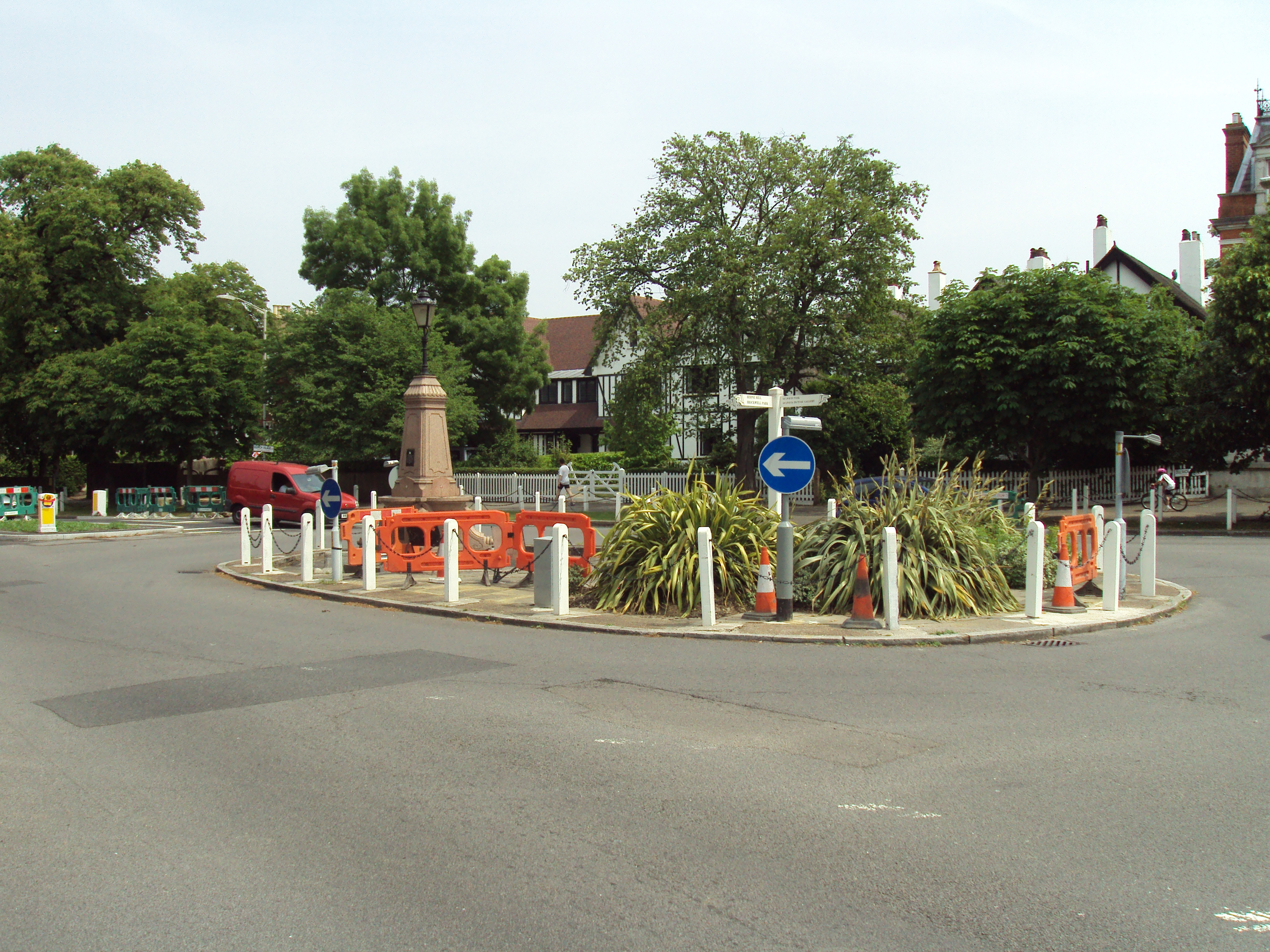
Roundabout at the north end of Gallery Road at the junction with Dulwich Village.

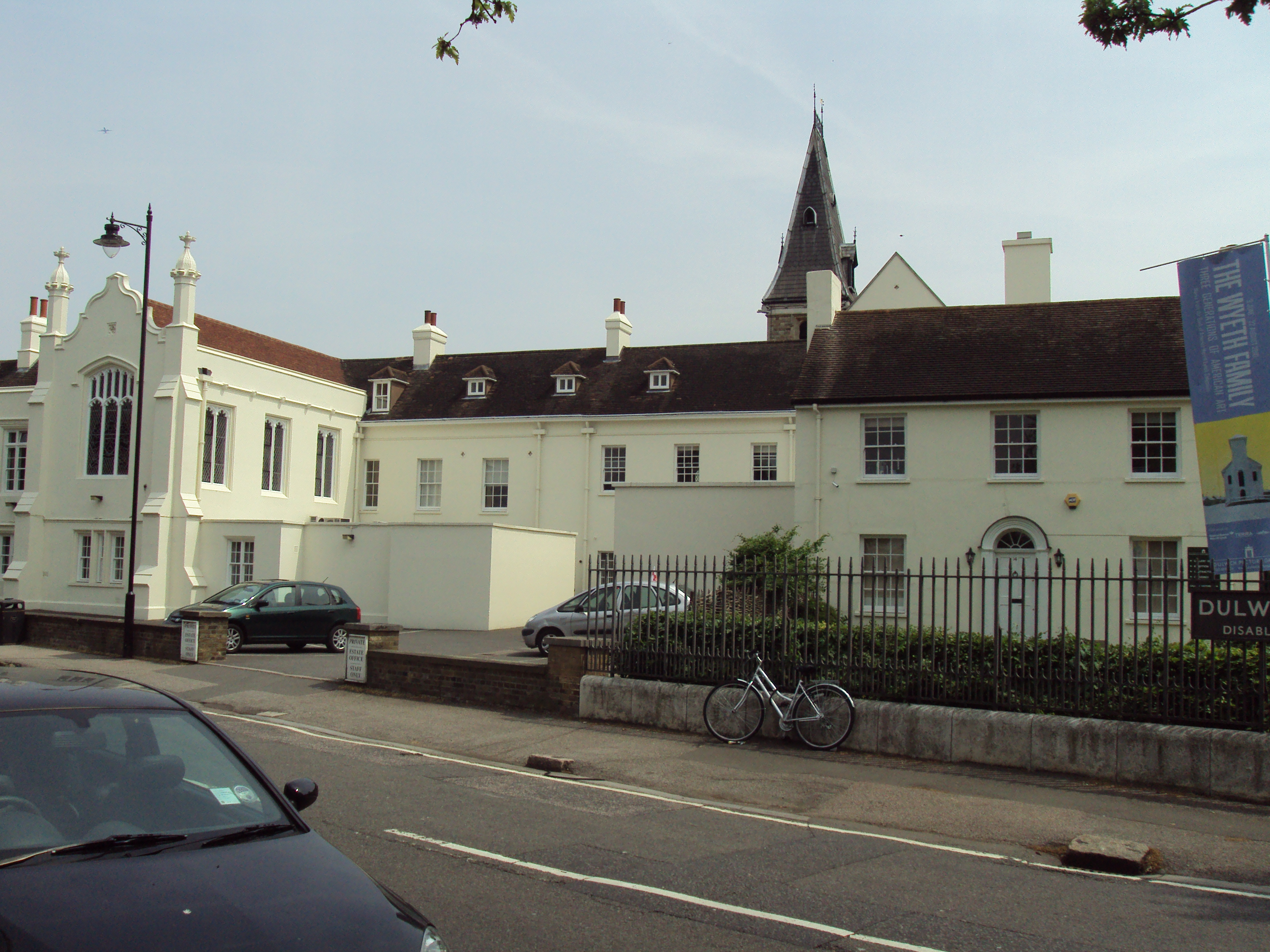
Look towards the Dulwich Estate from Gallery Road.

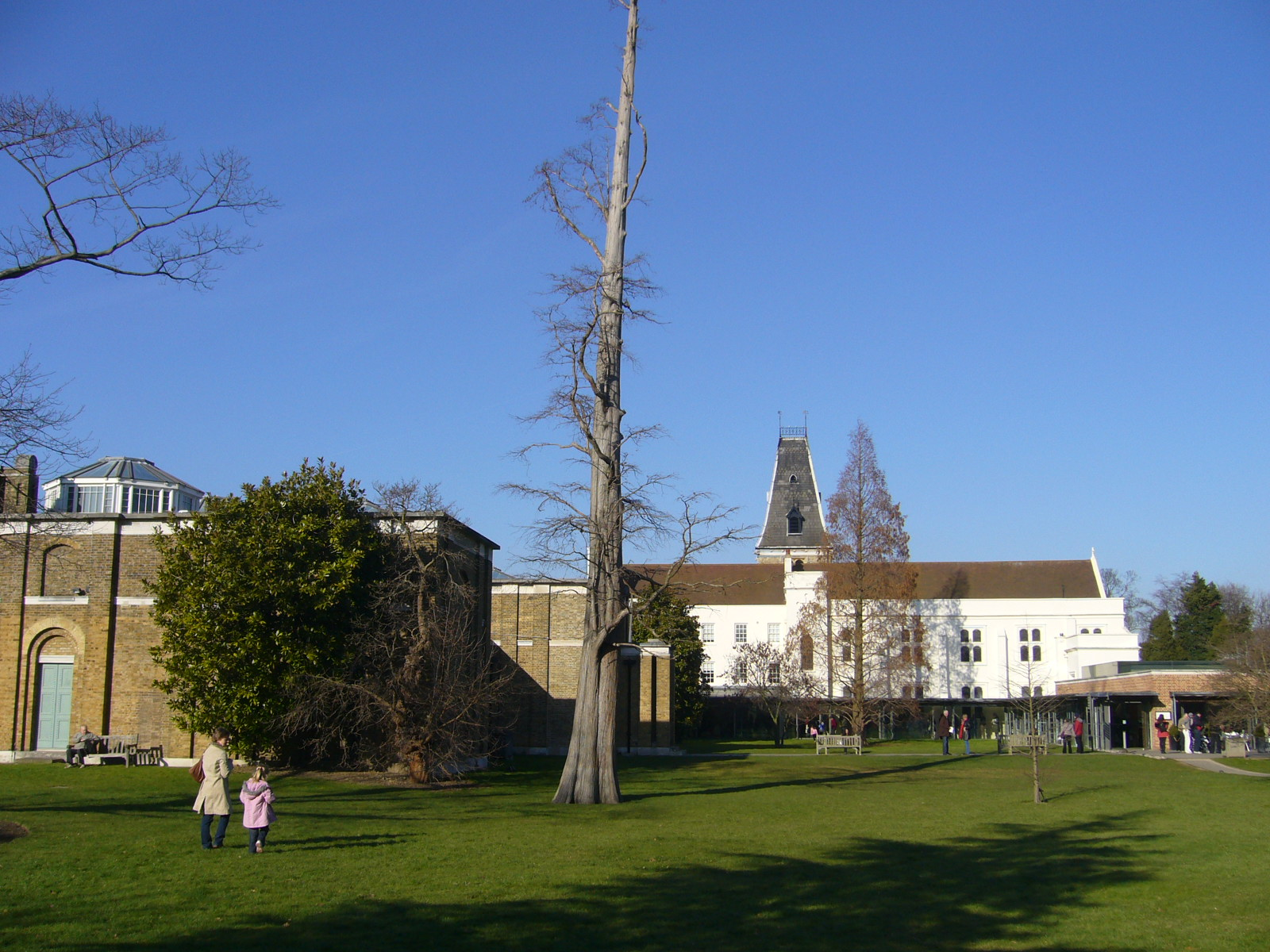
View of Dulwich Picture Gallery, off Gallery Road.
