= West Dulwich =

Area of South London, England

Coordinates: 51.43333°N 0.08333°W

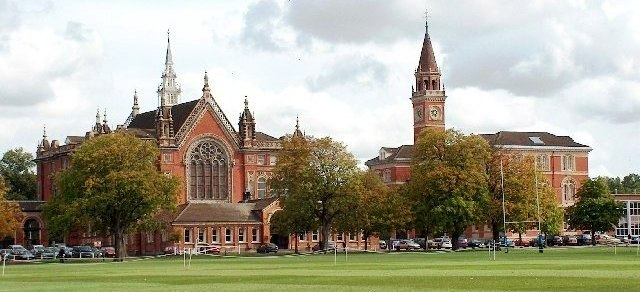
- Dulwich College

- Location within Greater London
- OS grid reference: TQ333722
- London borough: Southwark; Lambeth
- Ceremonial county: Greater London
- Region: London
- Country: England
- Sovereign state: United Kingdom
- Post town: LONDON
- Postcode district: SE21, SE24
- Dialling code: 020
- Police: Metropolitan
- Fire: London
- Ambulance: London
- UK Parliament: Dulwich and West Norwood
- London Assembly: Lambeth and Southwark

West Dulwich (/ˈdʌlɪtʃ/ DUL-itch) is a neighbourhood in South London on the southern boundary of Brockwell Park, which straddles the London Borough of Lambeth and the London Borough of Southwark. Croxted Road and South Croxted Road mark the boundary between Southwark to the east and Lambeth to the west. The suburb of West Dulwich dates back to the 17th century when the often flooded land known as Dulwich Common was acquired and drained by Edward Alleyn's estate.

West Dulwich has two main parades of shops, the main one being on the Park Hall road junction, where Croxted Road becomes South Croxted Road and the other on Rosendale Road.

== Buildings of interest ==
In addition to the College, other buildings of interest are Belair House; the Grade I listed All Saints Church, West Dulwich, home of the Lambeth Orchestra, which burned down in 2000 but reopened on the same site in 2006 thanks to the sustained work of parishioners and the local community; Kingswood House, a Grade II Victorian mansion; and The Rosendale pub, which is a historic coaching house that still retains the original Royal Doulton tiles. It was redeveloped into a gastropub and was awarded the title of TimeOut London Best Gastropub 2007.

== Transport ==
=== Buses ===
The London bus routes are 3, 201, 322, P4, P13, school route 690 and night bus N3.

=== Rail ===
Direct rail services are available from West Dulwich railway station to Victoria (via the Southeastern Metro Bromley South line) as well as limited service to Blackfriars at peak hours.

Nearby railway stations offer services to other destinations: London Bridge can be reached from the nearby North Dulwich or Tulse Hill stations by the Southern Metro via Peckham Rye line. The nearest London Underground station is Brixton on the Victoria line.

== Green spaces ==
Belair Park is located in West Dulwich, and Brockwell Park, Dulwich Park and Dulwich Wood are all within walking distance of West Dulwich.

The Rosendale Allotments, which were established in 1908, are on an 18-acre (73,000 m^{2}) site owned by the Dulwich Estate in West Dulwich between Herne Hill and Knight's Hill.

The Old College Lawn Tennis and Croquet Club is on the east side of Gallery Road.

== Knight's Hill ==
There are two areas called Knight's Hill nearby; the better known area is the residential area and electoral ward in West Norwood by the road called Knights Hill. However, there is a hill to the north, in West Dulwich, near Thurlow Park Road, known as Knight's Hill, in which is the Knight's Hill railway tunnel. This second Knight's Hill includes the hilly land between the western end of Thurlow Park Road (South Circular), Peabody Hill and Lovelace Road, where the adjoining Rosendale allotments in Dulwich stand today. The green area is still marked as Knight's Hill on detailed maps, but to avoid confusion is not normally named on modern street maps.

Both areas have similar origins, first mentioned as belonging to Thomas Knyght in 1545, and were known as Knight's Hill Common and Knight's Hill Farm, respectively. The train line between North Dulwich railway station and Tulse Hill railway station runs through the hill. Today, the Peabody Hill estate lies on the western side of Tulse Hill, with the Rosendale Road allotments on the top.

== Politics ==
West Dulwich forms part of the Dulwich and West Norwood constituency, whose current member of Parliament is Helen Hayes of the Labour Party. At the local government level, West Dulwich is split between Dulwich Village and Dulwich Wood wards in the London Borough of Southwark, and West Dulwich ward in London Borough of Lambeth.

Dulwich was traditionally a Conservative ward, but as of the 2018 local elections, all wards comprising the West Dulwich area were represented by Labour councillors.

For the 2022 Lambeth London Borough Council election, the area became part of the West Dulwich ward.

== Schools ==
West Dulwich has four state primary schools (Rosendale Primary School and three others) and one secondary school, Kingsdale Foundation School. There are a number of private schools in or near the area: Dulwich College, Dulwich Prep London, Oakfield Preparatory School, and Rosemead Preparatory School.

== Sport and leisure ==
West Dulwich has a Non-League football club, Wanderers F.C., who play at Belair Park. The club is famous for winning the FA Cup five times between 1872 and 1878.

== Timeline ==
=== Saxon Dulwich ===
967 – Edgar the Peaceful granted Dilwihs to a thane named Earl Aelfheah. Dilwihs meant 'meadow where the dill grew'.

=== Medieval Dulwich ===
1066 – King William I of England became owner of Dulwich, taking the land from King Harold II of England

Lordship Lane was the eastern boundary of Dulwich Manor with Friern Manor and Croxted Road (formerly Croks Street Lane) the western boundary with Lord Thurlow's estate.

=== Tudor Dulwich ===
1538 – Dulwich ceased to be the property of Bermondsey Abbey following the abbey's dissolution.

1544 – Dulwich was granted to goldsmith Thomas Calton for £609 by Henry VIII.

=== Stuart Dulwich ===
1605 – The estate was sold for £4,900 to Edward Alleyn by Sir Francis Calton.

1619 – Dulwich College was founded by Edward Alleyn.

=== Georgian Dulwich ===
1785 – Belair House was built (probably by architect Henry Holland).

1805 (+1814) – Dulwich Common was enclosed.

1812 – Kingswood House was built by William Vizard.

=== Victorian Dulwich ===
1851 – Dulwich's population reached 1,632.

1862 – West Dulwich railway station was opened as Knights Hill Station.

1868 – The Old village green was bought for public use.

1870 – Dulwich College moved to a new campus on College Road designed by Charles Barry Junior.

1888 – All Saints Church was built between 1888 and 1897; it was designed by G H Fellowes Prynne.

1890 – Dulwich Park was opened.

=== Modern Dulwich ===
1900 – Dulwich became part of the Metropolitan Borough of Camberwell.

1901 – Dulwich's Population reached 10,247.

1940s – World War II: The Blitz and the V1 flying bombs & V-2 rockets caused widespread damage to Dulwich.

1965 – Dulwich became part of the new London Borough of Southwark and London Borough of Lambeth.

== Notable residents ==
- Liv Boeree, professional poker player
- Peter Cushing
- John Lawson Johnston, also known as 'Mr Bovril'
- Ernest Shackleton
- Gerry Wells, who founded the British Vintage Wireless and Television Museum to host his collection of over 1,300 vintage radio and television sets
- P G Wodehouse attended the College

== Nearest places ==
- Dulwich Village
- Gipsy Hill
- Herne Hill
- Sydenham Hill
- Tulse Hill
- West Norwood
