= Howlettes Mead =

House in Dulwich Village, London, England

Coordinates: 51.4426°N 0.0849°W

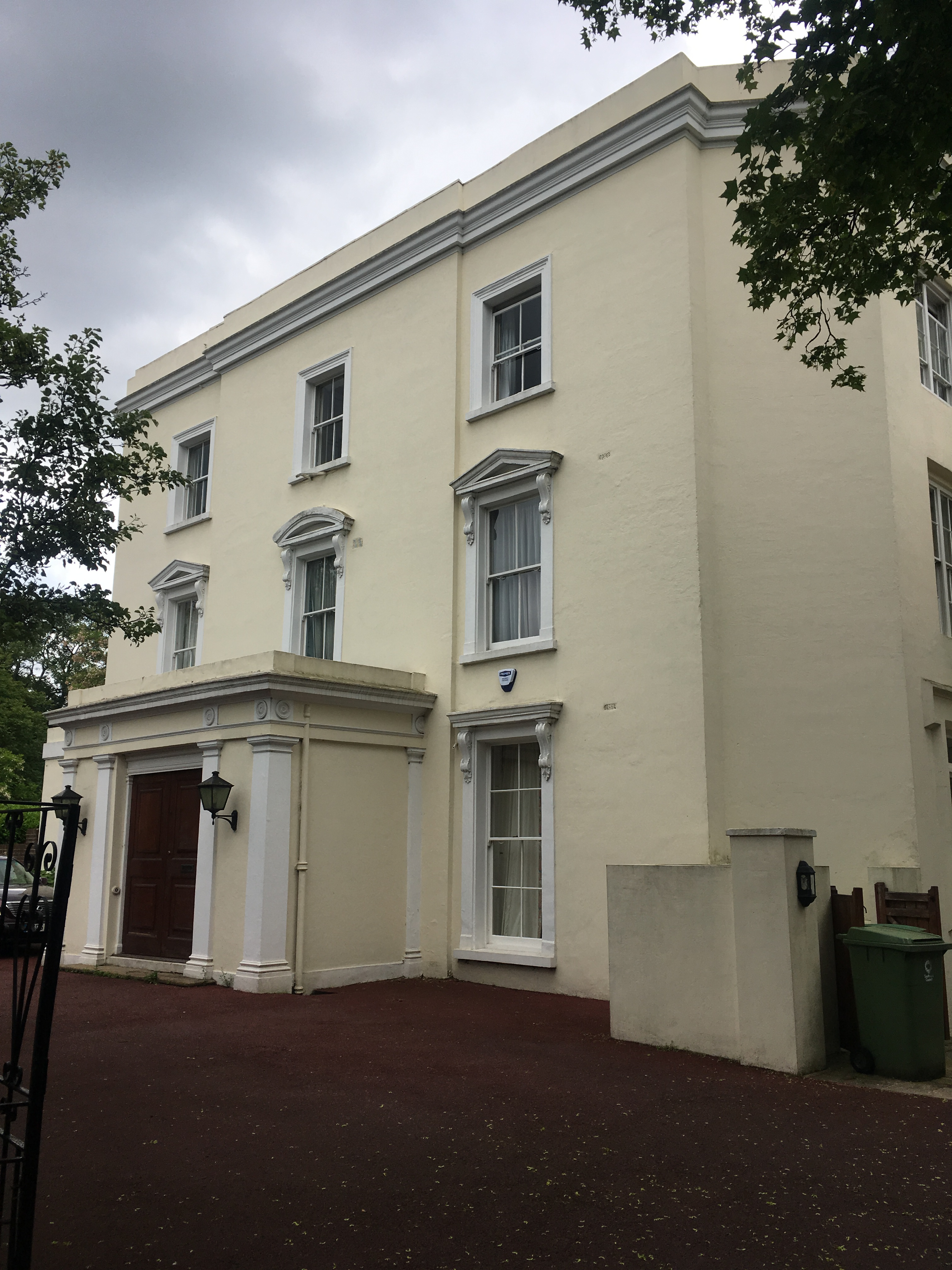
Howlettes Mead in June 2018

Howlettes Mead is a Grade II listed detached house at 48 College Road in Dulwich Village, in the London Borough of Southwark, SE21. The house is set in 2 acres of grounds. It was built in 1777 and altered in the early 19th-century. The house has 3 storeys with 2 main bays and a porch with Doric pilasters
