= Roger Pope & Partners =

London optician

Roger Pope & Partners is a London optician with a Royal Warrant from Queen Elizabeth II.

== History ==
Roger Pope opened his own practice on New Cavendish Street in 1987, after working as an optician on nearby Harley Street for 20 years. He was dispensing prescriptions from the leading Harley Street Ophthalmologists. He was joined in partnership in 1997 by Stephen Hopkinson, and in 1996 opened a second store in Dulwich Village.

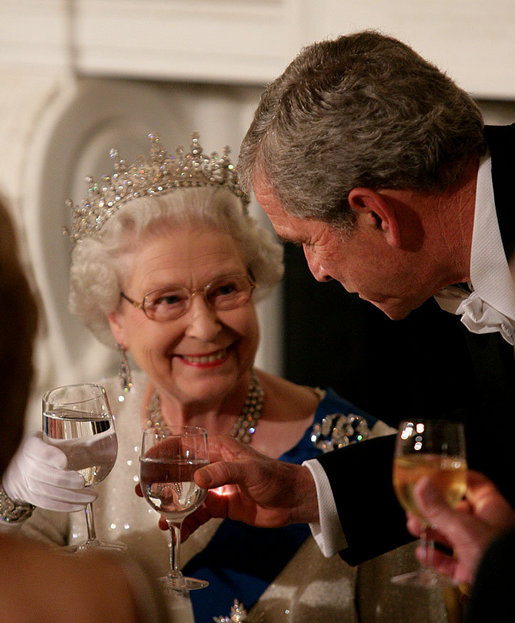
Queen Elizabeth II wearing glasses from Roger Pope

In 2006, after they had supplied her with eyewear for 5 years, Queen Elizabeth II granted a Royal Warrant to Roger Pope & Partners as her opticians.
