= Dulwich Common =

Dulwich Common may refer to:

- A historic flood plain now called West Dulwich
- Part of the A205 South Circular road in Dulwich and the London Borough of Southwark.
