= Belair Park =

Park in West Dulwich, London, England

Coordinates: 51.443°N 0.090°W

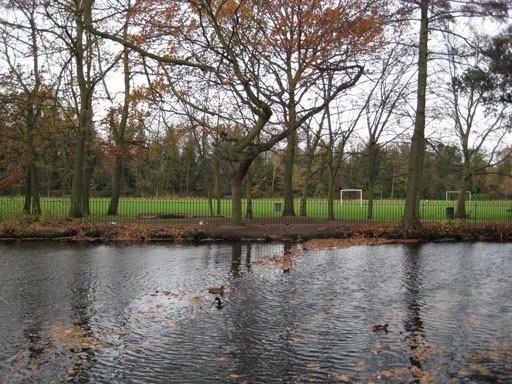
The park's lake is the only substantial stretch of the ancient River Effra remaining above ground

Belair Park is a park located in the West Dulwich part of the London Borough of Southwark, southeast London, England. The park grounds once belonged to Belair House, a country villa built in Adam style that is now a Grade II listed building. There are also two other Grade II listed structures within the park: the lodge and entrance gate, and an old stable building.

== Park grounds ==
The park, which is 10.6 hectares (26 acres) in area, is bordered by the South Circular Road and Gallery Road. It has recently been refurbished with upgraded tennis courts and the addition of a skate board facility. The London Borough of Southwark has plans to make the park more widely accessible.

The circuit around the park using its paved paths is approximately 750 m (2,460 ft).

The lake is the only substantial stretch of the ancient River Effra remaining above ground. The Herne Hill and Dulwich Flood Alleviation Scheme maximises surface water storage in the park for severe storm events.

== History ==
=== 1785–1818 ===
The estate consisted of two farms until it was leased to John Willes in 1785. Willes, a maize farmer of Whitechapel, erected a house, possibly with help from Robert Adam, but more likely from Henry Holland. This house was named College Place and the lake, as mentioned by Willes when he first leased the land from Dulwich College, was beyond the original boundary of the estate.

=== 1818–1859 ===
After John Willes' death in 1818, solicitor Charles Ranken acquired the property and renamed the house Belair.

=== 1859–1893 ===
Charles Hutton, a wool merchant and sheriff of London and Middlesex, purchased the remainder of the lease. It would seem that the majority of structural changes occurred during his ownership. North and south wings, together with conservatories and numerous outbuildings were constructed. Eventually, Belair grew to 47 rooms. Hutton lived there with his wife, their eleven children, and ten live-in servants. However, the house fell into disrepair when Hutton's Berlin wool business started to lose money.

=== 1893–1938 ===
Sir Evan Spicer of Spicer's paper merchants, was granted a lease. In his time, the property had a farm with cows, pigs, chickens, ducks and horses. In the coach house by the Gallery Road entrance, there was a coach and horses to take Sir Evan and his family across Dulwich Park to Emmanuel Church in Barry Road on Sundays. The original pump outside the coach house, which was used to water the horses, is still there. Sir Evan Spicer was the last private owner of the Belair Estate.

=== 1938–1946 ===
Belair was sold by auction after Spicer's death. With the onset of World War II, it again fell into a state of ruin. It was used first as a store, then as premises for the military.

=== 1946–1980 ===
Southwark Council subsequently purchased the lease. The main building had to be rebuilt from ground level, retaining only the original staircase. Completed in 1964, the house was restored as Willes had built it, without the extra wings and conservatories.

=== 1980–1995 ===
Under council ownership, Belair served a similar purpose to that of a village hall. The facilities were variously used for ballet lessons or as changing rooms. The only maintenance during this time was the painting of the exterior.

=== 1996–2002 ===
Gary Cady took over the running of Belair House and oversaw a complete refurbishment of the entire building, turning it into a restaurant and bar.

=== 2002–2004 ===
Sam Hajaj took over Belair House for two years until November 2004. No major work was carried out in this period.

=== 2004–2013 ===
Ibi Issolah became proprietor and took over Belair House, renaming it Beauberry House. Major refurbishment was undertaken, creating two new open-air diners, an outside bar terrace with a 2 am licence (Thursday, Friday, Saturday) and a terrace diner. The first floor was made into a private dining room and bar. The establishment then reopened on St Valentine's Day, 2006.

=== 2013–present ===
Alan Dugard and local resident Arron Curtis took the reins at Beauberry House, returning its name to Belair House. With extensive interior refurbishing, the house was restored to its Georgian heritage. Belair House now features a warm cocktail bar, sumptuous dining room, craft ale house and multipurpose event space. The official opening took place during the festive season of 2013.

== See also ==
- Old College Lawn Tennis and Croquet Club
