= Dulwich Wood =

Natural area in London

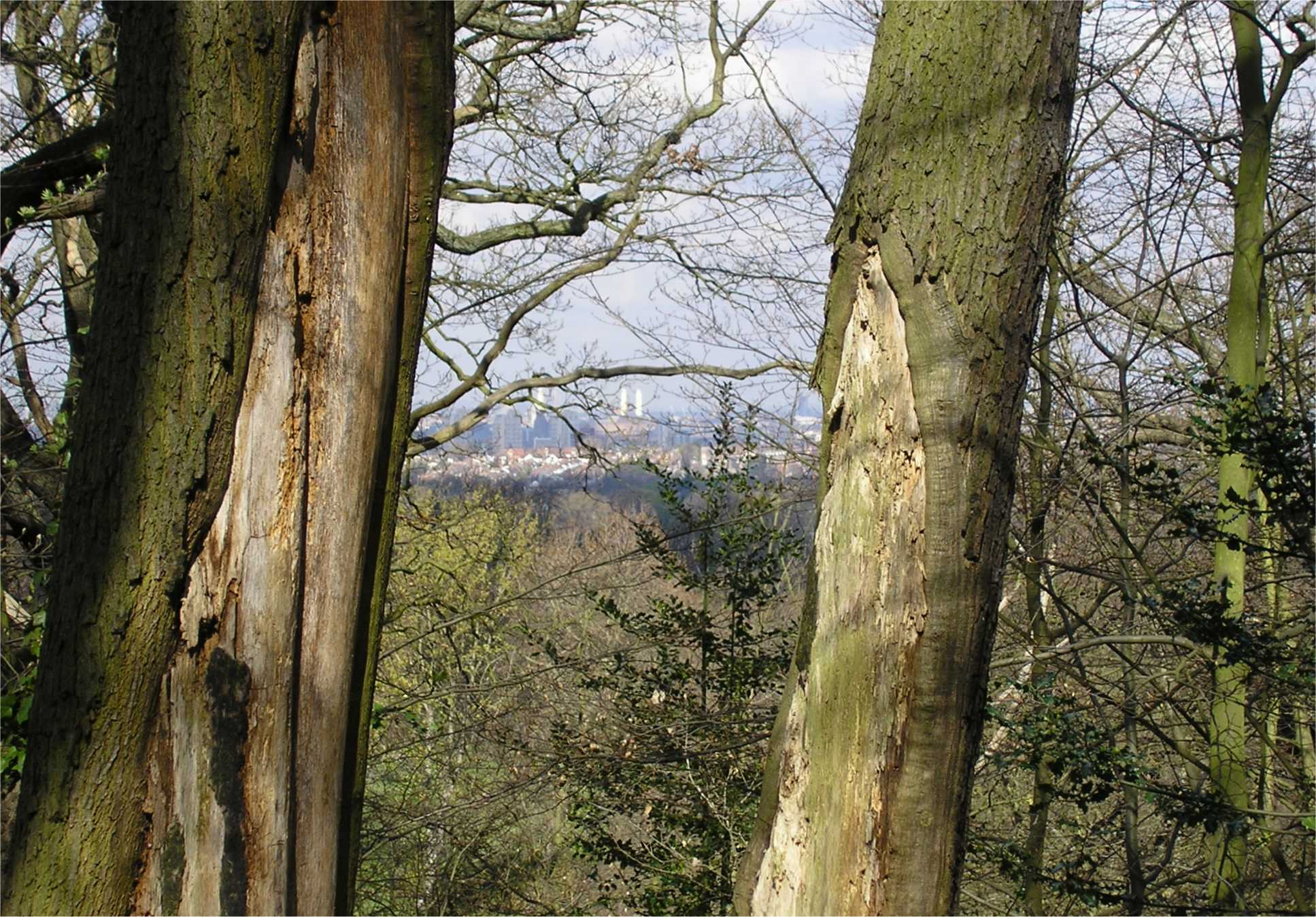
- A view from Dulwich Wood in the early spring, with Battersea Power Station in the distance.
- Interactive map of Dulwich Wood
- Type: Woodland
- Location: Dulwich
- Coordinates: 51.435149°N 0.074028°W
- Operator: Dulwich Estate
- Public transit: Sydenham Hill railway station

Dulwich Wood, together with the adjacent Sydenham Hill Wood, is the largest extant part of the ancient Great North Wood in the London Borough of Southwark. The two woods were separated after the relocation of The Crystal Palace in 1854 and the creation of the high level line in 1865. The wood is privately owned and managed by the Dulwich Estate.

== History ==
In the Middle Ages the Manor of Dulwich belonged to Bermondsey Abbey, having been given to the abbey in 1127 by King Henry I. When Henry VIII dissolved the monasteries in 1542 he had the Dulwich Estate surveyed.

The court of King Charles I paid frequent visits to Dulwich and its woods to hunt deer.

By 1605 Edward Alleyn was a wealthy man and for £5,000 (a large amount in those days), was able to buy the Manor of Dulwich from the Calton family, who had owned it since the dissolution of the monasteries. Alleyn managed the woods in a business-like way, dividing them into ten coppices, one coppice to be felled each year when the trees were ten years old. Peckarman's Wood, now a housing estate, was one of these coppices.

In 1738 a man named Samuel Bentyman was murdered in Dulwich Wood. In 1803 Samuel Matthews, known as the Dulwich Hermit, met with a similar fate. The grave of Samuel Matthews is in Dulwich Old Cemetery in the heart of Dulwich Village.

== Access ==
The wood can be reached from Sydenham Hill railway station. From the station go straight, through the small car park, cross College Road and through the white gate on the opposite side of the road into Low Cross Wood Lane and on the left just ahead is a gate to Dulwich Wood. There is also an entrance by the footbridge on Cox's Walk, off the Dulwich Common road.
