= Old College Lawn Tennis and Croquet Club =

Sports venue in Southwark, London, England

Coordinates: 51.4443°N 0.0871°W

- Abbreviation: OCLT&CC
- Formation: 1884
- Type: Sports club
- Headquarters: 10 Gallery Road, West Dulwich, London, SE21 7AB
- Region served: Southwark, London
- Affiliations: Lawn Tennis Association (LTA)
- Website: oldcollege.co.uk
- Remarks: Historically associated with Dulwich College.

The Old College Lawn Tennis and Croquet Club is in West Dulwich, Southwark, southeast London, England, to the east off Gallery Road. The "Old College" name was adopted due to its longstanding close association with Dulwich College, its president often being the college Master.

The club has eight tennis courts. In 2009, three of the courts were resurfaced with cushioned porous acrylic. The remaining courts have all-weather macadam surfaces. In 2010, an online booking system was introduced.

Close by are Dulwich Park, and, to the west, Belair Park.
