= Gerry Wells =

British radio enthusiast and collector

Gerald 'Gerry' Lloyd Wells (18 September 1929—22 December 2014) was a British radio enthusiast and collector. He turned his childhood home in West Dulwich, South London, into the British Vintage Wireless and Television Museum to host his collection of over 1,300 vintage radio and television sets. Wells' collection covers radios from 1890 onwards.

At school, Wells faced bullying and eventually became a truant, spending his time scavenging for electrical supplies and stealing radios. He was sent at 15 to an approved school in Lancashire; after he put his electrical skills to productive ends, he was judged to no longer likely to misbehave and was released. After World War II, he started a radio and television repair business and also designed and built a number of his own televisions. His business did not last and closed in 1974. Following this, he decided to turn his house into a museum, and set up a registered charity.

In 2010, Wells and his radio collection was the subject of a BBC World Service radio documentary entitled 'The Wireless World of Gerry Wells'.

Wells has published an autobiography Obsession - A Life in Wireless and is the subject of a biographical DVD Valveman - The story of one man's lifetime of obsession.
