= Gerald Wells (Royal Navy officer) =

- Born: Gerald Aylmer Wells
- Died: 1943
- Military career
- Allegiance: United Kingdom
- Branch: Royal Navy
- Service years: ?–1930
- Rank: Vice admiral
- Commands: HMS Royal Sovereign
- Conflicts: World War I

Gerald Aylmer Wells (1879 – 1943) was a Royal Navy officer who served as the Director General of the Egyptian Ports and Lighthouses Administration after his retirement in 1930.

He commanded the battleship Royal Sovereign in 1927–1929.

His father was Admiral Richard Wells.

== Bibliography ==
- Halpern, Paul G., ed. (2016). The Mediterranean Fleet, 1930–1939. Publications of the Navy Records Society. Vol. 163. London: Routledge for the Navy Records Society. ISBN 978-1-4724-7597-8.
