= Kingsdale Foundation School =

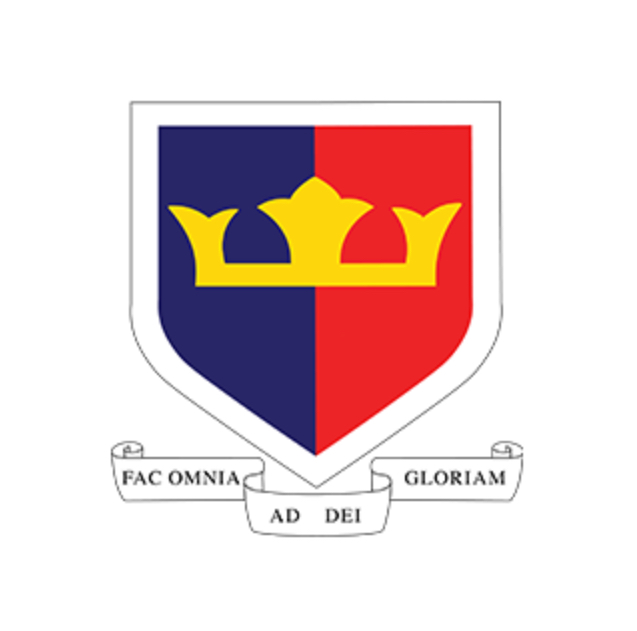

Location
- West Dulwich; Southwark, London, SE21 8SQ; England; 51°25′56″N 0°05′05″W

Information
- Type: Academy
- Motto: Fac Omnia Ad Dei Gloriam (Do Everything for the Glory of God)
- Established: 1958 - (Converted to Academy status in 2011)
- Local authority: London Borough of Southwark
- Department for Education URN: 136309 Tables
- Ofsted: Reports
- Chair of Governing Body: The Hon. Alderman of Southwark, Mrs N Gibbes
- Head Teacher: Steve Morrison
- Staff: c.300
- Gender: Mixed
- Age: 11 to 19
- Enrolment: c.2500
- Houses: Swift, Dove, Eagle, Albatross, and Falcon
- Colours: Royal Blue , red and black
- Website: http://www.kingsdalefoundationschool.org.uk/

Kingsdale Foundation School (KFS) is a British mixed secondary school with academy status in West Dulwich, London, with an age range of 11–18 (Year 7 to sixth form). Admissions to the school are coordinated by the Southwark London Borough Council as part of the Pan London Admissions Arrangements. However, many students live in surrounding boroughs, such as Lambeth, Lewisham and Croydon as the school has no catchment area.

The school was built by the London County Council and opened in 1958. It was originally built to accommodate close to 2,000 pupils. From the 1970s it developed a reputation for poor performance and examination results and in 1998 it was put under special measures.

In an attempt to bring the school up to date, a new management team was put in place and the school formed a partnership with School Works, an initiative that uses better management and design to improve the attitude and results of failing schools. A £30 million package resulted in a state-of-the-art building utilising the existing structures and an improved environment for the pupils In August 2013, the school was identified as one of the most popular state secondary schools in the country.

The school has designated specialisms in Mathematics, Physical Education and the Performing & Expressive Arts and offers scholarships for students who demonstrate an aptitude in these areas. Scholarships for Music and Physical Education are assessed on entry to Year 7, while Art and Mathematics scholarships are assessed once a student has secured a place at the school. Scholarships are worth approximately £1,000 per annum in additional support and resources.

In July 2017, the school was judged by Ofsted, to be Outstanding in all categories of inspection, including in the Sixth Form. The school was inspected in 2023 and received the same judgement.

== School Ofsted Reports ==
In July 2017, Kingsdale was judged to be an Outstanding school following the Section 5 Inspection undertaken by 9 inspectors, including 4 of His Majesty's Inspectors (HMIs).

The summary of the findings from the July 2017 Inspection Report were:

Overall effectiveness Outstanding -Effectiveness of leadership and management Outstanding -Quality of teaching, learning and assessment Outstanding -Personal development, behaviour and welfare Outstanding -Outcomes for pupils Outstanding -16 to 19 study programmes Outstanding

In December 2012, at the previous inspection, the school had been judged to be Good.

== Achievement of pupils ==
In previous years Kingsdale had risen from its previous poor performances and has been recognised as one of the most improved schools in London. In 2010 58% students achieved the key national benchmark of 5 or more A* – C grades at GCSE. The GCSE pass rate including Mathematics and English, in 2011 this went up to over 60%. Government figures for the new English Baccalaureate created in 2010 has the school at 4% pass rate against a national average of 15%. In 2011, all students, nearly 250, left with one recognised qualification resulting in a 100% pupil pass rate.

In 2012, as reported by Ofsted in the December 2012 report, Year 11 attainment experienced a 'significant dip'. In reporting on this situation, Ofsted stated that "During this inspection, all groups of students were making good progress in the large majority of lessons and outstanding progress in some lessons.". The report went on to state "..As a result, the progress made by all students, including boys, has now returned to the good levels seen in the past and attainment is rising rapidly across the school, particularly in English, mathematics and science."

In 2012, the school's GCSE results fell, particularly prior to the English GCSE resits which were offered to all schools caught up in the national English GCSE examination scandal. This equated to roughly 1 in 14 students nationally resitting the examination in October 2012. Performance Tables for 2012 achievement published in January 2013, do not reflect the attainment of students who achieved a Grade C or above in these English GCSE resits (36% of Kingsdale pupils achieved 5A*-C GCSE grades with English and Mathematics). The school results published on their website are therefore considerably higher than this figure as they reflect the addition of resit grades (currently published at 5A*-C GCSE grades with English and Mathematics at 49%). The national average for secondary schools in England and Wales is 59% of pupils achieving 5 A*-C grades including English and Maths.

In 2020, Kingsdale performed exceptionally well in GCSE results, despite the ever-looming pandemic: over 10 students achieved at least 9 Grade 9s and over 100 students achieved 4 or more Grades 8 & 9. Moreover, examination outcomes indicate that almost 90% of students achieved a good or better pass in both English and Mathematics and nearly 50% of the cohort achieved a strong pass in the English Baccalaureate.

== Building refurbishment project ==
Architect Philip Marsh during the 2003 refurbishment.

The modernist building was designed by the London County Council Architect's Department, under the leadership of Leslie Martin. In 'austerity Britain', Martin's team had to scrimp on materials creating 'honeycombed' plaster walls and minimal screed between floors. Still the design observed the best principles of modernism, with concrete stairs positioned at each corner of the oblong building, boxed in glass and steel frames. The shoe-box shape described a 'quadrangle' that served as an inner playground as well as letting natural light into the corridors. William Turnbull's sculpture 'Sungazer', popularly known as 'the Fish' stood in the quad.

In the early 2000s (decade), the architects De Rijke Marsh and Morgan (drMM) and builders Galliford Try refurbished the building, adding a translucent and sun-sensitive 'skin' over the quadrangle, adding additional corridors, and constructing a wooden-framed, egg-shaped 'pod' that projected into the quad, containing a music hall. The re-build was controversial after the administrator Hilary Cottam was awarded the Designer of the Year award 2005.

Recognition has included:

- 2009 Highly Commended - British Council for School Environments Industry Awards 'Inspiring Design'
- 2008 Highly Commended - World Architecture Festival Awards 'Learning' Category
- 2005 Winner - Royal Fine Art Commission 'Building of the Year Award'
- 2004 Winner - The Wood Awards (for the Auditorium)
- 2004 Winner M4I - Demonstration Award (for the consultation process)

The building refurbishment programme was featured on Channel 4's Secret Life of Buildings presented by Tom Dyckhoff in August 2011 where the positive effect of the building and the spaces created on the students was discussed.

== Kingsdale Foundation School Sixth Form ==
The school re-opened its sixth form in September 2010 and offers courses at Level 2 and Level 3. These include Advanced Levels in Art, Biology, Chemistry, Physics, History, Mathematics, Music, French, German, Spanish, Latin, Economics, Psychology, English Literature and Philosophy, Post-16 Scholarships are made available for students in Mathematics and the Creative and Performing Arts. Sixth Form students have access to a refurbished study centre, a music recording studio, Auditorium and HD projector-equipped classrooms.

== Admissions ==
In 2018, the school received over 3050 applications for 410 places which makes it the most popular school in the Borough of Southwark. The school offers Music and Sports Scholarships which assess student aptitude in these areas. Students who apply for these scholarships must complete a Supplementary Form in addition to their borough CAF.

It has recently been named by MyLondon as the hardest school to receive a place in London; whilst also in the top 10 most oversubscribed schools in the UK.

== Historical examination allegations ==
In October 2012, it was confirmed that following an investigation by Ofqual, the integrity of the examination grades awarded at the school in 2011 were not compromised and "...were a true reflection of students' attainment.". This was announced in a statement from the Joint Council for Qualifications (JCQ) whose spokesperson stated "On the basis of the information received and the preliminary investigation undertaken, the conclusion was reached that the integrity of the grades given was not undermined.".

== Notable alumni ==
- Ms Banks - British rapper, singer and songwriter
- Ife Ogunjobi - British musician and member of Ezra Collective
- Alex Yee - Professional triathlete and double Olympic medallist
- Sherif Lanre - Contestant on Love Island 2019
- John Coghlan - drummer in Status Quo
- James Heartfield - writer and journalist
- Andy McNab - novelist and former SAS operative and soldier
- Caron Wheeler - singer, most famous for association with Soul II Soul
- Lino Facioli - actor, played Robin Arryn in Game of Thrones
- Catherine Lyons - Gymnast, European Junior Championship silver medalist
- Lola Young - singer-songwriter (transferred to the BRIT school at 15)
