= Harris Boys' Academy East Dulwich =

Location
- Peckham Rye; Peckham, London, SE22 0AT; England; 51.45602°N 0.06462°W

Information
- Type: Academy
- Established: September 2009
- Trust: Harris Federation
- Department for Education URN: 135816 Tables
- Ofsted: Reports
- Head of Academy (Principal): Carla Price
- Gender: Boys
- Age: 11 to 18
- Enrolment: 825 As of September 2020
- Capacity: 950
- Website: www.harrisdulwichboys.org.uk

Harris Boys' Academy East Dulwich (HBAED) is a secondary school and sixth form with academy status for boys, located in the Peckham area of the London Borough of Southwark, England. Students arrive from 55 different feeder schools.

The school first opened in 2009 at Langbourne Primary School, before moving into new buildings in 2010. The school is sponsored by the Harris Federation, a federation of academies and free schools in England.

Harris Boys' Academy East Dulwich offers GCSEs as programmes of study for pupils, while students in the sixth form have the option to study a range of A Levels. The school has close links with Harris Girls' Academy East Dulwich and the two schools operate some of their sixth form courses in consortium.

The school was ranked 'outstanding' in all areas by Ofsted in 2023, after the exemption for outstanding schools from routine inspection was lifted.

== Academics ==
In designing the curriculum, the senior management consulted students, teachers, subject leaders, senior staff, governors and latest academic research. All the time the constraints of the National Curriculum, set by the Secretary of State for Education had to be observed. Virtually all maintained schools and academies follow the National Curriculum, and are inspected by Ofsted on how well they succeed in delivering a 'broad and balanced curriculum'. Schools endeavour to get all students to achieve the English Baccalaureate (EBACC) qualification- this must include core subjects a modern or ancient foreign language, and either History or Geography. The academy operates a three-year, Key Stage 3 where all the core National Curriculum subjects are taught. The aim is "to give the students a chance to take examinations best suited for them to achieve tangible outcomes through summative grades. These grades are what gives a student life chances. In key Stage 3 the subject reach is broad and in Key Stage 4 the options are balanced so there is on offer appropriate to everyone." Ofsted, in the last inspection in 2011, said "There is a clear rationale for the curriculum that ensures students have a firm foundation for learning with literacy and numeracy skills that are developed well. This is allowing students to fully participate in the extensive opportunities the academy offers."

School runs from 8.15 until 3.05 (KS3) or 8.15 until 3.50 (KS4) allowing for Co-curricular activities.

Key Stage 3

All the National Curriculum subjects are taught each week and also a Performing Arts course. Religious Studies and Citizenship are taught together.

Key Stage 4

In 10 and 11, that is in Key Stage 4 students study a core of English Language, English Literature, Mathematics, Science (Trilogy or Combined), BTEC Sport, History and/or Geography Students have three options chosen from three pools, one of which contain History and Geography. Other GCSE options are Business Studies, GCSE Citizenship, GCSE Art, GCSE Computer Science, GCSE Music, CSE History, GCSE Religious Studies, GCSE Design Technology.

BTECs are BTEC Performing Arts, BTEC Digital Information Technology, BTEC Enterprise, BTEC Travel and Tourism, BTEC Performing Arts, BTEC Digital Information Technology. In 2020 90% of KS3 students complete an EBacc qualifying Curriculum, with roughly 70% continuing to study Spanish at KS4 and therefore qualifying for the measure.
