= All Saints Church, West Dulwich =

Church in London, England

All Saints' Church, West Dulwich
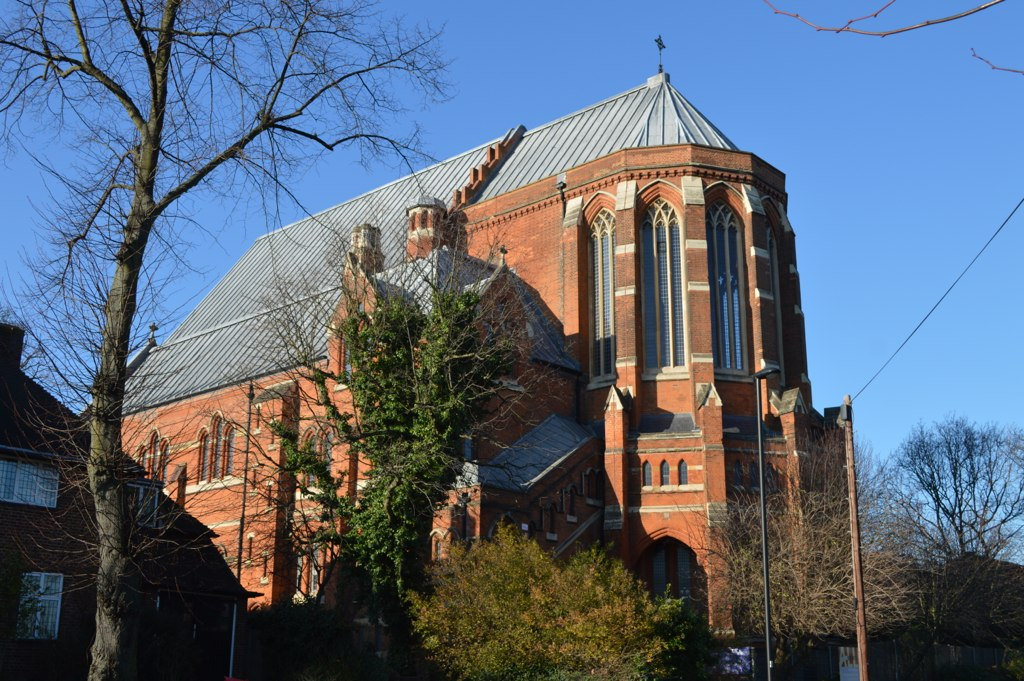
- View from the east

- 51°26′30″N 0°5′50″W
- Location: Rosendale Road, Lambeth, London SE21
- Country: England
- Denomination: Church of England
- Website: www.all-saints.org.uk

History
- Dedication: All Saints
- Consecrated: 13 November 1897
- Events: June 1944 damaged by V-1 flying bomb June 2000 gutted by fire

Architecture
- Heritage designation: Grade I
- Designated: 27 March 1981
- Architect: George Fellowes Prynne
- Style: Gothic Revival
- Years built: 1888–91

Specifications
- Materials: brick

Administration
- Province: Canterbury
- Diocese: Southwark
- Archdeaconry: Lambeth

Clergy
- Vicar: Revd Dr Alan Everett

All Saints' Church is a Church of England parish church in West Dulwich, South London. It is a red brick building designed in a Gothic Revival style by George Fellowes Prynne, and was built from 1888 to 1891. It is Grade I listed.

== Parish ==
All Saints' parish was formed from the western part of the parish of St Luke's, West Norwood, and also included a detached part of the parish of St Leonard's Church, Streatham. The area that became All Saints' parish was largely rural, until West Dulwich railway station was opened in 1863. The following decades were marked by an upsurge in residential development. In the 1880s, a temporary iron church was erected on Rosendale Road. This was replaced by a permanent structure that was consecrated on 13 November 1897.

The 1901 Census recorded the parish's population as 3,665. In the following year, it was served by one clergyman and attendance at its services (morning and evening combined) represented 37.3% of the parochial population.

Based on statistics from UK censuses, the Diocese of Southwark estimated the population of All Saints' parish was 5,700 in 2001 and 6,400 in 2011.

== Building ==
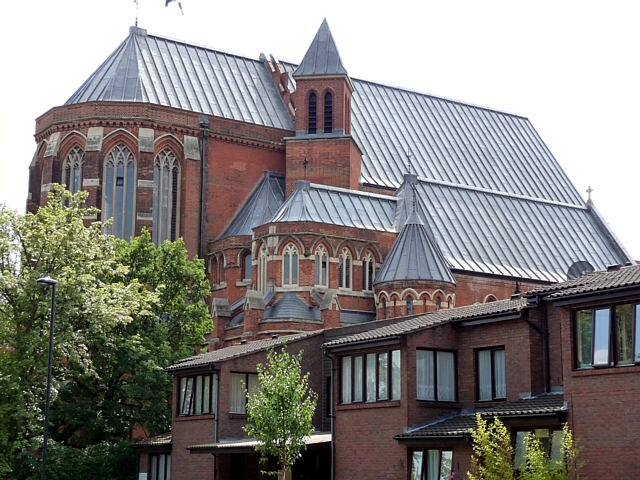
View from the north

The church was designed by George Fellowes Prynne, a pupil of George Edmund Street. It stands on a site that slopes dramatically down from Lovelace Road to Rosendale Road. The east end of the church is lofty and the whole church, with the exception of the incomplete west bay, is situated over crypt spaces, which are extensively used by the wider community. The northeast corner of the building has four storeys of accommodation. An enclosed staircase rises to church floor level across the east elevation.

The nave of the building was intended to be three bays longer, with an apsidal western baptistery. A flèche was intended over the chancel arch, flanked by a tall slender tower. Only the base of the flèche exists, and the present bell turret by JBS Comper of 1952 is a modest substitute.

The church is brick-built with stone dressings and steep-pitched slated roofs. The aisles have individual double-pitched roofs, with deep valley gutters alongside the nave's clerestory.

There is a four-bay nave. The west bay of the nave is incomplete, having only what was intended to be a temporary slated gable end and no clerestory. The nave is flanked by the Lady Chapel in the north aisle, and All Souls' Chapel in the south aisle. The apsidal chancel is enclosed by a narrow ambulatory. To the north the Lady Chapel has its own arcaded chancel with ambulatory. To the south of the chancel the space is occupied by the organ chamber and vestries.

In June 1944 a V-1 flying bomb exploded near the church, shattering the stained glass windows and damaging the roof. Services continued in the crypt until the church was restored after the war.

On 9 June 2000, the building's interior was destroyed in a fire. Restoration work was completed in April 2006, providing the western end of the church with a modern entrance that contrasts with the Gothic architecture of the remainder of the building. Though the church organ was destroyed in the fire, it was later replaced in the summer of 2011 by a 1969 organ that was previously in the chapel at St Paul's School in Barnes.

== Other uses ==
The church is the home of the Lambeth Orchestra and the Dulwich Symphony Orchestra. After the restoration, a private nursery was installed in the basement.

== Sources ==
- Pevsner, Nikolaus (1952). London. The Buildings of England. Vol. 2 Except the Cities of London and Westminster. Harmondsworth: Penguin Books. p. 270. ISBN 0-14-071006-X.
