= North Dulwich railway station =

National Rail station in London, England

North Dulwich
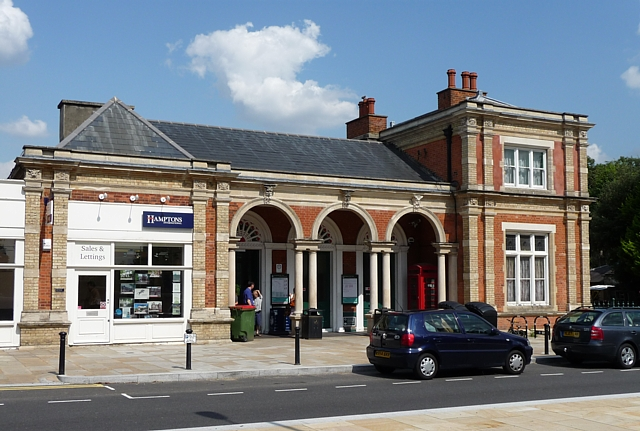
- Station entrance building designed by Charles Barry Jr.
- Interactive map of North Dulwich

General information
- Location: Dulwich
- Local authority: London Borough of Southwark
- Managed by: Southern
- Station code: NDL
- DfT category: E
- Number of platforms: 2
- Fare zone: 2 and 3

National Rail annual entry and exit
- 2020–21: ▼0.237 million
- 2021–22: ▲0.528 million
- 2022–23: ▲0.602 million
- 2023–24: ▲0.659 million
- 2024–25: ▲0.731 million

Key dates
- 1 October 1868: Opened

Other information
- External links: Departures; Facilities
- Coordinates: 51.4543°N 0.0887°W

North Dulwich railway station is in the London Borough of Southwark in Dulwich, south London. The station and all trains serving it are operated by Southern, and it is on the boundary of London fare zone 2 and 3 (tickets with either zone are valid).

The station was designed in a hybrid classical style by Charles Barry Jr. and built in 1868 by the London, Brighton and South Coast Railway. It is listed Grade II on the National Heritage List for England as is the K6 telephone kiosk inside the portico of the station.

== Services ==
All services at North Dulwich are operated by Southern using Class 377 EMUs.

The typical off-peak service in trains per hour is:

- 4 tph to London Bridge via Peckham Rye
- 2 tph to East Croydon via Norbury
- 2 tph to Beckenham Junction via Crystal Palace

Preceding station	National Rail	Following station
East Dulwich	Southern London to East Croydon Crystal Palace Line	Tulse Hill

== Potential step-free access ==
In March 2026, the local Liberal Democrats representatives said that they will investigate the possibility of adding step-free access to North Dulwich Station, should they win at the local elections on 7 May 2026.

== Connections ==
London Buses routes serve the station.

== Gallery ==
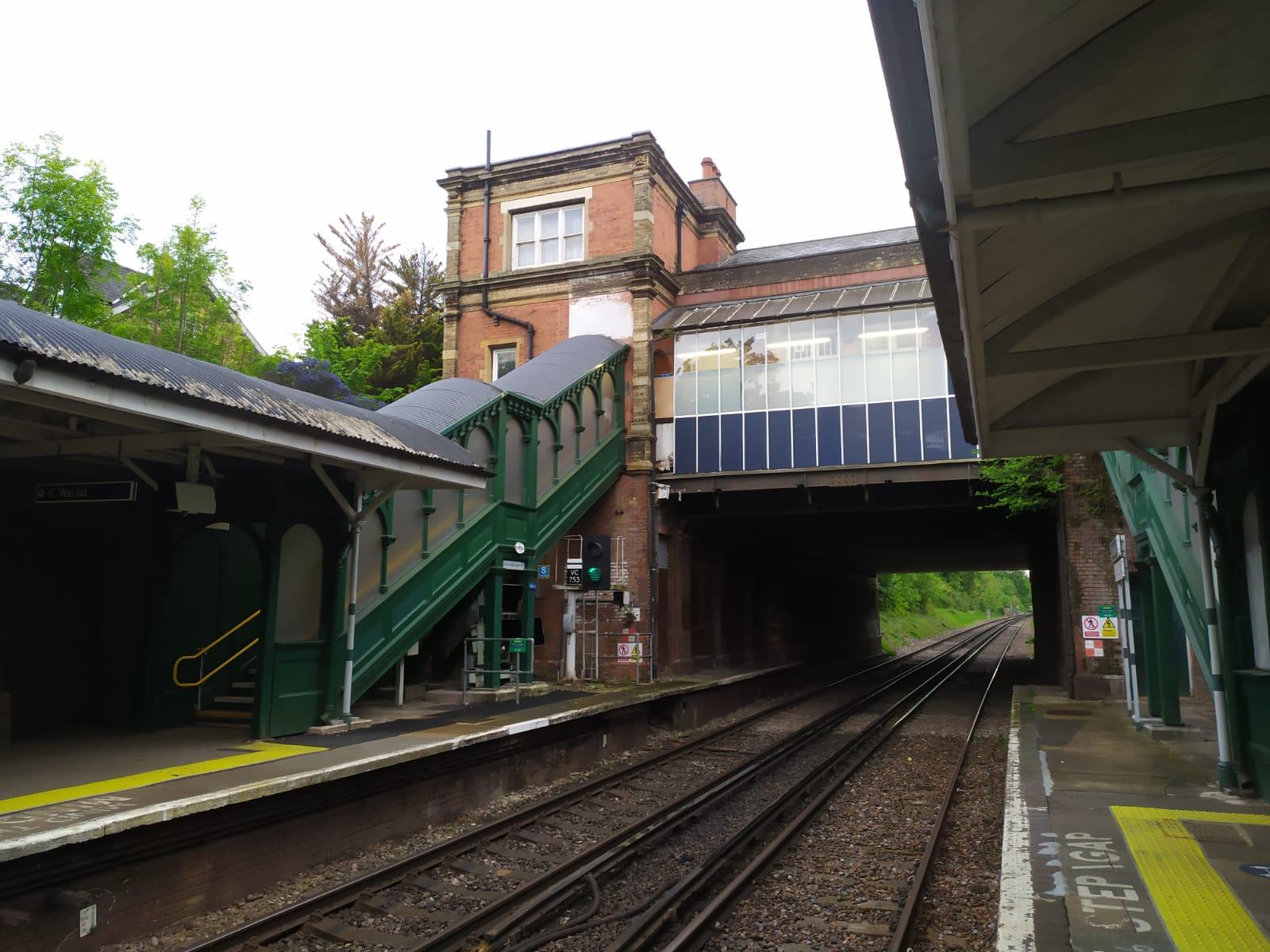
North Dulwich Station in 2021 looking South.

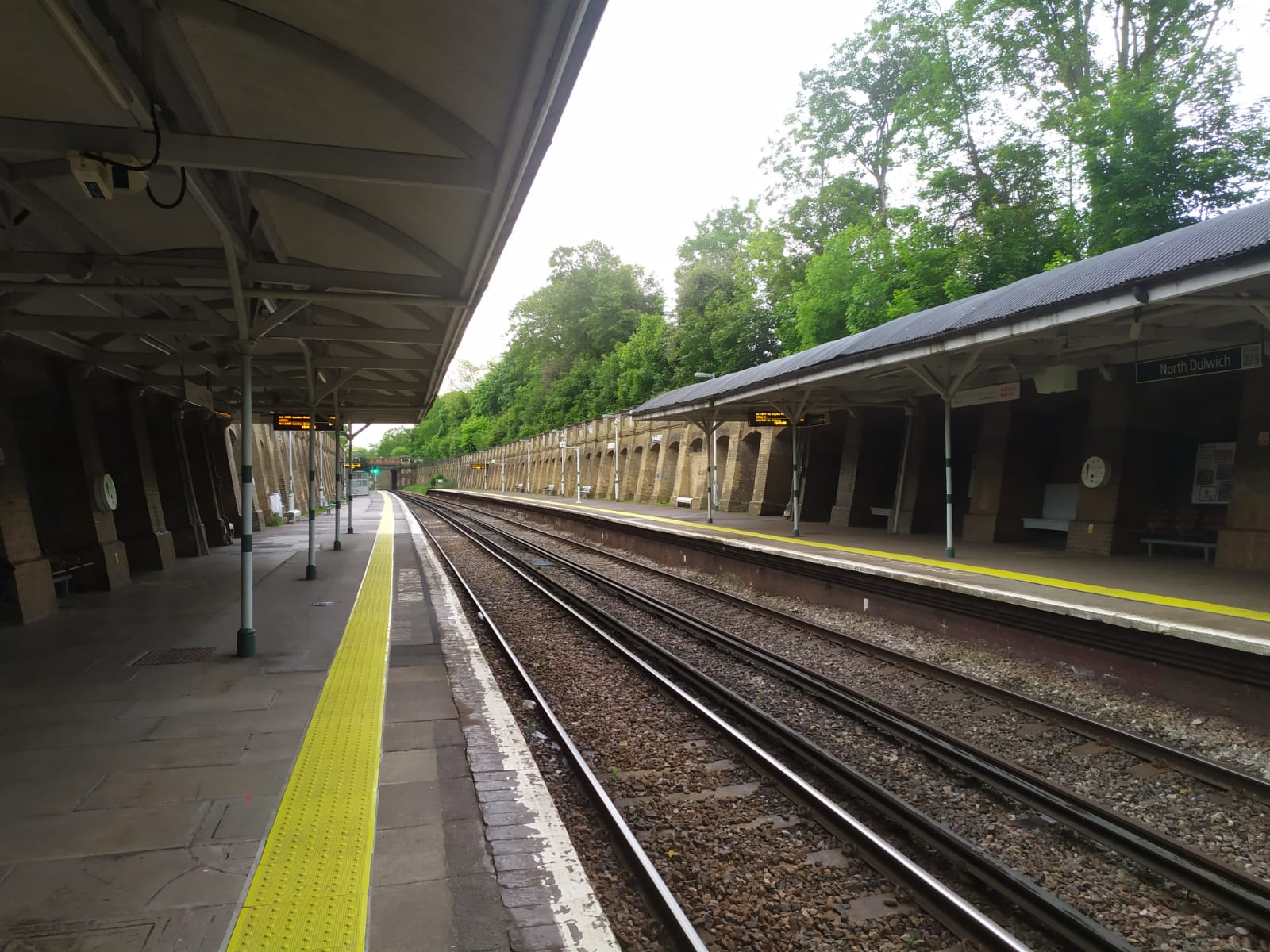
North Dulwich Station in 2021 looking North.

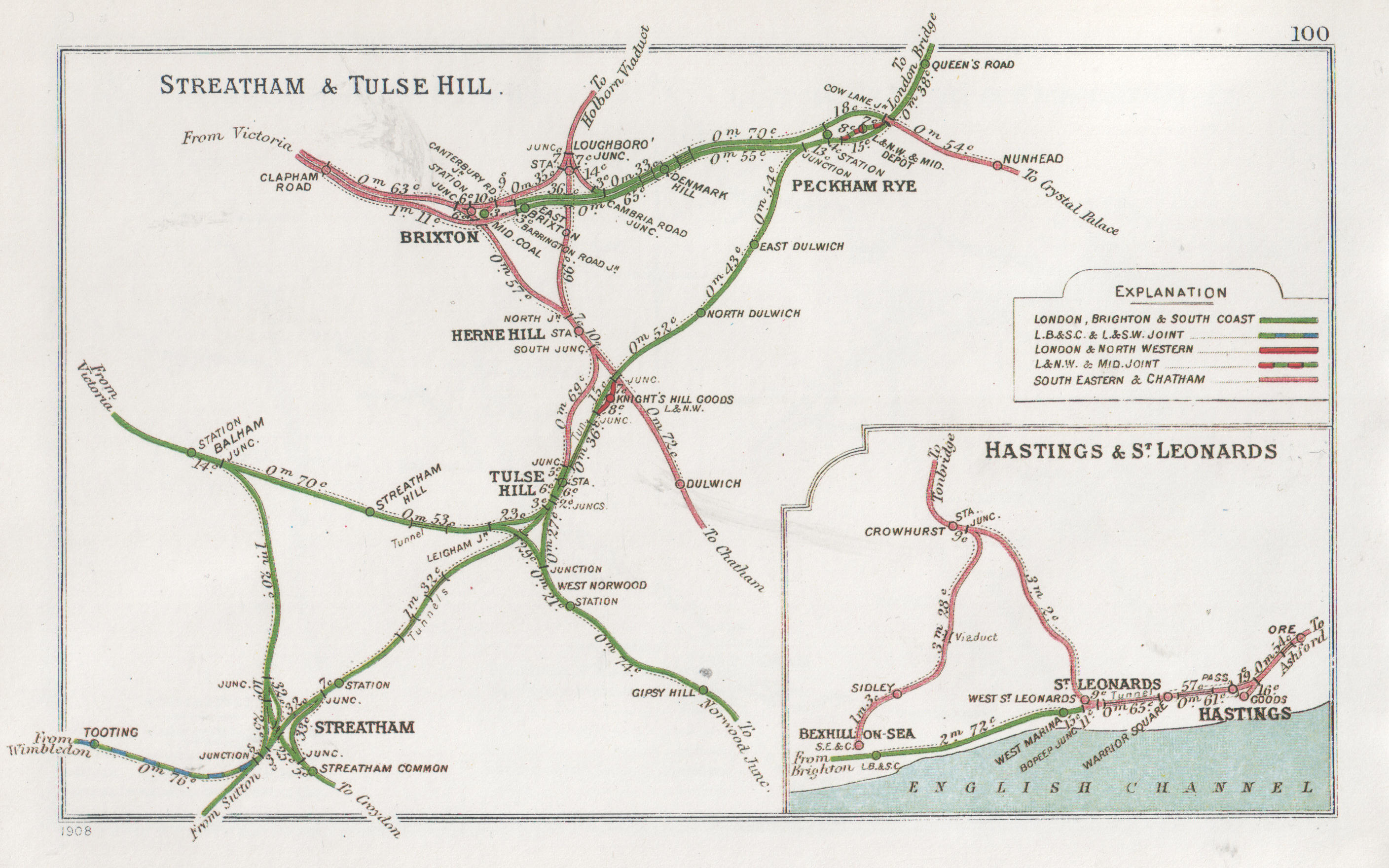
A 1908 Railway Clearing House map of lines around North Dulwich railway station.
