= Dulwich Park =

Public Park in Dulwich, London

Coordinates: 51.445853°N 0.078734°W

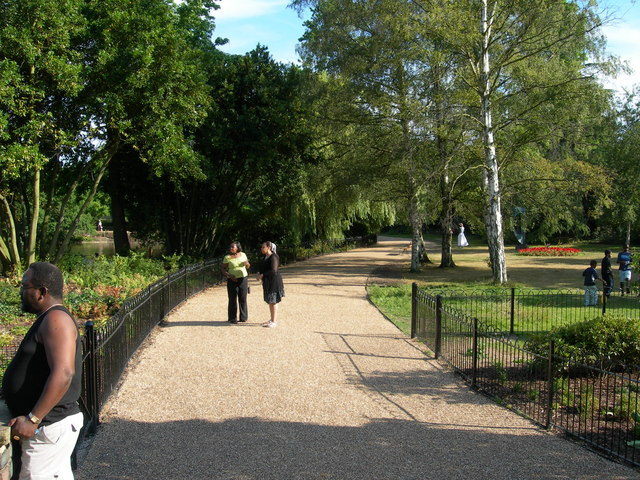
View in Dulwich Park.

Dulwich Park is a 30.85-hectare (76.2-acre) public park in Dulwich in the London Borough of Southwark, south London, England. The park was created by the Metropolitan Board of Works from former farmland and meadows. While the initial design was by Charles Barry Jr., it was later refined by Lt Col J. J. Sexby (who also designed Battersea and parts of Southwark parks). It was opened in 1890 by Lord Rosebery. From 2004 to 2006, the park was restored to its original Victorian layout, following a grant from the Heritage Lottery Fund. The park is listed Grade II on the Register of Historic Parks and Gardens.

Dulwich Park contains a café, boating lake and numerous sporting facilities. Various types of recumbent bicycles are available for hire. Cars have not been permitted to drive inside the park since 2003, with the exception of disabled badge holders, but there is a fee-paying car park at the College Road entrance.

== Architecture ==
The gates and lodges surrounding the park are listed Grade II on the National Heritage List; these include the park lodges next to the Old College and Rosebery gates, and the Queen Mary, Court Lane, Rosebery, and Old College gates and their attached railings.

On 20 December 2011, a sculpture by Barbara Hepworth, Two Forms (Divided Circle) that resides in the park, was cut from its plinth and stolen by suspected scrap metal thieves.

== Sport ==
The park is the home of Dulwich Park Runners, a local running club. A Parkrun takes place each Saturday. There is also an active bowling club that operates every summer from April until September. Bowling has operated on the green in the middle of the park since 1900.

== See also ==
- Old College Lawn Tennis and Croquet Club
