= Dulwich Village =

Area of Dulwich, London, England

Coordinates: 51.447508°N 0.085595°W

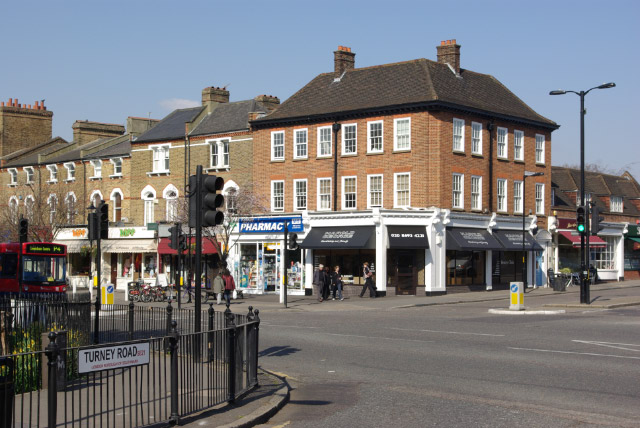

- Location within Greater London
- London borough: Southwark
- Ceremonial county: Greater London
- Region: London
- Country: England
- Sovereign state: United Kingdom
- Post town: LONDON
- Postcode district: SE21, SE22
- Dialling code: 020
- Police: Metropolitan
- Fire: London
- Ambulance: London
- UK Parliament: Dulwich and West Norwood
- London Assembly: Lambeth and Southwark

Dulwich Village is an affluent area of Dulwich in South London, England. It is located in the London Borough of Southwark.

== History ==
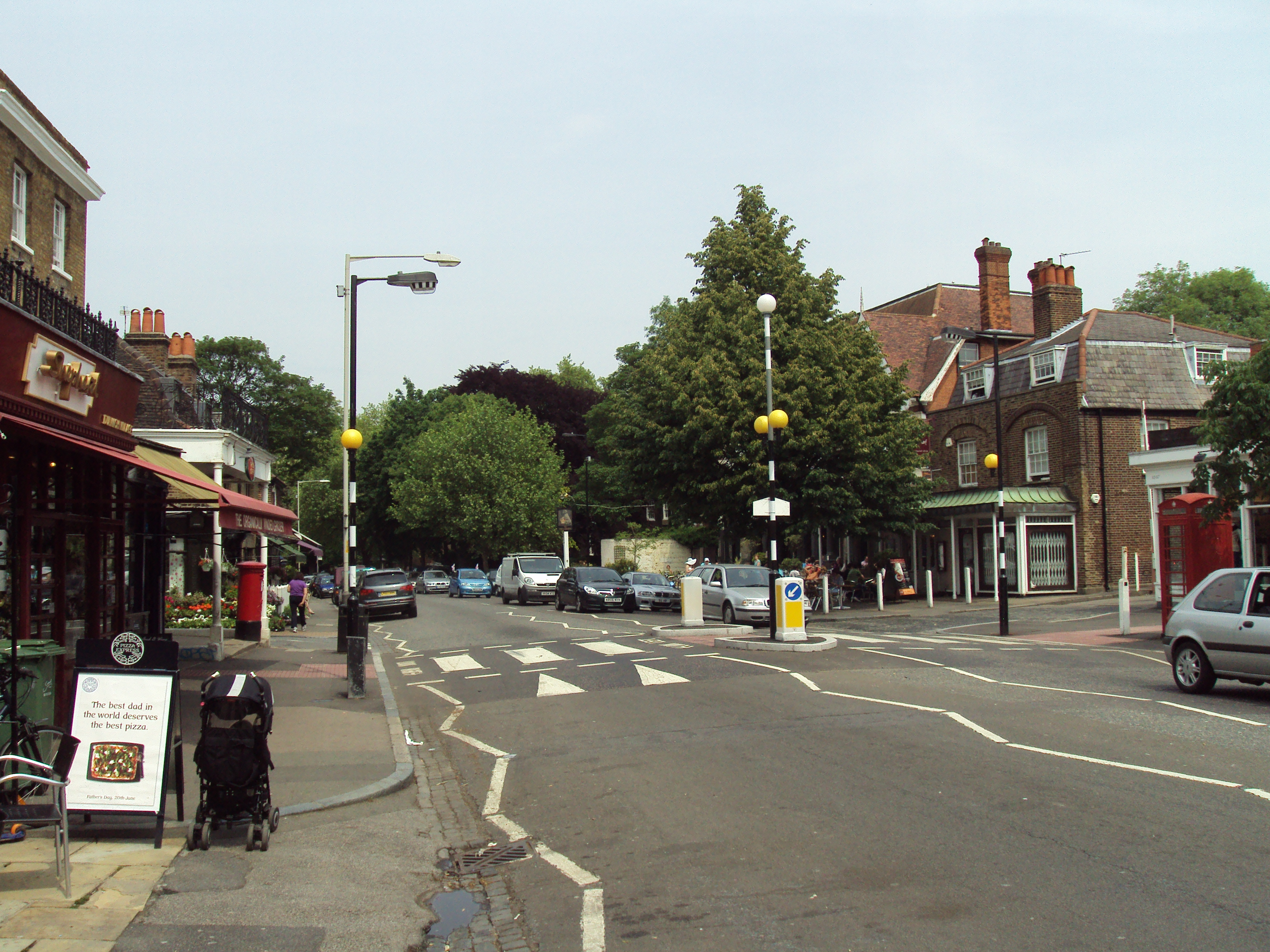
Dulwich Village

"Dulwich Village" is also the name of the village High Street. Residents in Dulwich Village have to pay ground rent to the Dulwich Estate a landowning charitable organisation. Dulwich Village is entirely within the boundaries of the London Borough of Southwark and with the exception of one address near Dulwich Picture Gallery it is completely within the Dulwich Estate.

North Dulwich station is near the northern end of Dulwich Village and the P4 bus passes through the village. To the south is Gallery Road where the Dulwich Picture Gallery is located.

Dulwich College lies on the south side of the village.

== Buildings of interest ==
- Belair House, 1785
- Dulwich Picture Gallery
- Christ's Chapel
- Bell House

== Governance ==
For election of councillors to Southwark London Borough Council, Dulwich Village formed part of the Village ward from 2002 and then the Dulwich Village ward since 2018.
