= Kingswood Estate =

Housing development in London, England

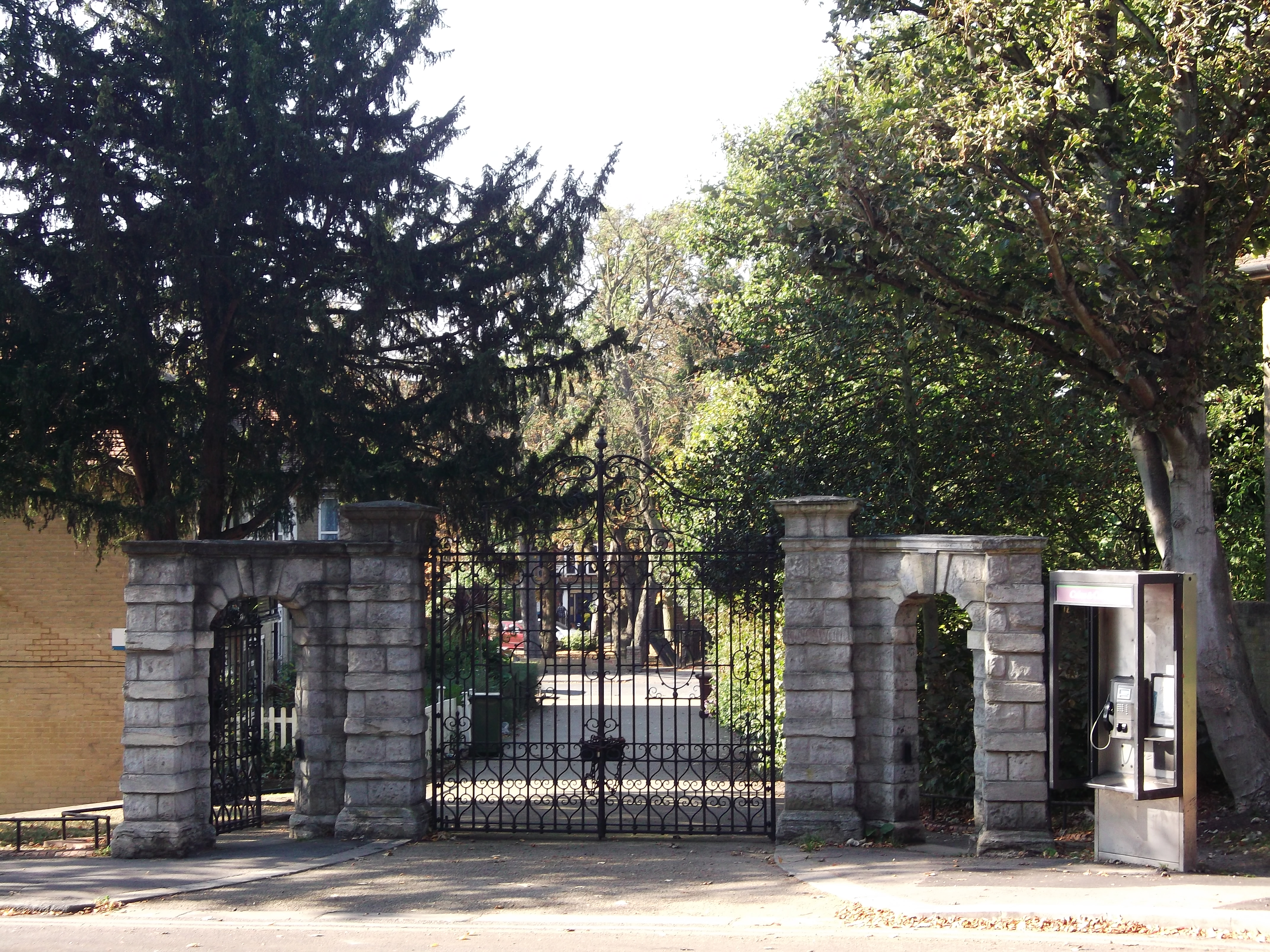
- The entrance gates to the estate

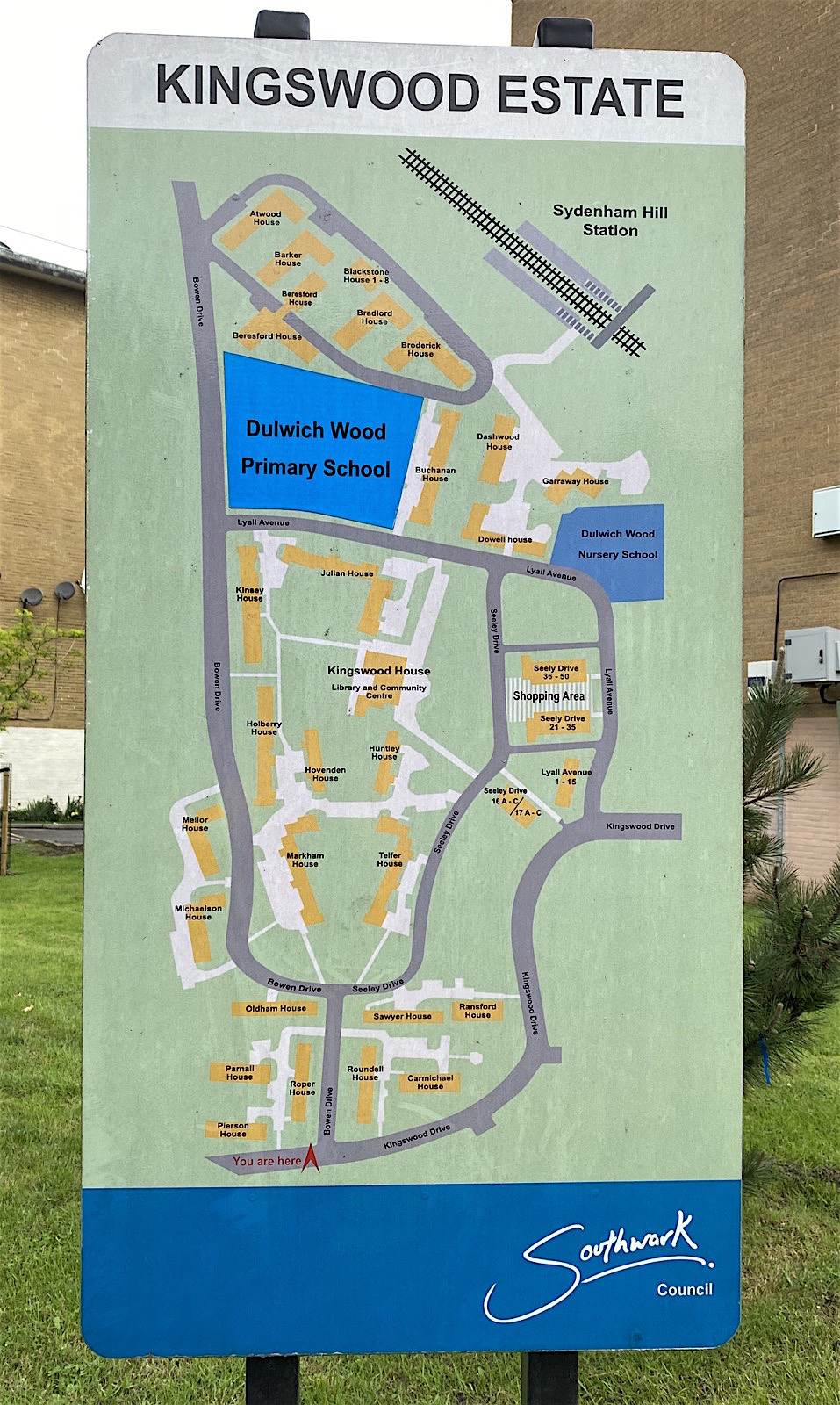
- A street sign showing a plan of the estate
- Interactive map of Kingswood Estate

General information
- Location: Sydenham Hill, West Dulwich
- Coordinates: 51°25′51″N 0°04′54″W
- Area: South London
- No. of units: 789

Construction
- Constructed: 1950s
- Authority: London County Council
- Style: Brick modernism

Refurbishment
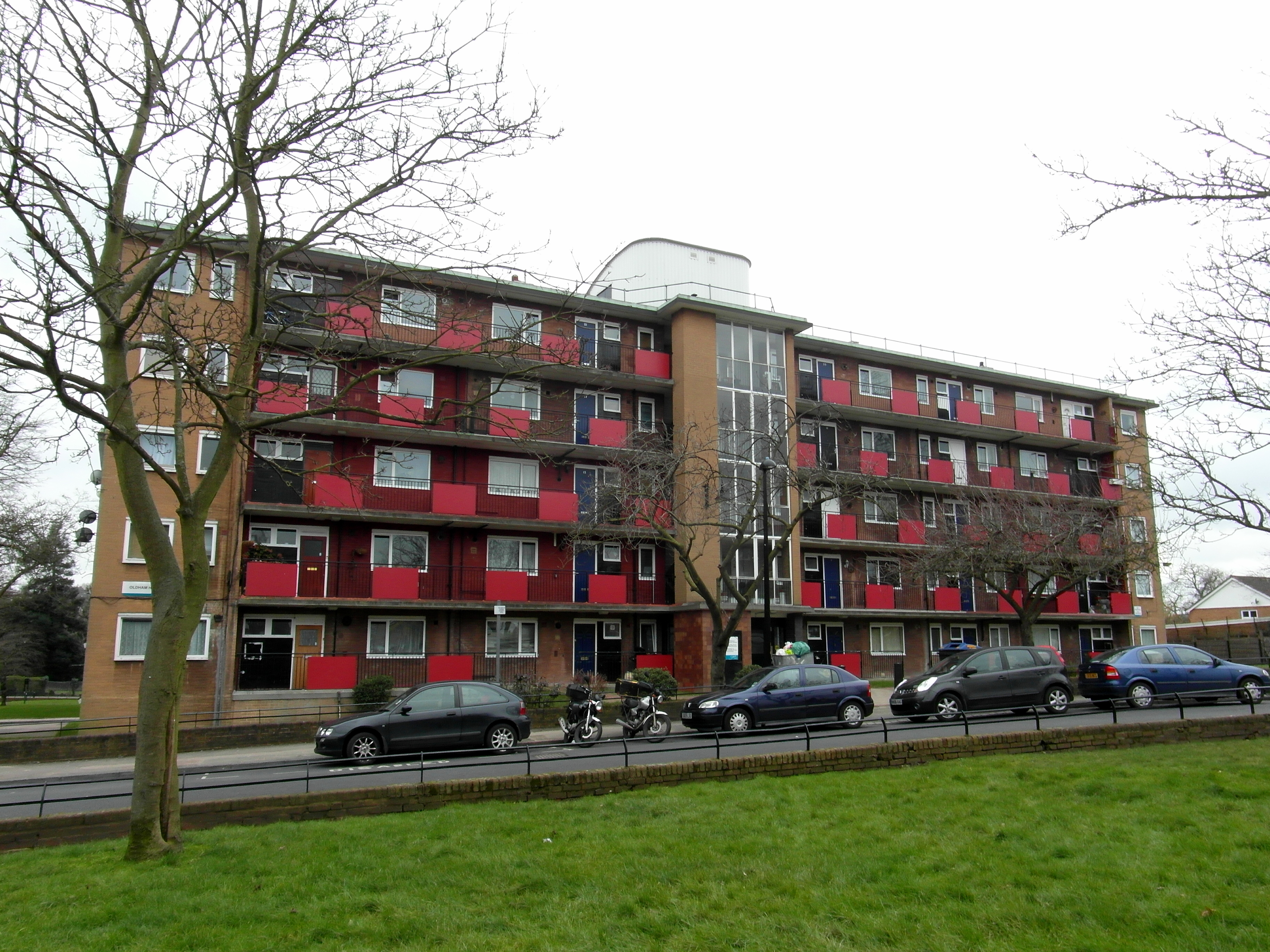
- Building on Kingswood Estate showing exterior improvements after first phase of refurbishment, 2013
- Proposed action: EWI
- Refurbished: 2024
- Architect: Blakeney Leigh
- Contractor: PJ Mear

Other information
- Governing body: Southwark Council

The Kingswood Estate is a modernist housing development located in Sydenham Hill, West Dulwich in South London. Comprising 789 homes, the estate is sited on the former grounds of Kingswood House.

== History ==
=== 19th century ===
The history of Kingswood Estate can be traced back to 1811 when a parcel of land was formed from the Manor of Dulwich and leased to the lawyer William Vizard. Over the next century a succession of wealthy owners would retain the estate as a distinct entity with John Lawson Johnston extending the residency into a grand Jacobethan mansion during the 1890s.

=== 20th century ===
Following World War II London faced an acute housing crisis, leading the London County Council (LCC) to acquire the 37-acre site in 1946. Designs produced the following year indicated the construction of 748 new homes, including 46 cottages over 30 acres of the estate.

Constructed in the 1950s the estate’s architecture is an unusually late example of brick modernism, typical of the pre-war style associated with the architect Willem Marinus Dudok. The slightly anachronistic design of the housing can be attributed to idiosyncrasies of the bureaucratic allocation of departmental responsibilities within the LCC. However, despite contemporary criticism of the design of other LCC developments, Kingswood Estate has been highly regarded, with the Dulwich Society noting that “there can be fewer public housing schemes where so much care and thought has gone into the design“.

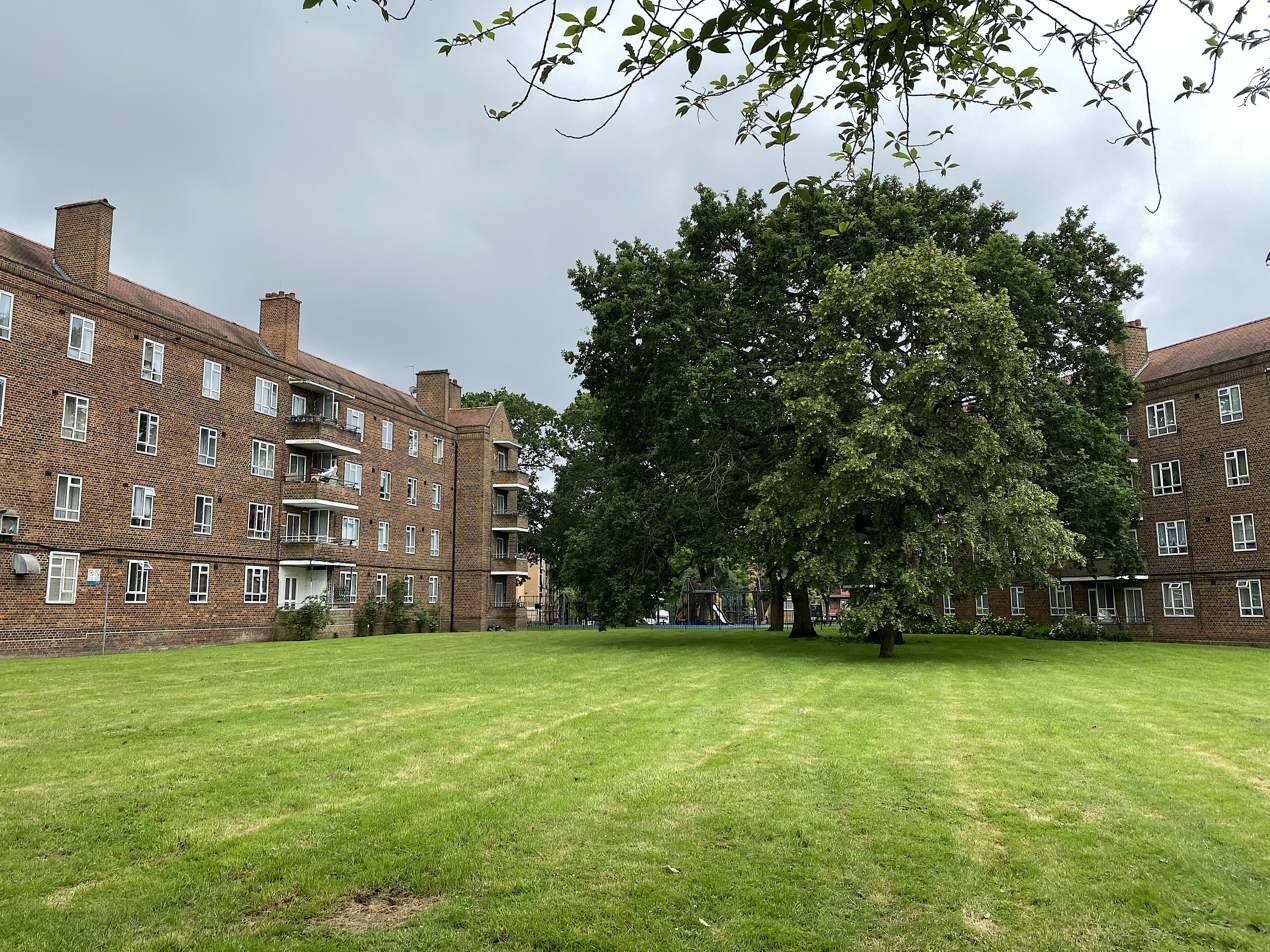
View of lime trees in between residential blocks

=== 21st century ===
A £20 million renovation of flats across the estate was announced to commence in March 2002. The works included improvements to communal outdoor spaces, refurbishment of internal and external fittings to flats, and improved security measures. Consultation on later works, including external wall insulation (EWI), initially raised concerns amongst residents over the cost of such upgrades and nature of the EWI. However, the subsequent refurbishment and EWI was the winning recipient of the Insulated Render and Cladding Association’s 2024 award.

In 2024 Historic England awarded funding toward research of the working class history of Kingswood Estate as part of their Everyday Heritage project.

== Amenities ==
Kingswood Estate was built to incorporate various amenities including schools, play areas, and a bijou shopping parade. The estate also benefits from nearby transport links such as Gipsy Hill station, local public spaces including Dulwich and Sydenham Hill woods, Crystal Palace Park, and is within walking distance of the Crystal Palace Triangle.

=== Arts centre ===
Following the COVID 19 pandemic a new community centre was opened in Kingswood House to serve the estate. Run by the non-profit company Kingswood Arts, the centre hosts community events, public performances, a youth club, and a café.

=== Recreation ===
In 2016, construction of a £60,000 Multi Use Games Area commissioned by the Kingswood Estate Tenants and Residents Association, and co-funded by Southwark Council and Veolia, was completed.

=== Schools ===
Dulwich Wood is the primary school located on the northern part of the estate. Constructed in the early 1950s, the school was designed by Robert Matthew and incorporated two murals from the Festival of Britain; the Marmalade Cat mural by Kathleen Hale was taken from the South Bank, and the Plankton mural by Gerald Holtom was from the Dome of Discovery. In 2024 Elkins Constructors funded an outdoor science area on the school site. Kingswood Estate also incorporates Kingsdale Foundation School, a secondary which opened as one of the first comprehensives.

=== Shopping parade ===
Kingswood Estate was designed to incorporate a small shopping parade on Seeley Drive. The current pedestrianised street includes Kingswood Library and a community timebank.

=== Transport ===
Sydenham Hill railway station, on the Chatham Main Line to Victoria, is located directly on the northern boundary of Kingswood Estate.

The estate is also served by bus route 450 and the nearby 3 route.
