= Kingswood House =

Community centre in Southwark

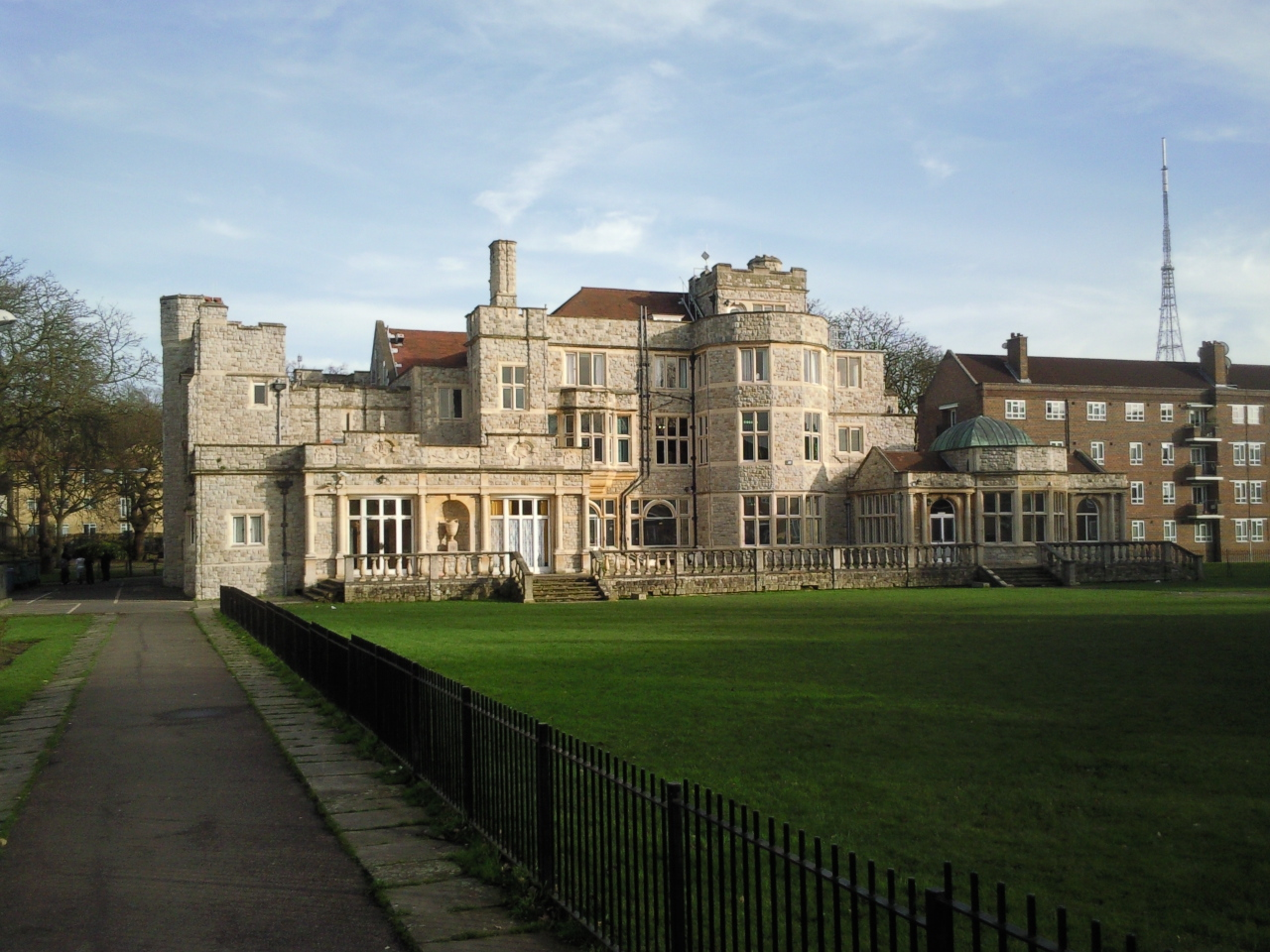
- Interactive map of the Kingswood House area
- Former names: Kingswood Lodge; King's Coppice
- Alternative names: Bovril Castle

General information
- Type: Cultural centre
- Architectural style: Jacobethan
- Classification: Grade II listed
- Location: Kingswood Estate, Seeley Drive, West Dulwich, SE21 8QN, London, England
- Current tenants: Kingswood House CIC
- Named for: King's Coppice
- Year built: 19th century
- Owner: London Borough of Southwark

Other information
- Public transit access: Sydenham Hill railway station

Website
- kingswoodarts.com

Kingswood House, colloquilly known as Bovril Castle, is a Victorian mansion in West Dulwich, at the southern tip of the London Borough of Southwark, United Kingdom. It is a Grade II listed building. It is now used as an arts and community centre called Kingswood Arts.

In 1811 William Vizard, the solicitor to Caroline of Brunswick in her future failed divorce from George IV, was granted a 63-year lease for Kingswood Lodge. When Vizard returned to his native Gloucestershire in 1831, others were granted the property leases.

From 1891 the house was owned by John Lawson Johnston, the inventor of Bovril, who extended the house and remodelled the facade including adding battlements. Johnston acquired the nickname Mr Bovril and, owing to its castellated features, Kingswood became known locally as Bovril Castle. Some remaining garden features from this era are thought to have been installed by James Pulham and Son.

In the First World War Kingswood was used as a convalescent home for wounded Canadian soldiers. At this time it came to the notice of Lady Vestey who was doing social work in connection with the soldiers housed there. In 1919 her husband Sir William Vestey was granted an 80-year lease and in 1921 when he was raised to the peerage he became Baron Vestey of Kingswood in the County of Surrey. Kingswood was the Vesteys' main home until William's death.

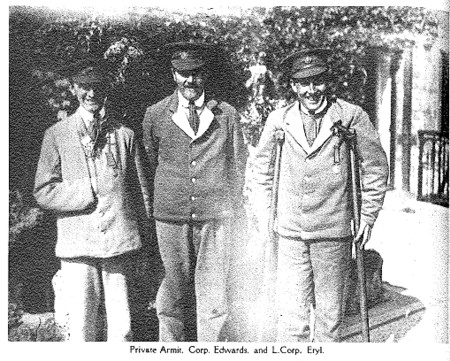
Portrait of soldiers recuperating at Kingswood House including Harold Leslie Edwards (centre), 24 May 1917. Image held by University of Guelph Library

In 1954 it was decided by the then Metropolitan Borough of Camberwell to turn the building into a library and community centre, for the benefit of Kingswood Estate residents, and in 1956 the council acquired the site by compulsory purchase. Lord Vestey's estate had by then been developed into a large residential area, with the grounds occupied by houses, flats and shops. In 1965 it became the property of the London Borough of Southwark. It underwent substantial refurbishment in the 1980s and 1990s, and was subsequently used for conferences, meetings and civil marriages.

In the grounds in front of Kingswood House there are still some remains of the Pulham features. In 2005 a tapestry was made by over 100 local residents depicting the history of the house. In 2011 a blue plaque was erected on the side of the building to commemorate John Lawson Johnston and his residence there.

== Library ==
From 1956 to 2020, while run as a public building by the local council, the house housed a public library. An opening ceremony was hosted by actor Peter Ustinov and the then Camberwell mayor Alderman John Evans, who used the opportunity of the library to read up on Ustinov, saying: "I looked up 'Who’s Who' and anyone who wants to know something about our distinguished visitor can find it in the library."

It was remarked at the ceremony that the house was now "as it should be", for the community and "not something reserved for one select and privileged family".

In the 1960s the house was used to store the then Camberwell borough's library service reserve stock collection.

In 1993 the library was threatened with closure, with the suggestion that it could move into a space at the Seeley Drive shops. The community ran a Save the Library campaign, gathering 720 signatures in a petition.

Between 2014 and 2019 the library's funding was cut to nearly half, from £23,885 to £12,618. The library in the house closed in 2020 at the beginning of the COVID-19 pandemic. In 2023, a new Kingswood Library opened opposite the house at a shop unit on Seeley Drive.

== Present day ==
In 2022 Kingswood Arts, a CIC set up by Hartshorn Hook Enterprises, took over the venue as an arts centre. The building was restored and opened to the public as a performing arts centre, with a café and regular events, starting from April 2023. However, by 2025 the CIC had gone into administration, with Hartshorn Hook forming a new company to continue to run the centre.
