= Sydenham Hill =

Affluent locality in southeast London

Coordinates: 51.4329°N 0.0690°W

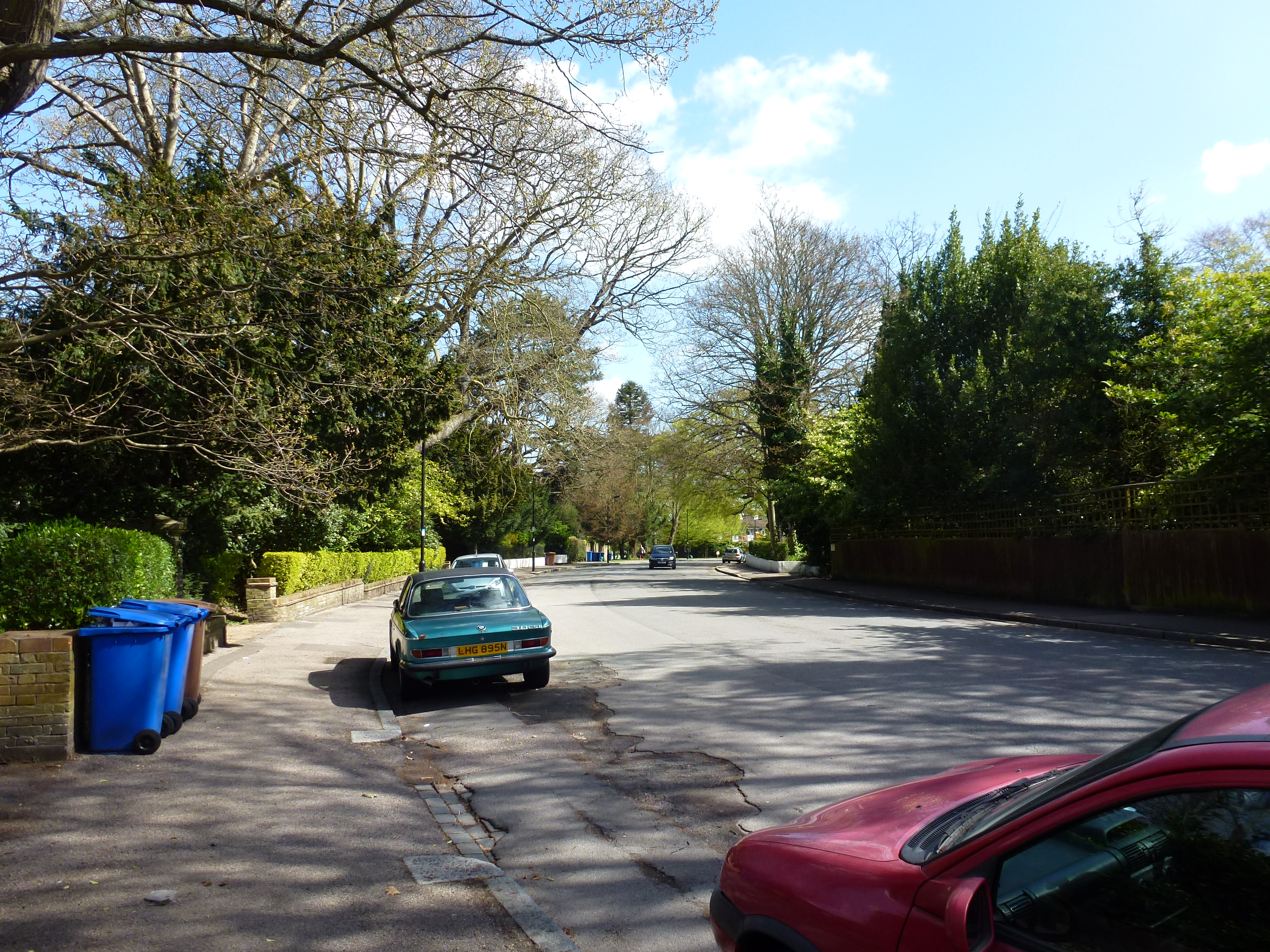
- Crescent Wood Road

- Location within Greater London
- London borough: Southwark; Lewisham
- Ceremonial county: Greater London
- Region: London
- Country: England
- Sovereign state: United Kingdom
- Post town: LONDON
- Postcode district: SE21, SE26, SE23
- Dialling code: 020
- Police: Metropolitan
- Fire: London
- Ambulance: London
- UK Parliament: Lewisham West & East Dulwich
- London Assembly: Lambeth and Southwark; Greenwich and Lewisham
- Website: http://sydenham.org.uk/

Sydenham Hill forms part of a longer ridge and is an affluent locality in southeast London. It is also the name of a road which runs along the northeastern part of the ridge, demarcating the London Boroughs of Southwark, Bromley, and Lewisham. Its highest part is the apex of the Boroughs of Southwark and Lewisham and the 15th-highest peak in London, at 367 feet (112 m).

The road connects the A205 road in the northeast at Forest Hill with the A212 road to the southwest at Crystal Palace. Sydenham Hill railway station, Sydenham Hill Wood nature reserve and Dulwich and Sydenham Hill Golf course are on its west slopes thus in the Borough of Southwark. The London boroughs of Lambeth and Croydon have part of the hill within their jurisdiction.

== Geography ==
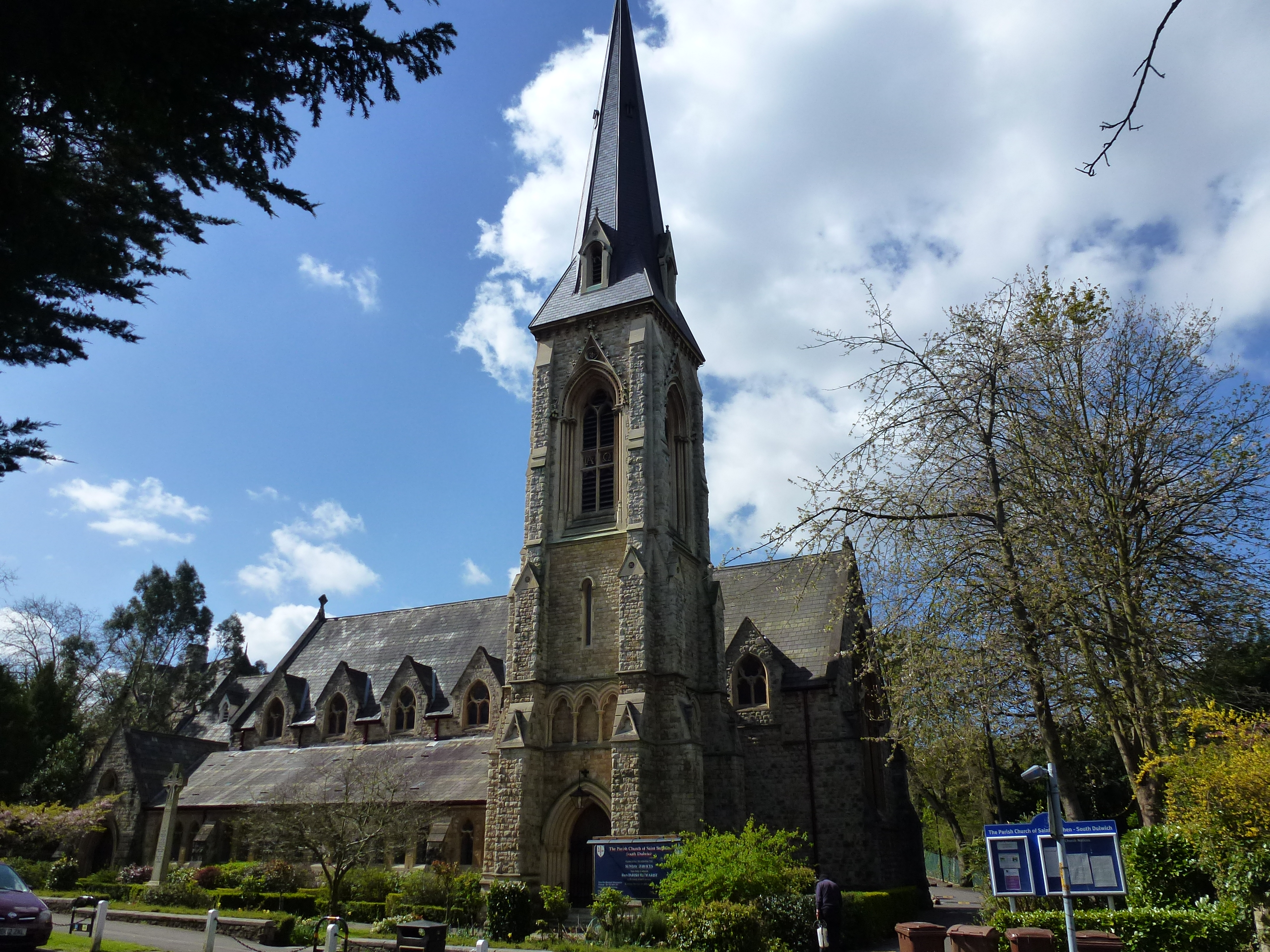
College Road, SE21, Sydenham Hill

Sydenham Hill is approximately 5.6 miles to the southeast of Charing Cross. It is also at the centre of many of south London's major shopping districts being 3.6 miles south of Lewisham, 4.6 miles northwest of Bromley and 4 miles north of Croydon.

Sydenham Hill (as well as Upper Sydenham) is on the large Norwood Ridge formed of London Claygate beds deposits. As a result, Sydenham Hill is one of the highest points in London at 367 feet (112 m). Sydenham Hill Wood is a nine-hectare nature reserve west of Sydenham Hill Road, along with Dulwich and Sydenham Hill Golf course. The hill was once covered by the Great North Wood which covered all of Sydenham, Norwood, Woodside, Gipsy Hill etc.

== History ==
The hill is the summit of the uppermost or eastern ridge of the Norwood Ridge which in turn was for several millennia covered by the Great North Wood but sits on thin topsoil. In the 19th century Sydenham Hill became a fashionable area, with a large number of large residential properties built along Sydenham Hill, including Grange Court (1861), The Wood (1840), Dilkhoosh (now Fountain House) (1864), Highfield (1855), The Cedars (1894), Sydenham Hill House (1898), Dulwich Wood House (1858), Beltwood House (1851) and Castlebar (1879). The writer Joseph Ashby-Sterry was born into a Sydenham Hill family in 1836 or 1838. In 1854, the area's importance was increased after the Crystal Palace was relocated from Hyde Park and re-erected on the south-western end of the ridge.

In 1863, the Chatham Main Line was opened by the London, Chatham and Dover Railway, bringing the railway to Sydenham Hill. Construction involved building a 1.2 mile (1,958 metre) tunnel through the hill, starting at College Road, going under Sydenham, and ending below the Brighton Main Line at Penge. 19 years later in 1884, another line was opened, this time to serve the Crystal Palace. The line had a new station at Upper Sydenham on the southern edge of the ridge, with direct trains to London Victoria via Peckham Rye. However, the line was poorly used, and the destruction of the Crystal Palace made the situation worse, despite the rapid growth of the area. The railway line finally closed in 1954 leaving an abandoned tunnel within the Sydenham Hill Woods.

== Area ==
The area west and north of Sydenham Hill road and Dulwich Wood is widely known as Dulwich, mostly corresponding to the postal code area (SE21), with the east side of the woods being known simply as Sydenham, or Upper Sydenham, corresponding to the SE26 postal area. Sydenham Hill road and the ridge line marks the southern and eastern boundary of the Dulwich Estate.

The area is almost 100% residential and have many large homes dating from the 1800s. As of April 2015, the estimated average house price on College Road is £854,149, while on Sydenham Hill (road) the average is £437,478, with both roads having homes in the £1–6 million range. Peckarmans Wood and Great Brownings are examples of mid-century modern estates designed by Austin Vernon and Partners for the Dulwich Estate. College Road is a private road, with a toll towards Hunts Slip Road, dating back to the 1780s. On the other side of the railway is the Kingswood Estate, with the Dulwich Wood Primary, Kingsdale Foundation schools and the Kingswood House Community Centre.

Other roads on the hill include: Crescent Wood Road; Woodhall Drive; and, Hitherwood Drive.

== Transport ==
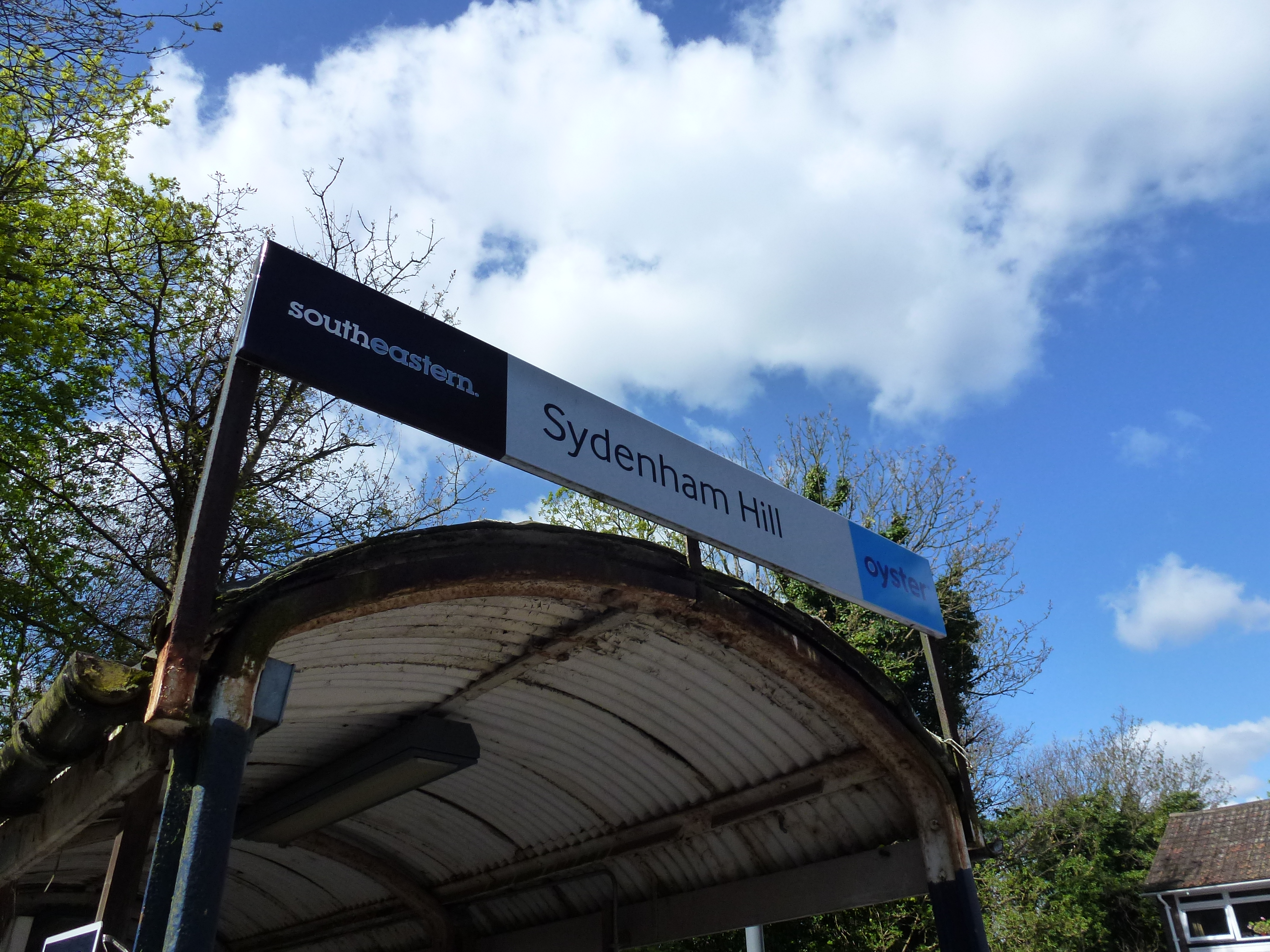
Sydenham Hill station

=== Bus ===
Transport for London bus routes 202, 356, 363, N63 run along the Sydenham Hill road. Route 450 serves Fountain Drive.

=== Railway ===
Sydenham Hill railway station is on the private College Road, with another entrance in the Kingswood Estate. The station is served by Southeastern services to London Victoria, Herne Hill, Beckenham Junction, Bromley South and Orpington, with a frequency of every 15 minutes Monday to Saturday, 30 minutes on Sundays. Sydenham Hill is one of a handful of stations in London not to have a dedicated bus stop, with the closest being on Kingswood Drive, 0.3 miles away.

== Gallery of affluent and historic housing on Sydenham Hill ==
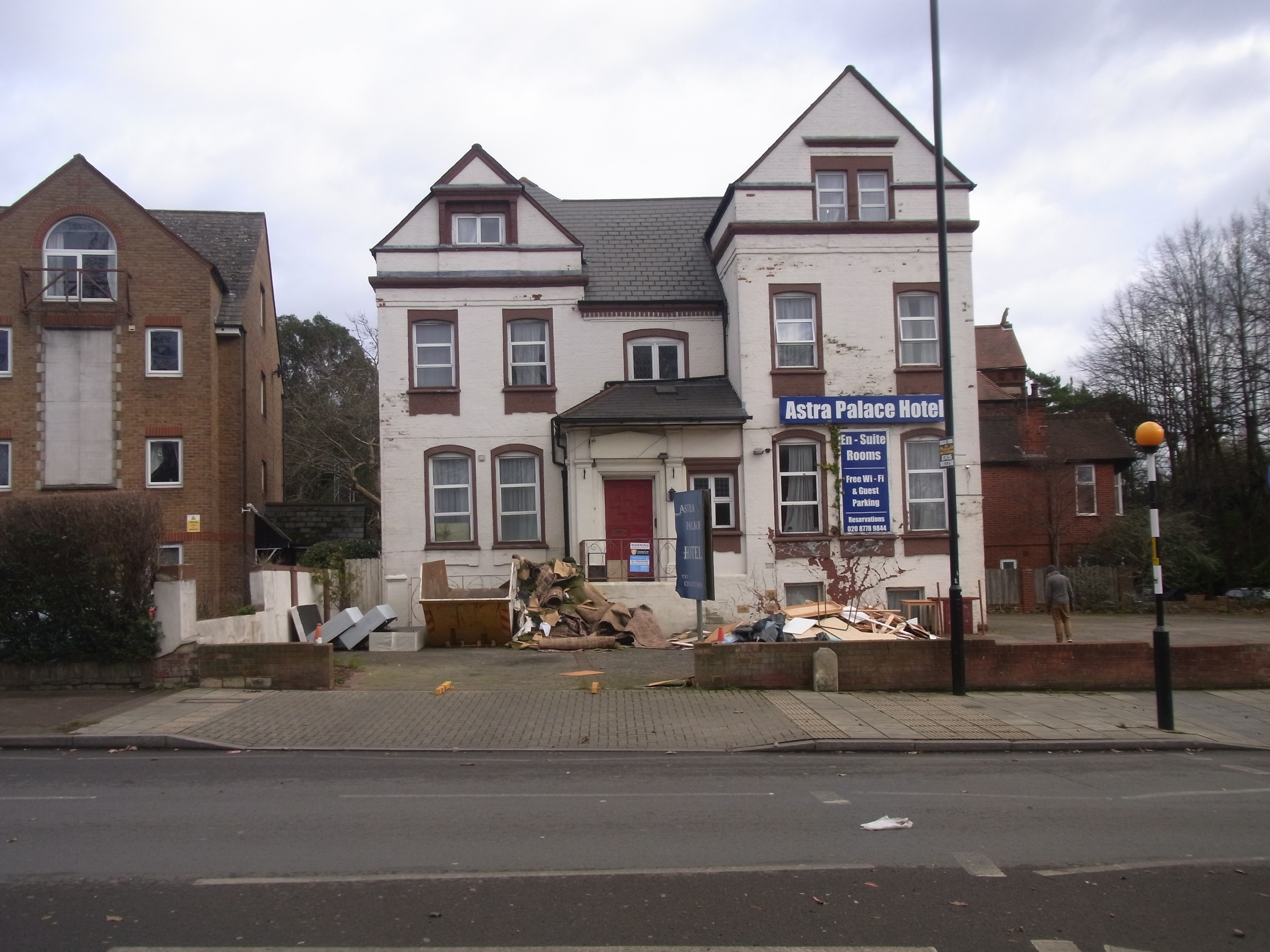
2 Sydenham Hill, London Borough of Southwark

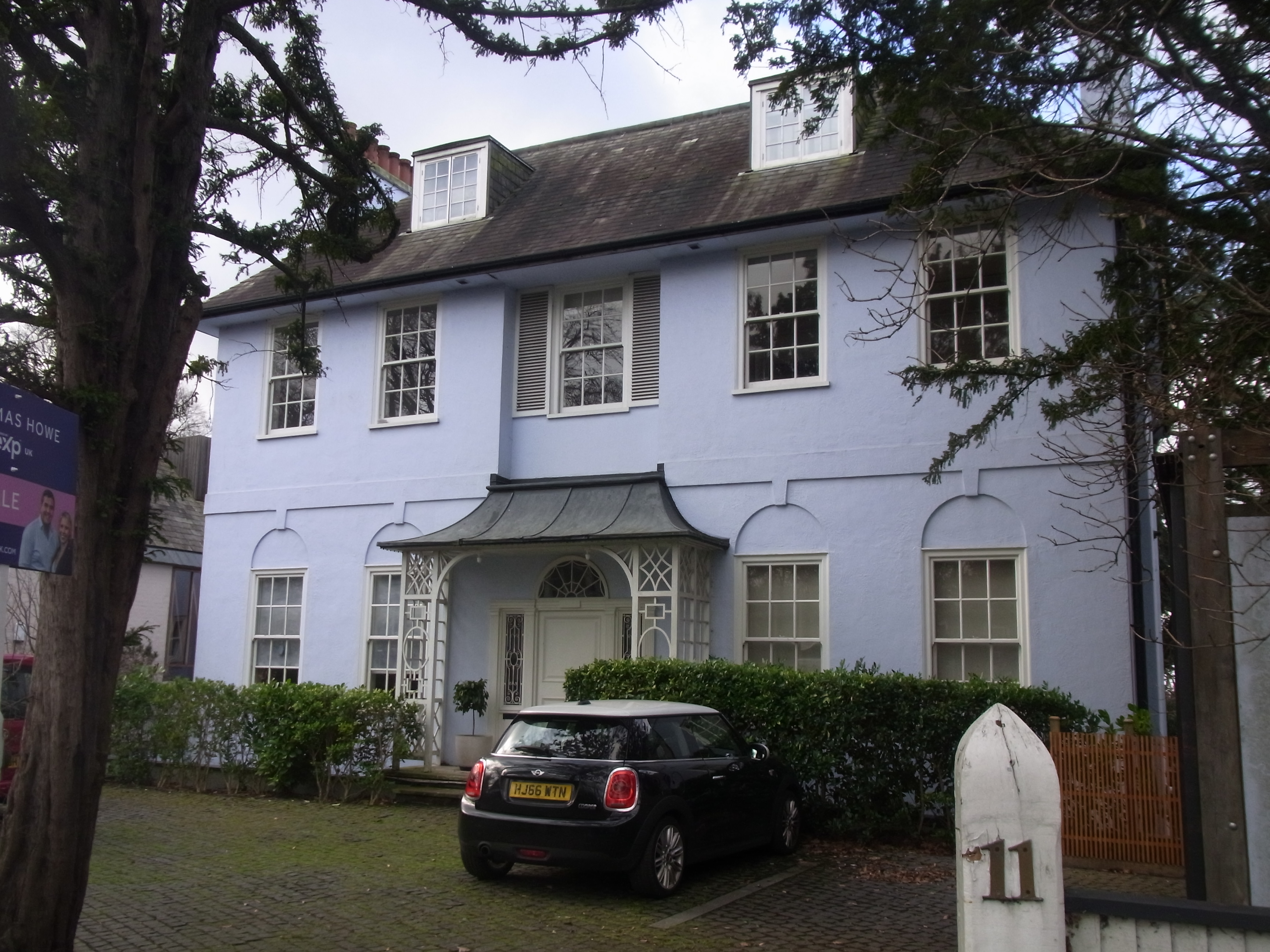
11 Sydenham Hill (Rotherwood), London Borough of Southwark

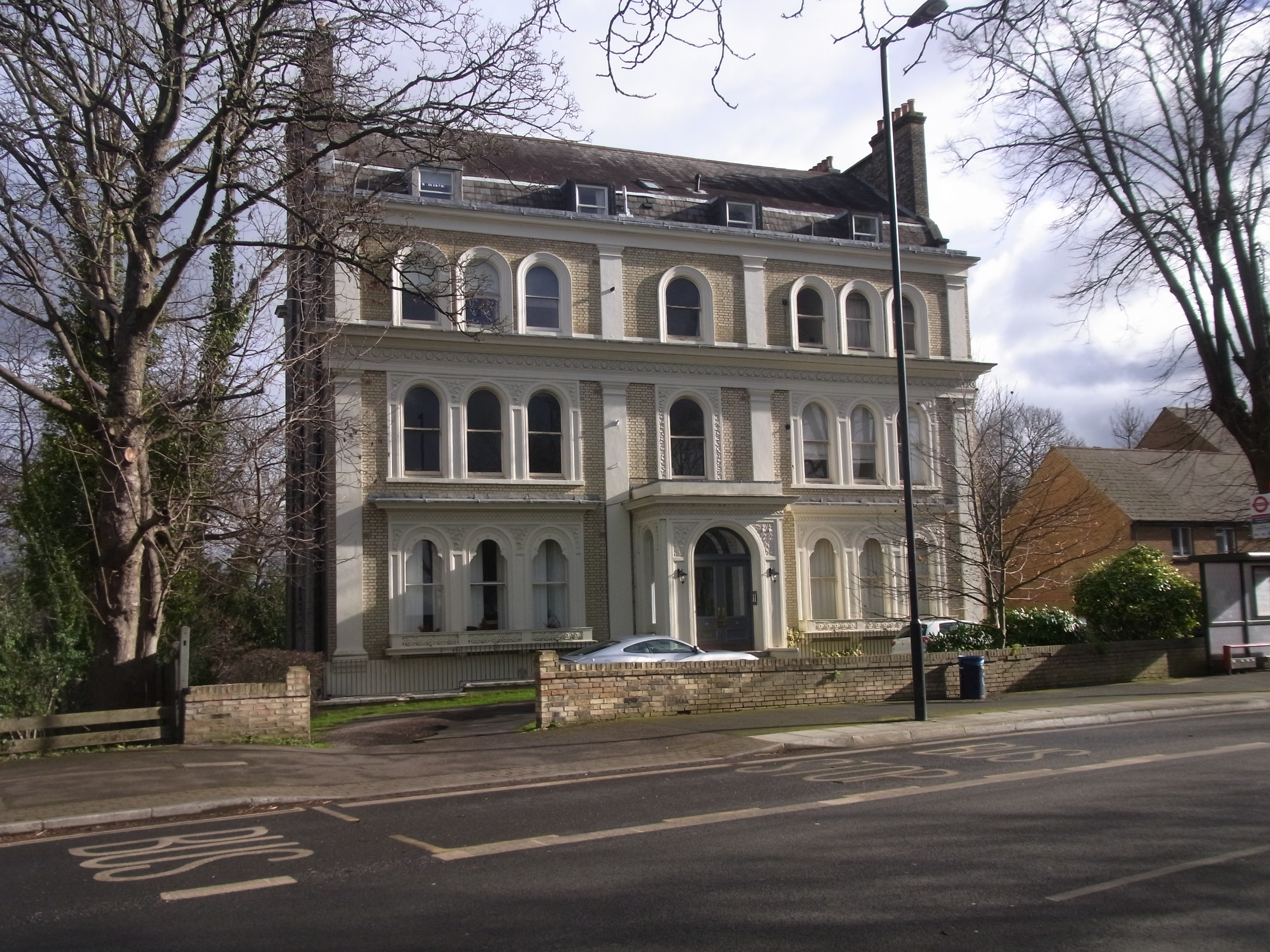
12 Sydenham Hill (Grange Court, built 1861), London Borough of Southwark

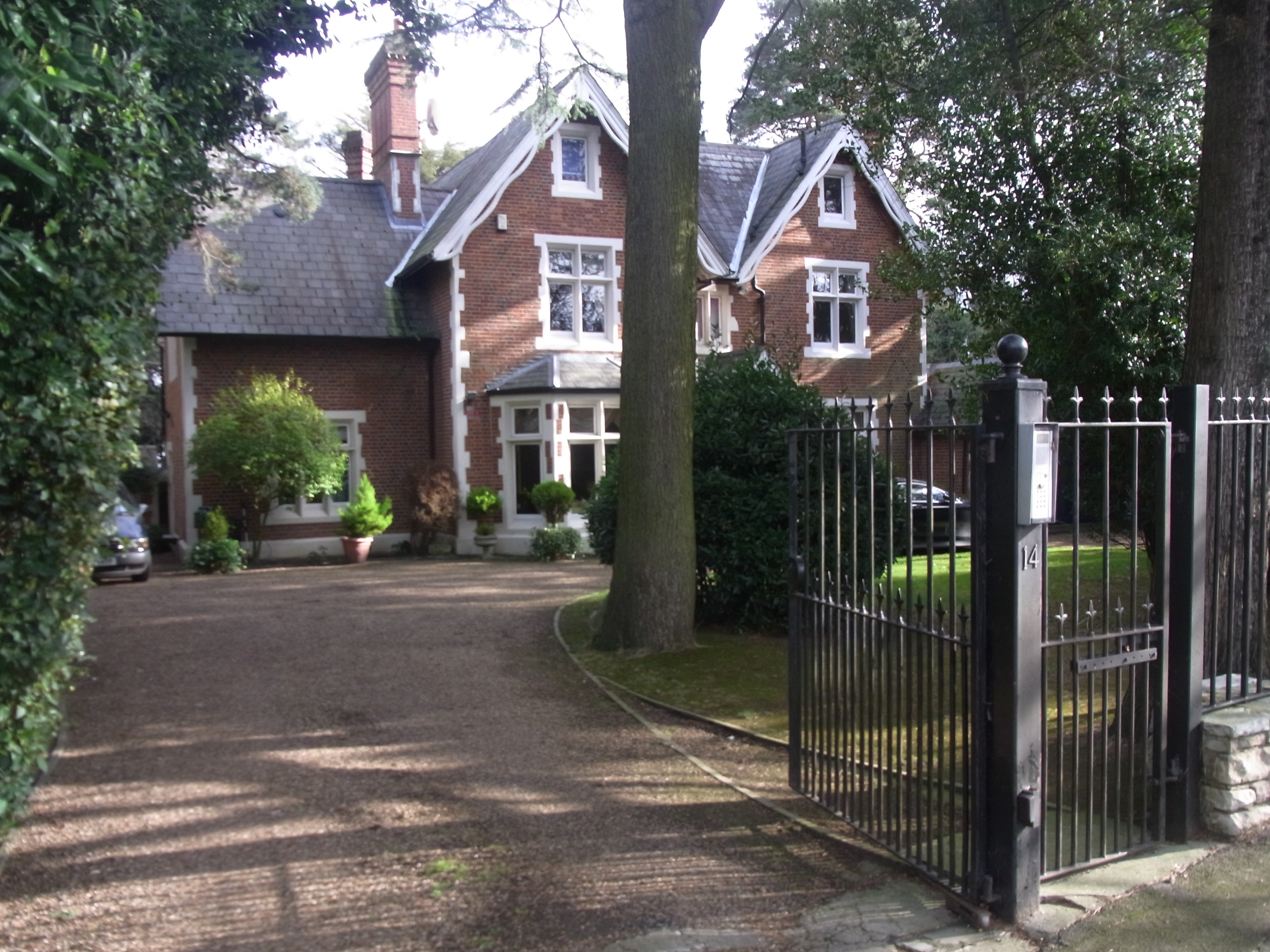
14 Sydenham Hill, London Borough of Southwark

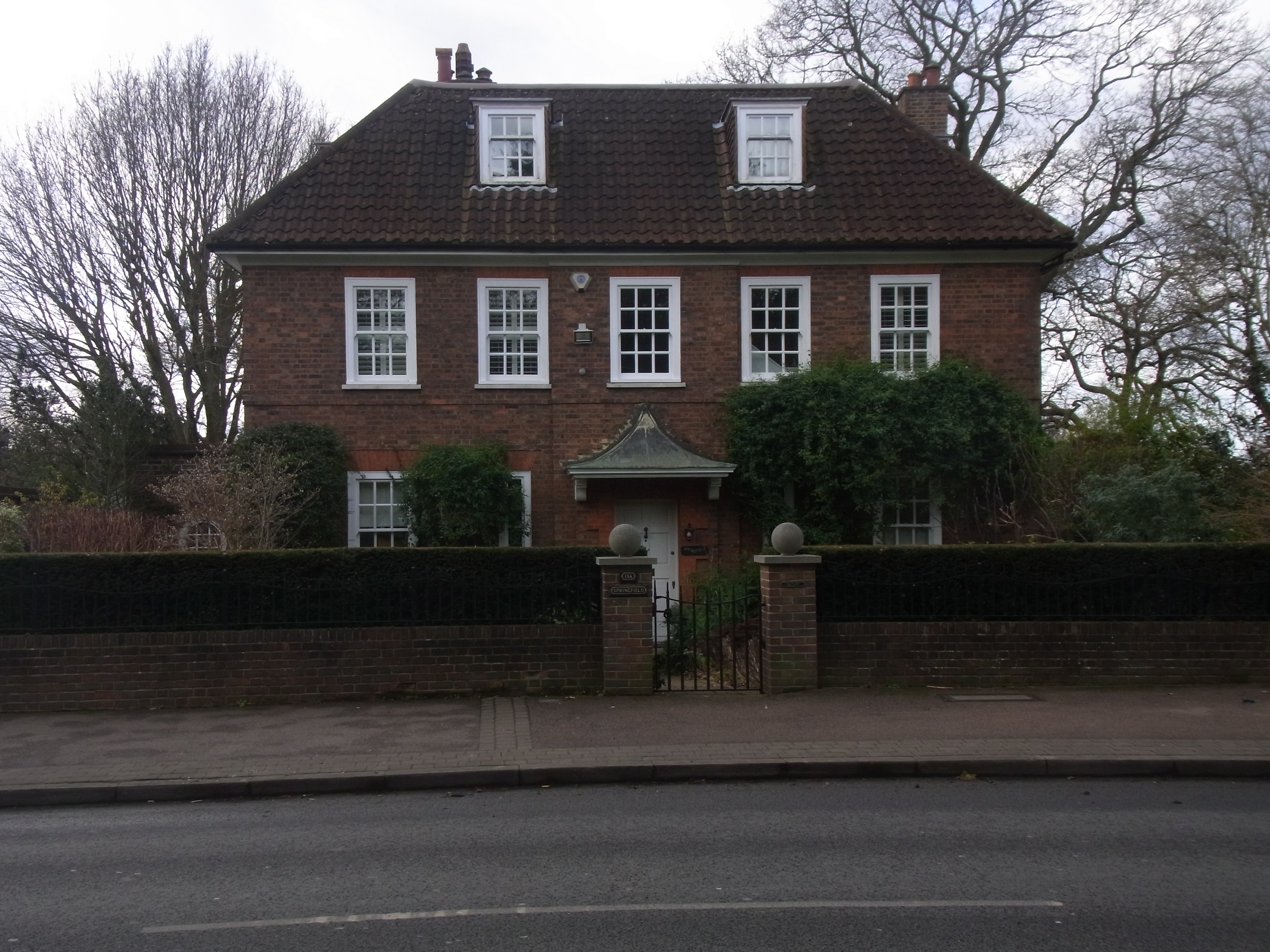
15A Sydenham Hill, London Borough of Southwark

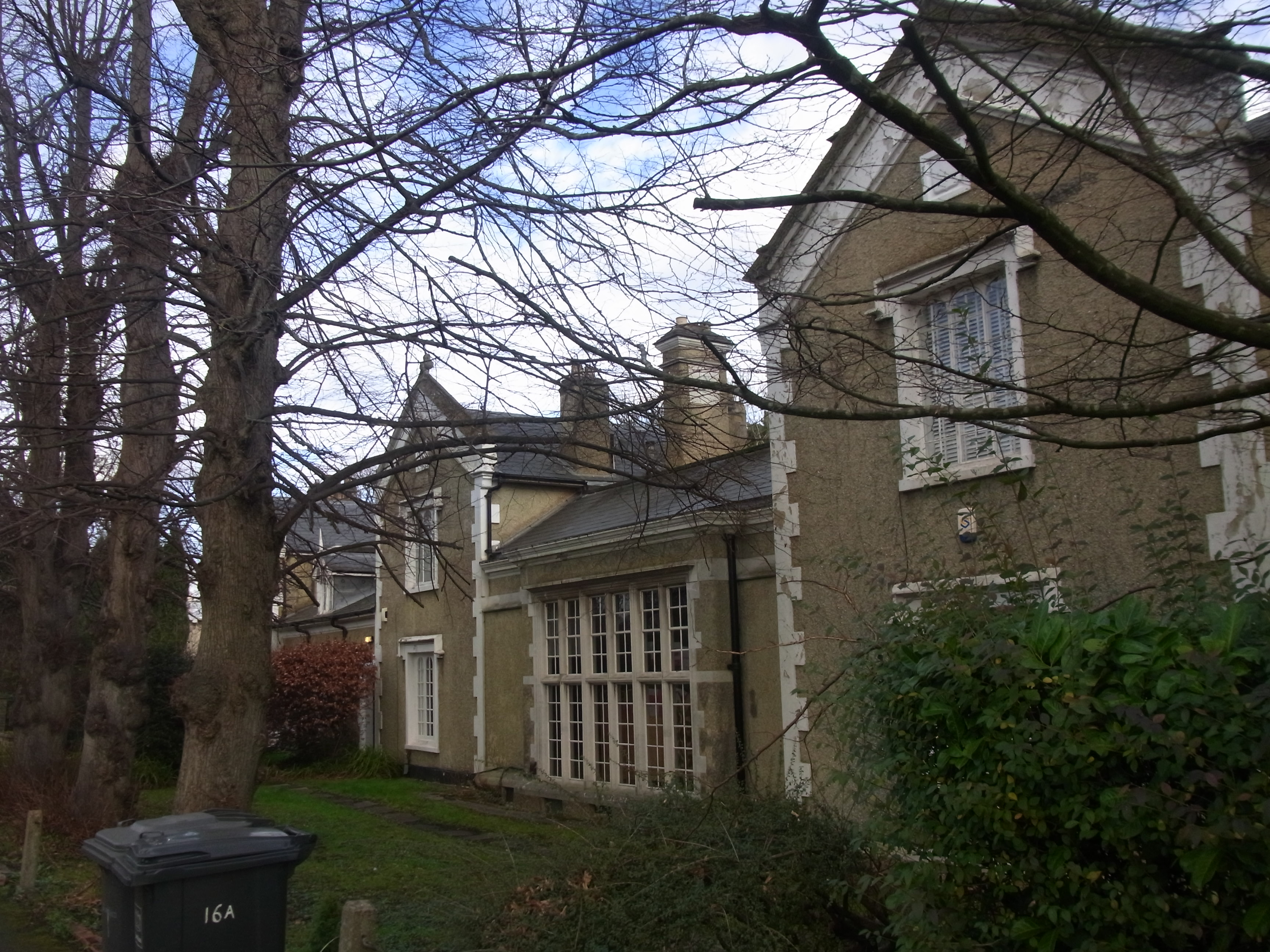
16 Sydenham Hill (The Wood, built 1840), London Borough of Southwark

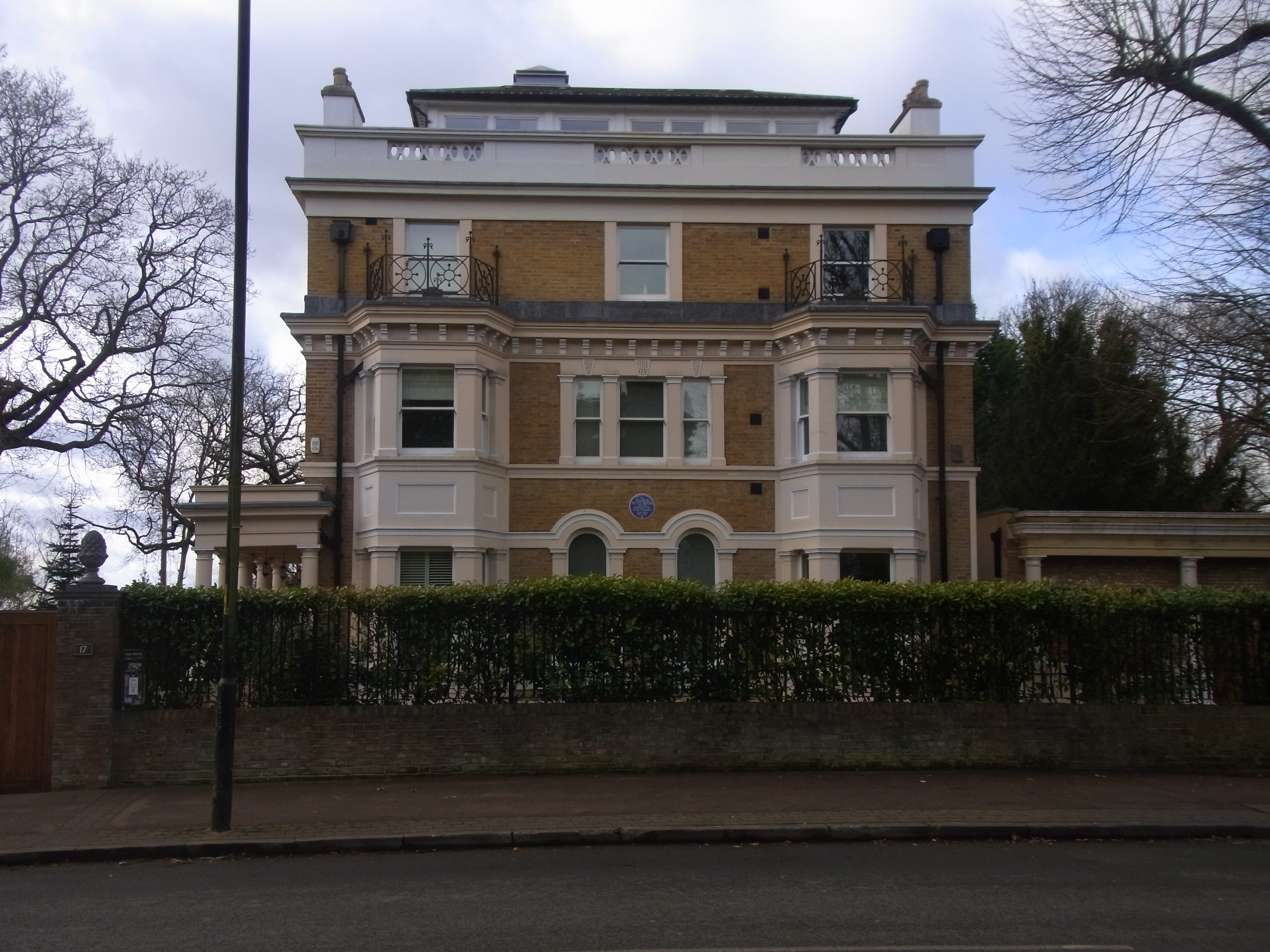
17 Sydenham Hill (Fountain House, built 1864), London Borough of Southwark

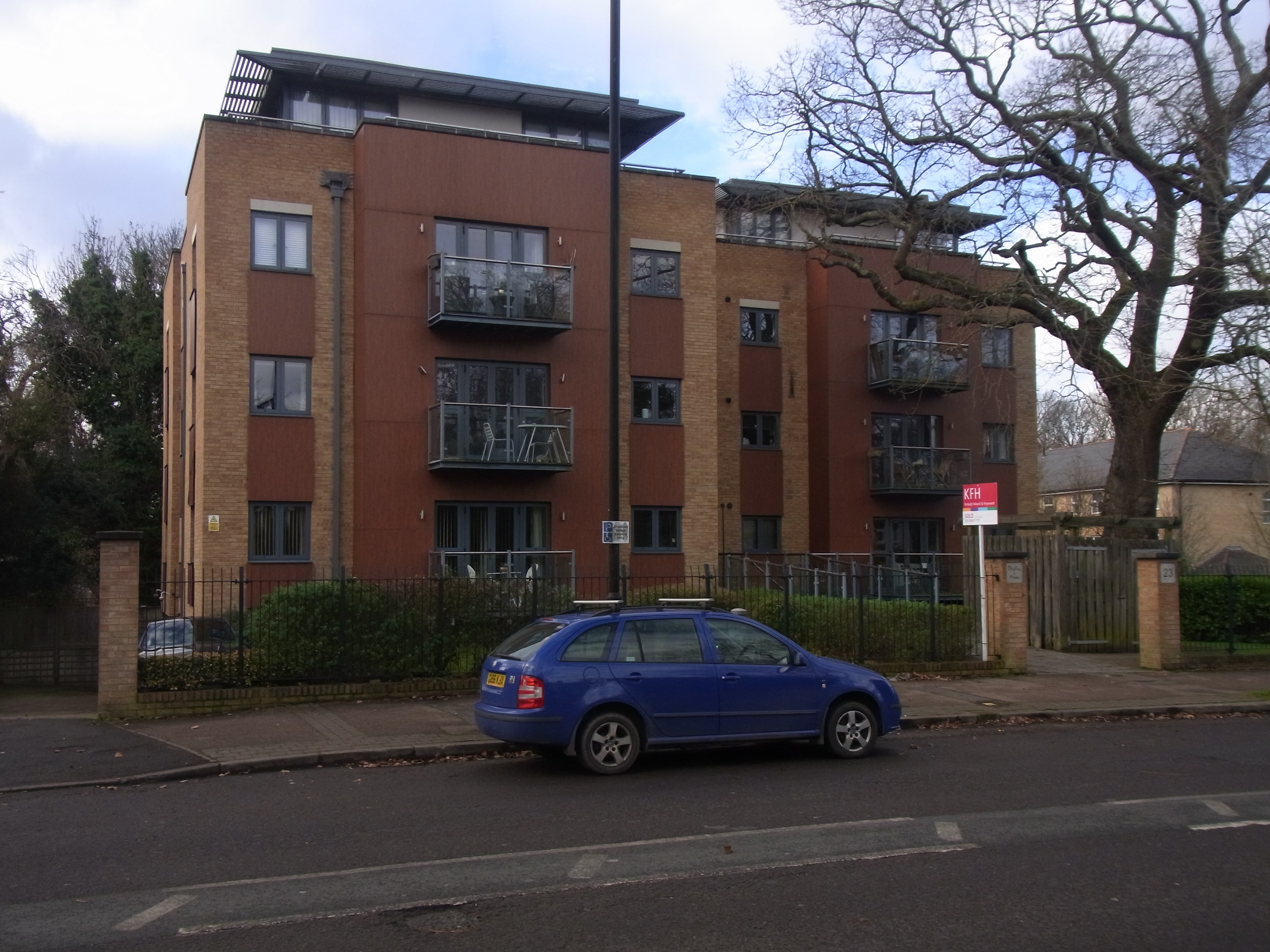
23 Sydenham Hill, London Borough of Southwark

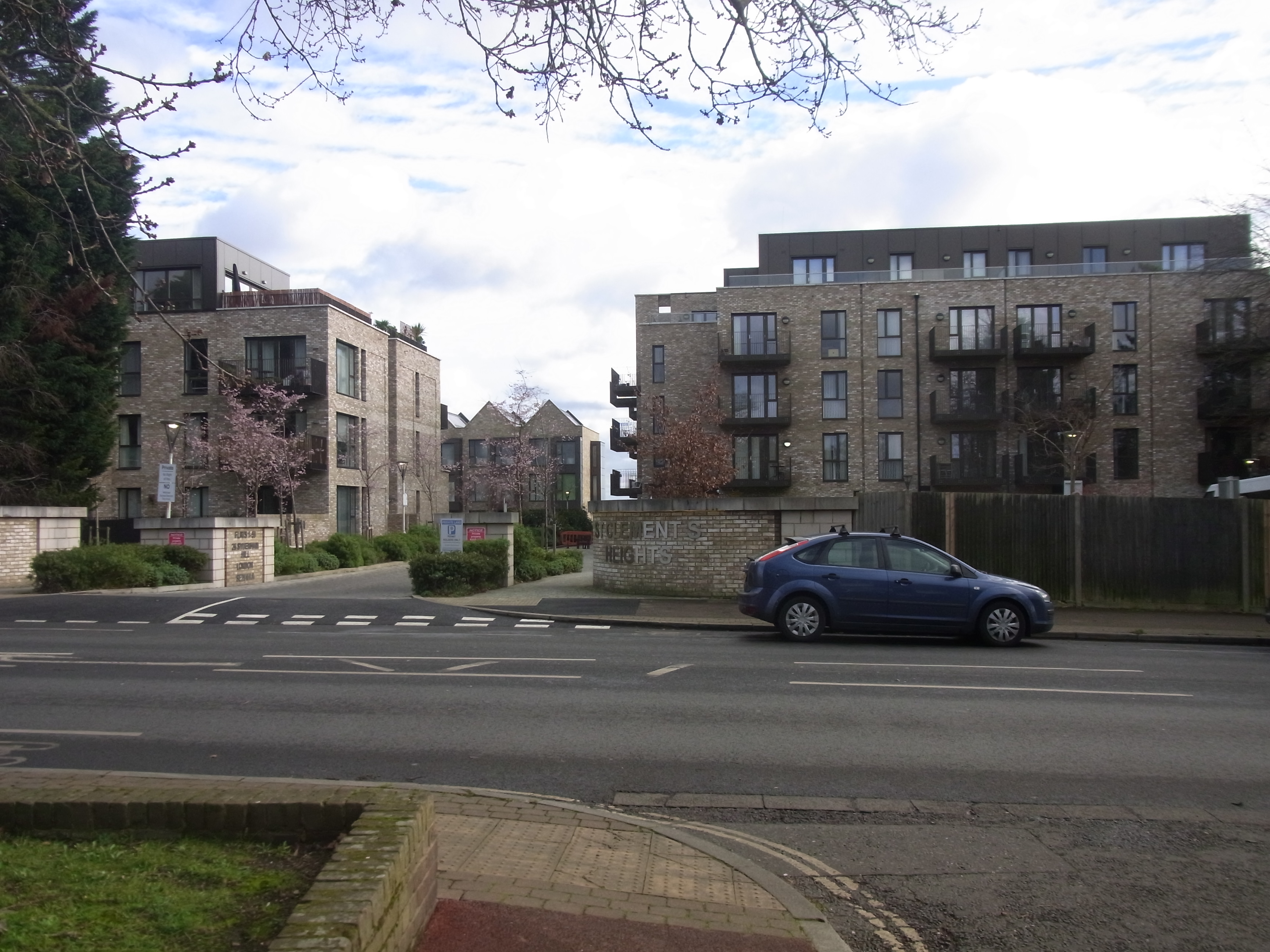
26 Sydenham Hill, London Borough of Southwark

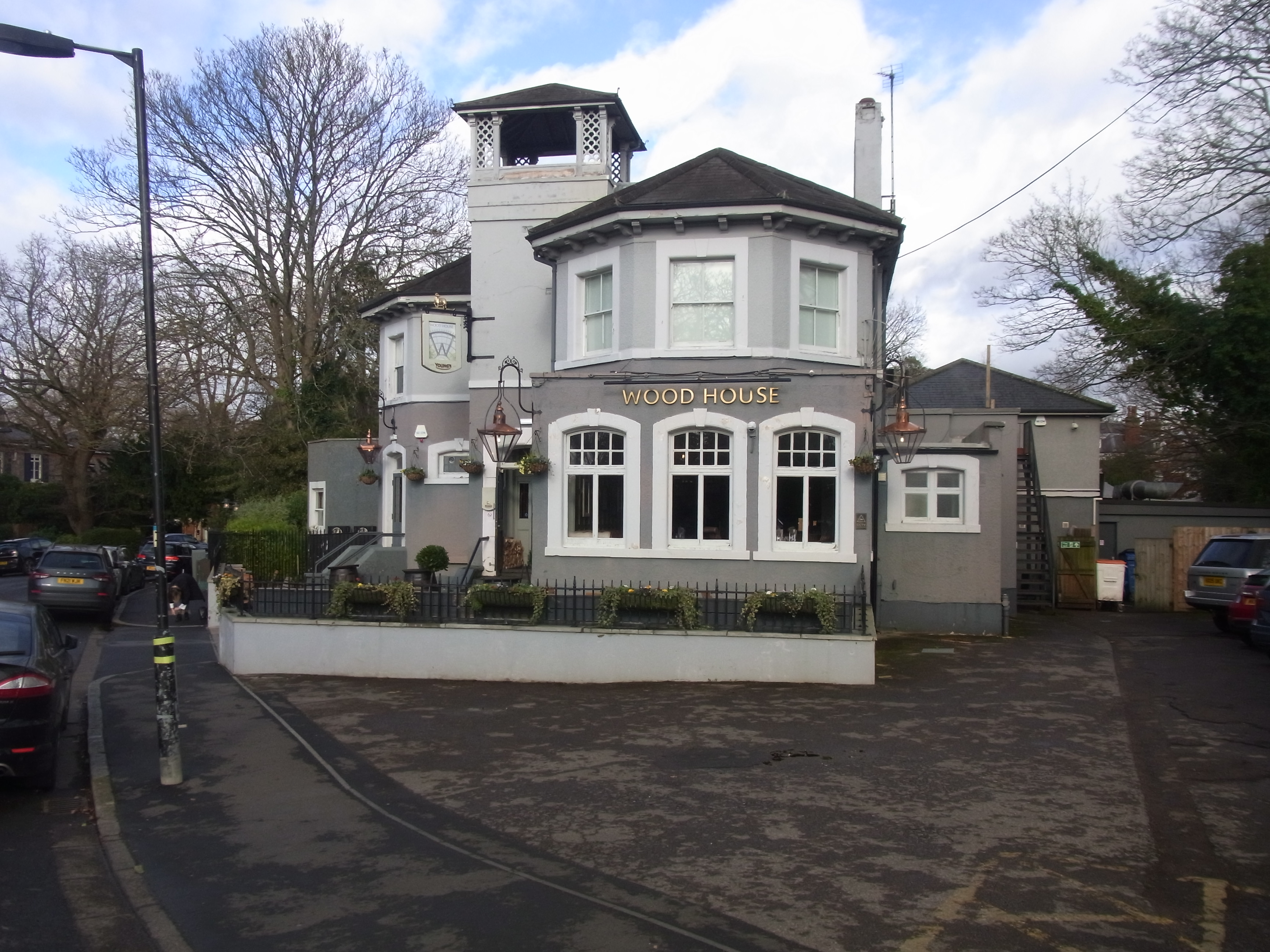
Wood House Pub, built 1858, Sydenham Hill, corner of southern junction with Crescent Wood Road, London Borough of Southwark

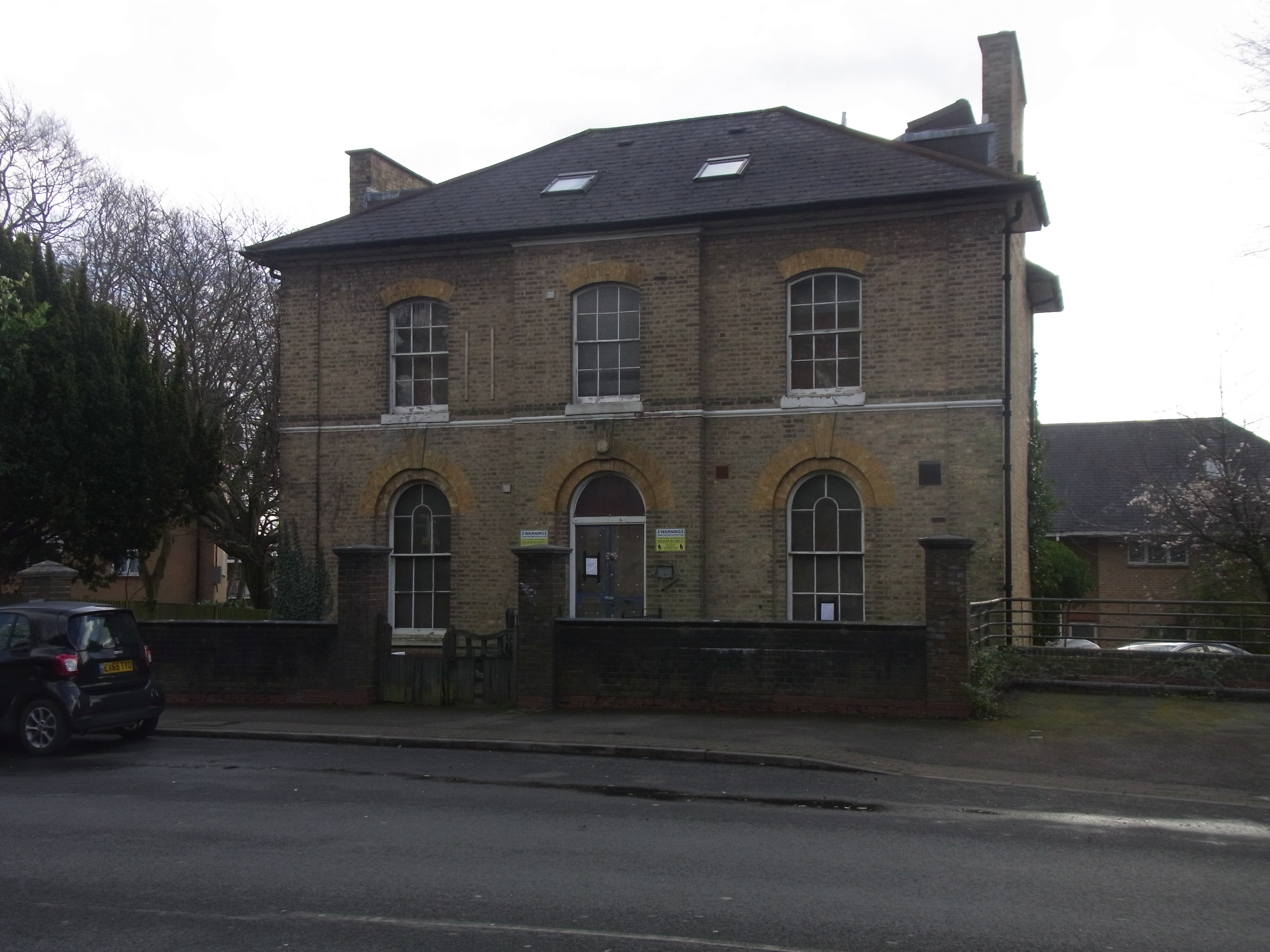
28 Sydenham Hill (Highfield, built 1855), London Borough of Southwark

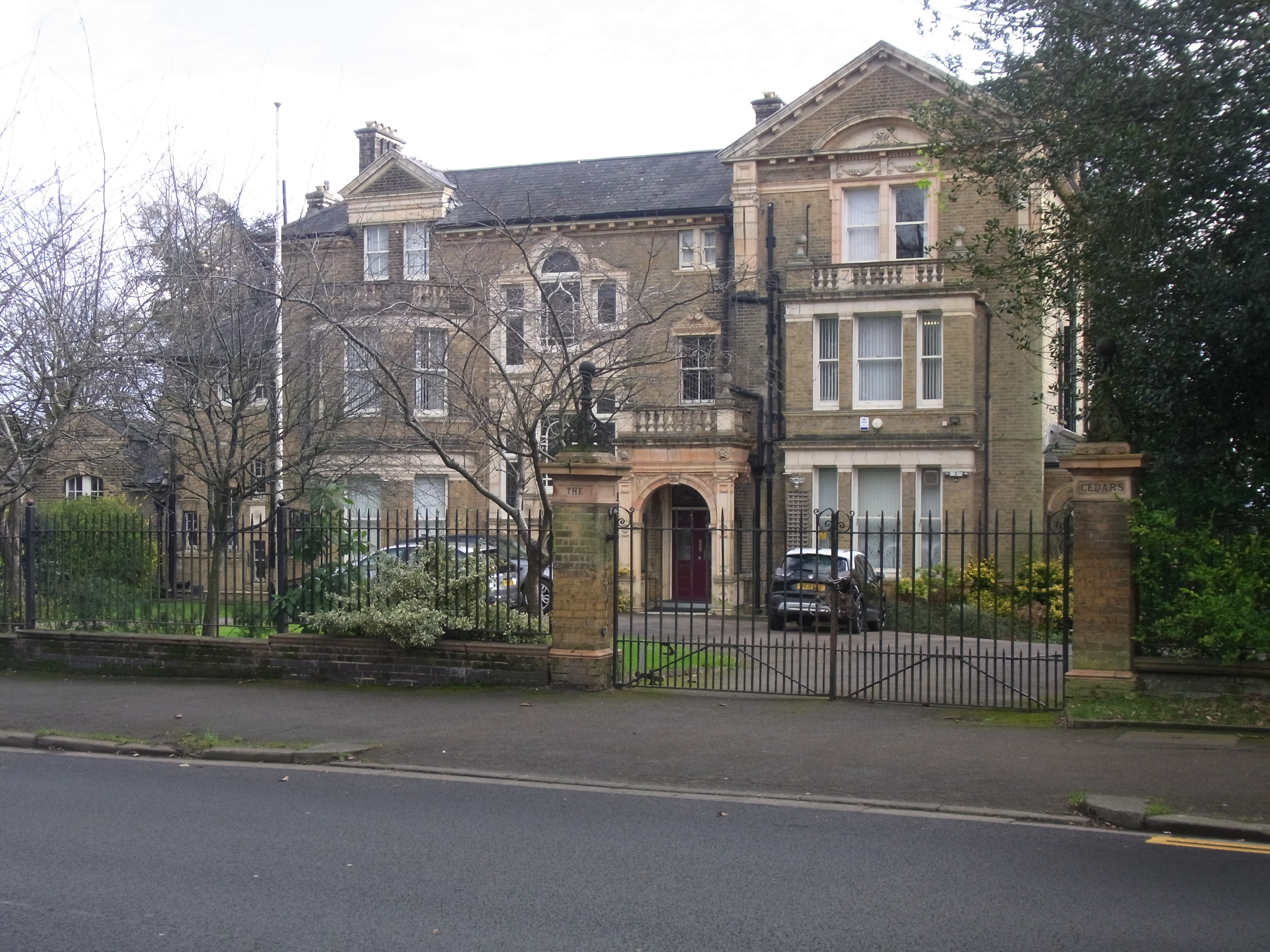
34 Sydenham Hill (The Cedars, built 1894), London Borough of Lewisham

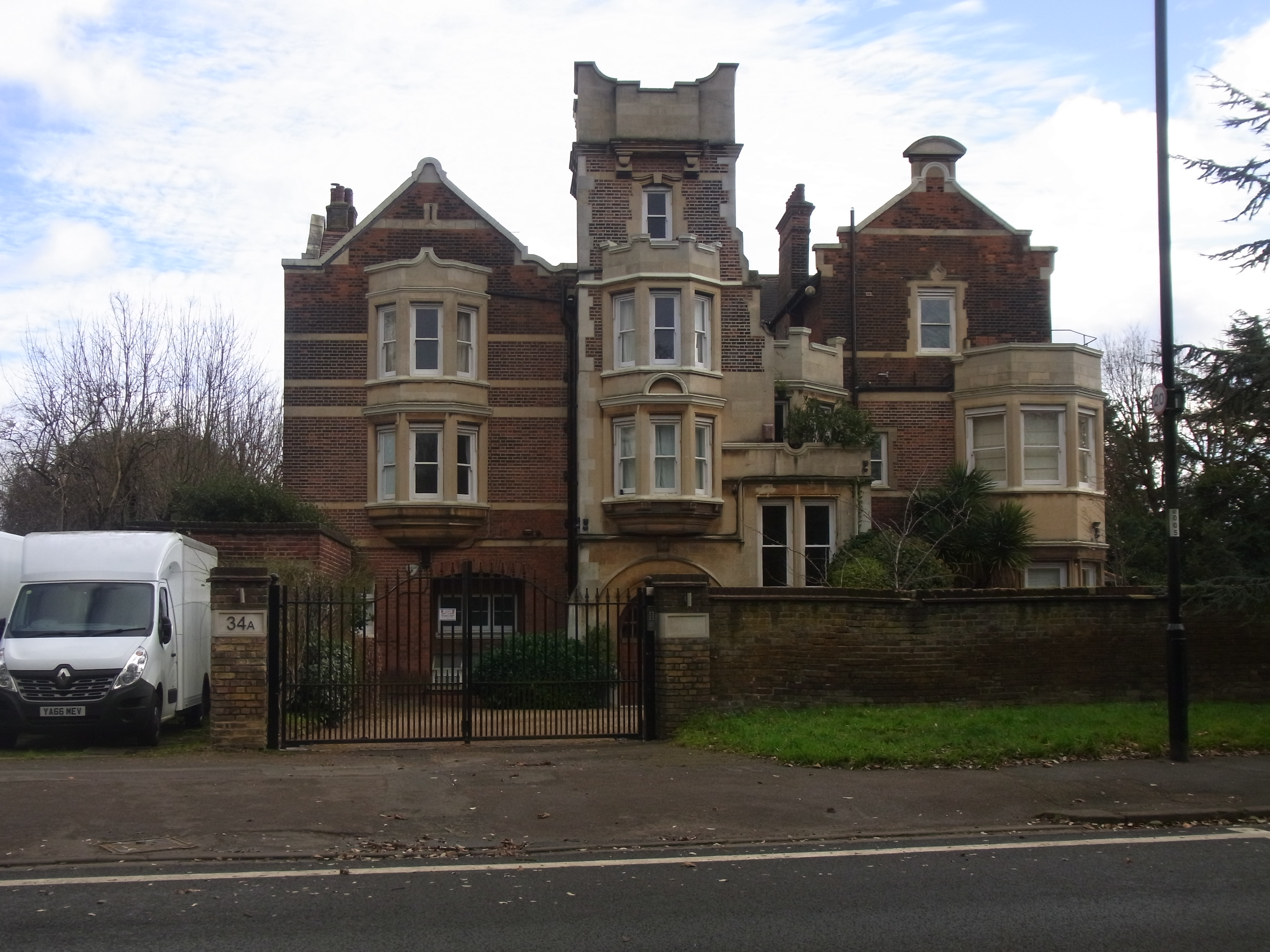
34A Sydenham Hill (Sydenham Hill House, built 1898), London Borough of Lewisham

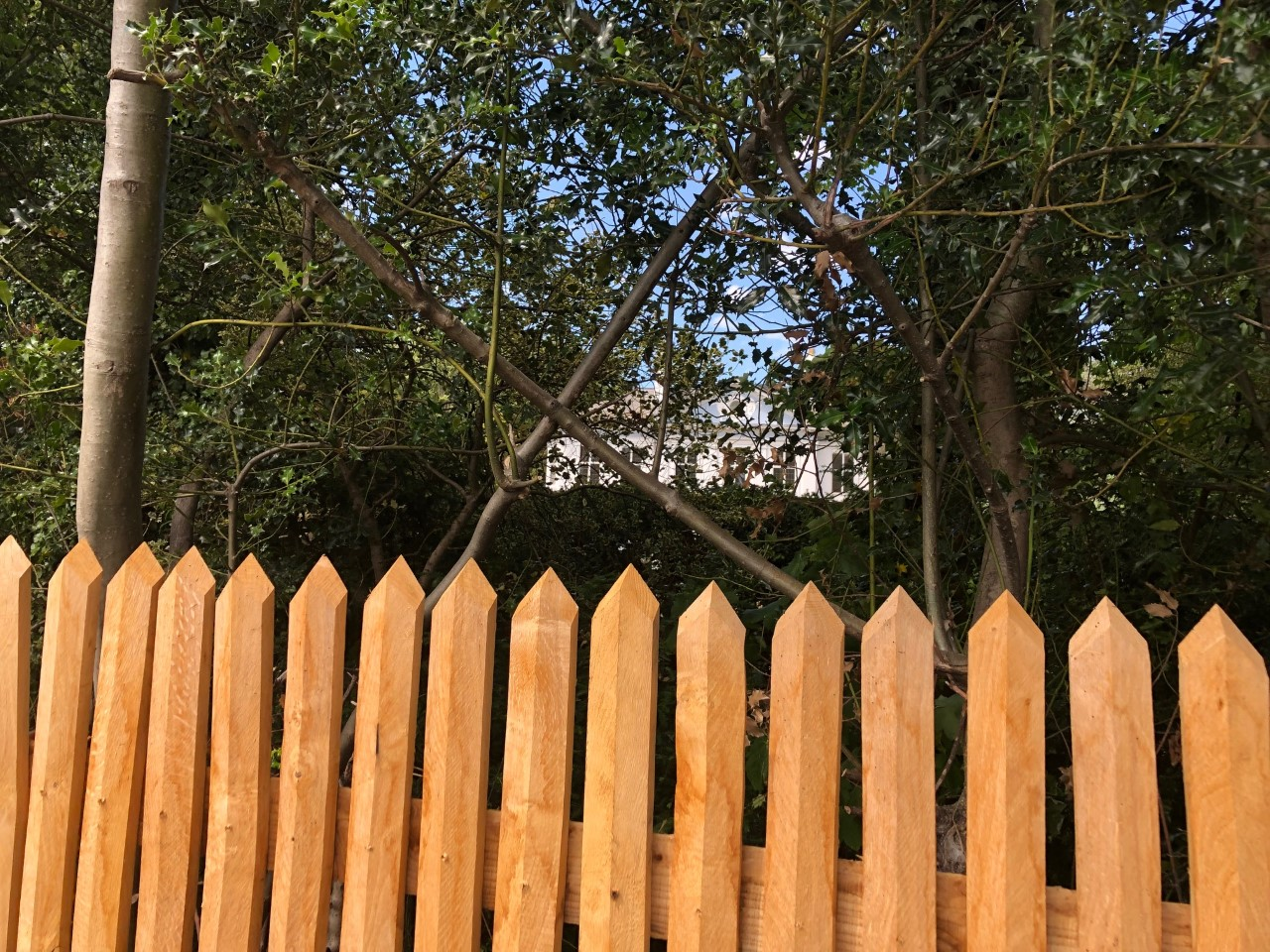
41 Sydenham Hill (Beltwood House, built 1851), London Borough of Southwark

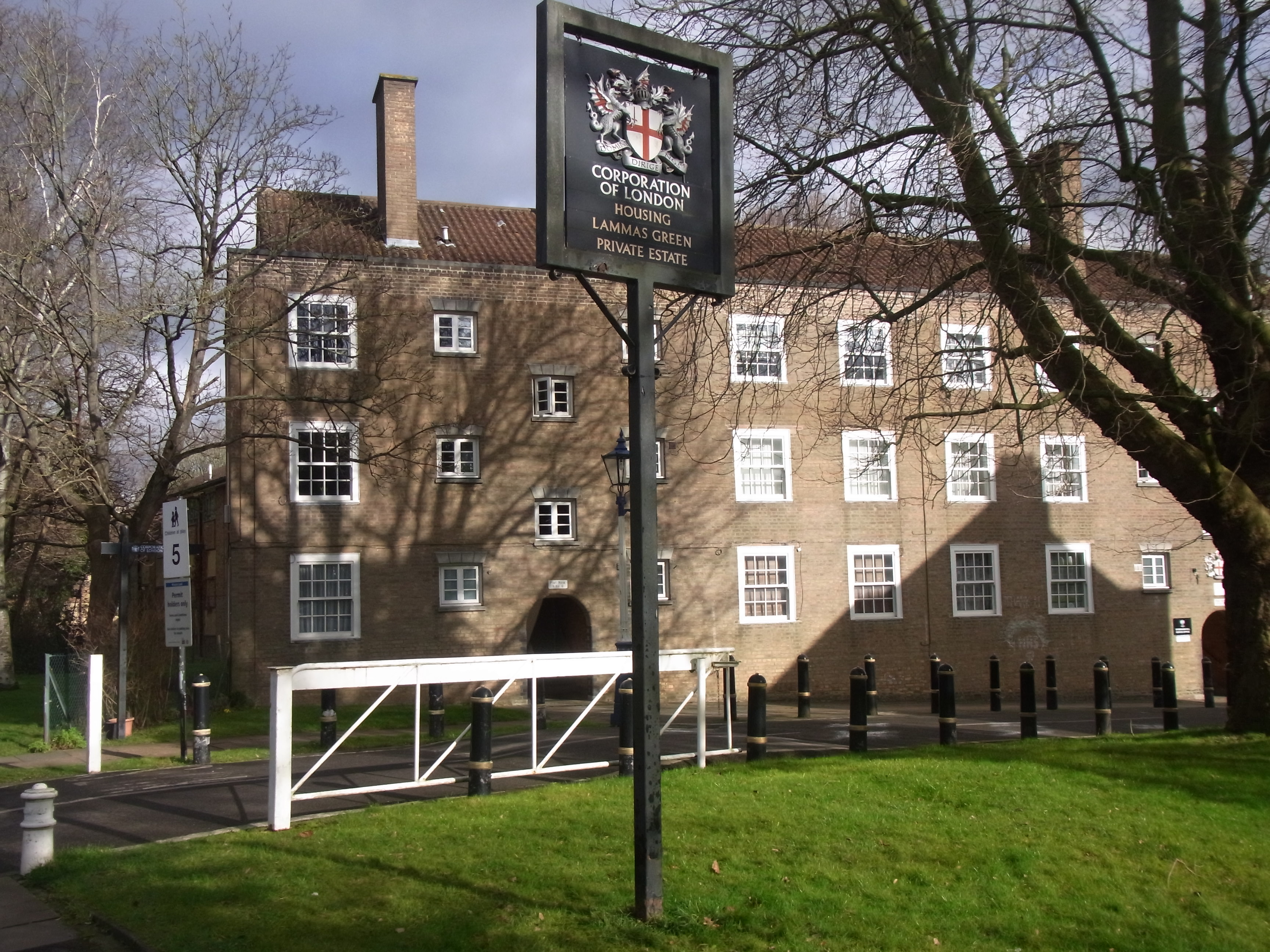
Lammas Green Estate owned by the Corporation of London in the London Borough of Lewisham

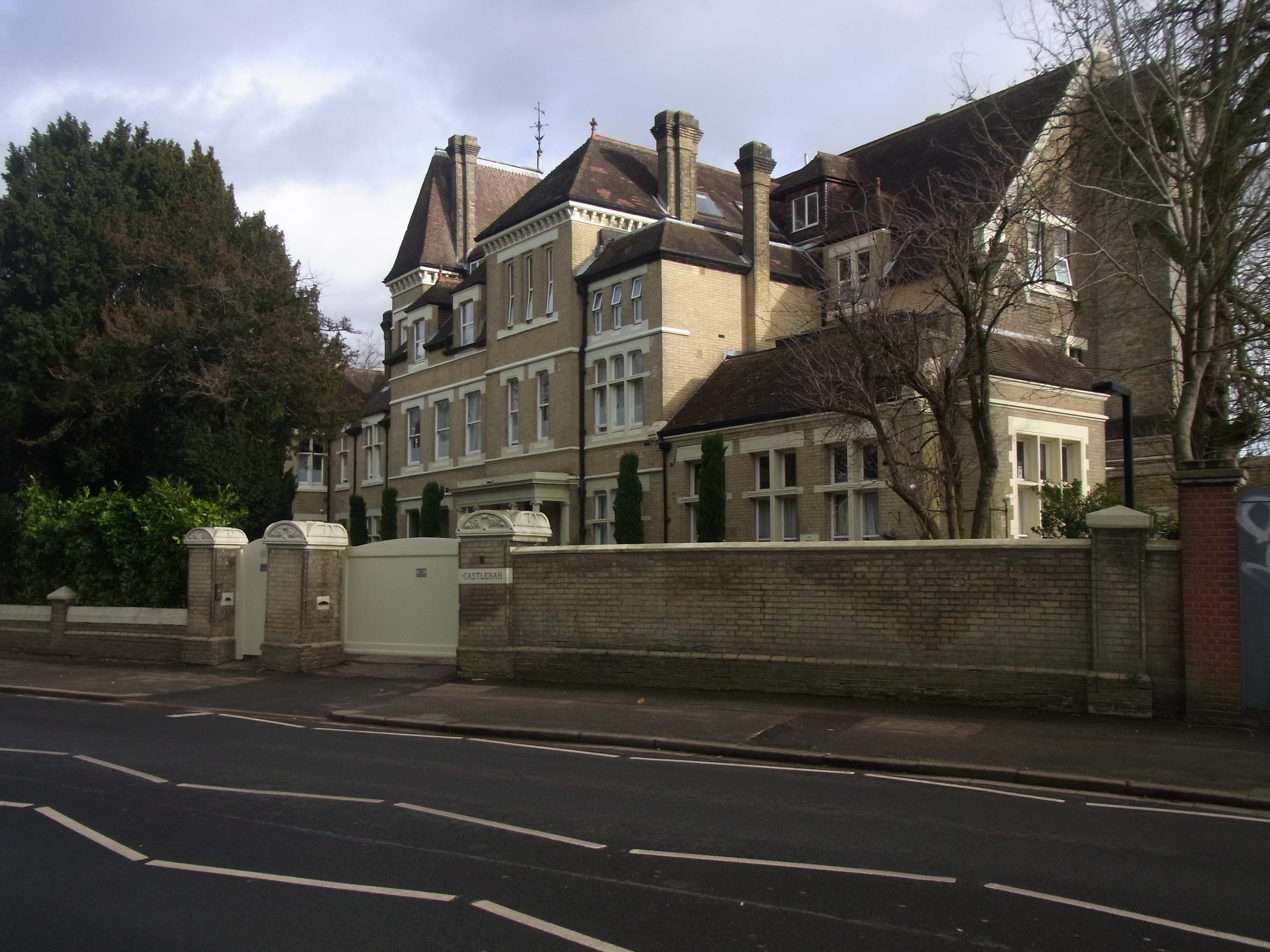
46 Sydenham Hill (Castlebar Care Home, built 1879), London Borough of Lewisham

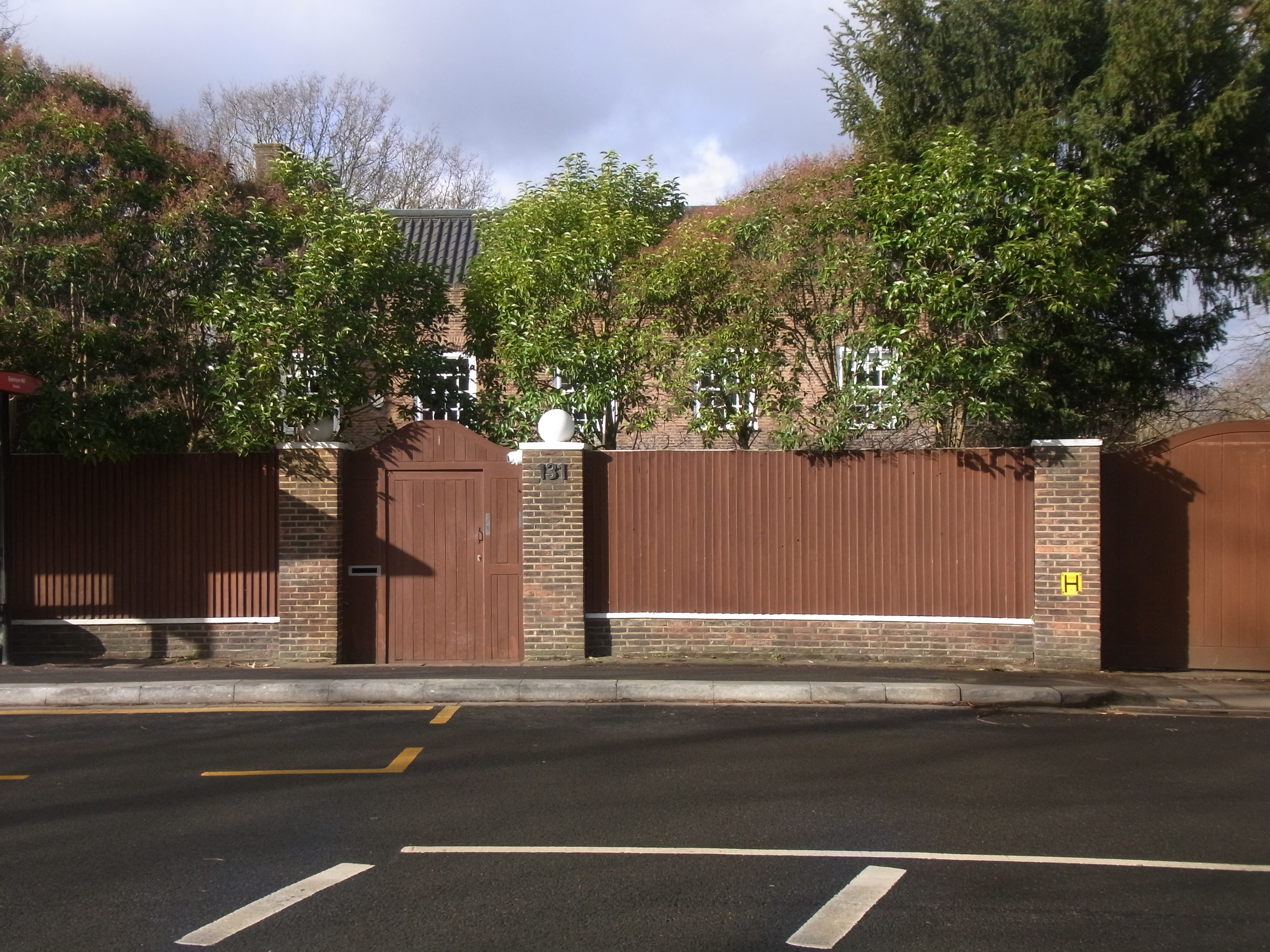
131 Sydenham Hill, London Borough of Lewisham

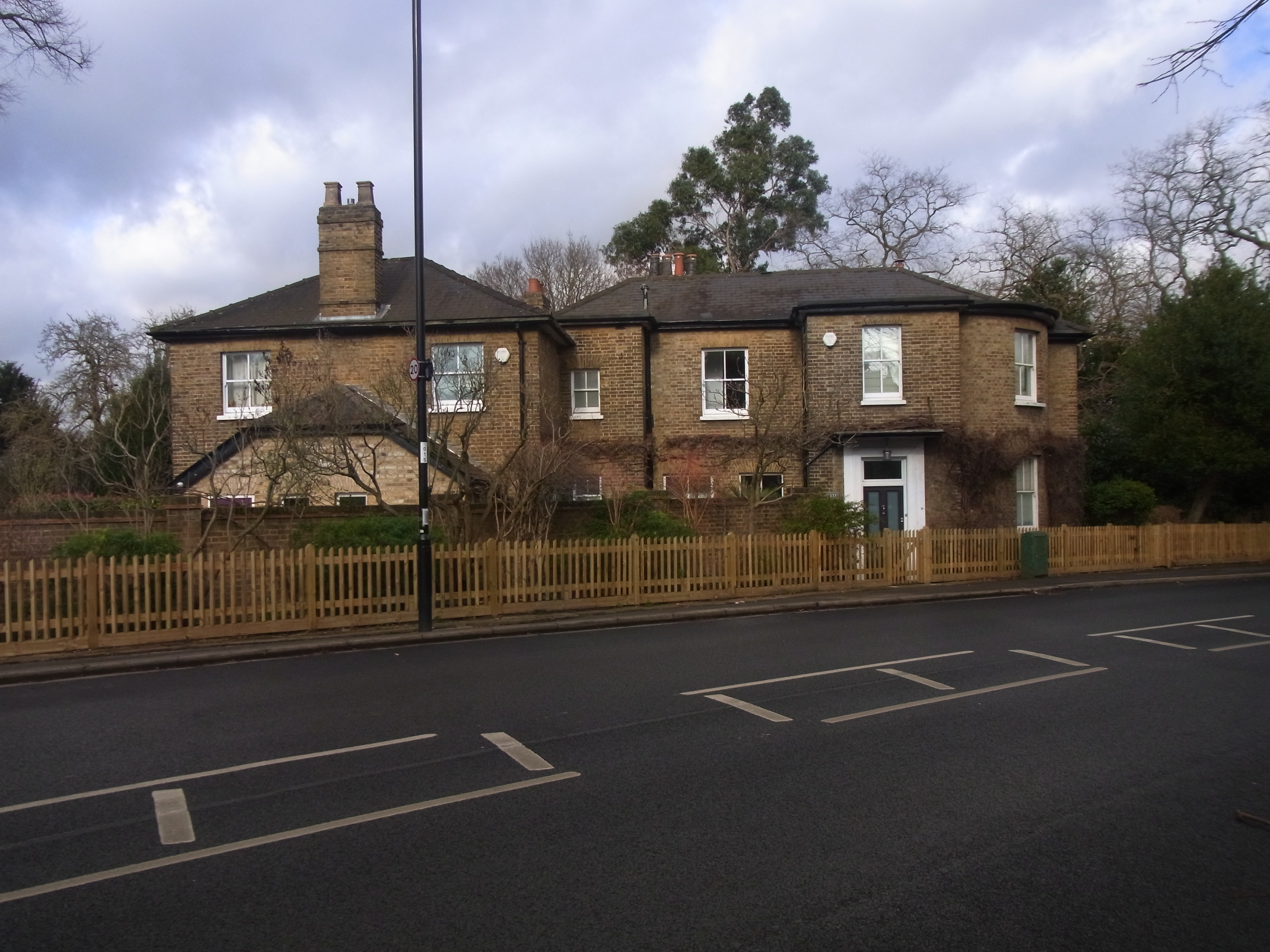
133 Sydenham Hill, London Borough of Lewisham

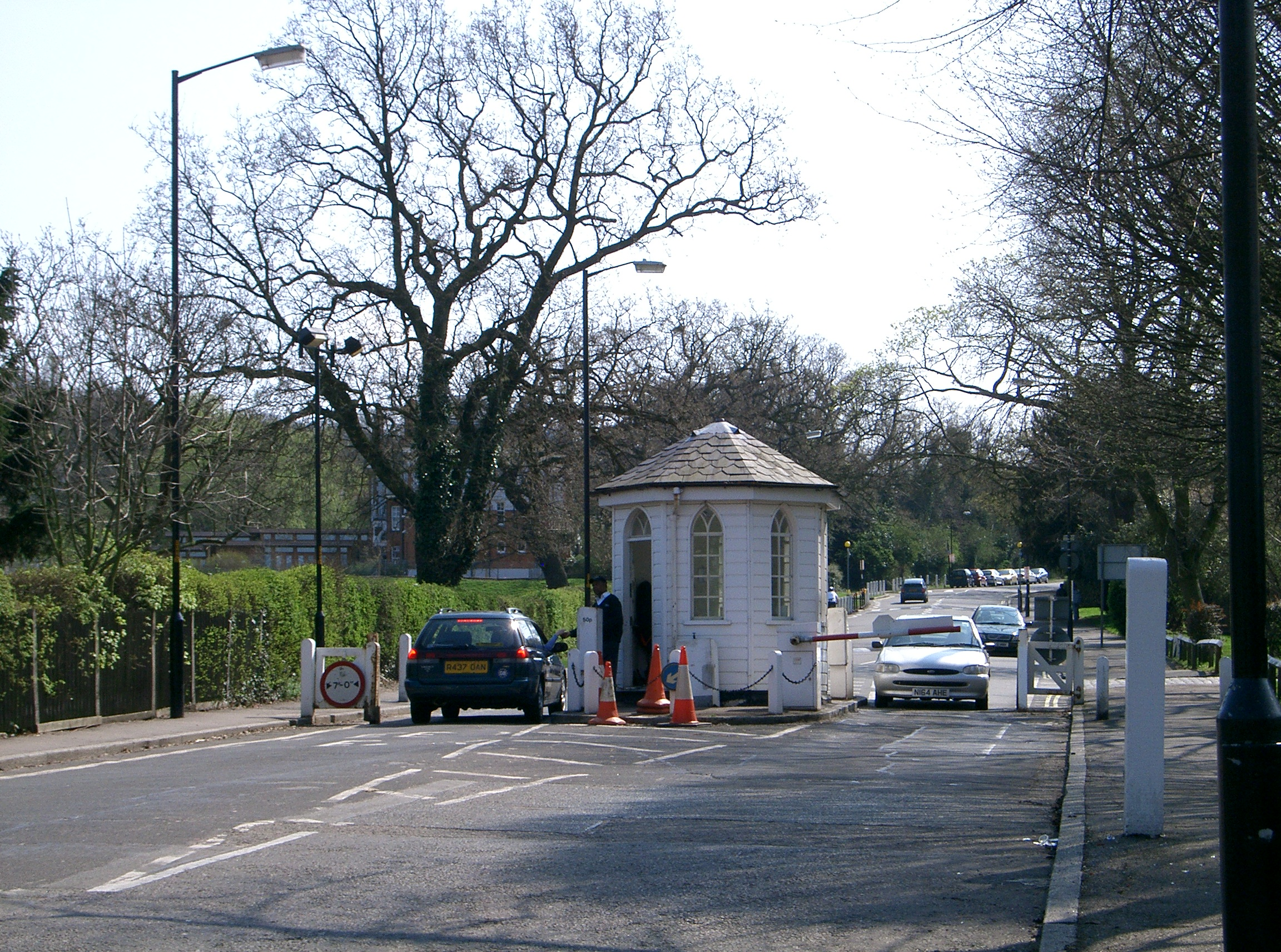
Paying the toll at the College Road, SE21 tollgate, which dates back to 1789

== See also ==
- Sydenham
- Dulwich
- Crystal Palace
