= Joseph Ashby-Sterry =

English poet, novelist and journalist

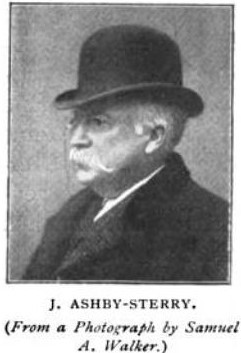
English author Joseph Ashby-Sterry in about 1880

Joseph Ashby-Sterry (1836 or 1838 – 1 June 1917) was an English poet, novelist and journalist born in London. He contributed to Punch.

== Life ==
Ashby-Sterry was born in London, as the only son of Henry Sterry of Sydenham Hill. His works include Boudoir Ballads, a collection of poetry. He did not marry. He died on 1 June 1917, leaving £12,039.

== Journalism ==
Ashby-Sterry was a contributor to the British magazine Punch. He also wrote the "Bystander" column in a British weekly paper, The Graphic, for 18 years.

== Select bibliography ==
- Katharine and Petruchio, or, The Shaming of the True. London, S. Rivers, 1870
- The Shuttlecock Papers. A book for an idle hour. London, Tinsley Bros., 1873
- Tiny Travels. London, Tinsley, 1874
- Boudoir Ballads. London, Chatto and Windus, 1876
- The Wooden Midshipman. London, 1881
- A Snailway Guide to Tunbridge Wells. Tunbridge Wells, R. Clements, 1884
- The Lazy Minstrel. London, T. Fisher Unwin, 1886
- Cucumber Chronicles; a book to be taken in slices. London, Sampson Low & Co., 1887
- Charles Dickens in Southwark. London, 1888
- Nutshell Novels. London, Hutchinson & Co., 1891
- A Naughty Girl; a story of 1893. London, Bliss, Sands & Foster, 1893
- A Tale of the Thames, etc. London, Bliss Sands, 1896
- The Bystander; or Leaves for the Lazy. London, Sands & Co., 1901
- The River Rhymer. London, W.J. Ham-Smith, 1913

== Sources ==
- Moruzi, Kristina (2016). Constructing Girlhood through the Periodical Press, 1850-1915. Accessed 15 July 2020. London: Routledge, ISBN 9781317161509
