= External wall insulation =

Energy conservation measure for buildings

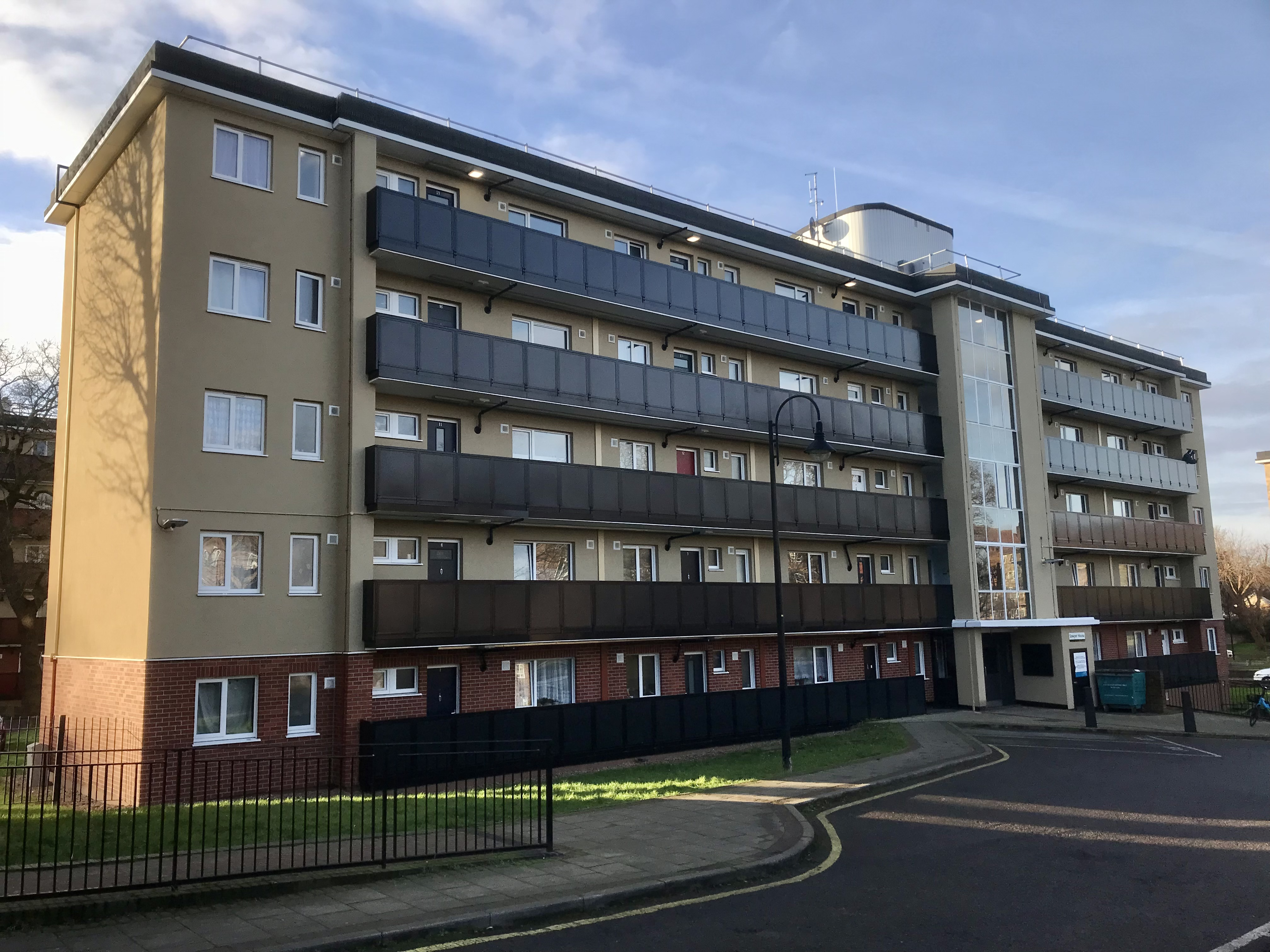
- Example of EWIS on a block of flats in Kingswood Estate, incorporating a silicone render and brick slips
- Synonyms: EWI, EWIS
- Material type: Cladding

An external wall insulation system (or EWIS) is a thermally insulated, protective, and decorative exterior cladding procedure involving the use of expanded polystyrene, mineral wool, polyurethane foam or phenolic foam, topped off with a reinforced cement based, mineral or synthetic finish and plaster.

The thickness of thermal insulation is dependent on whatever type is required in order to create a partition with a heat transmission factor of U=0.25-0.3 W/m2K. When calculating the actual insulation requirements, consideration must be given to current Building Regulation standards. Consideration must also be given to exposure and durability, and whether the structure might be subjected to vandalism etc. In many older properties, special attention is required for concrete beams or lintels which act as thermal bridges providing poor insulation.

== Types ==
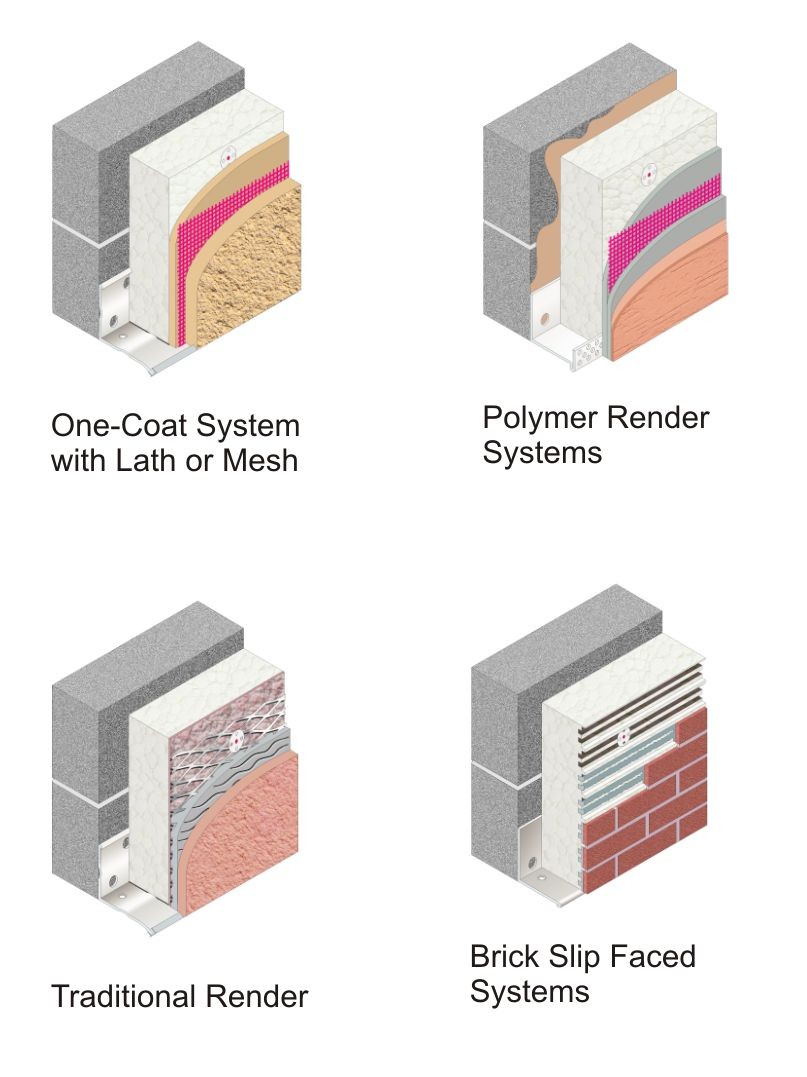
Types of External cromatic wall insulation systems (EWI Systems pictured above)

External wall insulation systems generally comprise firstly an insulation layer (an element which helps to achieve the requisite thermal performance); and secondly, a protected weatherproof finish (usually a render, although brick slips, tiles, and decorative boards can also be used). Insulating render can also be an advantage in certain locations. Choice of types and sizes will depend on the substrate and design exposure requirements.

Dry finishes are usually fixed to the substrate by means of timber battens independently fixed to the substrate.

Any system selected and installed, should be certified by a notified body.

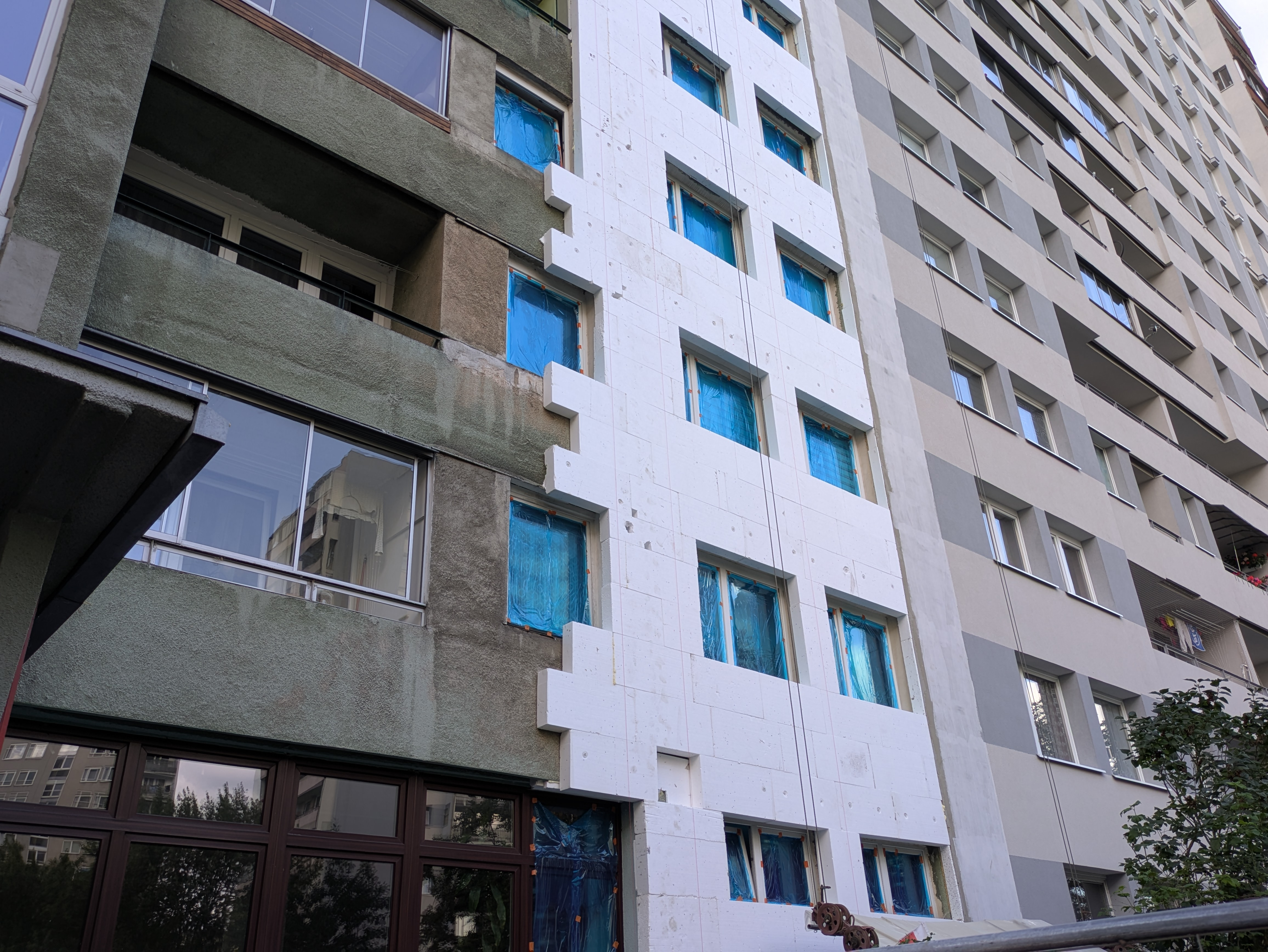
External rigid polystyrene foam insulation being installed on a building in Warsaw, Poland.

=== Traditional finishes ===
A selection of traditional finishes is currently utilised within the external wall insulation industry. Dry-dash render is a traditional render application commonly used. By this method, dry dashing aggregate is thrown onto the wet render to create a natural aggregate finish. Available in a wide variety of colours, sizes and textures, the practice is relatively cheap. Manufactured aggregates such as ceramics and glass can be used for more specialised projects, but the costs will be greater than for projects using natural aggregates.

Scratch plaster render is a coloured cementitious render scratched while the surface is still workable, but after the initial setting has taken place. The surface of the render is removed by the action of the scratching tool, and approximately 2 to 3 millimetres (0.079 to 0.118 in) of render are removed exposing the open matrix of the aggregate mix. The true colour of the render is exposed with a light even texture.

Roughcast render consists of a top-coat render and aggregate mix thrown onto a backing coat in a slurry form, the aggregate being totally encapsulated within the cementitious slurry. The aggregate may be any hard stone of an equal graded size to suit the particular application and creates a “lumpy texture” finish. This method is traditionally widely used in Scotland.

An innovation is the inclusion of silicone water-proofers in pre-blended and pre-packed proprietary renders. This development increases the specification and capabilities of polymer renders, particularly for exposed or coastal areas. It is applied in the conventional manner and is now readily available in all the usual colours.

Tyrolean finishes are sprayed cementitious mixes, pre-coloured and applied by a hand-held machine. This finish is widely used throughout the UK as an economical, easily applied colourful finish for all forms of building type. It has medium-term durability under average conditions.

Smooth/painted finishes consist of masonry paint, and are applied to a good rendered surface to give a smooth coloured effect, free of the imperfections that the more natural aggregate finishes can sometimes deliver. A very wide selection of light colours are available.

Textured coatings are applied by roller or trowel to an approximate thickness of 1.5 to 3 millimetres (0.059 to 0.118 in), and are usually acrylic or silicone-based for waterproofing and long term durability. They produce an even, flat-textured, finish.

Acrylic variants are easily applied, and are considered “high performance” finishes. Some cheaper variants might result in the loss opacity of surface brightness over a relatively short life span. High quality acrylics can provide a longer term durability, colour stability, and crack resistance compared to polymer cement finishes. Acrylic variants are available in a very wide range of colours.

Silicone variants are more resistant to marine environments than acrylics, as they have superior water resistance, but they can be more costly, and come in a smaller range of colours.

Brick slips are a thin facing applied over an insulant to provide a traditional “brick” wall finish. Slips can either be manufactured by extrusion or cut from real bricks.

Brick slips cut from real clay bricks boast the advantage of looking exactly like a brick wall when installed. Real brick slips cut from reclaimed bricks, when used with external cladding systems are used significantly in restoration and renovation works where the brick is no longer available to buy new. Brick slips can also be laid in various patterns, these are known in the industry as bond patterns.

Specialist waterproof coloured pointing mortars are used to complete the effect. Commercially available brick slip systems have been developed to include support for the brick slip finish, certified by BBA/BRE. The brick slips usually have a size of about 210-240 x 50-71 x 20 mm (length x height x width).

Simulated brick renders can also be replicated in coloured polymer to a high standard. Two coloured layers of polymer-modified external cementitious render are applied in 3 to 4 millimetres (0.12 to 0.16 in) layers onto a coloured backing. The “brick” pattern is cut into the top layer, exposing an under-layer of differing colour representing the cement joints.

Simulated stone renders are made from coloured polymer. Two coloured layers of polymer-modified external cementitious render are applied in 3 to 4 millimetres (0.12 to 0.16 in) layers onto a specified backing. The “stone” pattern is cut into the top layer exposing an under-layer of differing colour to represent the cement joints.

Terracotta tiles are usually of clay burnt material imported from Europe. These proprietary systems are secured by a system of extruded aluminium rail systems fixed securely to the substrate with insulation material inserted within the void. Special pressed metal profiles and cills are added to make them waterproof.

Timber boards, aluminium or PVC “sidings” can be installed over insulation to provide additional alternatives to the traditional render and applied finishes. The boards are usually of shiplap profile, and either cedar or treated softwood. Aluminium or PVC systems are also available as alternatives.

Traditional tile hanging finishes can be applied onto conventional timber support structures and insulated with the required type and thickness of insulation. Suitable consideration has to be given to ventilation passages to avoid interstitial condensation.

== Reducing carbon emissions ==
With the UK aiming to reduce its carbon emissions by 80% by the year 2050, the British government has offered up to £6,000 cashback to homeowners who install EWI at their solid wall property. South Wales, where the housing stock is in particular need of being updated to become energy efficient, has seen a surge in applications for this scheme.

External wall insulation is a confirmed way to reduce energy usage needed to heat up the building. Installing it is a part of and eco home or carbon neutral home idea.

== Product requirements ==
Particular product requirements need to be met such as the external wall insulation product reaching a particular u-value in order to make the building sufficiently thermally insulated and therefore be used for a green deal project.

== Dampness ==
The application of External Wall Insulation can help to deal with rain penetration problems through solid walls by blocking wind-driven rain. However, it can also make the problem worse if poor detailing (e.g. around eaves) allows water to pass behind the external wall insulation where it can become trapped. A high standard of design and installation should therefore be insisted upon. The dangers of not adequately designing and specifying these systems is dealt with in a research paper written by Joe Malone and published in the CIOB's Construction, Research and Innovation Journal (Volume 4, Issue 4, Dec 2013 The Risky Business of Covering Up)

External Wall Insulation should only be applied to walls that do not suffer from pre-existing dampness problems. The Energy Saving Trust give the following advice.

"The main damp issue to be avoided with external wall insulation is rising damp. If you already have a problem with this, then it will have to be fixed before the insulation is fitted, otherwise you run the risk of trapping the damp inside the wall structure and so making the problem worse."

== See also ==
- Exterior insulation finishing system
- Building insulation
- Building insulation materials
- Thermal insulation
