= Sydenham Hill railway station =

National Rail station in London, England

Sydenham Hill
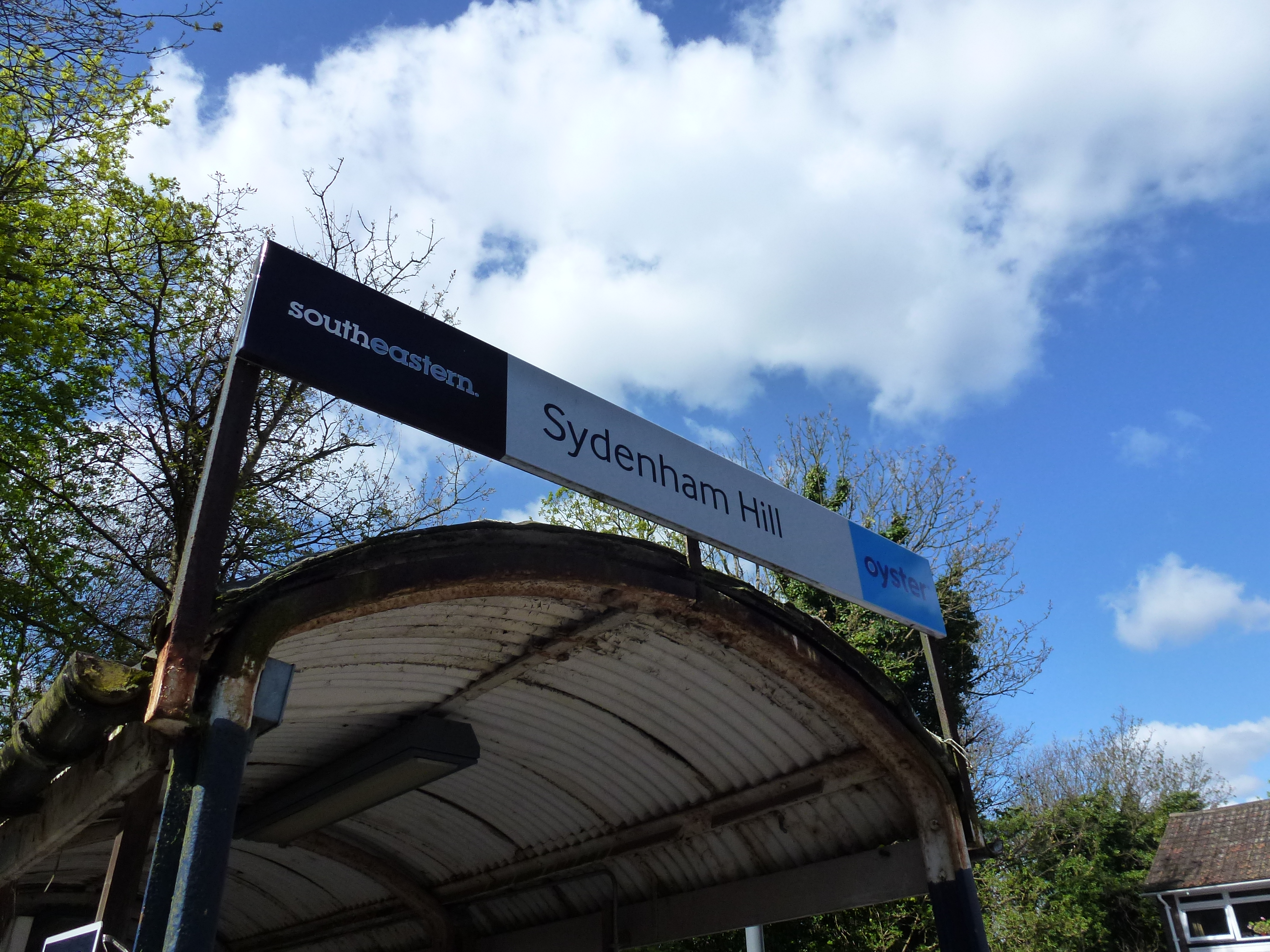
- College Road entrance signage
- Interactive map of Sydenham Hill

General information
- Location: Dulwich Wood, Crystal Palace
- Local authority: London Borough of Southwark
- Managed by: Southeastern
- Station code: SYH
- DfT category: E
- Number of platforms: 2
- Fare zone: 3

National Rail annual entry and exit
- 2020–21: ▼0.209 million
- 2021–22: ▲0.486 million
- 2022–23: ▲0.542 million
- 2023–24: ▲0.676 million
- 2024–25: ▲0.694 million

Key dates
- August 1863: Opened

Other information
- External links: Departures; Facilities
- Coordinates: 51.4326°N 0.0802°W

Sydenham Hill railway station is on the Chatham Main Line in England, serving Sydenham Hill, the Kingswood Estate, and Upper Sydenham, in south London. It is 5 miles 57 chains (9.2 km) down the line from London Victoria and is situated between West Dulwich and Penge East. The station and all trains that call are operated by Southeastern, as part of the Bromley South Metro service. Sydenham Hill is in London fare zone 3.

The station is at the north-western portal of the Sydenham Hill Tunnel, located in a deep cutting with access to all platforms (and the station itself) via steps. Originally the station was known as Sydenham Hill (for Crystal Palace), due to its proximity to the Crystal Palace, until 1936 when the palace was destroyed by fire.

== Services ==
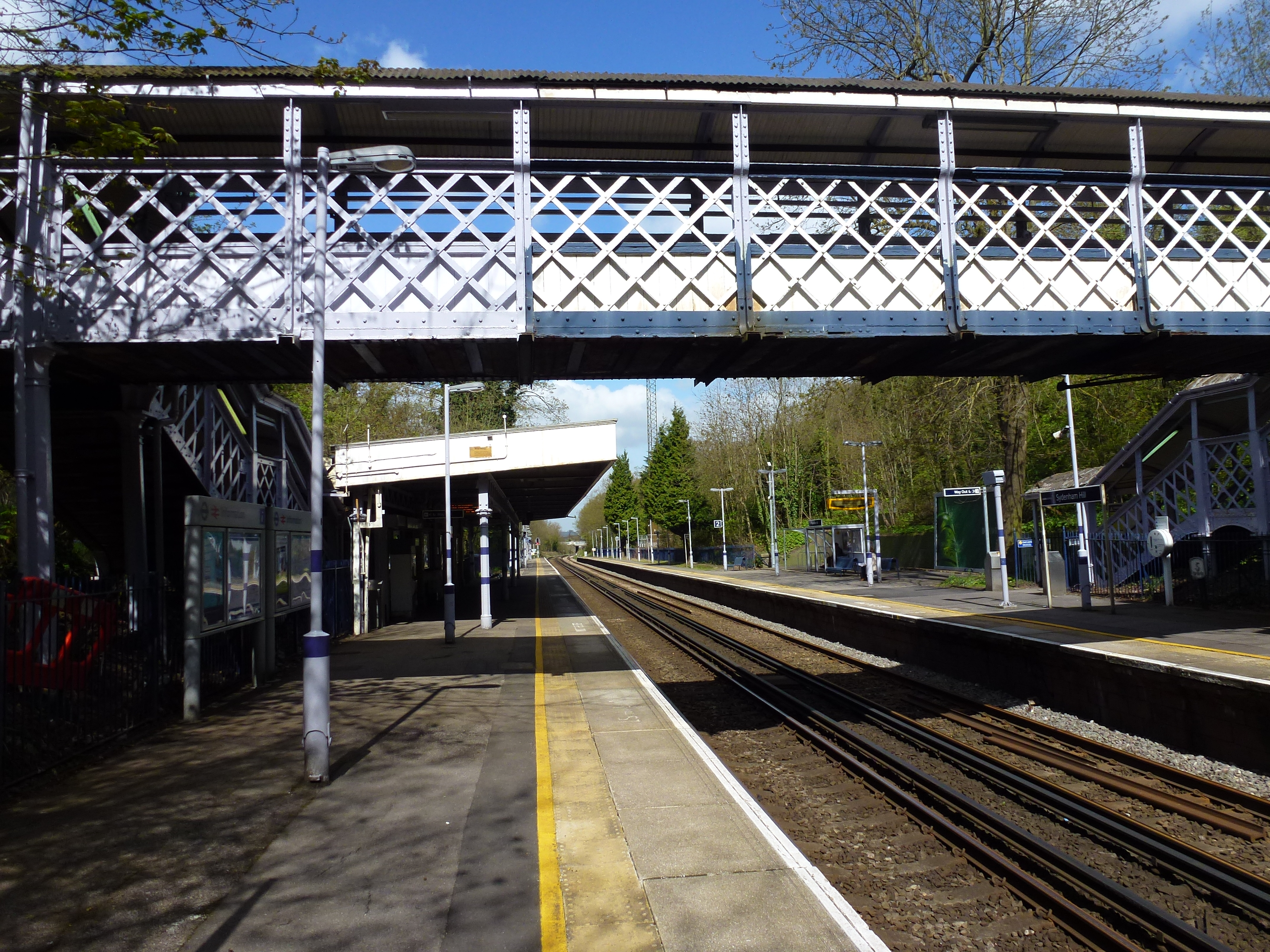
Sydenham Hill platforms looking towards London Victoria

All services at Sydenham Hill are operated by Southeastern using Class 465 and 466 EMUs.

The typical off-peak service in trains per hour is:

- 4 tph to London Victoria via Herne Hill
- 4 tph to Orpington via Bromley South

Additional services, including trains between Beckenham Junction and London Blackfriars call at the station during the peak hours.

On weekends, the service is reduced to 2 trains per hour in each direction.

Preceding station	National Rail	Following station
West Dulwich	Southeastern Bromley South Line	Penge East
