= William Vizard =

English lawyer (1774–1859)

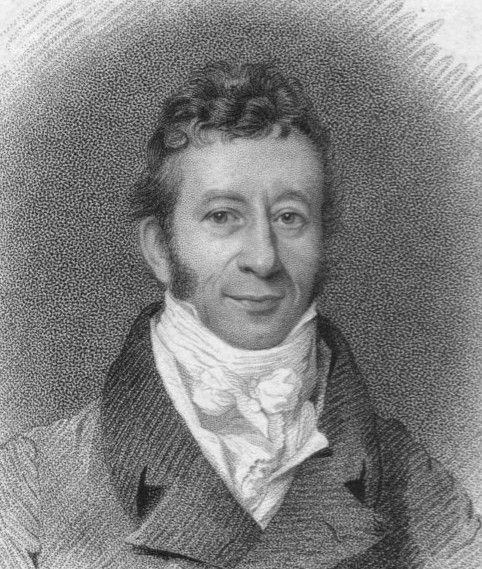
- Portrait of Vizard from an engraving by Thomas Wright, c. 1820
- Born: 1774; Dursley, Gloucestershire, Kingdom of Great Britain
- Died: January 15, 1859 (aged 84–85); Little Faringdon, Oxfordshire, United Kingdom of Great Britain and Ireland
- Era: Georgian era
- Political party: Whigs
- Movement: Whiggism
- Parents: William Vizard (father); Ann Phelps (mother)

William Vizard (1774–1859) was an English lawyer, known for his role in the 1820 trial of Queen Caroline.

== Life ==
He was born in Dursley, Gloucestershire, the son of William Vizard (died 1807), a solicitor there, and his wife, Ann Phelps. He went to London in 1790 and worked for his articles under Thomas Lewis of Gray's Inn Square, an attorney of the Court of Exchequer.

In 1797 Vizard went in practice on his own account as a solicitor in Holborn Square. This office became a law firm that was the ancestor of Vizard Oldham Brooke Blain (Vizards). After further corporate changes, it became part of Veale Wasbrough Vizards LLP, trading as VWV. For a period the firm traded as Vizard & Lemans of Lincoln's Inn Fields, where Vizard was in partnership with James Leman (1793–1876), Henry Leman and William Leman.

Through Thomas Creevey, Vizard encountered Whig politicians. He worked with Henry Brougham to have the Orders in Council (1807) repealed, on behalf of a group of merchants of Liverpool and Manchester, from 1807 to 1812.

From around 1812, Vizard became active in Whig politics, initially as an unsuccessful candidate at Bristol in the 1812 general election. It was at this period that he was appointed solicitor to Caroline, Princess of Wales, at Brougham's suggestion. She was largely absent from the United Kingdom, from 1814.

When George IV came to the throne in 1820, he attempted to impose "pain and penalties" on his wife Queen Caroline, by means of a bill in the House of Lords to dissolve their marriage. Vizard defended the Queen, by organising opposition to the bill's second reading. This took place from August to November 1820. The defence was successful, and Vizard announced the bill's withdrawal from the balcony of the House of Lords.

In later years, Vizard was a legal reformer, proposing changes in the 1820s to the Court of Chancery. When Brougham was Lord Chancellor, from 1830, Vizard worked on his reform of bankruptcy. He died at Little Faringdon on 15 January 1859.
