= Ladywell Leisure Centre =

Sports venue in Lewisham, London, England

Coordinates: 51.4565°N 0.0135°W

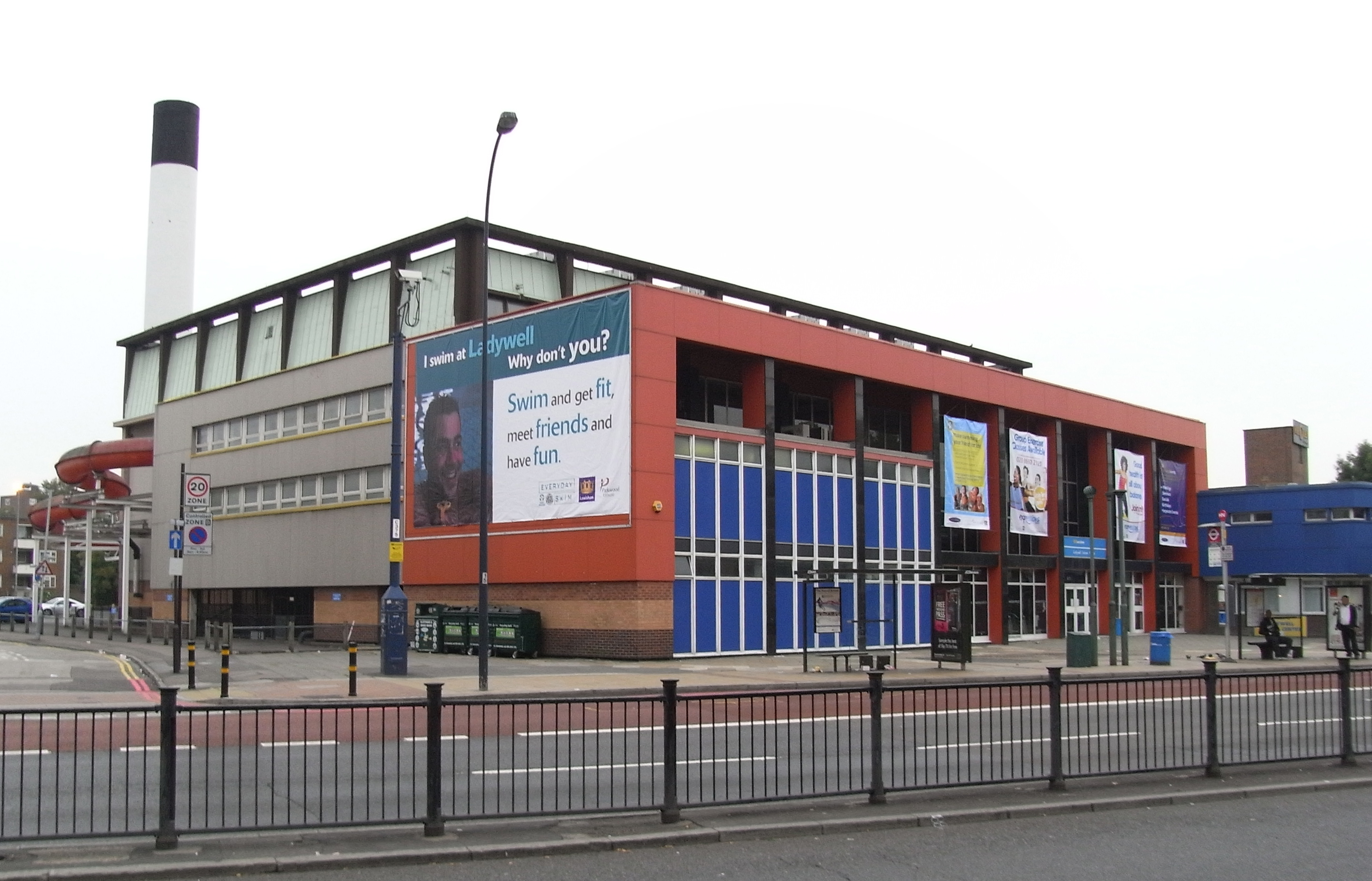
Ladywell Leisure Centre, September 2009

Ladywell Leisure Centre was a leisure centre located in Lewisham, London. The leisure centre was owned by London Borough of Lewisham and managed on their behalf by Lifestyle Fusion. The building was demolished in 2014, as a result of the new Glass Mill Leisure Centre being opened.

The building featured as the main character's workplace in Sean Lock's sitcom 15 Storeys High and also in the film The Long Good Friday as the location of a murder at a swimming pool.

== See also ==
- Forest Hill Pools
