= Walter Cobb =

Walter Cobb may refer to:

- Walter Cobb (department store), a department store in Sydenham, South London
- USS Walter B. Cobb, a high speed transport of the United States Navy
- Walt Cobb, Canadian politician
- Wally Cobb, Australian rugby union player
