= Sydenham School =

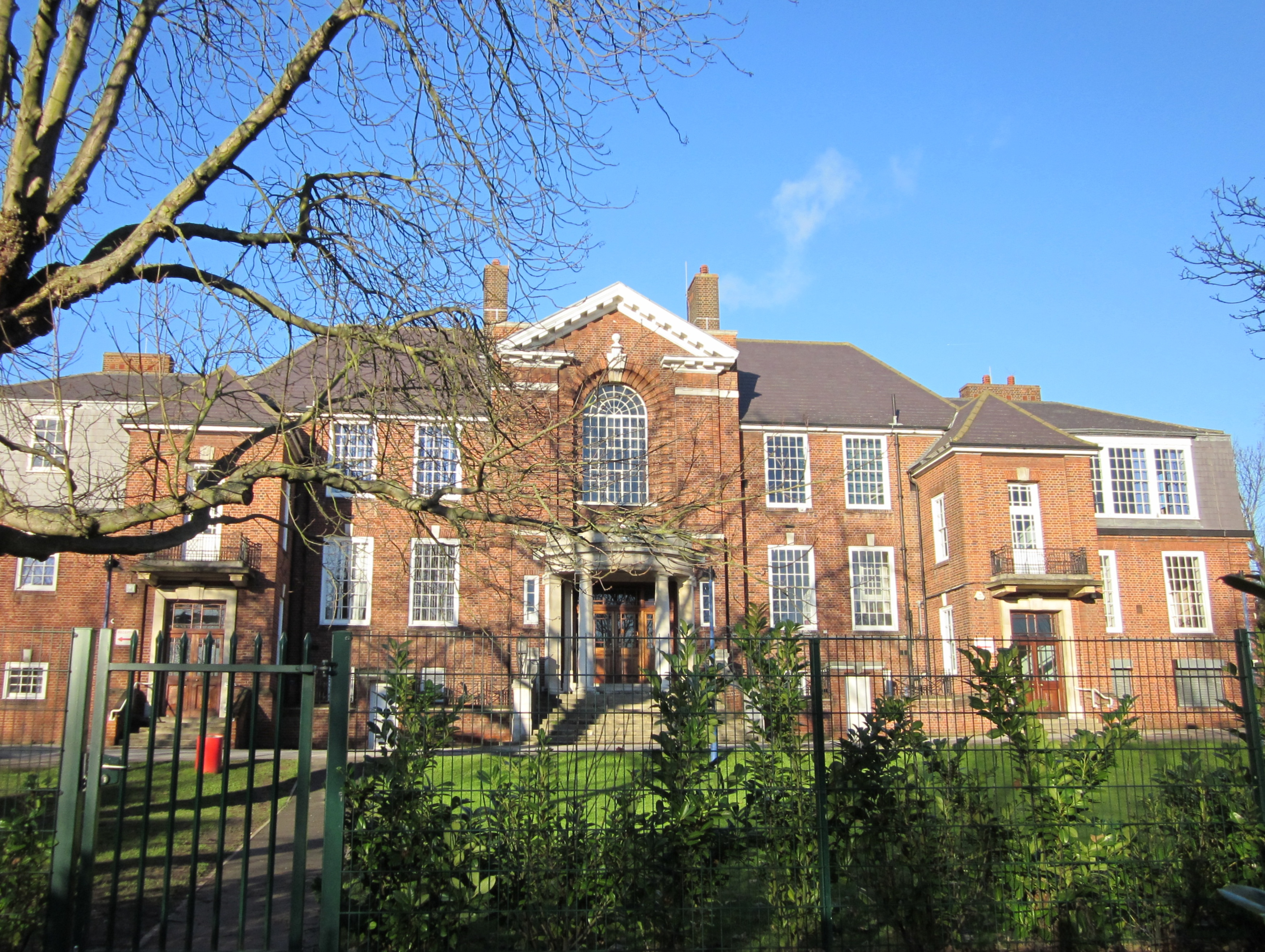

Location
- Dartmouth Road; Sydenham, Greater London, SE26 4RD; England; 51.434167°N 0.058889°W

Information
- Type: Community School
- Motto: Aim high, Achieve Higher.
- Established: 1917
- Local authority: Lewisham
- Department for Education URN: 100741 Tables
- Ofsted: Reports
- Headteacher: Emma Wijnberg
- Gender: Girls
- Age: 11 to 18
- Enrolment: 4 (capacity 7.8)
- Colour: Blue
- Website: http://www.sydenham.lewisham.sch.uk

Sydenham School is a comprehensive girls' school located on Dartmouth Road (A2216) in Sydenham, London.

== History ==
The school was founded in 1917 as a girls' grammar school, known as Sydenham County Grammar School for Girls. London County Council commissioned Basil Spence & Partners, in the early 1950s, to design additional accommodation to allow the school to increase capacity from 600 to 1140 students and to merge with Shackleton School to become a comprehensive school. This took place in 1956 on completion of the new six-storey, E-shaped, classroom block, on which work had begun in 1954. The official opening ceremony took place on 28 February 1957.

In 2003 Sydenham School was granted Specialist Science College status and in 2008 it was granted Specialist in Mathematics by the DfES. Sydenham School has close ties to Forest Hill School, a nearby boys' comprehensive school.

== Form system ==
In each year there are 8 tutor groups, named for the letters in SYDENHAM.

== Admissions ==
The current headmistress is Ms Emma Wijnberg. It has always been a girls' school. Forest Hill Pools and Forest Hill library is next door.

== Academic performance ==
In the last OFSTED inspection, Sydenham School was graded as 'good with outstanding features '. It gets GCSEs and A levels above the England average.(64%)

== Notable former pupils ==
- Katie Brayben, Olivier Award Winner 2015 and 2023 Best Actress in a Musical.
- Sarah Jane Crawford, television and radio presenter.
- Tasha Danvers, 400 metre hurdler, bronze in the Beijing 2008 Olympics.
- Mia Goth, actress
- Khadijah Dare, Islamic State of Iraq and the Levant member

=== Sydenham County Grammar School for Girls ===
- Eva Crane, researcher into bees
- Linda Ludgrove, swimmer
- Elsie Widdowson, dietitian

== See also ==
- Sydenham High School (UK), nearby girls independent school for ages 4–18, and part of the Girls' Day School Trust (GPSDT)
- Forest Hill School, partnered school for boys 11-18
