= Sydenham Hill Wood =

Nature reserve in Southwark, London

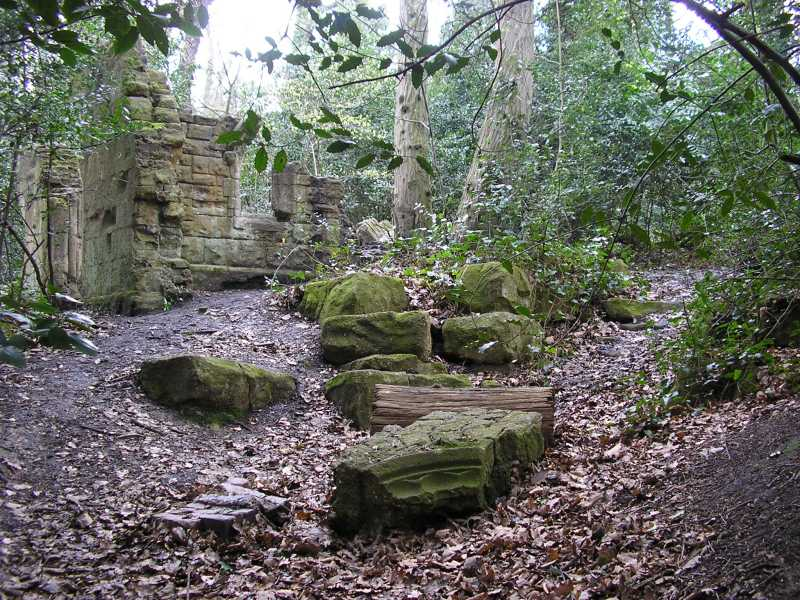
- The folly, a rockery and the path of a former ornamental stream.
- Interactive map of Sydenham Hill Wood
- Type: Woodland
- Location: Sydenham Hill, Sydenham, London
- Coordinates: 51.436°N 0.067°W
- Operator: Dulwich Estate; London Borough of Southwark
- Public transit: Sydenham Hill railway station

Sydenham Hill Wood is a ten-hectare wood on the northern slopes of the Norwood Ridge in the London Borough of Southwark. It is designated as a Local Nature Reserve and Site of Metropolitan Importance for Nature Conservation. With the adjacent Dulwich Wood, Sydenham Hill Wood is the largest extant tract of the ancient Great North Wood. The two woods are formed from coppices known as Lapsewood, Old Ambrook Hill Wood and Peckarmans Wood after the relocation of The Crystal Palace in 1854 and the creation of the high level line in 1865.

The land is owned by the Dulwich Estate, leased to Southwark Council, who lease Sydenham Hill Wood to London Wildlife Trust. Sydenham Hill Wood and Fern Bank are a Local Nature Reserve.

In 1997 Sydenham Hill Wood was given the UK-MAB Urban Wildlife Award for Excellence. There are conservation workdays and wildlife events.

== History ==
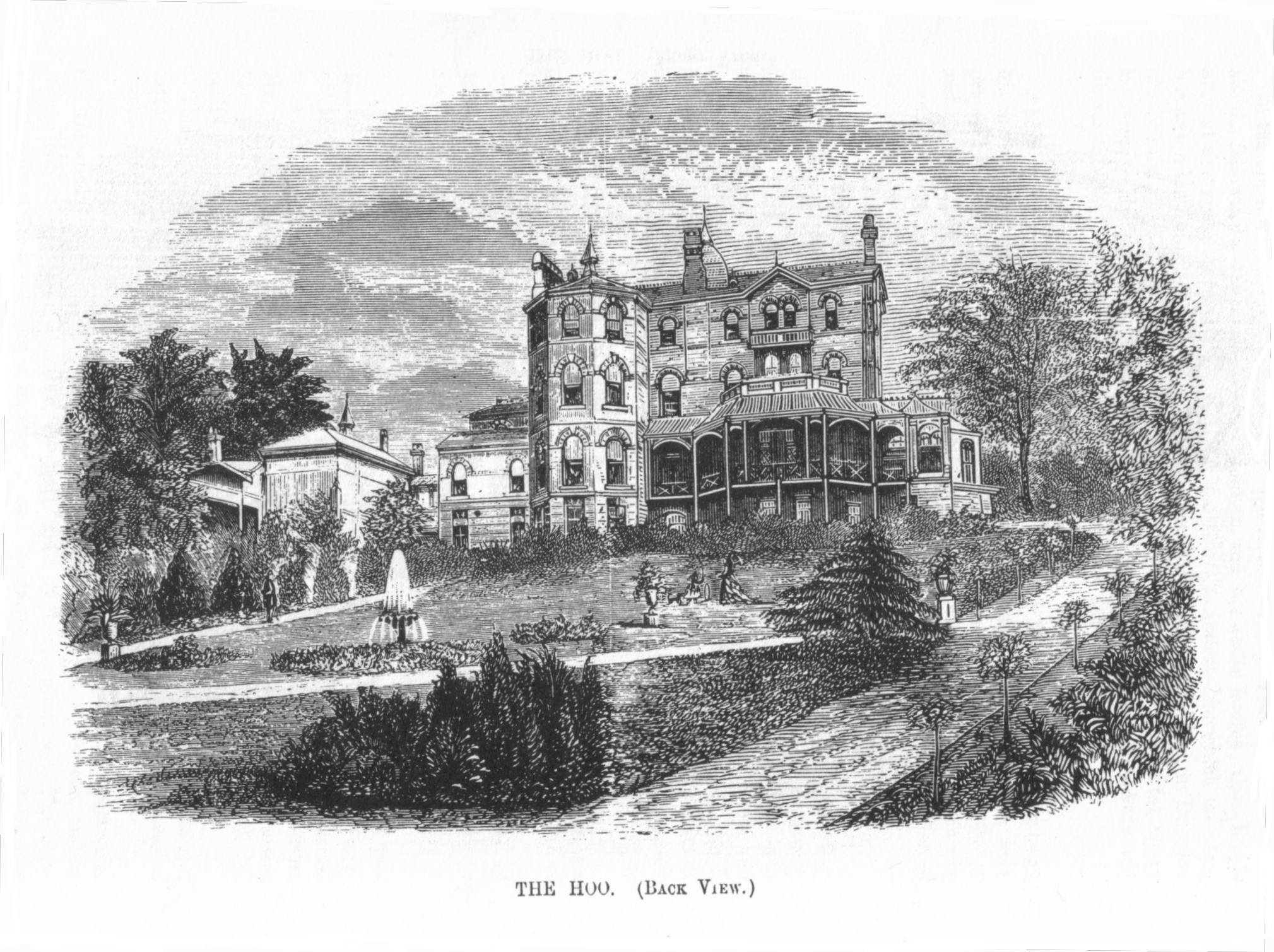
A rear view of The Hoo

In the sixteenth century, the woods on Sydenham Hill were reserved by Elizabeth I to provide timber for shipbuilding.

The oak-lined formal avenue, known as Cox's Walk, leading from the junction of Dulwich Common and Lordship Lane was cut soon after 1732 by Francis Cox to connect his Green Man Tavern and Dulwich Wells with the more popular Sydenham Wells. When the poet Thomas Campbell lived in Sydenham (between 1805 and 1822) he visited his friend Dr Glennie, in Dulwich Grove. After the relocation of the Crystal Palace in 1854, the Dulwich Estate made plots along Sydenham Hill available on long leases, and a series of large houses was built. Between the junction with Crescent Wood Road and Cox's Walk there were seven houses. One of the largest was The Hoo, standing almost opposite the present 36 Sydenham Hill.

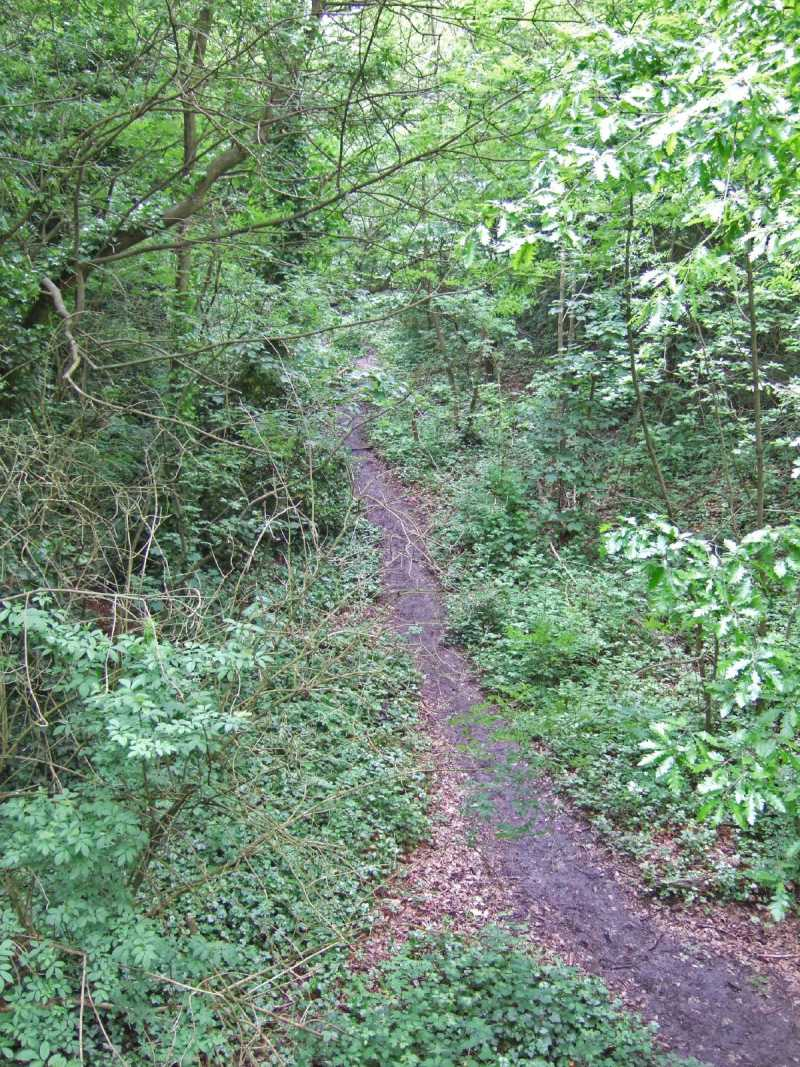
A view of the erstwhile trackbed from the footbridge.

The folly was in the former grounds of Fairwood at 53 Sydenham Hill; the house was first occupied by Alderman David Henry Stone. Stone commissioned James Pulham & Son to build the folly. Incised lines simulating stonework on the folly's arch resemble those on the bridge in Buckingham Palace Gardens. The Pulham catalogue indicates that the firm of James Pulham and Son worked extensively in the Sydenham/Dulwich area in the 1870s. In the grounds in front of Kingswood House, there are remains of features in Pulhamite.

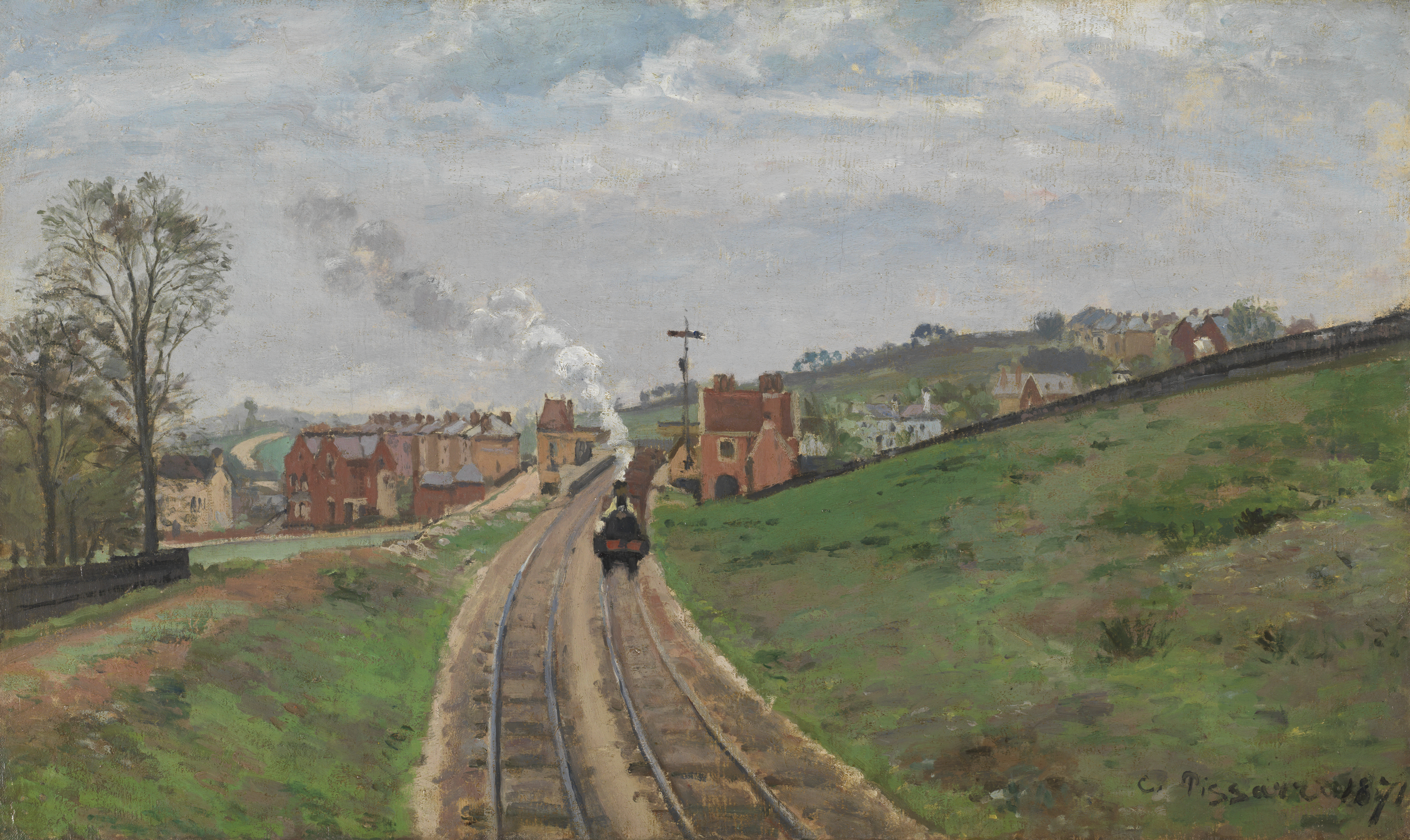
The view towards Lordship Lane railway station, painted by Camille Pissarro in 1871.

The Crystal Palace and South London Junction Railway went through Sydenham Hill Wood, the Dulwich College estate and two tunnels, terminating at the west of the Crystal Palace. It opened on 1 August 1865. In 1871, Camille Pissarro painted the view down the tracks to Lordship Lane from the wood and brick bridge on Cox's Walk. The image, of a train billowing steam, grasps the optimism of the Industrial Revolution. In 1908 the footbridge was renewed in teak and iron to the same design as the original. The fortunes of the railway waned with those of the Crystal Palace, declining after the Crystal Palace burned down in 1936. It closed during the war, and the post-war re-opening was unsuccessful; the last service ran in 1954. The track was lifted in 1956 and the terminus demolished in 1961.

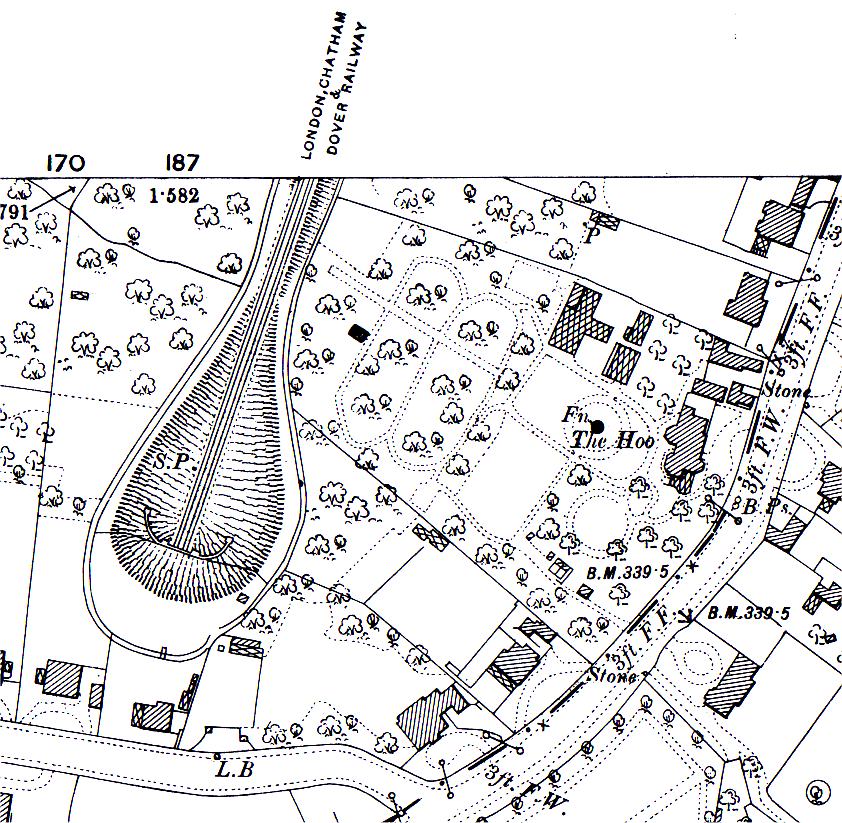
A small part of the Upper Sydenham 1894 Ordnance Survey map, showing buildings and garden paths on the southeast edge of the wood

In 1982, Southwark Council leased the Wood to London Wildlife Trust to manage as a nature reserve. In 1984 Southwark Council's Mid/South Southwark Local Plan included proposals for blocks of up to 146 flats on the top part of the Wood. London Wildlife Trust's Southwark Wildlife Group ran a "Save the Woods" campaign backed by West Lewisham MP John Maples and other local MPs. Dulwich MP Gerald Bowden asked the Secretary of State for the Environment to intervene. A full-page Evening Standard article set the scene for a New Year public inquiry into the Plan. The January inquiry heard evidence from a dozen ecologists on the Wood's wildlife diversity, other witnesses describing the Wood's educational and amenity value, visited the site and listened to views from several hundred members of the public at an evening meeting at Kingswood House. Southwark MP Simon Hughes spoke in favour of saving the wood in the House of Commons. Further, Dulwich College Estates applied for planning permission to build 36 flats on the site of Beechgrove House (former home of Lionel Logue).

In July 1985, the Local Plan inspector reported that most of the Wood should be protected from development. The written report was published in the same week that Southwark Council's planning committee rejected the Beechgrove application. In advance of a public inquiry into the Beechgrove plans held in November 1986, Gerald Bowden MP said: "I’ve never had quite such a wide range of ordinary people writing to me on one subject. There is very broad opposition to the flats." The inspector's decision against the plan was hailed as "Wood reprieve a policy precedent." "The need to preserve areas of existing natural woodland within the urban areas is of as much importance in preserving our heritage and improving the quality of the environment as that of preserving the countryside," the inspector said.

In 1988 there were still many rhododendrons, a lone monkey puzzle, the cedar of Lebanon, fragments of Pulhamite ornaments and the folly. The trackbed was partly built on, but elsewhere it has reverted to nature. Part of the route adjacent to the Horniman Museum and Gardens is now a "Railway Nature Trail", maintained for the museum by the Trust for Urban Ecology. In Sydenham Hill Wood, its path can be followed from the footbridge on Cox's Walk to the entrance of the Crescent Wood tunnel. The tunnel emerges again to the north of Wells Park Road. On the western edge there is a small stream in the woods called the Ambrook, formerly a tributary of the River Effra. From here it flows across the golf course, then alongside Cox's Walk, under Dulwich Common and into the lake in Dulwich Park. In wet weather it rises above the drains and flows along the road around Dulwich Park by Frank Dixon Way.

== Wildlife ==
Now a mix of old woodland, Victorian garden survivors, and recent woodland, it is one of the closest ancient woods to central London and is home to over 200 species of trees and flowering plants. Fungi, rare insects, birds and woodland mammals including the Wood mouse and hedgehog are also present.

Mostly sessile oak-hornbeam woodland, the site includes a wide variety of other tree and shrub species, including numerous exotics planted when the wood included parts of large gardens. The flora includes numerous indicators of long-established woodland; ramsons (Allium ursinum), wood anemone (Anemone nemorosa), wood sorrel and hairy wood-rush (Luzula pilosa). Two British woodpeckers breed, along with nuthatch, treecreeper, tawny owl, kestrel and sparrowhawk, whilst hobby bred in 2015. Invertebrates are well recorded and include the purple hairstreak, white-letter hairstreak and speckled wood butterflies, several nationally scarce bees and wasps, and stag beetles. Fungi are also well recorded and mosses include Mnium punctatum at its only known London locality.

There is one small pond in Sydenham Hill Wood which has been enhanced over the years and is surveyed by volunteers. Common frog and smooth newt are resident, as well as southern hawker dragonfly, common blue and red-tailed damselflies.

Of the bat species using the wood, there are records of common and soprano pipistrelle, noctule, Leisler and brown long-eared bats (the only site in Southwark where these have been recorded).

== Access ==
There is a map and numbered trail from the entrance on Crescent Wood off Sydenham Hill and there is another entrance by the footbridge on Cox's Walk. By public transport the Crescent Wood entrance can be reached by bus 356 from Forest Hill station alighting at the 'Crescent Wood Road' stop. Buses on route 363 from Crystal Palace also pass near the entrance at an adjacent 'Crescent Wood Road' stop. The wood can also be reached from Sydenham Hill railway station.
