= Sydenham, London =

District of south-east London, England

Coordinates: 51.4254°N 0.0544°W

Sydenham
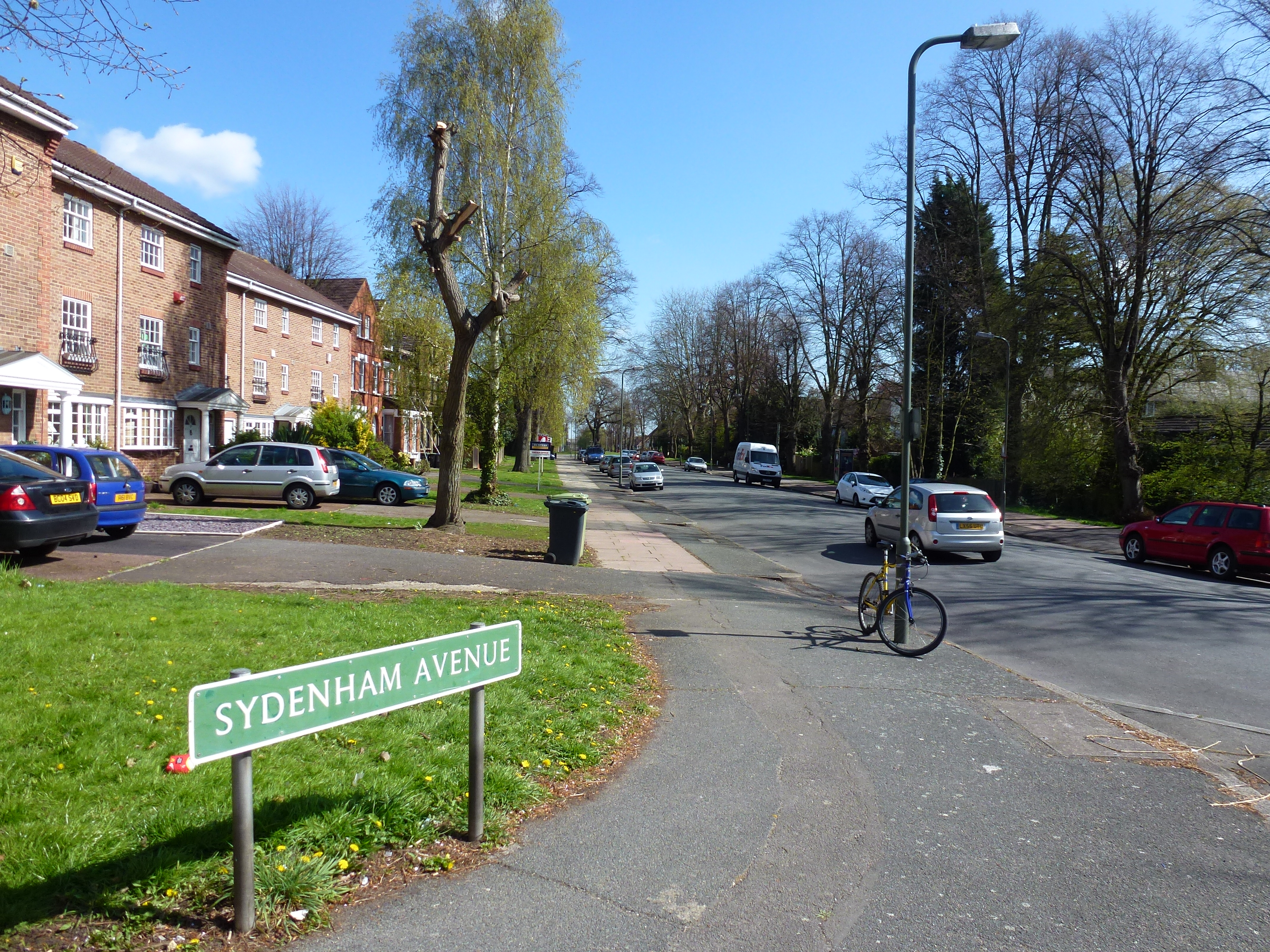
- Sydenham Avenue

- Location within Greater London
- Population: 28,378 (SE26 postcode area)
- OS grid reference: TQ352714
- London borough: Lewisham; Bromley; Southwark
- Ceremonial county: Greater London
- Region: London
- Country: England
- Sovereign state: United Kingdom
- Post town: LONDON
- Postcode district: SE26
- Dialling code: 020
- Police: Metropolitan
- Fire: London
- Ambulance: London
- UK Parliament: Lewisham West and East Dulwich
- London Assembly: Greenwich and Lewisham; Bexley and Bromley; Lambeth and Southwark
- Website: http://sydenham.org.uk/

Sydenham (/ˈsɪdənəm/) is a district of south-east London, England, which is shared between the London boroughs of Lewisham, Bromley and Southwark. Prior to the creation of the County of London in 1889, Sydenham was located in Kent, bordering Surrey. Historically, the area was very affluent, with the Crystal Palace being relocated to Sydenham Hill in 1854. Today, Sydenham is a diverse area, with a population of 28,378 (2011 census) and borders Forest Hill, Dulwich, Crystal Palace, Penge, Beckenham, Catford and Bellingham.

== History ==
A map showing the Sydenham ward of Lewisham Metropolitan Borough as it appeared in 1916.

Originally known as Sippenham, Sydenham began as a small settlement, a few cottages among the woods, whose inhabitants grazed their animals and collected wood. In the 1640s, springs of water in what is now Wells Park were discovered to have medicinal properties, attracting crowds of people to the area. Sydenham grew rapidly in the 19th century after the introduction of the Croydon Canal in 1809 which linked the Grand Surrey Canal to Croydon and a reservoir was constructed in Sydenham. However, the canal was never successful and closed in 1836 resulting in it being the first canal to be abandoned by an Act of Parliament.

The London & Croydon Railway purchased the canal for £40,250 and quickly converted the alignment for a railway from London Bridge to West Croydon, opening in 1839. After the railway opened potential gas companies began to consider the Sydenham area with the Crystal Palace and District Gas Company having works at Bell Green, which continued production until 1969; a retail park now occupies most of the site.

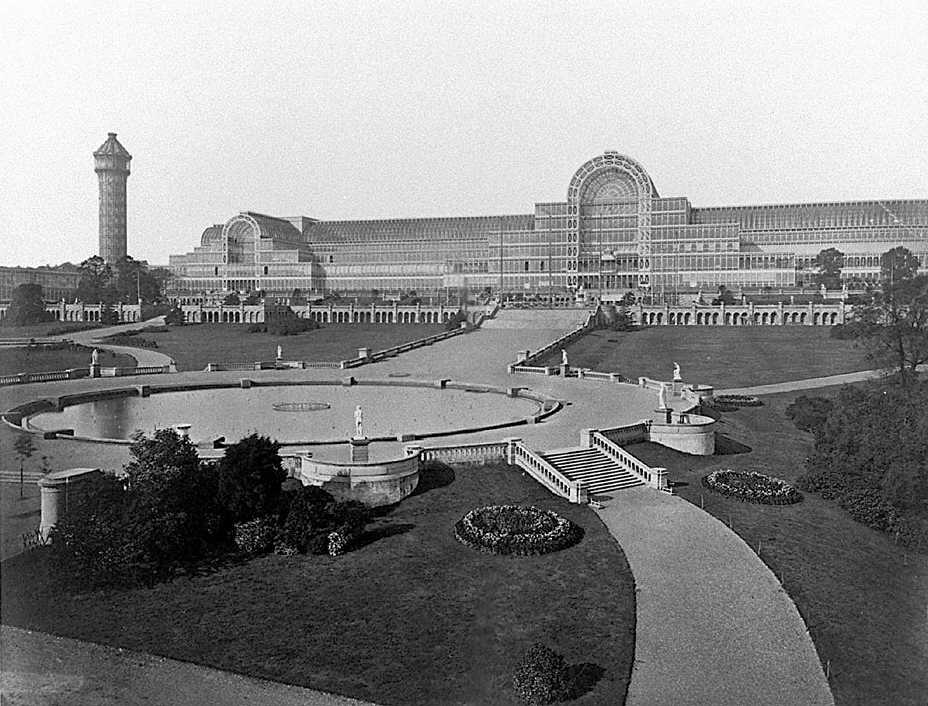
The Crystal Palace

In 1851 the Great Exhibition in Hyde Park was housed in an immense glass building, called the Crystal Palace. In 1854 the building was bought by a private company, dismantled and re-erected at Penge Peak on Sydenham Hill (now Crystal Palace Park). Exhibitions, concerts, conferences and sporting events were held at the Crystal Palace (until it burned down in 1936), and Sydenham became a fashionable area with many new houses being built. In 1871 the French impressionist painter Camille Pissarro produced The Avenue, Sydenham, a largely still recognisable view on today's Lawrie Park Avenue; the painting is now owned by the National Gallery.

In 1860 the Walter Cobb department store at Lawrie Place, Kirkdale (now known as Cobbs Corner) opened, lasting until the 1980s. In 1872, the Children's Hospital, Sydenham opened. It closed in 1991, its services being now part of the University Hospital Lewisham. In 1884, Upper Sydenham railway station opened on the Crystal Palace and South London Junction Railway linking Crystal Palace to London Victoria via Peckham Rye. The station and the line were poorly used despite new houses being built in the area, as passengers preferred to use other stations near-by, Sydenham Hill (opening in 1863), Crystal Palace (Lower Level) and Sydenham which were on more direct routes. The ill fate of the Crystal Palace in 1936 saw patronage reduced and the route finally closed in 1954.

Sydenham was attacked by enemies during the Second World War. The gas works were a target, but were never damaged. The railway which ran through Upper Sydenham station was damaged, and some homes in the area were destroyed.

== Local area ==
Sydenham is divided into several localities:

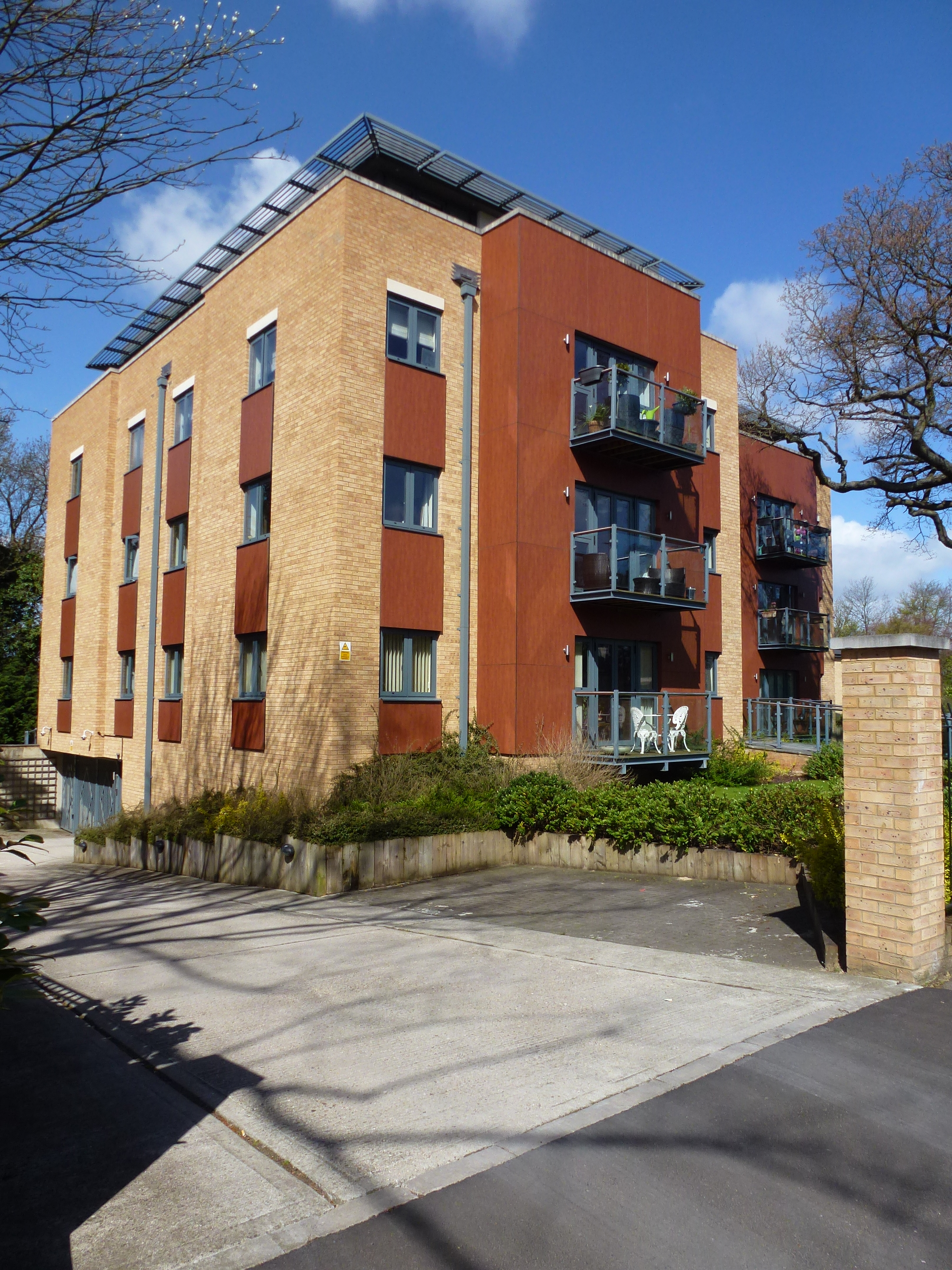
Apartment building on Sydenham Hill

Sydenham Hill in the Boroughs of Lewisham and Southwark runs alongside Dulwich and Sydenham Woods on one of the highest points of Greater London being 112 metres above sea level. From here, the City of London skyline is visible. Sydenham Hill has an abandoned railway tunnel from the Crystal Palace and South London Junction Railway located within the Woods. Another railway tunnel (one of the longest in Britain at 1,958 metres) goes beneath on the Chatham Main Line with Sydenham Hill station at the London end serving both Sydenham Hill and the college area of Dulwich.

Upper Sydenham is also located on Sydenham Hill and is a part of the Parish of St Bartholomew. It is diverse both racially and in terms of income; the central section of Kirkdale was Sydenham's original High Street. Renamed "Kirkdale" in 1936, the area now has a small range of shops including Tesco Express, local pubs and off-licences. Sydenham School is located on Dartmouth Road with Forest Hill Library and Forest Hill Pools alongside Thorpewood Avenue. Green Flag awarded Sydenham Wells Park, the location of the once famous Springs is one of the largest parks within the postcode.

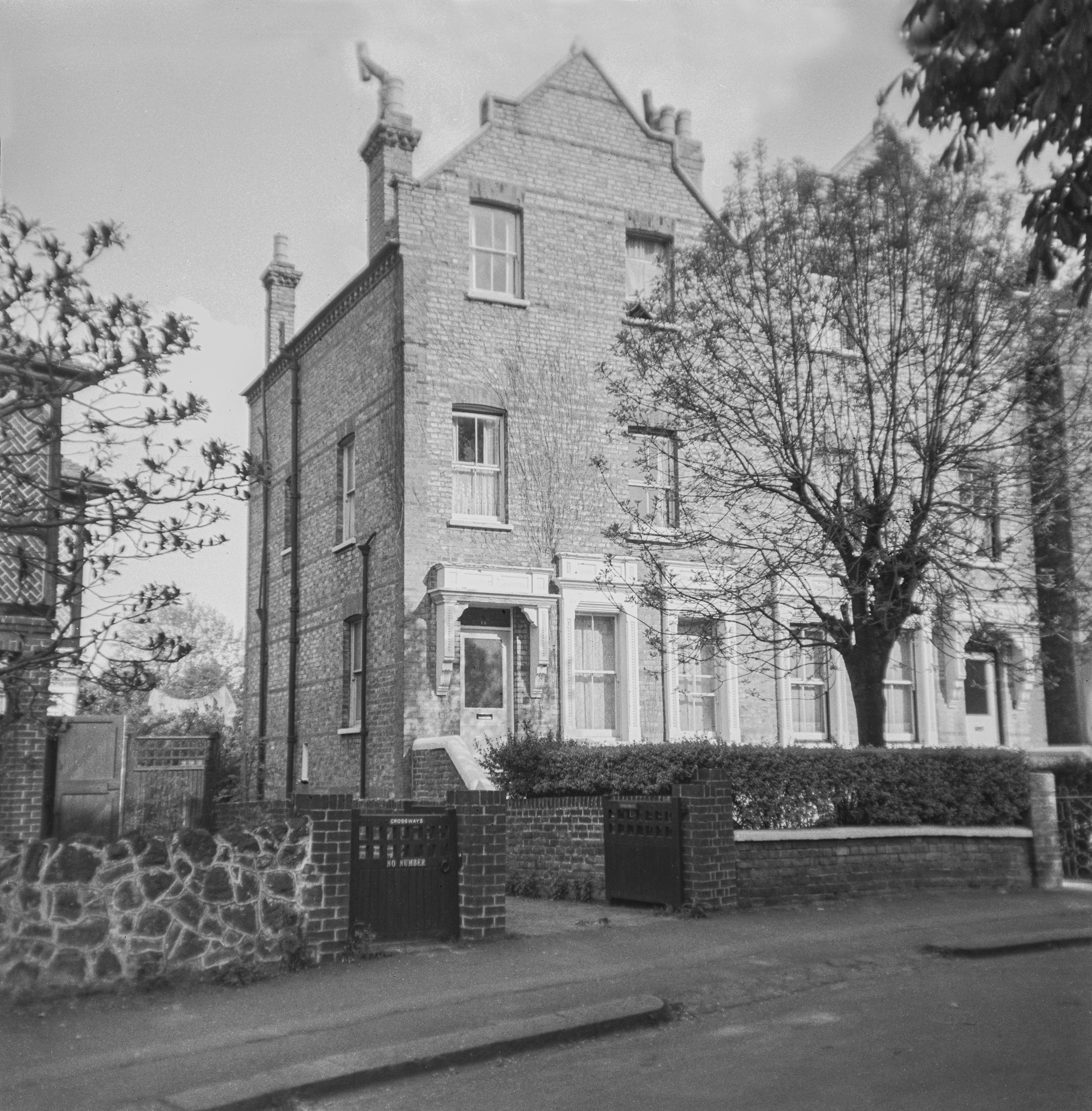
Charleville Circus in Upper Sydenham

In the area where West Hill (later renamed Westwood Hill) and Crystal Palace Park Road raise in elevation and eventually meet, many fine villas were built in the latter half of the nineteenth century. Designed in revival architectural styles, fashionable at the time, most of the properties were three or four stories high and large enough to attract more affluent residents. UK Census records suggest that many employed one or more live-in domestic staff. One of the more unusual residential streets, due to its circular arrangement is Charleville Circus, subject of an in-depth One-place study. Upper Sydenham is also the location of the Sydenham Park allotments, the Sydenham electricity sub station which had a major fire in 2008 and the Sydenham Hill estate.

Lower Sydenham & Bell Green is the location of the Sydenham Community Library (run by Calico Projects CIO and part of the Lewisham Libraries network). Alongside to the library is Home Park and the Home Park estate. The Bridge Leisure Centre is located on Kangley Bridge Road, near to Lower Sydenham railway station and an industrial estate home to Clarkes coach company, many other businesses and the Beckenham and Sydenham Cricket Ground. Bell Green retail park houses the Sydenham Gas Works and a large Sainsbury's superstore. The section of Kangley Bridge Road that runs south of Lower Sydenham Station is in the London Borough of Bromley and provides land for local employment.

=== Commercial area ===
Sydenham's main commercial area begins on Kirkdale around Cobbs Corner, continuing onto Sydenham Road, often known as "Sydenham High Street". It houses many independent shops, including a bakery, bookshop and several restaurants and chains stores. Furthermore, Sydenham is noted for the number of independent coffee shops. There is a Post Office branch and many estate agents. After recent closures, Natwest remains the only bank with a branch in the High Street. The first ever location of the Morley's chicken chain opened in Sydenham in 1985, and remains in operation today.

Since the Transport for London and Lewisham Council funded high street upgrade in 2012–13, there is now a monthly market located within the pocket squares, known as "Queensthorpe Square" and "Venner Square". The 18th century Greyhound pub, demolished by a developer without council permission in 2013, was rebuilt and reopened in 2017. Several new businesses such as a Sainsbury's Local opened in 2016 and Kinleigh Folkard & Hayward Estate Agents in 2021/22.

=== Community ===
Sydenham has a very active community, with several groups concerning the local area. Sydenham Town is the local website for the area, where residents can also voice their opinions in an on-line form. The Sydenham Society is a Civil society formed in 1972 to represent the local community. It holds local events, works with organisations and authorities as well as campaigning for improvements to the area. Green Flag and Mayor of London Award winner, Sydenham Garden, was formed in 2002. It is a charity which is involved in improving the health of residents in the boroughs of Bromley and Lewisham.

Sydenham with Forest Hill won a bid for the national Portas Pilot competition which provided a grant to improve high streets; extra money was provided from Lewisham Council and private developers. Annually every summer since 2009, the Sydenham Arts Festival is held, where there are workshops, music, family activities etc.

=== Conservation areas ===
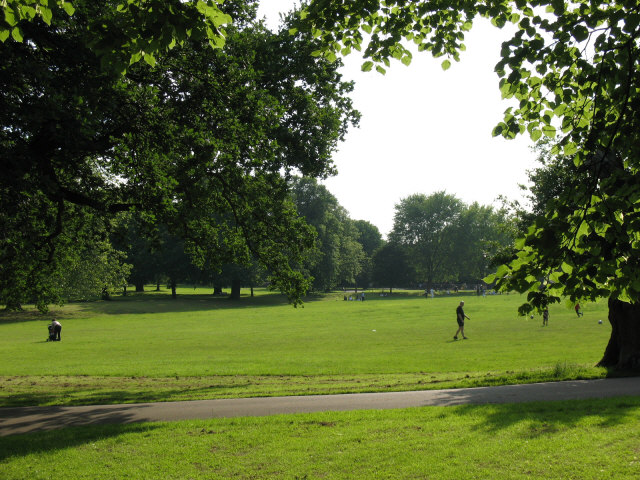
Mayow Park was originally known as Sydenham Recreational Ground

Sydenham has seven conservation areas: Cobbs Corner, Dulwich Village (covering Crescent Wood Road), Halifax Street, Sydenham Hill/Kirkdale, Sydenham Park and Sydenham Thorpes. Sydenham has the highest concentration of conservation areas in the London Borough of Lewisham.

=== Recreation ===
A number of parks are within the Sydenham postcode. Mayow Park, Lewisham's oldest municipal park and Sydenham Wells Park are both Green Flag Awarded. Other open spaces in Sydenham include Alexandra Recreation Ground, Baxters Field, Home Park and Kirkdale Green. Riverview Walk is a nature conservation area which runs along the River Pool from Catford. Additionally, located along the borders of Sydenham, there are Crystal Palace Park, Dulwich Woods, Southend Park and Sydenham Hill Woods.

Alongside Dulwich and Sydenham Hill Woods is the Dulwich and Sydenham Golf course, dating back to 1893. Located on Lawrie Park Road, there is the Sydenham Tennis Club, while the Beckenham and Sydenham Cricket Ground and the Lewisham Indoor Bowls Centre are both located in the Lower Sydenham industrial estate.

=== Sydenham Arts ===
Sydenham Arts is a local charitable organisation, promoting the arts for the local community, which provides free and ticketed cultural events at several festivals through the year.

=== Notable buildings and structures ===
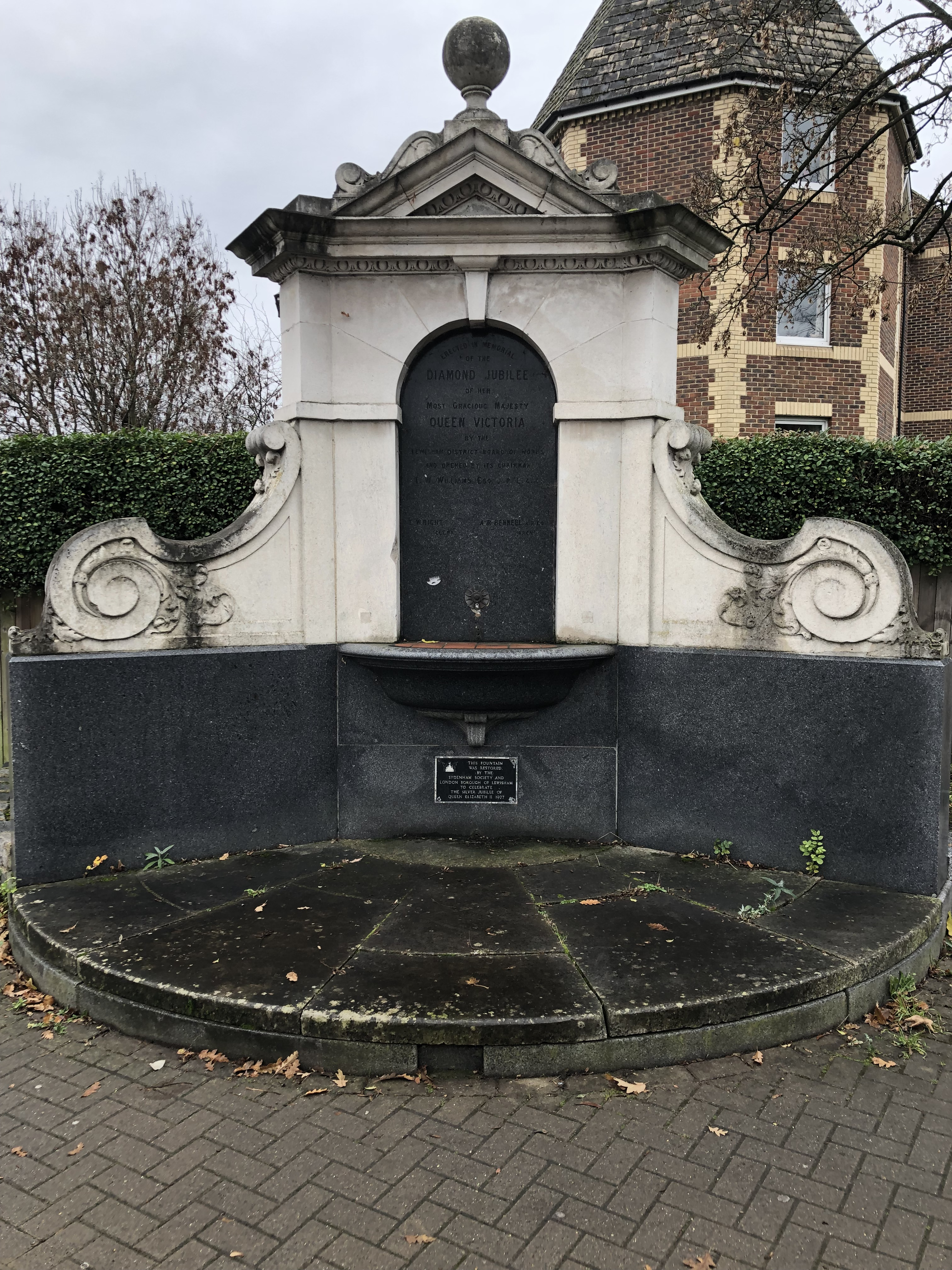
Drinking fountain erected to commemorate the 1897 Diamond Jubilee of Queen Victoria and restored for the Silver Jubilee of Elizabeth II in 1977

- St Bartholomew's church, (1827–1832), at the end of Lawrie Park Avenue, featured in Camille Pissarro's painting of 1871: "The Avenue, Sydenham". The building was designed by Lewis Vulliamy.
- Park Court, (1936), by Frederick Gibberd, pioneering modernist development of residential flats on the estate on Lawrie Park Road adjacent to the famous Crystal Palace Park.
- Six Pillars, (1934–35), by Berthold Lubetkin, on Crescent Wood Road, a villa strongly in the spirit of Le Corbusier with eponymous six pillars at street level.
- Cobbs Corner, takes its name from a draper's shop at 291–307 Kirkdale run by Walter Cobb. The shop grew into a large department store catering to the gentry of the area. Interesting imposing dome where you can find the date on the building.
- 180 and 182 Kirkdale, built in the 1850s in Gothic style, with Tudor doorcases.
- 168–178 Kirkdale, three pairs of Italianate houses built around 1862. Number 174 was briefly the home of the conductor August Manns.
- Memorial to Queen Victoria (1897), baroque-style memorial celebrating Queen Victoria's Diamond Jubilee. Restored for Queen Elizabeth II's Silver Jubilee and designed by Alexander Hennell, a Sydenham resident and architect.
- Jews Walk, it is believed that a wealthy Jewish resident planted a row of trees to define the boundary of his walk from the Common. Numbers 2,4 and 6 are classical villas dating from the 1840s. Karl Marx's daughter Eleanor lived on Jews Walk. On 9 September 2008 a blue English Heritage plaque was placed on the house to commemorate this fact.
- Halifax Street, beautifully preserved street with houses dating from the 1840s. Of notice are in particular the closeness of the houses, the length of the street and the size of the gardens.
- The Kirkdale Building, previously the Sydenham Public Lecture Hall, was built in 1861 by Sydenham resident Henry Dawson.
- Sydenham Community Library is a Carnegie Library built in 1904.

== Education ==
There are five non-religious primary schools in Sydenham (Alexandra, Adamsrill, Eliot Bank, Haseltine and Kelvin Grove) and three religious schools (St. Michael's, St Philip Neri and St. Bartholomew's Church of England). Sydenham contains two secondary schools, the private Sydenham High School and the state Sydenham School. Both of these schools are exclusively for girls. Forest Hill (for boys) is just outside Sydenham across from Mayow Park. Other secondary schools close by include Harris Bromley (for girls), Harris Crystal Palace, Sedgehill and the private Dulwich College. There are no colleges in Sydenham, but Sydenham and Forest Hill schools have a joint sixth form.

== Population ==
According to the 2011 census, the SE26 postcode area had a population of 28,378, with 13,714 males and 14,664 females.

=== Famous residents ===
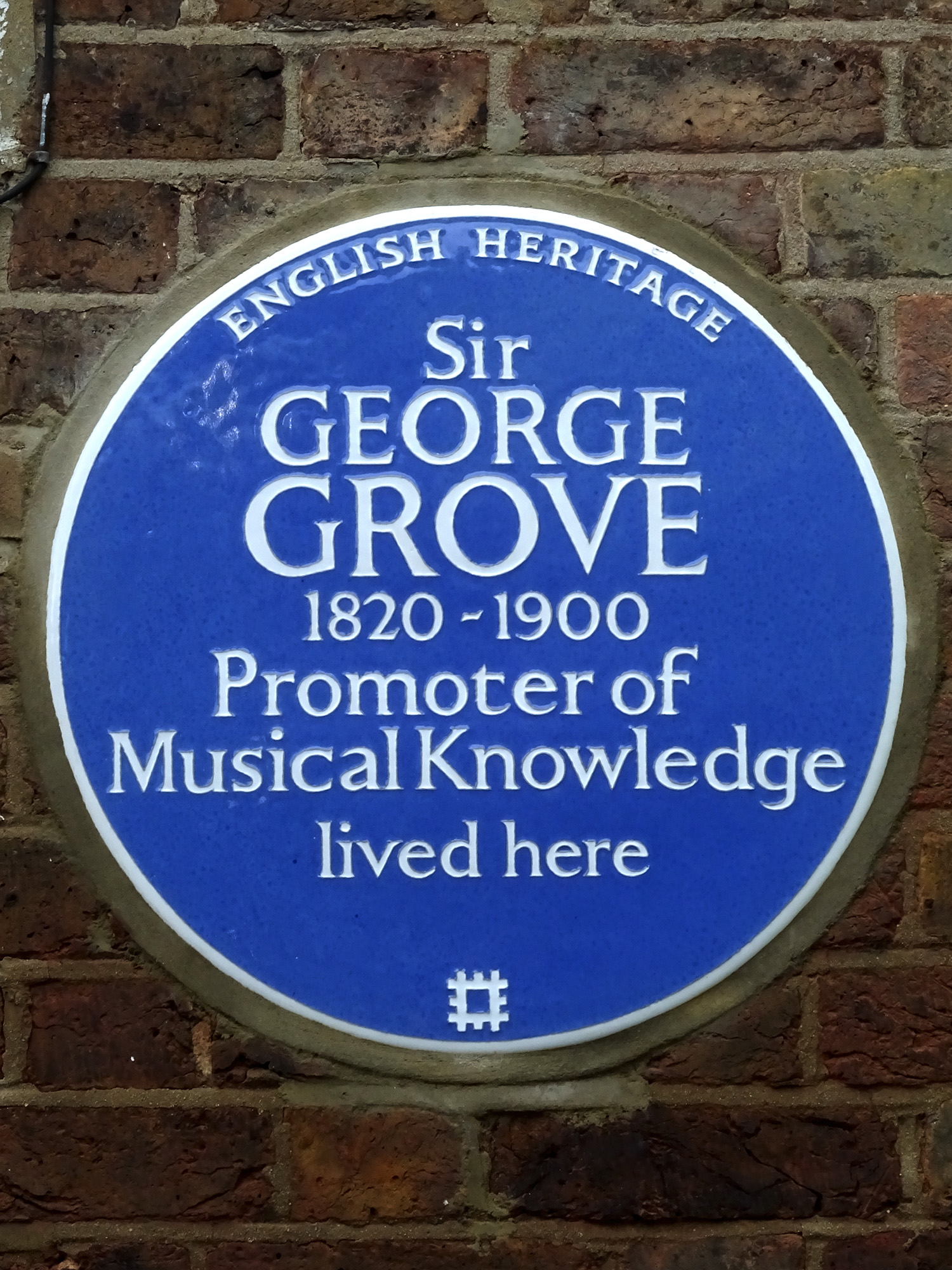
Sir George Grove English Heritage Blue Plaque at Westwood Hill

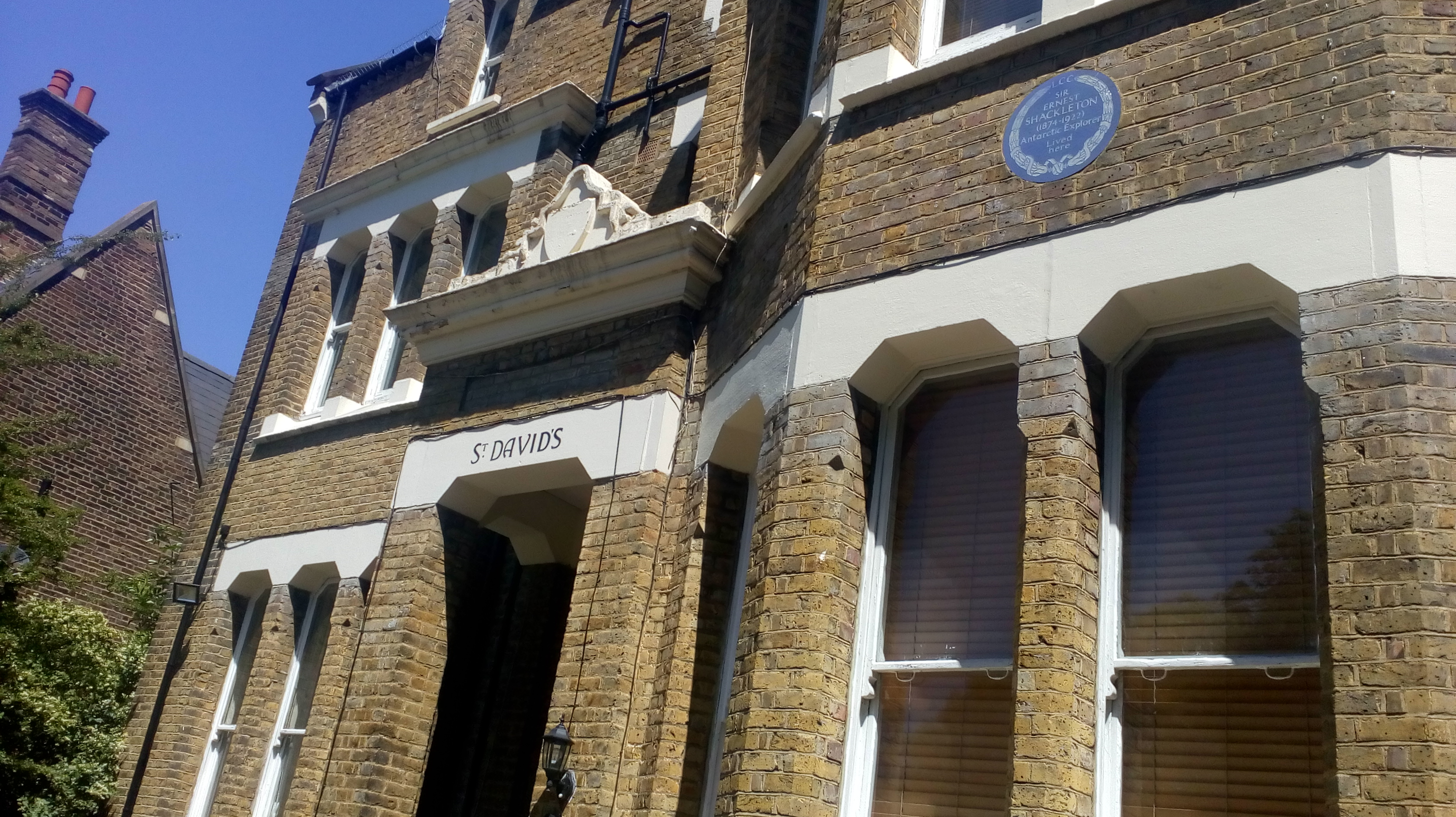
Blue plaque marking the home of Ernest Shackleton at 12 Westwood Hill, Sydenham

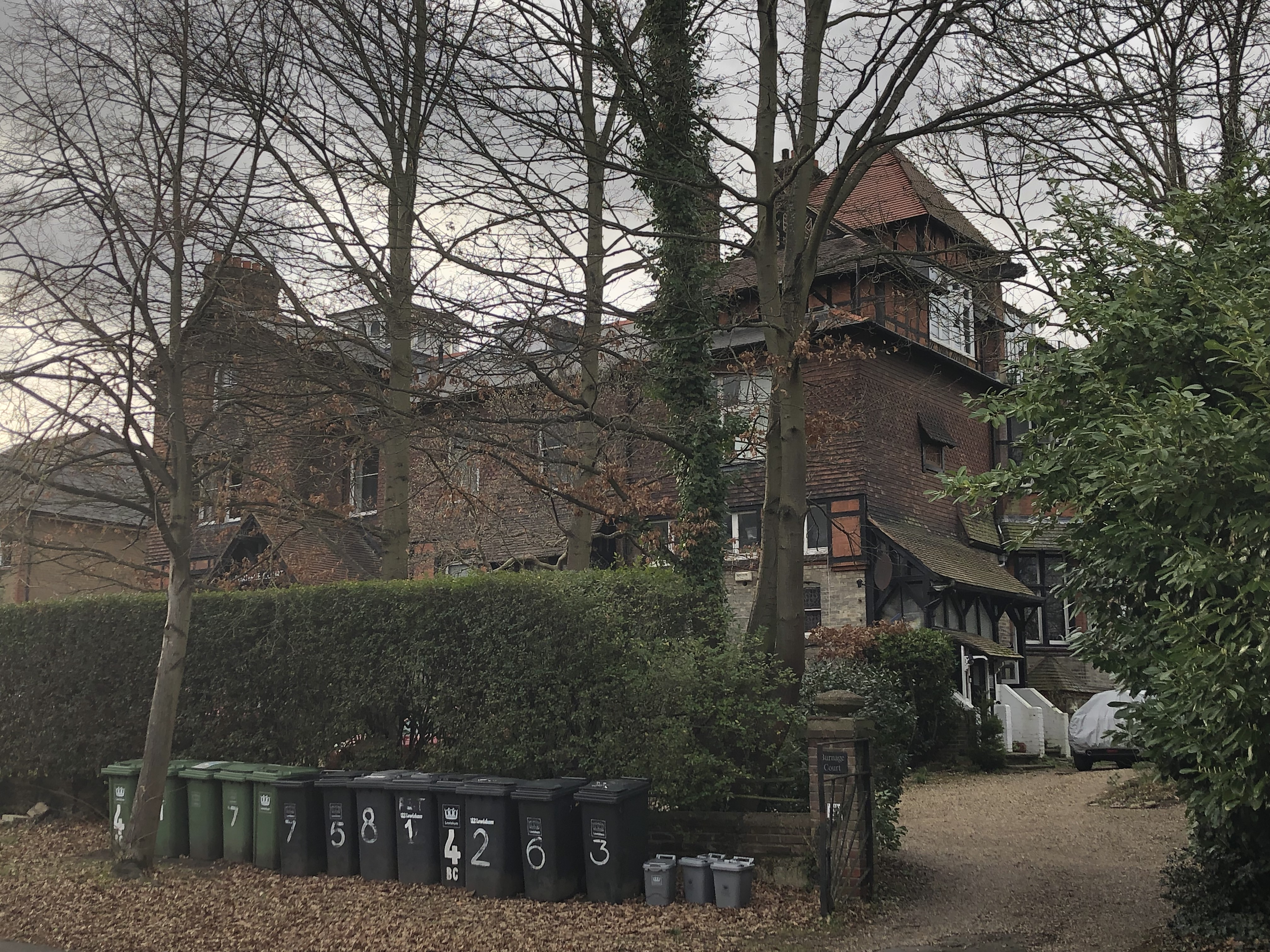
Burnage Court, Lawrie Park Avenue, Sydenham, complete with 1888 datestone

- A-ha – Norwegian pop band lived in Sydenham and recorded early demos at Rendezvous studios on Kirkdale with John Ratcliff.
- John Arnott — footballer
- Edward Aveling — biologist and social activist, partner of Eleanor Marx
- John Logie Baird — inventor of both the first publicly demonstrated colour television system, and the first purely electronic colour television picture tube
- George Baxter — inventor of colour printing, lived on Peak Hill from 1860 till his death in 1867. There is a memorial at former Christ Church, Forest Hill.
- Dietrich Bonhoeffer.
- David Bowie — spent five years living in Sydenham in his early adult life.
- Bill Bradley — cricketer
- Kelly Brook — the model and actress once shared a home with then boyfriend Billy Zane in Lawrie Park Road
- Thomas Campbell — poet
- Louise Creighton — social activist and writer, born in Sydenham
- Connie Fisher — singer and actress, winner of the BBC TV program How Do You Solve A Problem Like Maria?
- Bud Flanagan — music hall singer/entertainer, died in Sydenham
- Denis Gifford — comics and film historian
- Wilfrid de Glehn — painter, was born in Sydenham
- W. G. Grace — England's greatest cricketer
- George Grove — of musical dictionary fame
- Rolf Harris — musician, television personality, painter and actor, was a key figure in the Sydenham Society
- Norman Hunter — writer and creator of Professor Branestawm
- Richard Jefferies — the naturalist and author, lived at 20 Sydenham Park (a blue plaque indicates the house)
- Flora Klickmann — editor of The Girls Own Paper from 1908 to 1931.
- René Lalique — according to Henri Vever, Lalique studied at Sydenham Art College between 1878 and 1880
- Prof Edmund Albert Letts FRSE — chemist, born in Sydenham
- Margaret Lockwood — star of Alfred Hitchcock's The Lady Vanishes (1938)
- Lionel Logue CVO — Australian speech therapist and stage actor who successfully treated, among others, King George VI. He lived in a villa named Beechgrove from 1933 to 1940
- Linda Ludgrove — Commonwealth gold medallist swimmer
- Joseph Marryat — merchant, banker, MP and father of the author Frederick Marryat
- Eleanor Marx — daughter of Karl Marx, lived and died in Sydenham
- John Dudley North – aircraft designer, born at Sydenham
- Sandy Powell — three-time Academy Award winning costume designer
- John Scott Russell — naval architect who built the SS Great Eastern
- Dame Cicely Saunders — founder of the modern hospice movement
- Ernest Shackleton — the Antarctic explorer
- Francis Pettit Smith — one of the inventors of the screw propeller
- Charlene Soraia — alternative singer-songwriter, born and grew up in Sydenham
- Jason Statham — film actor
- David Henry Stone — Sheriff and Lord Mayor of London, lived at 'Fairwood' on Sydenham Hill
- Baroness Mary Warnock – philosopher, writer and life peer
- David Wiffen — singer-songwriter, born in Sydenham in 1942
- Bill Wyman — member of The Rolling Stones, grew up in Sydenham
- Billy Zane — the Titanic actor once shared a home with then girlfriend Kelly Brook in Lawrie Park Road

== Transport ==
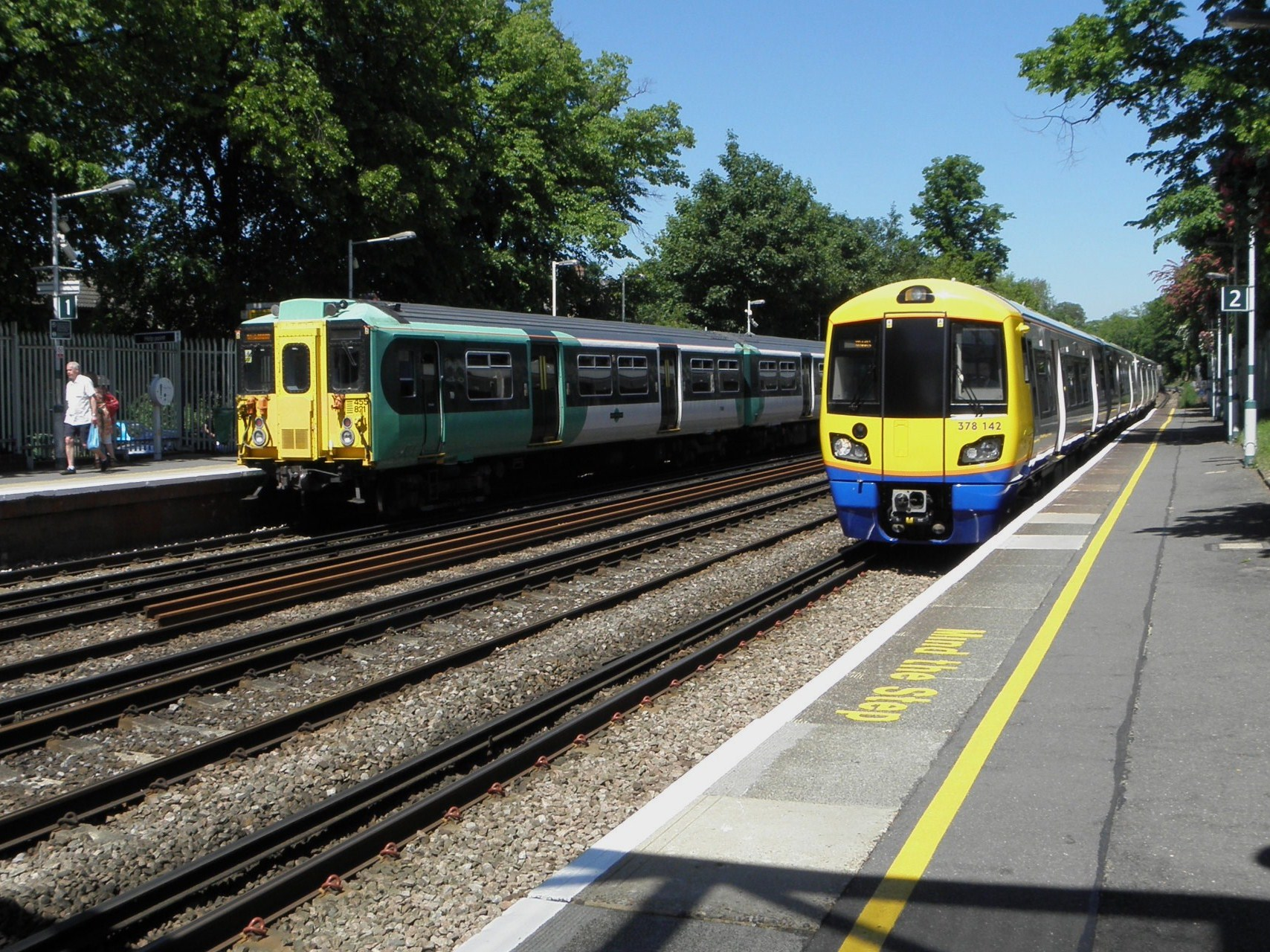
Southern and London Overground trains at Sydenham

Sydenham is served by National Rail and London Buses for its public transport. Sydenham is located in London fare zones 3 and 4.

=== Railway stations ===
- Sydenham for London Overground's Windrush line, and Southern services to London Bridge, London Victoria, East & West Croydon, Clapham Junction, Caterham, Shoreditch High Street and Highbury & Islington. This is the busiest station, with up to 12 trains per hour off peak and a usage of 4 million passengers in year 2015–16
- Sydenham Hill and Penge East stations for Southeastern services to London Victoria, Brixton, Bromley South and Orpington.
- Lower Sydenham station also is served by Southeastern but with services to London Charing Cross, London Waterloo East, London Cannon Street, London Bridge, Hayes and Lewisham.

=== Buses ===
The area is served by routes 75, 122, 176, 181, 194, 197, 202, 227, 352, 356, 363, 450 and N63 linking Sydenham to Central London, Lewisham, Catford, Croydon, Thornton Heath, Bromley, Shirley, Peckham, Camberwell, Elephant & Castle, Blackheath, Forest Hill, Penge, South Norwood and Grove Park.

=== Roads ===
The South Circular Road passes close by in Forest Hill. High Street improvements being funded by Transport for London from September 2012 are making the increasingly busy Sydenham Road (A212) more user friendly. So far, Kirkdale to Mayow Road has been completed, with Mayow Road to Kent House Road, as of December 2013, being upgraded. The Kent House Road to Bell Green section is still waiting for funding to be found.

== Geography ==
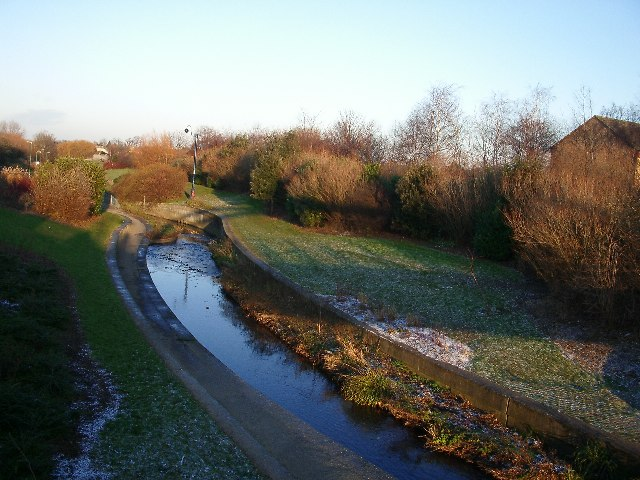
The River Pool at Lower Sydenham

Sydenham is approximately 7 miles (11 kilometres) to the south east of Charing Cross. It is also at the centre of many of south London's major shopping districts being 3 mi (5 km) south of Lewisham, 3.2 mi (5.1 km) north west of Bromley and 3 1/2 mi (5.6 km) north of Croydon.

Upper Sydenham and Sydenham Hill is located on the large Norwood Ridge formed of London Claygate beds deposits; Sydenham Hill is one of the highest points in London at 367 feet (112 m). Sydenham Hill Wood is a nine-hectare nature reserve located west of Sydenham Hill Road, along with Dulwich and Sydenham Hill Golf course. The hill was once covered by the Great North Wood which covered all of Sydenham, Norwood, Woodside, Gipsy Hill etc. In the 19th Century it was home to the spa and health resort of Sydenham Wells.

The western parts of Sydenham, from Upper Sydenham and Forest Hill towards Crystal Palace Park is a more leafy, suburban area with some parts like the Lawrie Park and Thorpes areas being more affluent than others. Lower Sydenham at the bottom of more gentle slopes being east of Upper Sydenham, south of Forest Hill and west of Bellingham. The River Pool, a 5.1 mi (8.2 km) tributary of the River Ravensbourne straddles the east of Lower Sydenham along the Hayes railway line.

=== Climate ===
The nearest Met Office climate station is based in Greenwich Park:

Climate data for London (LHR), (Note: Averages are taken from Heathrow, and extremes are taken from stations across London.) elevation: 25 m (82 ft), 1991–2020 normals
Month	Jan	Feb	Mar	Apr	May	Jun	Jul	Aug	Sep	Oct	Nov	Dec	Year
Record high °C (°F)	17.2 (63.0)	21.2 (70.2)	24.5 (76.1)	29.4 (84.9)	35.1 (95.2)	36.4 (97.5)	40.2 (104.4)	38.2 (100.8)	35.0 (95.0)	29.5 (85.1)	21.1 (70.0)	17.4 (63.3)	40.2 (104.4)
Mean maximum °C (°F)	13.3 (55.9)	14.3 (57.7)	17.6 (63.7)	22.2 (72.0)	26.2 (79.2)	29.4 (84.9)	31.2 (88.2)	30.6 (87.1)	26.2 (79.2)	21.0 (69.8)	16.7 (62.1)	13.9 (57.0)	32.6 (90.7)
Mean daily maximum °C (°F)	8.4 (47.1)	9.0 (48.2)	11.7 (53.1)	15.0 (59.0)	18.4 (65.1)	21.6 (70.9)	23.9 (75.0)	23.4 (74.1)	20.2 (68.4)	15.8 (60.4)	11.5 (52.7)	8.8 (47.8)	15.7 (60.3)
Daily mean °C (°F)	5.6 (42.1)	5.8 (42.4)	7.9 (46.2)	10.5 (50.9)	13.7 (56.7)	16.8 (62.2)	19.0 (66.2)	18.7 (65.7)	15.9 (60.6)	12.3 (54.1)	8.4 (47.1)	5.9 (42.6)	11.7 (53.1)
Mean daily minimum °C (°F)	2.7 (36.9)	2.7 (36.9)	4.1 (39.4)	6.0 (42.8)	9.1 (48.4)	12.0 (53.6)	14.2 (57.6)	14.1 (57.4)	11.6 (52.9)	8.8 (47.8)	5.3 (41.5)	3.1 (37.6)	7.8 (46.0)
Mean minimum °C (°F)	−3.7 (25.3)	−3.3 (26.1)	−1.5 (29.3)	0.4 (32.7)	3.3 (37.9)	7.3 (45.1)	10.2 (50.4)	9.2 (48.6)	6.4 (43.5)	2.4 (36.3)	−1.3 (29.7)	−3.4 (25.9)	−5.3 (22.5)
Record low °C (°F)	−16.1 (3.0)	−13.9 (7.0)	−8.9 (16.0)	−5.6 (21.9)	−3.1 (26.4)	−0.6 (30.9)	3.9 (39.0)	2.1 (35.8)	1.4 (34.5)	−5.5 (22.1)	−7.1 (19.2)	−17.4 (0.7)	−17.4 (0.7)
Average precipitation mm (inches)	58.8 (2.31)	45.0 (1.77)	38.8 (1.53)	42.3 (1.67)	45.9 (1.81)	47.3 (1.86)	45.8 (1.80)	52.8 (2.08)	49.6 (1.95)	65.1 (2.56)	66.6 (2.62)	57.1 (2.25)	615.0 (24.21)
Average precipitation days (≥ 1.0 mm)	11.5	9.5	8.5	8.8	8.0	8.3	7.9	8.4	7.9	10.8	11.2	10.8	111.7
Average relative humidity (%)	84	78	73	67	68	69	67	71	75	82	85	85	75
Average dew point °C (°F)	3 (37)	2 (36)	3 (37)	4 (39)	7 (45)	10 (50)	12 (54)	12 (54)	11 (52)	9 (48)	6 (43)	5 (41)	7 (45)
Mean monthly sunshine hours	61.1	78.8	124.5	176.7	207.5	208.4	217.8	202.1	157.1	115.2	70.7	55.0	1,674.8
Percentage possible sunshine	23	28	31	40	41	41	42	45	40	35	27	21	35
Average ultraviolet index	1	1	2	4	5	6	6	5	4	2	1	0	3
Source 1: Met OfficeRoyal Netherlands Meteorological Institute
Source 2: Weather Atlas (percent sunshine and UV Index)CEDA ArchiveTORROTime and Date See Climate of London for additional climate information.

== Trivia ==
The Beast of Sydenham of 2005, was a large, panther-like black animal, which had been spotted around the area, and attacked a man. The beast was said to be 6 ft in length and 3 ft in height.

In March 2022, a crested caracara, named Jester, which escaped London Zoo, was spotted in Mayow Park, Sydenham.

== See also ==
- Sydenham Hill Wood
- Sydenham, Christchurch named after Sydenham, London
- Sydenham, Sydney, New South Wales also named after Sydenham, London

Sydenham, Melbourne Victoria yet another place named after Sydenham London

- Sydenham School
- Sydenham High School
- The Crystal Palace
