= Forest Hill Pools =

London leisure centre

Coordinates: 51°26′10″N 00°03′20″W

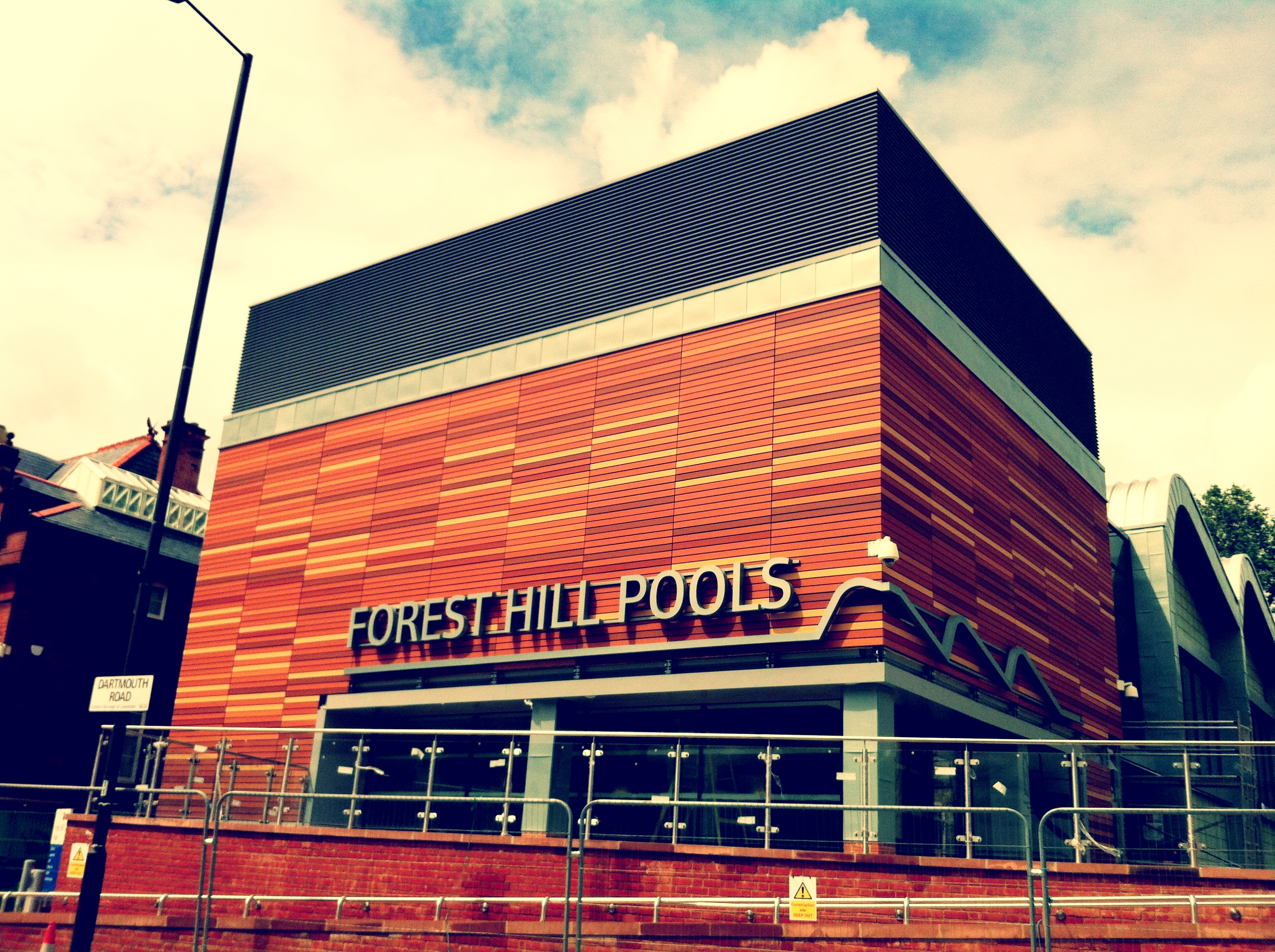
Forest Hill Pools

Forest Hill Pools is a leisure centre in Forest Hill, London. After being closed in 2006, it was rebuilt including two pools and a health and fitness suite and reopened in September 2012. It is located close to Forest Hill railway station, Forest Hill Library and Sydenham School.

== Facilities ==
Forest Hill Pools has two pools, the 25 m length main swimming pool and the 16.7 m length learner pool. In addition, two exercise studios and a gym can be used for classes or a work-out. Also, a café area opened after the rebuild and a community room is available for hire.

== Location ==
Forest Hill Pools are located on Dartmouth Road in Forest Hill, London (SE23 3HZ), in the centre of the town. Bus stop 'Forest Hill Pools' is right outside the building, served by buses 122, 24-Hour Route 176 and 197. The nearest train station is Forest Hill railway station which has frequent London Overground services with East London as well as with Crystal Palace and West Croydon. In addition, Southern trains go to London Bridge, Caterham and London Victoria.

== History ==
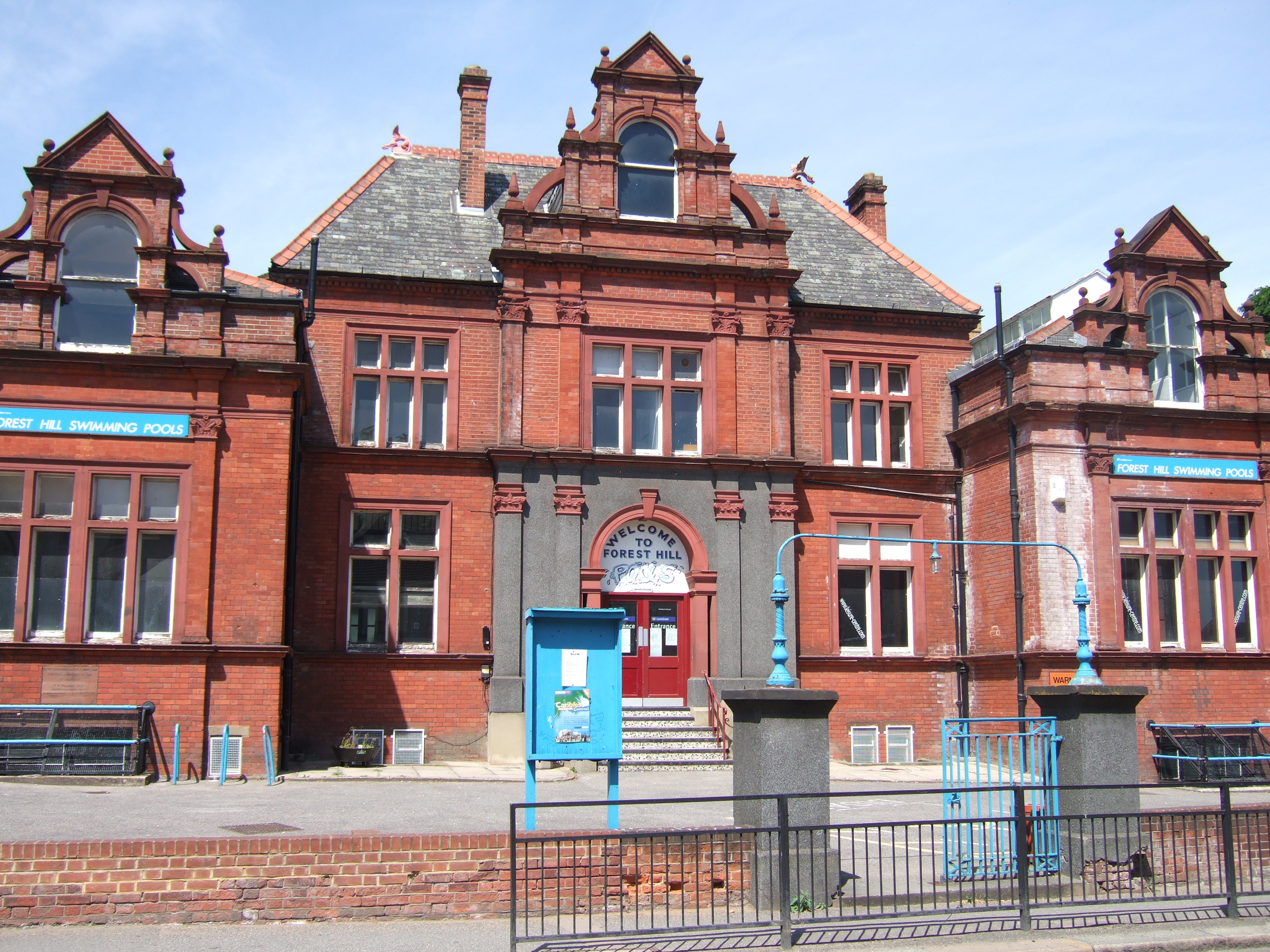
The original Victorian pool building was entirely demolished in 2010

The original Forest Hill Pools are a Victorian building. As the still existing foundation stone tells (3 May 1884), construction started in 1884. It was completed about a year later, providing an Upper and a Working Class swimming pool throughout the summer—in winter the First Class pool was boarded up and the space used for social events and political gatherings.

In 2006, the original Victorian building was closed down following health and safety advice. After some debate, the pools were rebuilt in a new building using the original Victorian structure as the entrance. Now also included are a gym, a café and two group exercise studios. The new leisure centre was run by Fusion Corporation in the name of Lewisham Council. In 2021, after closing for a year due to the coronavirus pandemic, the centre re-opened under the management of Better (formerly GLL).

=== Redevelopment timeline ===
This is a short summary of the Lewisham Council rebuilding timeline with some extra information, referenced where added:

- March 2006: Forest Hill Pools are closed following health and safety advice and detailed investigations of the building were undertaken, e.g. problems with the roof were further examined.
- August 2006: English Heritage recommends the Forest Hill Pools not to be listed. Lewisham council commissions an intrusive survey of the condition of the building and its infrastructure.
- December 2006: The intrusive survey concludes that the building has retained its structural integrity making a refurbishment of the existing pools a possible but prospectively expensive option.
- February 2008: Recommendations to demolish Forest Hill Pools and replace the building with a new leisure facility have been accepted by the Mayor of Lewisham, Sir Steve Bullock. Some local residents oppose the demolition plans.
- August 2008: Louise House, a building situated right next to the Forest Hill Pools, is listed by the English Heritage. A couple of days later a previously planned public discussion takes place with great attendancy. In the following, the development is re-evaluated and the process delayed due to these considerations.
- February 2009: The Mayor and Cabinet meet on 25 February 2009 and decide on the further steps to be taken, based on a report with three possible rework options.
- May 2009: Lewisham Council ran a public consultation on two of the proposed options from 27 April 2009 to 29 May 2009 to help determine where and when the new centre will be built.
- July 2009: The consultation report is discussed at a Mayor and Cabinet meeting on 15 July 2009, leading to the decision to start work on the preferred option immediately, with extra funding from Lewisham Council's building programme having become available. Local residents who campaigned to preserve the swimming pools at the site are content with this decision
- November 2009: Detailed plans for the new pools are developed.
- April 2010: Following public consultation on the design, the programme management team submitted a full planning application for a leisure centre with two pools, health and fitness suite, two studios, community room, café and landscaped outdoor area.

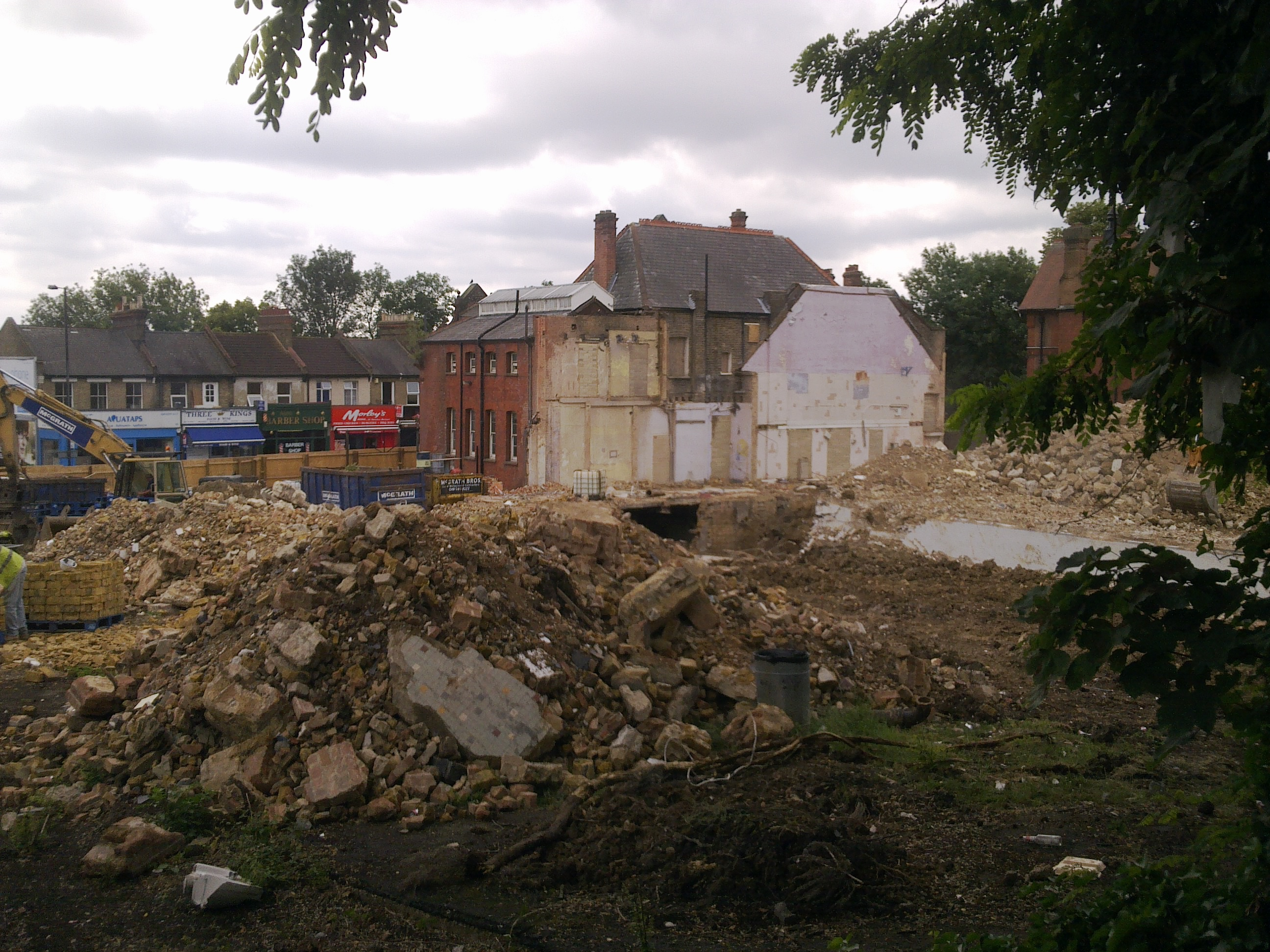
Demolition of the old building

- July 2010: Planning permission for the new pools is granted on 22 July and the old pools are demolished.
- November 2010: A contractor for the construction of the new pools is appointed.
- February 2011: Construction works begin.
- September 2012: Forest Hill Pools reopen to the public. Even though the official opening was only on 22 September, the facilities were open to the public as of 15 September.

== See also ==
- Lewisham London Borough Council
- Forest Hill
- Sydenham
