= Sydenham Wells Park =

Park in London, England

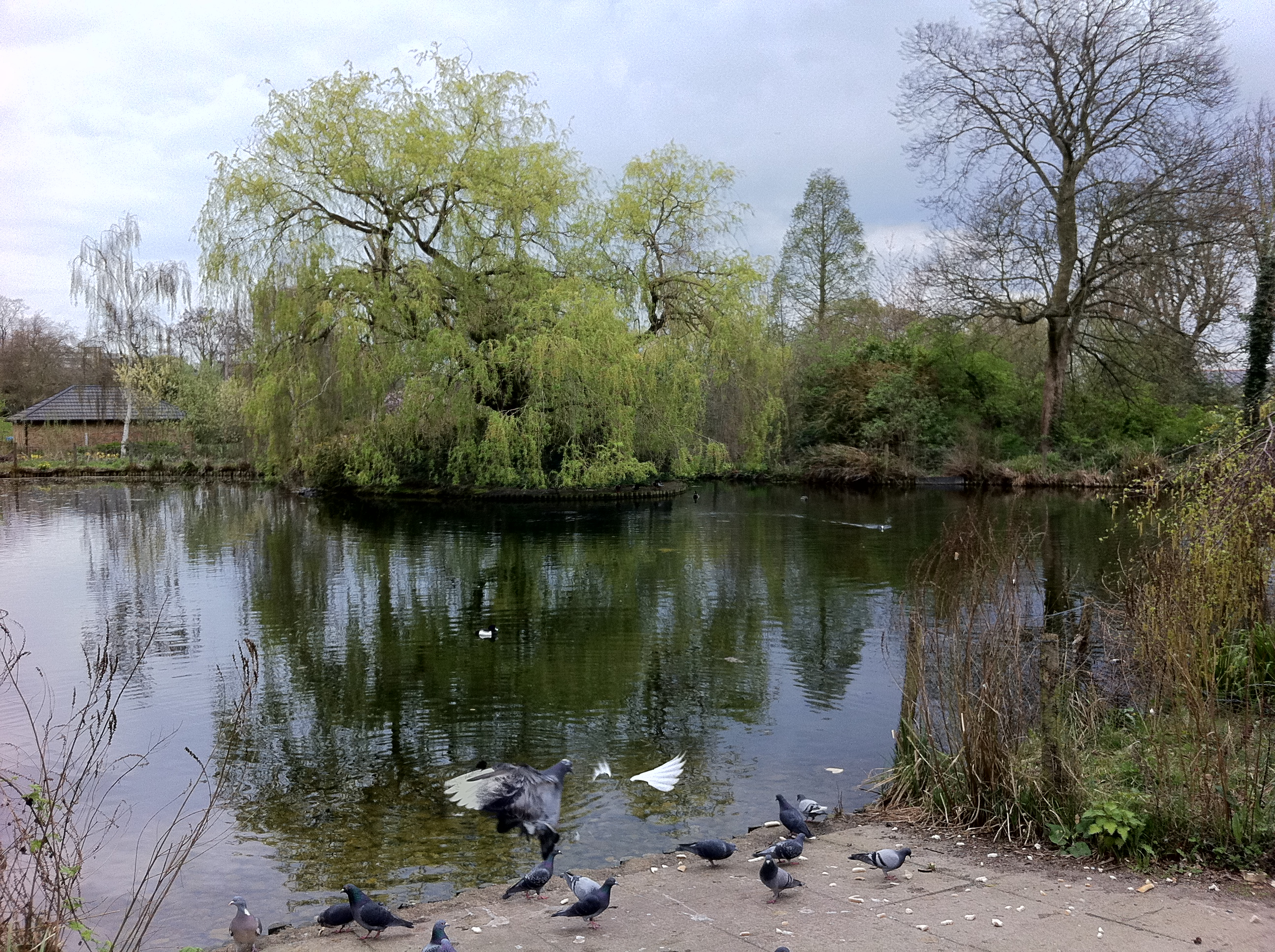
- Sydenham Wells Park is named after medicinal springs
- Interactive map of Sydenham Wells Park
- Type: Public park
- Location: Upper Sydenham
- Coordinates: 51.428728°N 0.068342°W
- Created: 1901
- Operator: Glendale
- Status: Open
- Website: Sydenham Wells Park

Sydenham Wells Park is located in Sydenham, south east London. It includes parks and fields. The park is owned by the London Borough of Lewisham and maintained by Glendale. Wells Park is named after medicinal springs which were found in Sydenham in the seventeenth century, when Sydenham was still in Kent. This attracted crowds of people to the area. Some of the former wells in the area are within the park's grounds and the springs are still active. In 1901 the park was opened to the public and is one of nine parks in the borough to have a Green flag award. Open times vary throughout the year.

== Facilities ==
The park has a number of facilities including an under fives playground, a large playground for over fives with a water play area, a multi surface court with basketball and football facilities, a tennis court, nature reserve, flower gardens, ponds and toilets in the grounds keepers building.

== Transport ==
Wells Park is located on Wells Park Road with Longton Avenue and Taylors Lane also surrounding it. London Buses routes 202 and 356 have two bus stops (on each side of the road) serving the park.

The nearest station is Sydenham, which is 0.75 miles away and has services run by London Overground and Southern.

== See also ==
- Sydenham
- Sydenham Hill
- Sydenham Hill Wood
- Crystal Palace Park
