= Walter Cobb (department store) =

Former department store in London

Coordinates: 51.42750°N 0.05617°W

Walter Cobb was a department store located in Sydenham in South London. It opened in 1860 and closed in 1981.

== History ==
The Walter Cobb store was founded by Walter Cobb, who was born in Canterbury in 1835, and learnt his trade as a draper in Dover.

In 1860, Cobb opened the store in Lawrie Place, a newly built parade, as a ladies outfitters, with his wife and their shop assistants living above the store. By 1862 the business was described as General Drapery Establishment, selling shawls, dresses, mantles, family mourning wear and having a millinery department.

Cobb was an astute business and marketing man. He advertised his store as having the latest fashions from Paris and London. Over the next 30 years, he purchased shops either side of his property, expanding the Walter Cobb store into each unit with new departments. The business by 1898 occupied 297-301 Kirdale, 270-272 Kirkdale, a furniture depository in Silverdale and an estate agents and funeral parlour at 1-3 Railway Approach.

By 1900, the Walter Cobb store ran the length of Lawrie Place except for the butcher store on the corner. The store was declared to be the equal of Harrods, Harvey Nichols and Marshall & Snelgrove in a Times article of the time. In 1900, the butcher store finally sold out and Walter Cobb built the grand corner entrance to his store which finally opened in 1902 with its grand dome pediment. Walter was also a costume maker for the 1911 Festival of empire at the Crystal Palace. The Walter Cobb store continued to operate, past Cobb's death in 1922 up and to the Second World War.

During the London bombings of World War II, three quarters of the Walter Cobb store was demolished; however the business continued to operate in a condensed form. The business was however grown by the purchase of Penge department store Bryce Grant. The Walter Cobb store was rebuilt slowly, with the building not being completed until 1960. During this time the business continued to open new departments including selling hardware.

The 1970s saw the Walter Cobb store decline. The store closed in 1981.
