= Forest Hill School =

- The Forest Hill School logo

Location
- Forest Hill, London Borough of Lewisham; England; 51.4318°N 0.0477°W

Information
- Type: Community school
- Established: 1956
- Local authority: Lewisham
- Department for Education URN: 100745 Tables
- Ofsted: Reports
- Head teacher: Michael Sullivan
- Gender: Boys (Girls in Sixth Form)
- Age: 11 to 18
- Enrolment: 1098 (2023-2024)
- Sixth form students: 231
- Houses: Ofosu-Asare (formerly Drake); Turing (formerly Harvey); Parks (formerly Reynolds); Tull (formerly Shackleton)
- Website: foresthill.lewisham.sch.uk

Forest Hill School is a boys' secondary school and sixth form located in Forest Hill, in the London Borough of Lewisham. The school is in federation with the girls' secondary, Sydenham School, which is nearby.

In 2005 the school was given Performing Arts status for its Drama, Dance, Music and Art courses and currently has a silver artsmark from the English Arts Council. The school has an Investors in People award, and in October 2021, it became the first school in London to receive the Stonewall School Champion Gold award.

As of late 2023, 1098 students were enrolled at the school, including 219 enrolled in the sixth form. This was down from 1255, including 231 sixth form students, in late 2021.

== History ==
Forest Hill Comprehensive School opened in September 1956. It was built on the site of St. Magnus, a large house that was the home of Baron Johann Knoop from 1870 and 1900. In the Second World War it became a Heavy Recovery Centre, dealing with bomb damage. After the War it fell into disrepair.

The School was a flagship of the London County Council's new policy of building comprehensive schools that aimed to breakdown the previous national policy of selecting children, largely on 11-plus results, to attend grammar, technical or secondary modern schools. It eventually grew to around 1,500 boys.

The first head teacher was Alexander E. Howard, who was a leading national figure in technical education. In its early years the school attracted considerable interest from educationalists. The following is a report of a visit to the school in July 1957 by the American educationalist Flaud C. Wooton.

I spent June 4, 1957, with William H. Perkins (Educational Director, Imperial Chemicals, Ltd., London) and John Aseltine (San Diego educator) at the London County Council comprehensive school at Forest Hill. That school was opened in September, 1956, and currently enrolls 900 to 1000 boys. Its buildings are new and among the best I saw last spring in eight countries of Europe. The teaching staff is relatively young, well trained, vigorous, and enthusiastic. Above all, the headmaster, Mr. A. E. Howard, in frank discussion, revealed educational ideas and described the school's purposes and practices with combined competence and optimism. As the English comprehensive school spreads, it will, if it lives up to Forest Hill, brighten the future of secondary education in Great Britain.

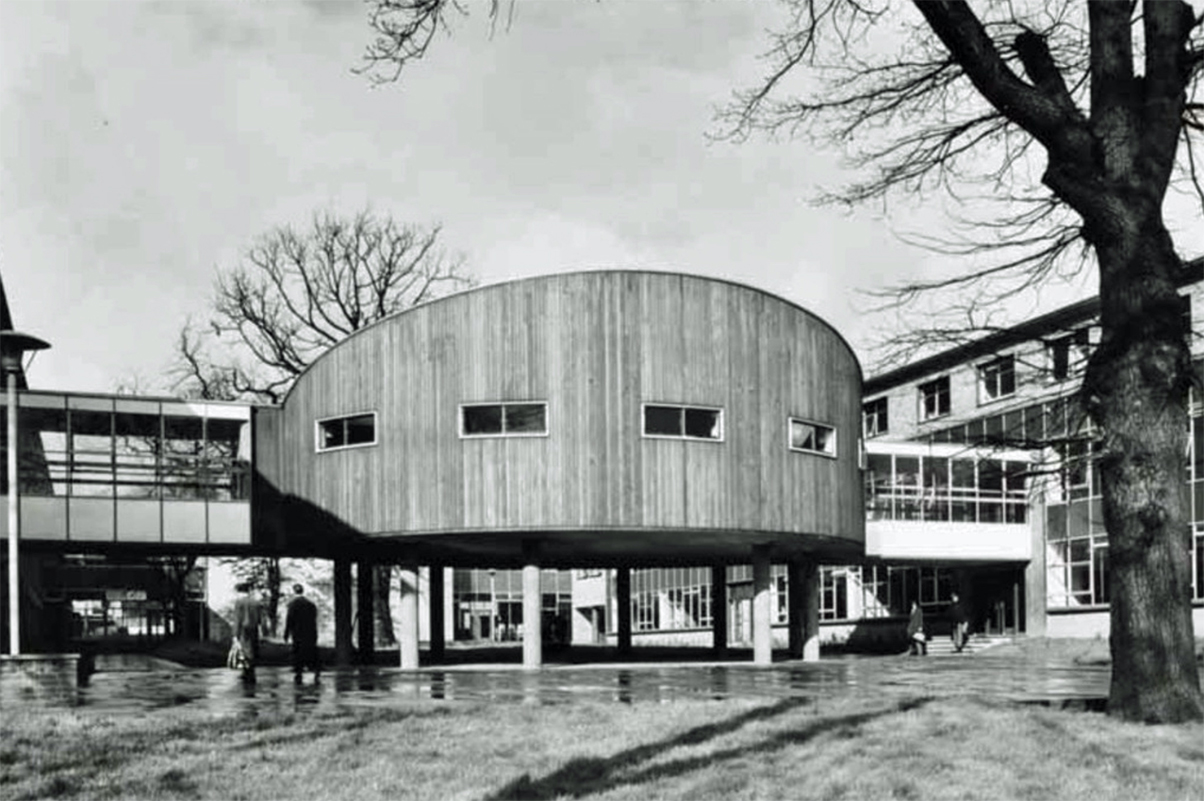
Forest Hill School from Mayow Road, late 1950s. The prominent position of the distinctive Library indicated the academic ambitions of the School.

The academic quality of the early cadre of teachers is indicated by the careers that some went on to. Paul Ashbee became Professor of Archaeology at the University of Anglia. Laurie Taylor taught English and drama and went on to a career in sociology and broadcasting. The historian Al Richardson also taught at the school for 30 years.

The School attracted press attention with many of its activities in the 1960s. In 1962, the School organised a trip to the United States, which the Daily Mirror headlined: 'An Exceptional School ... With Exceptional Boys: 76 Ambassadors from London SE23'. It was described as "a grammar, technical, commercial, central and modern school – all in one", with one boy quoted as saying "None of the boys would change Forest Hill School for Eton." The school also had its own film unit and produced feature-length films including Twenty Four Hundred Pennies (1962) and The Custard Boys (1979), which starred pupils and staff from the school.

In 2016 the school was forced to cut costs by an annual £1.3M, as funding had been cut as part of a political decision at Westminster.

== Current ==
In 2005 the school was given Performing Arts status for its Drama, Dance, Music and Art courses. The school has an Investors in People award, and in October 2021, it became the first school in London to receive the Stonewall School Champion Gold award.

== Houses ==
The four houses of Forest Hill were named after famous people of the 16th, 17th, 18th and early 20th centuries. Originally there were six houses, but two were later dropped: Browning and Newton. When there were six houses, Browning's house colour was red, Drake's dark blue, Reynold's light blue and Newton's maroon. The houses went on to become Drake (Red), Harvey (Yellow), Reynolds (light blue) and Shackleton (dark green).

Following a review process that began in October 2019, the school decided to update the names to reflect the diversity of the school and the surrounding community, as well as modern values. A selection process, which included consultations with students, resulted in four new figures being selected as the house names. These were: Ofosu-Asare (formerly Drake), named after Kwame Ofosu-Asare, a former student of the school who was killed in a knife crime due to mistaken identity in 2012, Turing (formerly Harvey), Parks (formerly Reynolds) and Tull (formerly Shackleton). These changes were put into effect in September 2020.

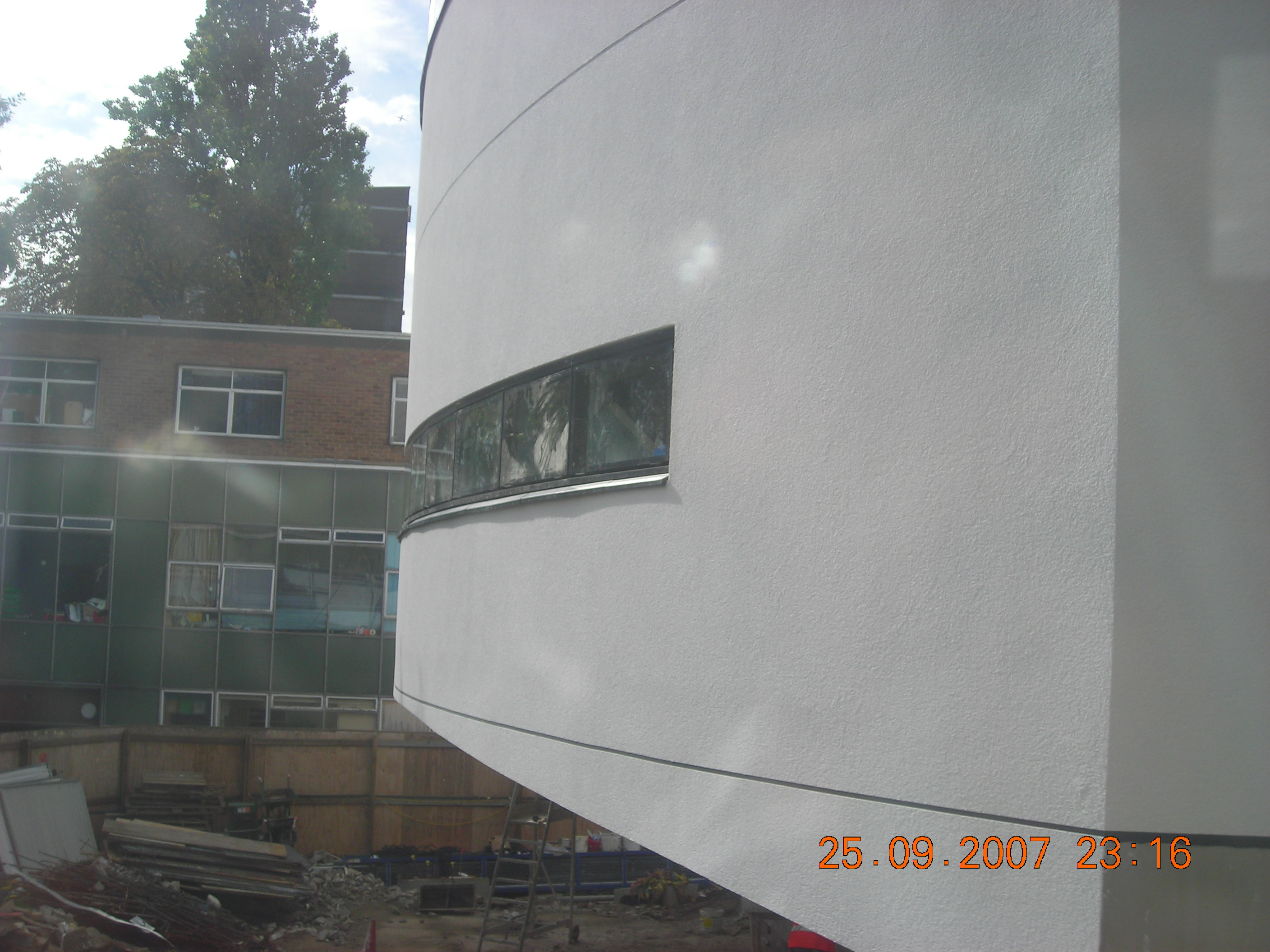
The new main building of Forest Hill School seen during redevelopment in September 2007

== Redevelopment ==
=== Sports Hall ===
In 2006 the school's new £4.5M state-of-the-art sports facility was opened with lottery funding and help with Sport England and The FA Charter Standard Schools Program. The facility features a large air conditioned sports hall with basketball nets, indoor cricket, indoor football markings and goals and a scoreboard. The other part of the gym includes a fitness suite, cafè, space for trampolining and table tennis, new changing room facilities with showers and also two of the old three gyms. The sports centre opened on top of Gym 3, but was also expanded towards Bampton Road on the other side of the school.

=== Main building ===
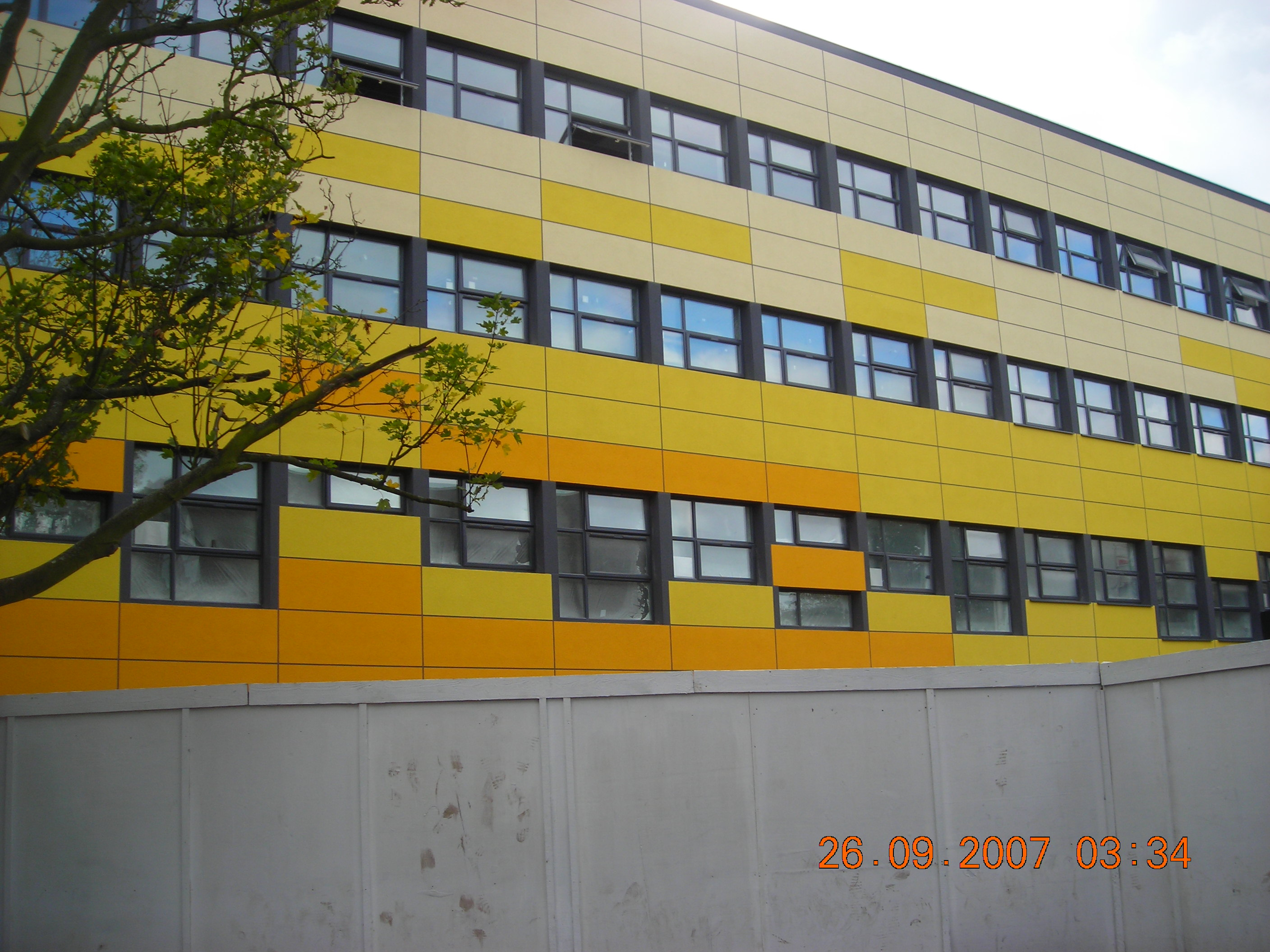
The new school during redevelopment

The school began a major redevelopment project in July 2006 which completed in January 2008. The only part of the school which remains unchanged is the current art block, which was built recently. The rest of the school was demolished and rebuilt from the ground up with the three-floor plan changed to a higher four-story building. The new school building now features a large atrium which can also act as a fully functioning theatre, two fully equipped drama rooms, a separate theatre, a fully equipped music department with a Recording studio and a Mac computer room. There is also a dance studio with sprung floors, mirrors, and a 600 watt speaker system.

== Notable people educated at Forest Hill School ==
- Joe Absolom, actor
- Dave Courtney, former gangster and author
- Michael Ellam, civil servant and banker
- James Ellington, Olympic athlete
- Joe Gomez, plays Premier League football for Liverpool F.C. and Charlton Athletic
- Brian Jacks, Olympic judo bronze medalist and TV sports personality
- Andy Kane aka "Handy Andy", television DIY expert (Changing Rooms)
- Eman Kellam, YouTube and television personality
- Marlon King, played Premier League football for Watford, Wigan Athletic, Hull City
- King Krule, musician
- Manny Monthé, footballer for Tranmere Rovers
- Glen Murphy (Pulse) of Twist & Pulse, street dancer
- Valentine Nonyela, actor and producer
- Kasey Palmer, footballer for Coventry City
- Richard Rufus, footballer
- Sean Scully, contemporary artist, based in New York
