= Brixton station =

Brixton station may refer to:

- Brixton railway station
- Brixton tube station, a London Underground station and southern terminus for the Victoria line
