= Labinjo =

Labinjo is a surname. Notable people with the surname include:

- Alfred Labinjo (died 1885), Nigerian munitions merchant, from Imesi-ile
- Joy Labinjo (born 1994), English artist of Nigerian descent
- Mike Labinjo (1980–2018), Canadian gridiron football player
- Arthur Labinjo‑Hughes (2014-2020), British murder victim
