= Brixton murals =

Series of murals by local artists in the Brixton area, in London

Big Splash, on Glenelg Road (London SW2) by Christine Thomas, assisted by Dave Bangs and Diana Leary – 1985.

The Brixton murals are a series of murals by local artists in the Brixton area, in south London. Most of the murals were funded by Lambeth London Borough Council and the Greater London Council after the Brixton riots in 1981.

The murals portray politics, community and ideas. Many are now in a state of disrepair and some are no longer there.

The remaining murals are within walking distance of each other.

== Brixton murals history ==
- Slade Gardens Adventure Playground Association Mural, Lorn Road, by Gordon Wilkinson and Sarah Faulkner – 1982. This mural features the people who worked and played at the adventure playground. It is a snapshot in time of the surrounding buildings, playground structures and local residents.
- Stockwell War Memorial, Stockwell Road, by Brian Barnes – 2001. Painted on the exterior of the entrance to a deep-level shelter, this mural was executed by Brian Barnes (with the assistance of children from Stockwell Park School). It features Stockwell's famous people such as Violette Szabo and Vincent van Gogh. It also commemorates the locals who gave their life in the war. This mural was listed in Time Out as one of London's top 10 murals. Controversy surrounded the mural in 2005, when Brian Barnes added a painting of Jean Charles de Menezes to the memorial, which was removed soon after.
- Children at Play Stockwell Park Walk, by Stephen Pusey – 1982. This mural was created by Pusey in 1981 and completed in 1982. It is found on the back of the Brixton Academy building. The mural commission had been created on the back of the Brixton riots of 1981. It shows a mixed group of young people hanging out and having fun. It was to portray the natural racial harmony that could be found between the children in the local schools. It is painted in Keim Silicate. At 30 feet by 104 feet, it is one of London's biggest murals.
- Mural 1, Bellefields Road, by London Wall Public Art – 1987. Funded by Lambeth Council and the GLC. It features much reference to the area such as a bell for Bellefields Road and a pile of bricks for Brixton. There is also the symbol of the recreation centre and an old theatre featured in the mural.
- Mural 2, Bellefields Road, by London Wall Public Art with the help of the local artists Eugene Palmer and John Saward, painted in 1988. It features a seaside scene and was funded by Lambeth council, the GLC and BP.
- Brixton railway station Murals 1 and 2 These two murals were painted by a mural partnership called Anchor Designs made up of two local artists, Karen Smith and Angie Biltcliffe, who painted many more murals in the borough and were funded by Lambeth Council.
- Nuclear Dawn, Coldharbour Lane, by Brian Barnes and Dale McCrea, assisted by Christine Thomas. This mural was painted between 1980 and 1981. It depicts a giant skeleton standing over London whilst the nuclear bomb destroys the city. This mural has a political tone, criticising the government of the day, with the Conservative Party in a bunker as chaos reigns above ground. The bottom was restored in the early 1980s by Brian Barnes and Christine Thomas, who worked on the feet and the Houses of Parliament. The people in the bunker were updated when the restoration was carried out.
- Big Splash, Glenelg Road, designed and painted by Christine Thomas, assisted by Dave Bangs and Diana Leary – 1985. This mural can be found on the junction of Glenelg Road and Strathleven Road. It tells the story of the hidden River Effra and also references the women who worked at the Doulton factory in Lambeth. Many of the people in the mural were local residents. In 2010 Time Out put it in their top 10 London murals.
- Mauleverer Road Mural by Jane Gifford, Ruth Blench, Mick Harrison and Caroline Thorp – 1983. Inspired by Brockwell Park Garden.
- The Windmill Mural, Lyham Road by Positive Arts was created in May 2012 and funded by the Heritage Lottery Fund. It was based on the design of the previous Windmill mural by Mick Harrison and Caroline Thorp, which was created in 1983. This mural was badly damaged and had faded. Both murals tells the history of Brixton's Windmill, the only inner-city windmill still surviving in London.
- The Boat, St George's Residence on Railton Road, viewed from Effra Parade, was recently re-discovered. Believed to be painted by the London Wall Mural Group – 1988. It now has many plants in front of it so it is hard to view.
- Say It Loud, painted in 2017 by Breeze Yoko in Blenheim Gardens, features a young girl holding a megaphone.
- In 2018 the artist known as Dreph completed a large mural depicting Michelle Obama in Dorrell Place.
- Since 2018, Art on the Underground has commissioned artists to create a temporary mural at Brixton tube station following the legacy of the murals. Artists have included Njideka Akunyili Crosby, Aliza Nisenbaum, Denzil Forrester and Joy Labinjo.

== Lost Brixton murals ==
The murals listed above can still be seen, but some murals are no longer intact.

- A mural on Rushcroft Road has all but gone, with only a corner still visible. It is called "Peace" and was painted in 1983 by Dale McCrea as part of the GLC for peace year.
- A mural called Golden Garden was designed by London Wall Art Group and could be found on Coldharbour Lane. It was commissioned by the Brixton branch of Woolworths to cover over riot-damaged windows. The mural was funded by the Department of Environment and Lambeth Council Partnership.
- A mural was painted on Vining Street. It was covered up by the same housing development which obscured the Rushcroft Road mural. Several inches of the mural can still be seen on the left-hand side of the mural. It is called War and was painted in 1983 by Pauline Harding as part of the GLC for peace year.

== Brixton murals gallery ==
These murals can still be seen in Brixton.

Slade Gardens Mural

Stockwell War Memorial

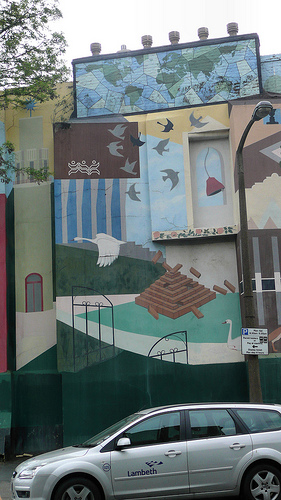
Bellefields Road Mural 1

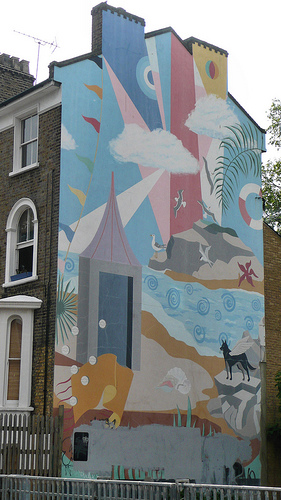
Bellefields Road Mural 2

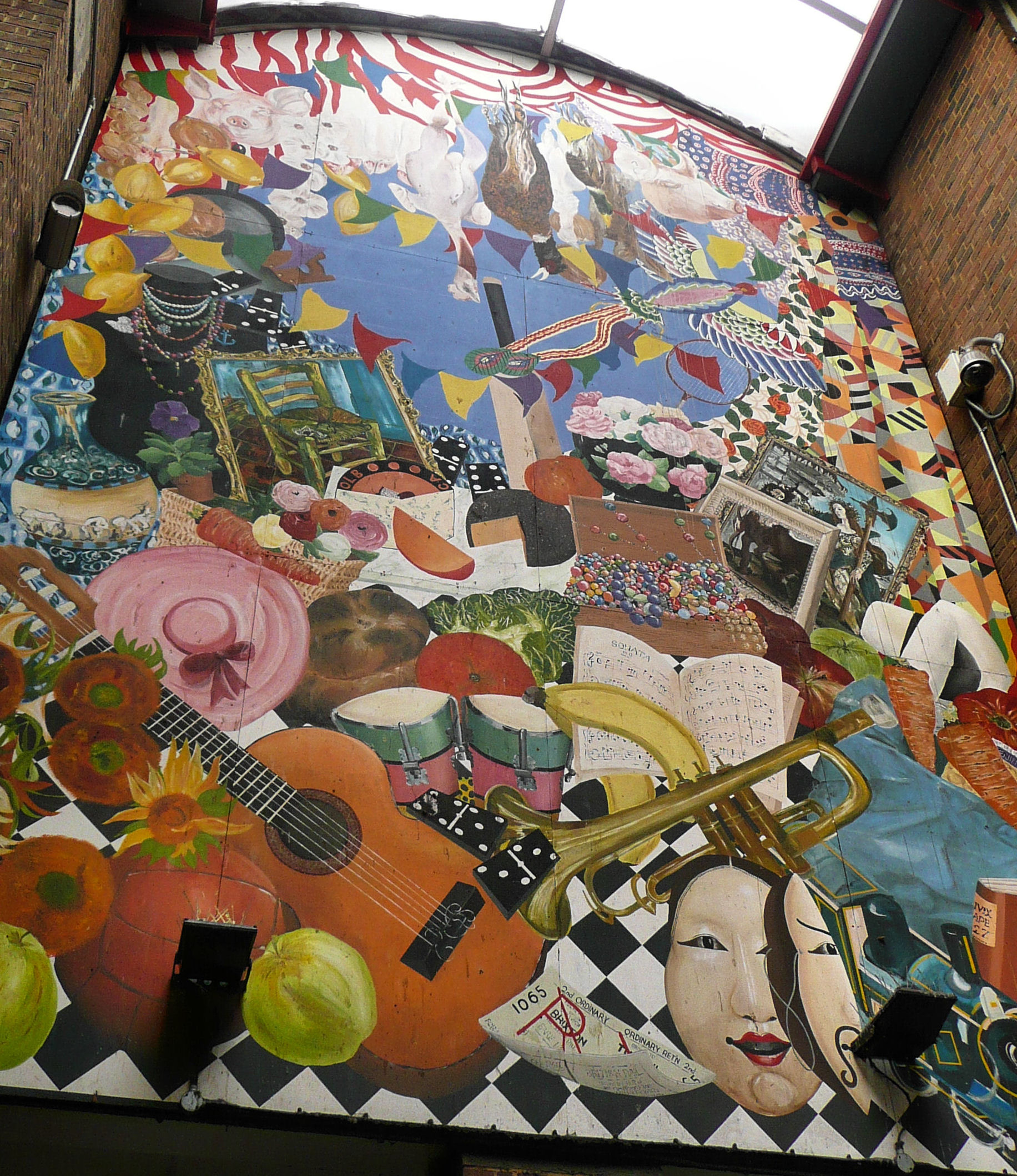
Brixton Station Mural 1

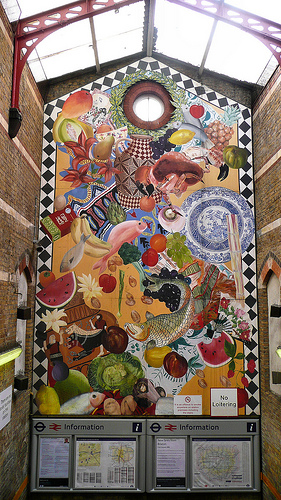
Brixton Station Mural 2

Nuclear Dawn

Splash

Mauleverer Road Mural

Mauleverer Road Mural

The Original Windmill Mural

== Sources ==
- Researched by Ruth L. Miller – all information from archives, websites, interviews with Brixton locals and mural artists done in preparation for the Brixton Mural Walk on 10 May 2008.
- Christine Thomas
- Stephen Pusey
- Timeout
- Jean Charles de Menezes in Stockwell Memorial
- Lambeth Council
- Stockwell Park Slade Gardens
- Sarah Faulkner
- Positive Arts
