= London Mural Preservation Society =

Non-profit organization in London, England

- Abbreviation: LMPS
- Formation: 2010; 16 years ago
- Founder: Ruth Miller
- Type: Nonprofit, NGO
- Purpose: Art preservation
- Location: United Kingdom
- Region served: London
- Official language: English
- Website: londonmuralpreservationsociety.wordpress.com

London Mural Preservation Society works to "Protect, Preserve and Celebrate Murals in London". The society aims to bring London murals to the attention of the people of London and the rest of the United Kingdom and the world. London murals have been described as an "endangered species".

The society was set up in 2010 and works to protect the memory of mural images by gathering information from the people involved in their creation, collecting local recollection of the mural's beginnings and bringing together photos from the past and the present. The society hope to preserve these murals by finding possible ways to fund restoration and investigate future conservation and protection. "We will celebrate the murals by bringing together those who were there from the beginning and those who walk past them every day without having a notion of their meaning and significance. Accessing the stories of the murals will be made available via the internet and through exhibitions across London."

In 2010, the society supported a project to restore the Fitzrovia Mural in Tottenham Court Road, as well as the restoration of some of the Brixton Murals.
