= Brian Barnes (artist) =

English artist (1944–2021)

Brian Barnes MBE
- Born: August 20, 1944
- Died: November 28, 2021 (aged 77)
- Education: Ravensbourne (1961–1966); Royal College of Art (1966–1969)
- Known for: Large-scale murals

Brian Barnes (20 August 1944 – 28 November 2021) was an English artist. Brian Barnes was appointed a Member of the Order of the British Empire (MBE) in 2005 for services to the community in Battersea, London.

== Life and work ==
Brian Barnes was educated at Ravensbourne from 1961 to 1966 and the Royal College of Art 1966–1969. Based in Battersea, London since 5 February 1967, Barnes is noted for colourful, large-scale murals in Battersea and the London area, designed in collaboration with local groups. His most famous mural is The Good the Bad and The Ugly, also known as The Battersea Mural, at Battersea Bridge Road, designed in 1976 and painted by a group of local people from 1976 to 1978. The 276-foot mural was demolished in 1979 by the Morgan Crucible Company.

Other important murals include Seaside Picture, Thessaly Road (1979), Nuclear Dawn in Brixton (1981), assisted by Dale McCrea and Christine Thomas (part of the Brixton murals), the H. G. Wells mural, Market Square, Bromley (1986) Battersea in Perspective, Dagnall Street (1988), and the Violette Szabo mural in Stockwell (2001).

The Violette Szabo mural also commemorates the locals who gave their life in the war. This mural was listed in Time Out as one of London's top ten murals. Controversy surrounded the mural in 2005, when Brian Barnes added a painting of Jean Charles de Menezes to the memorial which was removed soon after.

Barnes works as a printmaker, in particular dealing with local campaigns and issues, and was also involved in the long-standing campaign to preserve Battersea Power Station. He founded the Battersea Power Station Community Group in 1983, to see that the listed building is preserved and that local people are involved in the redevelopment.

He died on 28 November 2021 at the age of 77.
