= Platforms Piece =

Sculptures by Kevin Atherton

Coordinates: 51.4631°N 0.1140°W

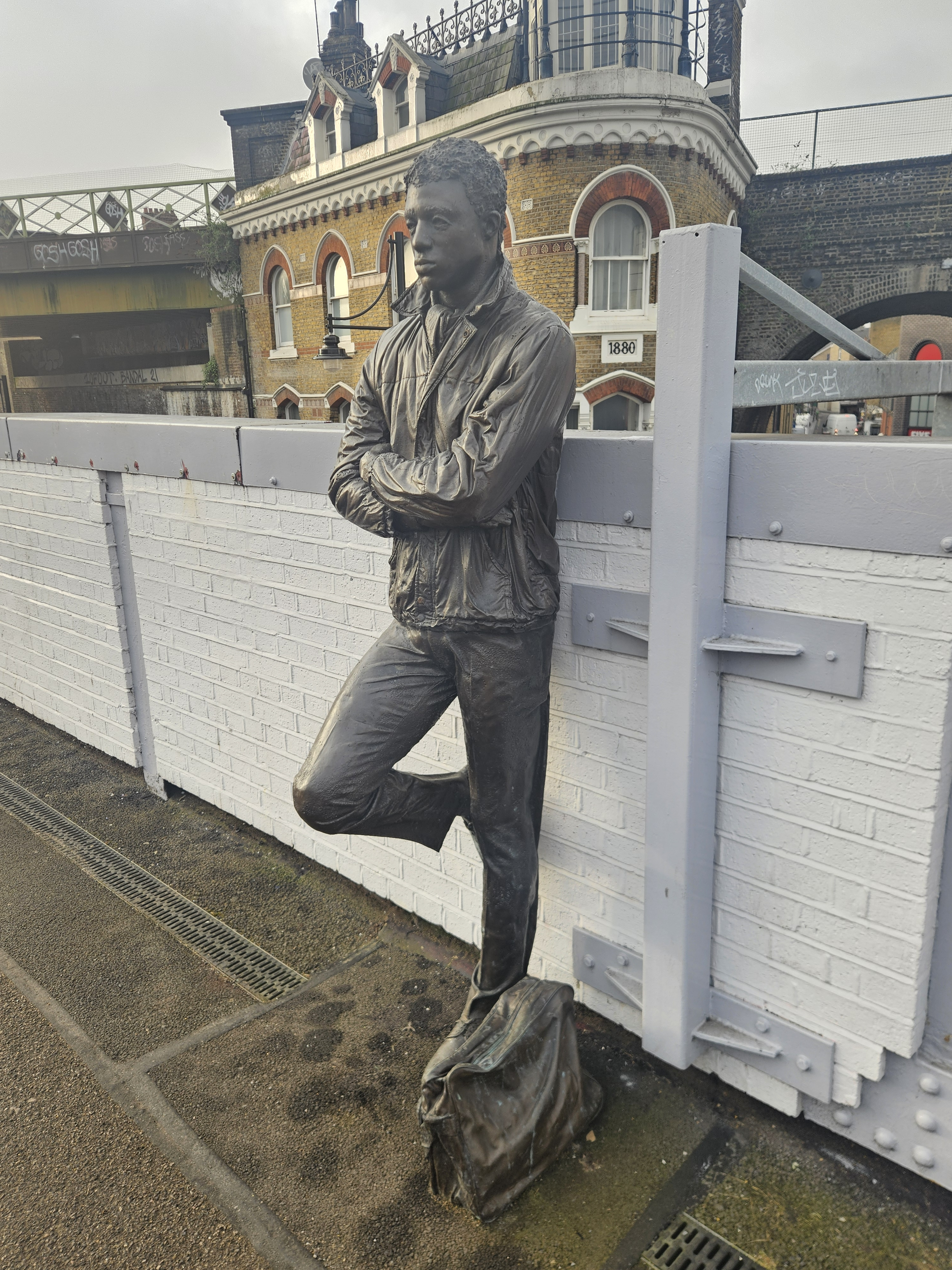
Peter Lloyd Statue on the platform Brixton Railway Station, part of Kevin Atherton's Platforms Piece. Photo: 2025

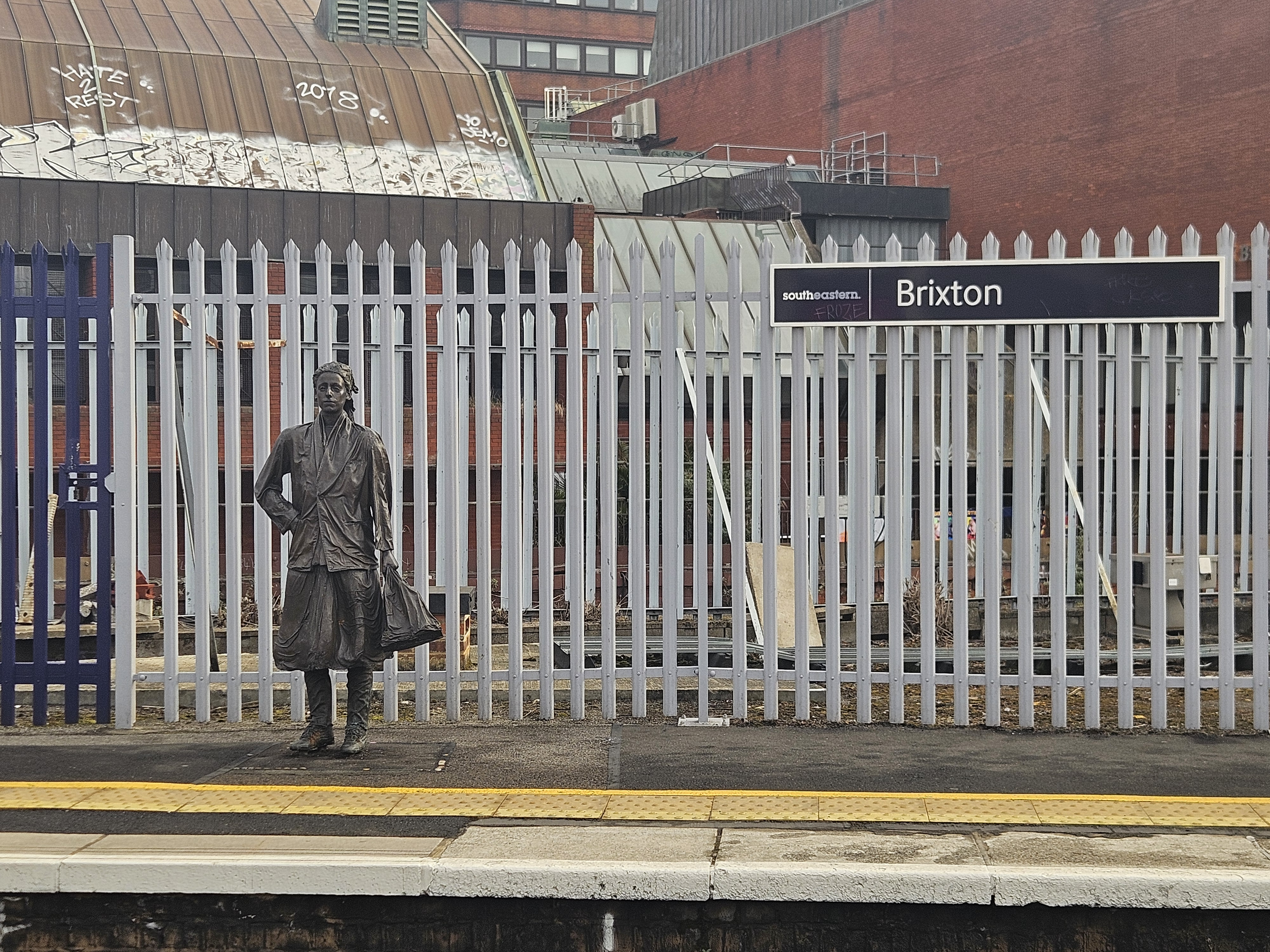
Karin Heisterman Statue on the platform Brixton Railway Station, part of Kevin Atherton's Platforms Piece. Photo: 2025

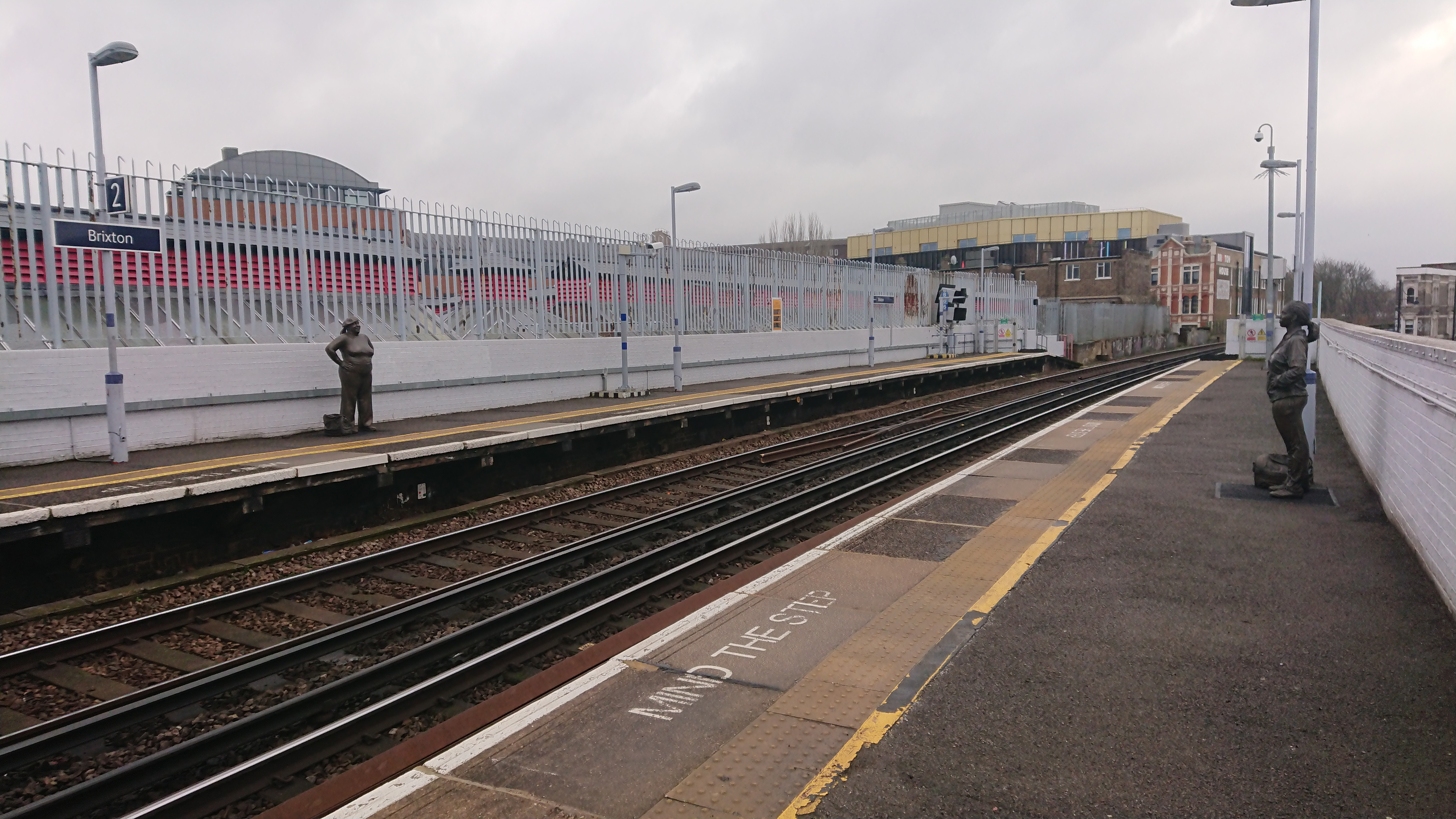
Joy Battick statues at Brixton Station; Left: Joy II (2022) Platform 2, Right: Joy Battick (1986) on Platform 1. 26 January 2023

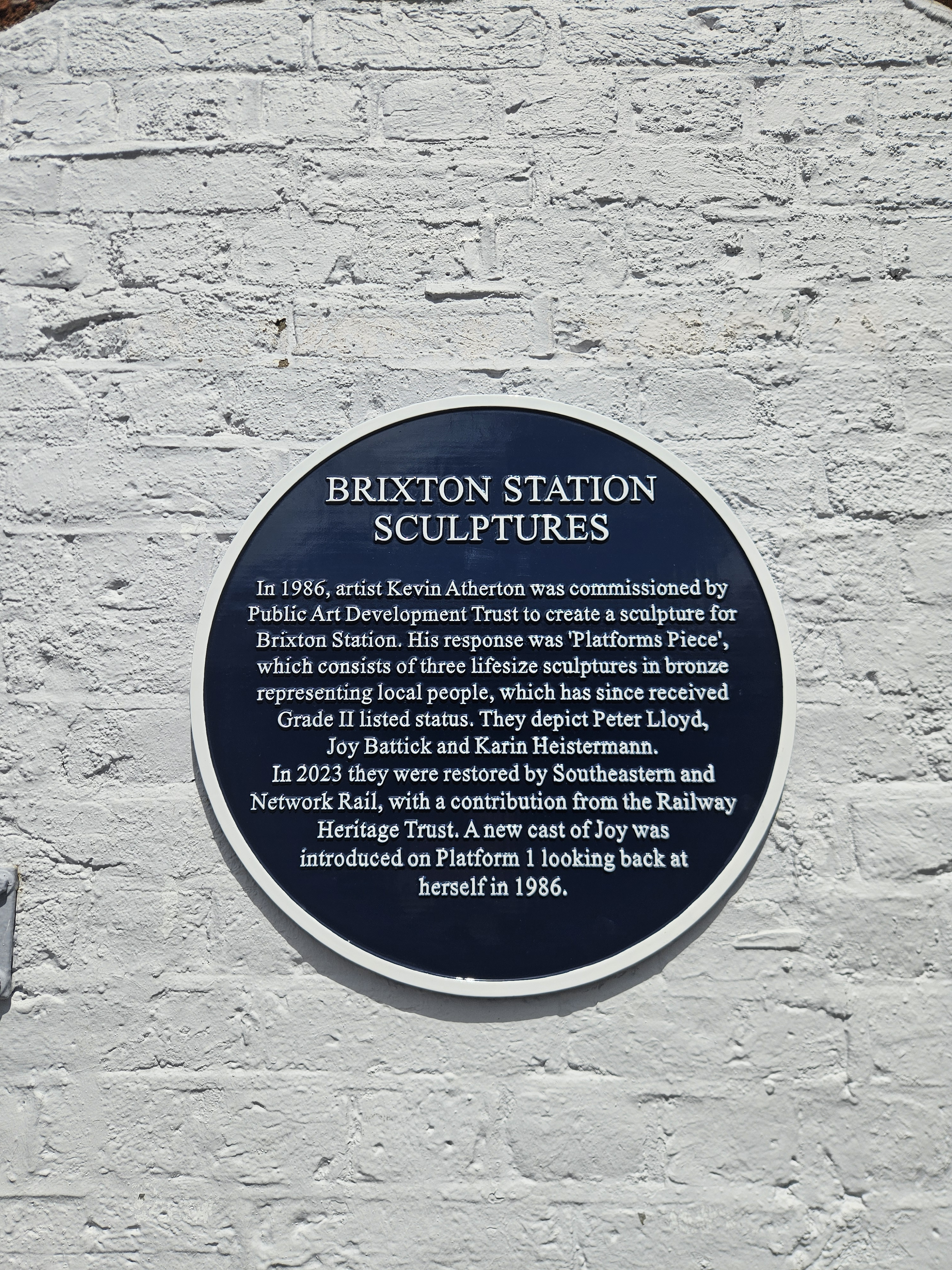
Plaque on the wall at Brixton National Rail Station explaining Kevin Athertons Platforms Piece sculptures

Platforms Piece consists of four bronze sculptures of commuters at Brixton railway station by the British artist Kevin Atherton. The original three sculptures were completed in 1986 with a fourth statue, Joy II, added in 2023.

== History ==
In 1985 the Public Art Development Trust suggested to British Rail that they commission a piece of art for Brixton railway station. The sculptures were part of the £1m Brixton Station Improvement Scheme, which was devised by the London Borough of Lambeth, British Rail, and the Department of the Environment.

Atherton, the artist, wanted his three figures to represent the real inhabitants of Brixton, and made sure to choose three models who had personal connections to Brixton: Peter Lloyd, Joy Battick and Karin Heistermann. At the time, Battick and Lloyd worked at the Brixton Recreation Centre, across the road, in the direction of which both of their statues were facing (Battick's has since moved).

Atherton made the bronze statues using the lost-wax casting process, having made plaster moulds of his three models in a disused ticket office on the station platform (converted into a studio for his use).

The sculptures were unveiled by Sir Hugh Casson, who had also been on the selection panel that chose Atherton's pitch for the job, on 30 June 1986, once the station had been renovated. Platforms Piece won the Association of Business Sponsorship of the Arts Industry Year award for the best commission in any medium in 1986.

In November 2016, Platforms Piece was given listed status by Historic England, which claimed that two of the figures were the first public sculptural representations of black British people in the UK. However, this claim is disputed due to the sculpted representation of George Ryan in a relief panel on the plinth of Nelson's Column in London, dating from the 1860s.

In 2016 the statues forming 'Platforms Piece' were temporarily removed for refurbishment and returned to the station in January 2023. At the same time, Joy Battick, one of the original models, was invited to model for a new statue, Joy II, to accompany the original statues. The two statues of Joy Battick face one another across the railway at the South end of the platforms. The statues of Karin Heistermann and Peter Lloyd face one another at the North end of the platforms.
