= Stephen Pusey =

American painter

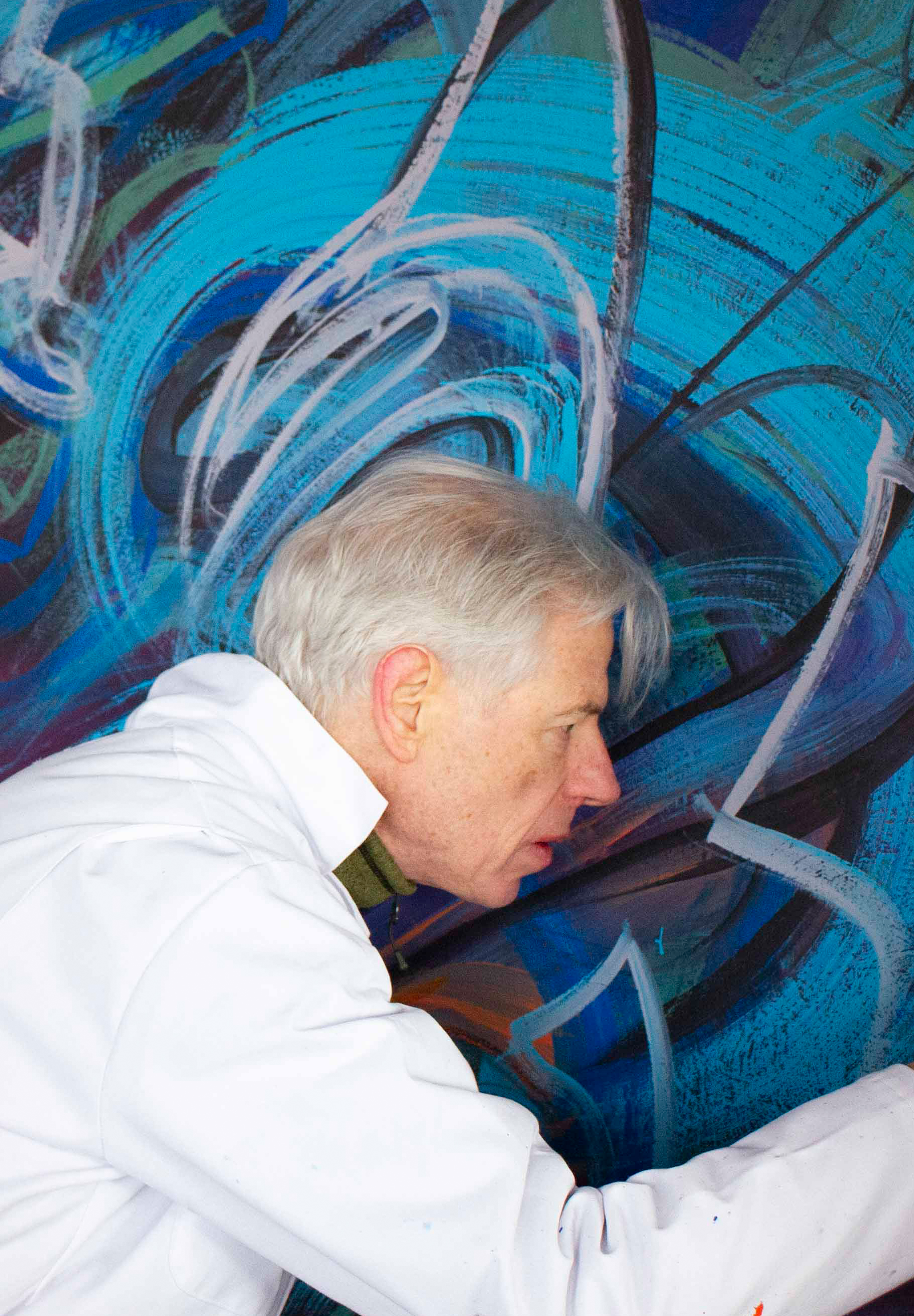
- 2019 Seoul, S. Korea
- Born: 24 June 1952 (age 74)
- Education: Saint Martins School of Art
- Known for: Painting

Stephen Pusey (born 1952) is a New York-based artist of Irish and British descent known for Abstract art and earlier work as a painter of figurative community murals in London, UK.

== Early life and education ==
Stephen Pusey was born on 24 June 1952 and studied painting at Saint Martins School of Art, London, UK from which he graduated in 1975.

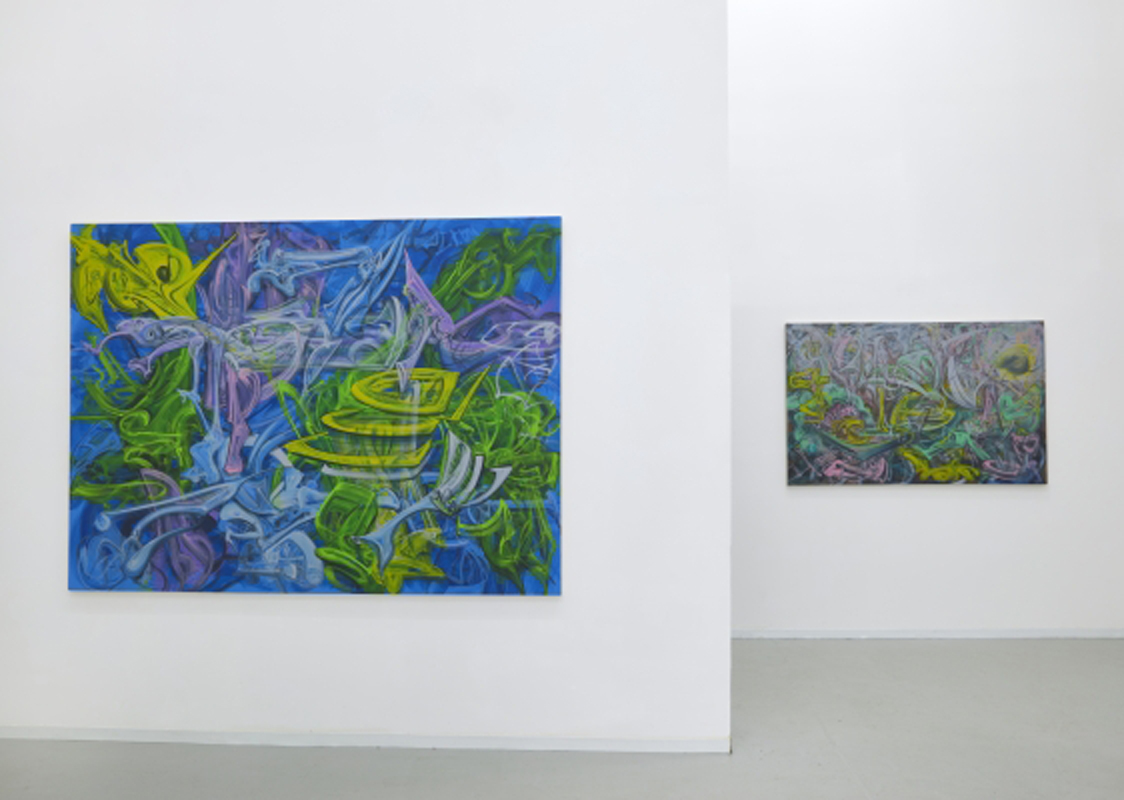
Artist: Stephen Pusey, Strange Attractors Exhibition New York City Date: 2021

== Career ==
From 1977 to 1982, Pusey painted large outdoor community murals on the exteriors of buildings, the most notable of which were the Covent Garden, Earlham Street mural, 1977 and the mural Children at Play on the Brixton Academy in 1982.

His debut solo exhibition in the USA was at P.S. 1 Contemporary Art Center in 1986, after which he moved permanently to New York City.

In the years that followed his work included experimentation with digital media and Net Art in addition to painting, drawing and sculpture that combined calligraphic gesture that veered from the figurative to Abstraction.

In 1994 he founded the online art and discussion hub, Plexus, with curator Yu Yeon Kim with whom he curated, "Omnizone, Perspectives in Mapping Digital Culture", in 1997 and was a founding member of the Foundation for Digital Culture in 1996.

Concurrent with his digital and network explorations, Pusey continued exhibiting his paintings in New York City and internationally. In describing an exhibition of the artist's paintings in 2008 Robert C. Morgan wrote, “Influenced by Borges’ sense of space, time and history, Pusey creates a labyrinthine stasis, embedding distant feelings of the universe that appear in the process of suspending opticality. Instead of a vibrating surface, these paintings suggest a woven space through an optical texture that defies finite properties.”

In 2019 the artist was commissioned by Seoul Metropolitan Government, South Korea to paint a five sectioned mural in the pavilion of the Oil Tank Culture Park, Mapo District (Mapo-Gu), Seoul. In a review of a solo exhibition of the artist's paintings in 2021, John Yau wrote, “Pusey constantly courts a chaotic mélange of marks but never descends into it. Rather, he respects each of the gestures he makes enough not to destroy them ... Pusey’s cursive marks sit in that zone where writing becomes drawing and vice versa.“
