= Brixton tube station =

London Underground station

Brixton
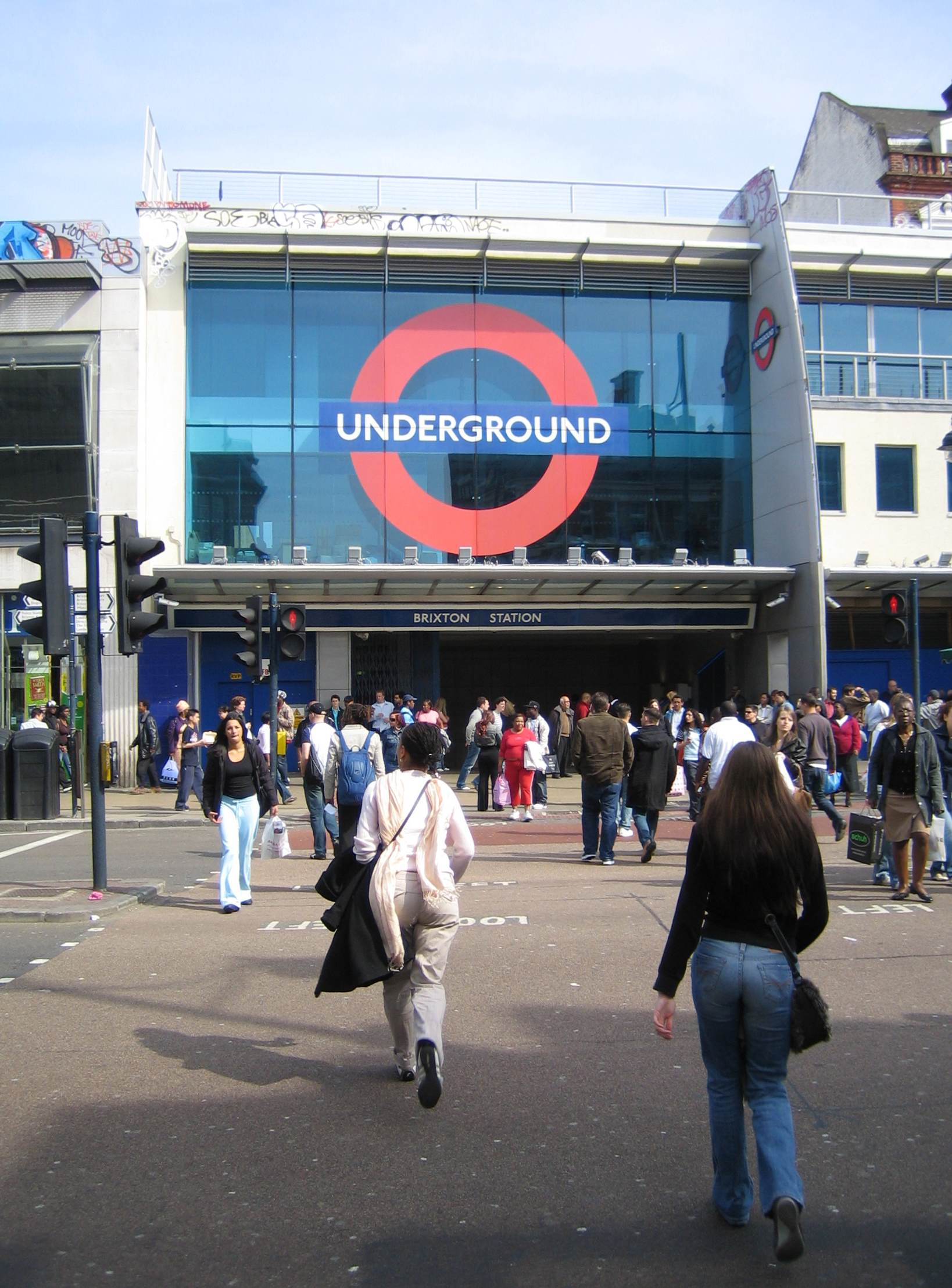
- Station entrance
- Interactive map of Brixton

General information
- Location: Brixton
- Local authority: London Borough of Lambeth
- Managed by: London Underground
- Number of platforms: 2
- Accessible: Yes
- Fare zone: 2
- OSI: Brixton

London Underground annual entry and exit
- 2020: ▼12.74 million
- 2021: ▲12.83 million
- 2022: ▲21.32 million
- 2023: ▼20.17 million
- 2024: ▲21.39 million

Key dates
- 23 July 1971: Opened (Victoria line)

Other information
- External links: TfL station info page
- Coordinates: 51.4626°N 0.1149°W

Brixton is a London Underground station, located on Brixton Road in Brixton in the London Borough of Lambeth, south London. The station, which is in London fare zone 2, is the southern terminus of the Victoria line and the next station towards north is Stockwell. It is known to have the largest London Underground roundel on the network.

== History ==
The City and Brixton Railway had planned to link Brixton with Central London by underground railway in 1897 but was unable to raise funds for construction.

Brixton station on the Victoria line was opened on 23 July 1971 by the London Transport Executive. It has high usage for an inner suburban station with 33.46 million entries and exits during 2016 making it the 19th busiest station by this measure.

In the 2000s, the station was extensively refurbished and upgraded, with a new external façade and entrance lobby, installation of step-free access, together with refurbishment of a number of smaller retail outlets and the ticket office. The refurbishment started in 2001, step-free access work was completed in 2005, and the station upgrade was completed in 2010. The station was briefly closed for asbestos removal in 2006. The refurbishment works were a long drawn out process. New panels and lighting have been installed in the escalator shaft.

== Design ==
From the ticket hall, three escalators take passengers to and from the platforms. There are also passenger lifts between street level, the ticket hall and the platforms to provide step free access. The station is laid out as a two-track terminus with a scissors crossover north of the station, and the line continues for a short distance south of the station platforms to form a pair of sidings.

The 'Underground' logo, or otherwise known 'roundel' on the façade of the station building is the largest on the London Underground network

=== Artwork ===
As with all Victoria line stations, the platforms feature tiled murals in the seat recesses – the work at Brixton by Hans Unger is a pun on the station name, suggesting a "ton of bricks". Since 2018, Art on the Underground has used the header wall above the main staircase to the ticket hall for temporary murals, by artists such as Njideka Akunyili Crosby, Shanti Panchal and Joy Labinjo. Artists are asked to consider the diverse local community, and as well as reflect the various Brixton murals painted in the local area in the 1980s.

== Location ==
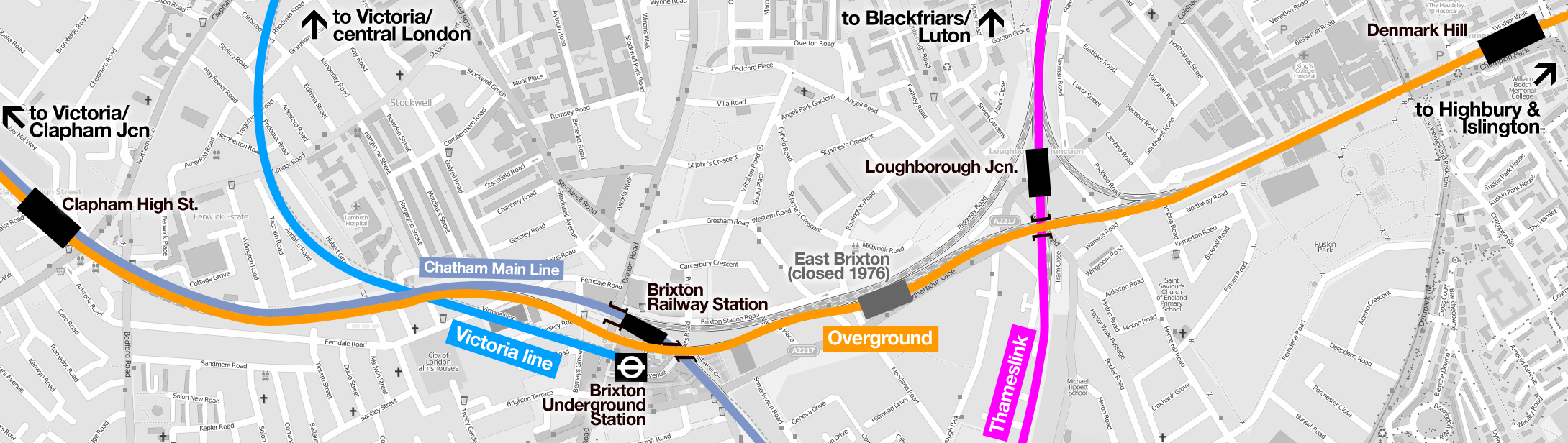
Map of rail & tube lines passing through Brixton, showing the location of East Brixton

The station is in Brixton Road and is about 100 m from Brixton railway station (on the London Victoria to Orpington line, operated by South Eastern). Although the route of the London Overground South London line also runs close to Brixton tube station, there is no station in Brixton on this route because it passes overhead on high railway arches.

== Services ==
Brixton station is the southern terminus of the Victoria line in London fare zone 2. The next station is Stockwell to the north. Train frequencies vary throughout the day, but generally every 3–5 minutes between 05:55 and 00:18.

Preceding station	London Underground	Following station
Terminus	Victoria line	Stockwell towards Walthamstow Central

== Connections ==
Various day and nighttime London Bus routes serve the station.

== Bibliography ==
- Butt, R. V. J. (October 1995). The Directory of Railway Stations: details every public and private passenger station, halt, platform and stopping place, past and present (1st ed.). Sparkford: Patrick Stephens Ltd. ISBN 978-1-85260-508-7. OCLC 60251199. OL 11956311M.
