= Children at Play =

Mural by Stephen Pusey in London, England

Coordinates: 51.465882°N 0.114776°W

Children at Play is a mural at the rear of the Brixton Academy on Stockwell Park Walk in Brixton. Children at Play was commissioned by Lambeth Council in the wake of the 1981 Brixton riot, it was painted between 1981 and 1982 by Stephen Pusey. The mural is intended to display 'racial harmony between Lambeth's schoolchildren'. Pusey and a council employee searched the area before finding the site, which was then the disused Astoria cinema. The mural is highly visible to residents of the Stockwell Park Estate, who were consulted as to the final design for the mural. The initial designs for the mural reflected the tensions and struggles of the people of Brixton, but these were subsequently perceived as an unwanted negative perception of the area. The final image was chosen to reflect harmony between the different races of the area.

The mural has been nicknamed the 'Zombie Children' by local people. The creation of the mural was funded by the Inner City Partnership Fund, Commission for Racial Equality, Greater London Arts, Marks & Spencer, Rank Leisure Services, and Shell International limited. A plaque underneath the mural commemorates the donors. The mural cost £23,000 (equivalent to £82,005 in 2025). It was unveiled in November 1982 by the Mayor of Lambeth, Hugh Chambers.

The mural is 32 meters by 9 meters in size and was painted with Keim Silicate paint, with an expected 100-year lifespan. It was restored in 2011 by artist Paul Butler and Triton Building Conservation with the assistance of the London Mural Preservation Society.

== See also ==
- Brixton murals
