= Kevin Atherton =

British artist (born 1950)

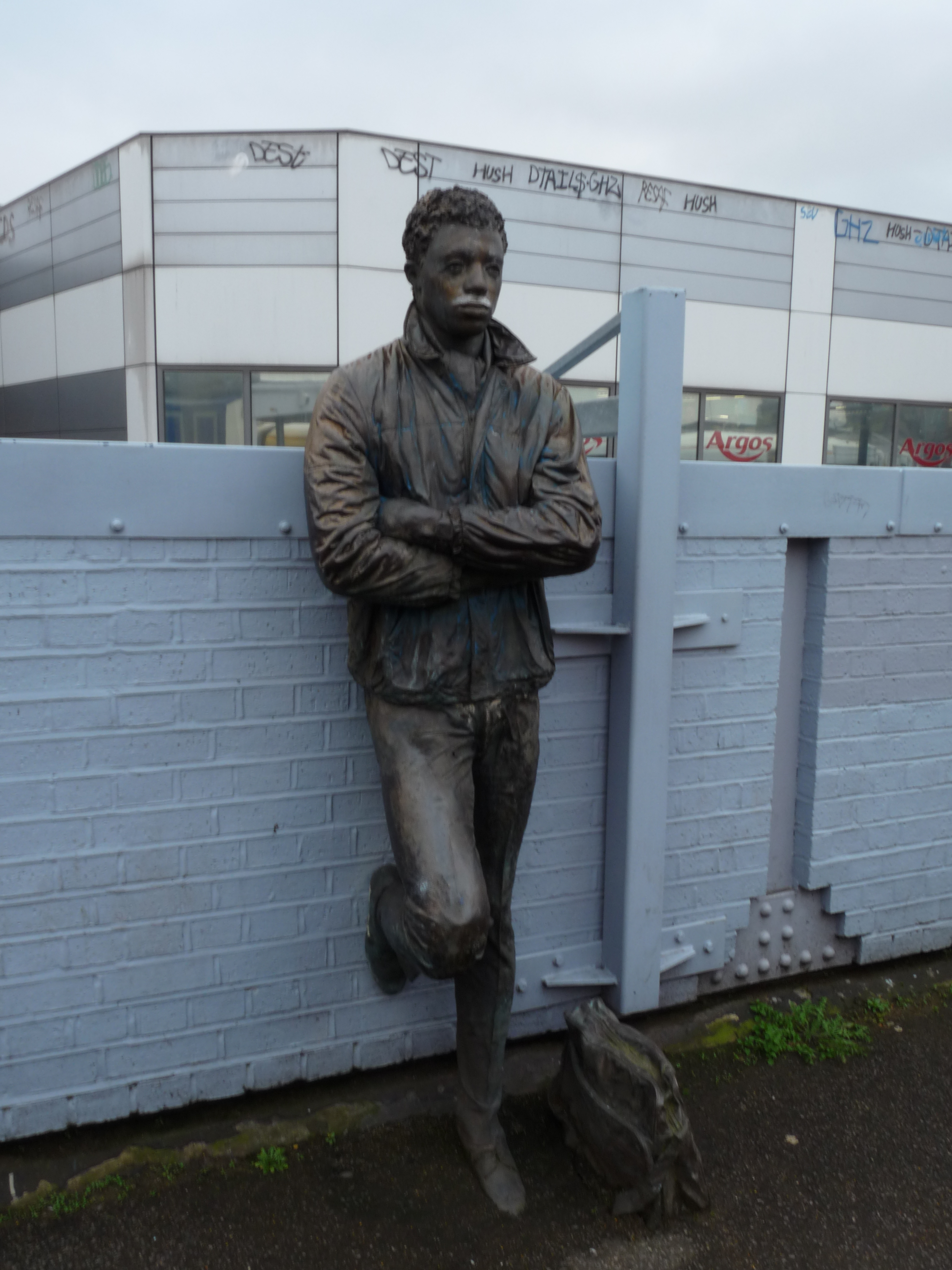
Platforms Piece, Brixton station, 2011

Kevin Atherton (born 1950) is a Manx artist who holds Irish citizenship. After twenty years of living and working in Ireland he is now based in Hastings on the south coast of England. His practice includes performance, sculpture, film and video, installation and site-specific public art.

== Early life and education ==
Atherton (mother's maiden name: Clague) was born in Douglas, Isle of Man in 1950. Atherton is proud to be Manx but also to hold Irish citizenship. Educated at the Isle of Man College of Art-now University College Isle of Man from 1968 to 1969, and at the Fine Art Department of Leeds Polytechnic from 1969 to 1972. In 2009 Atherton completed his PhD in the Visual Culture Faculty at the National College of Art and Design in Dublin (NCAD) a chapter of which was published in 2012 by FLOOD (Ire) as the book Auto-Interview. Atherton's mother Elizabeth (née Clague) was a tailor and furrier and his father William a postman. Raised as a Roman Catholic Atherton is an atheist and a socialist.

== Career ==
After living and working in Dublin and in Inistioge in Co Kilkenny Atherton returned to live in the UK in 2020 having originally moved to Dublin with his late wife (married in Worcestershire 1977), the educationalist Vicky Robinson (1950–2005)in 1999. Atherton lived and worked in London from 1975 - 1999, teaching part-time at The Slade School of Fine Art (UCL), the Royal College of Art and Middlesex Polytechnic having first been an invigilator at the Whitechapel Gallery for five years. Most notably he was the Head of Department of Alternative Media at Chelsea College of Art, which later; when it merged with Print Making, then under the leadership of Jeff Edwards, became Combined Media. Arriving in Dublin in 1999 Atherton, as the inaugural Head of the Fine Art Media Department at the National College of Art and Design (NCAD), wrote the BA Fine Art Media pathway and the ground-breaking Virtual Realities MA course. He has exhibited and performed throughout the world including at the Museum of Modern Art San Francisco (SFMOMA), The Museum of Modern Art Vienna (MUMOK) and at Tate Britain. His two-screen video installation In Two Minds (1978-2014) is in the collection of the Irish Museum of Modern Art Dublin.

Iron Horses (1987), 12 black metal silhouette horse sculptures positioned intermittently alongside the Stour Valley railway line, was commissioned by British Rail and West Midlands Arts.

Atherton had a one-man show at London's Serpentine Gallery from March to May 1988.

In 1992, Atherton's statue The Compleat Angler was erected on Chocolate Island, in the River Kennet where that river once flowed through the Huntley & Palmers factory in Reading. It is intended to commemorate the people of Reading who worked in the factory.

In November 2016, his artwork Platforms Piece, comprising three bronze sculptures of commuters on the platforms of Brixton railway station, was given listed status by Historic England. It was commissioned by British Rail in 1986, and two of the figures are believed to be the "first public sculptural representations of black British people in the UK".
