= Oil Tank Culture Park =

Ecological Park in Seoul, South Korea

- 문화비축기지
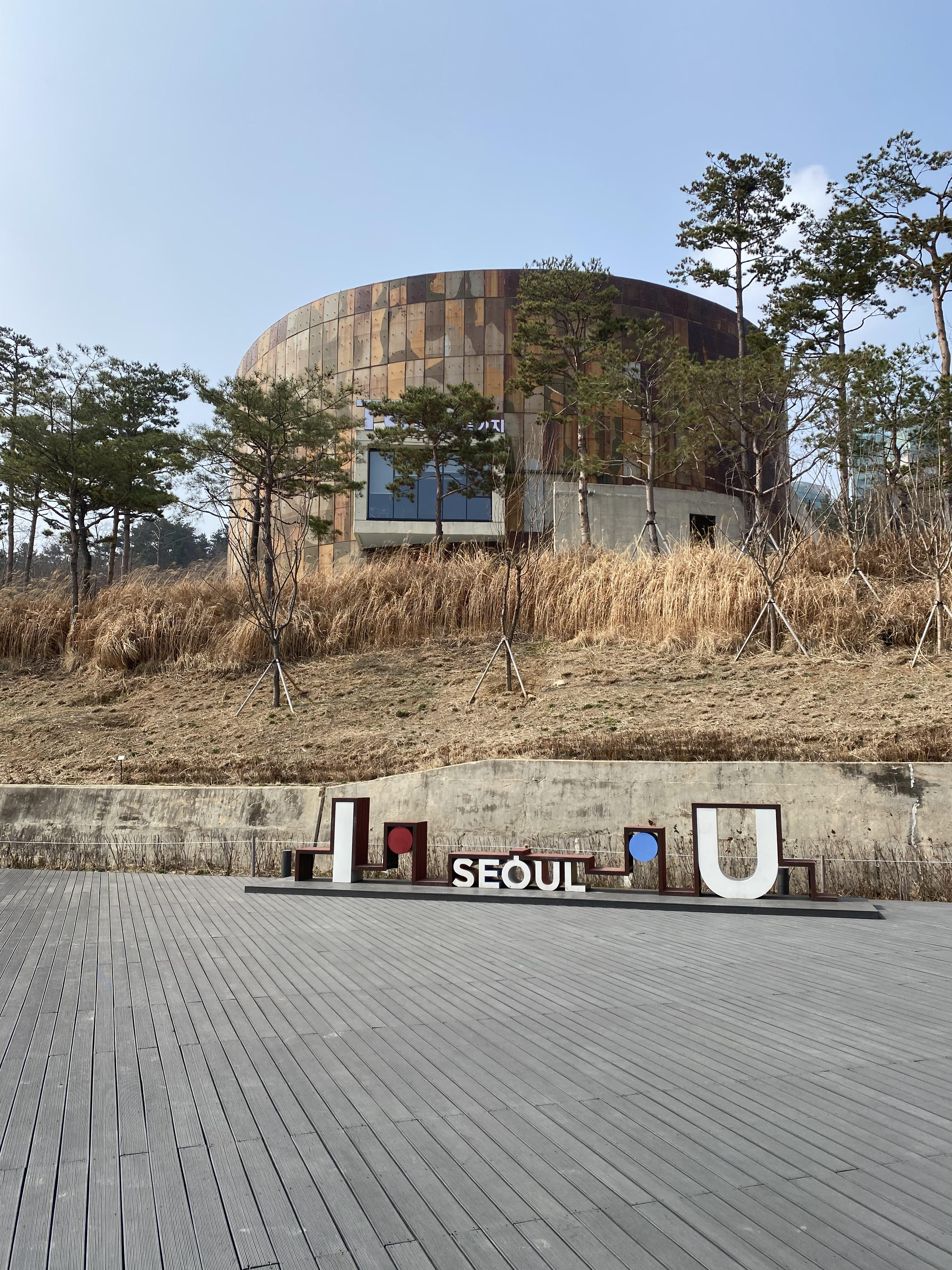
- Interactive map of Oil Tank Culture Park
- Motto: "From Oil To Culture"
- Location: 03914 87, Jeungsan-ro, Mapo, Seoul
- Coordinates: 37°34′15″N 126°53′39″E
- Administrator: Seoul Metropolitan Government
- Open: Exhibition Halls close on Mondays

The Oil Tank Culture Park (Korean: 문화비축기지; Hanja: 文化備蓄基地) is a renovated public park located in Mapo, Seoul, South Korea.

== Overview ==
The Oil Tank Culture Park is a cultural complex located in west Seoul, in the vicinity of the World Cup Stadium. The space, which previously was an oil storage facility, has been renovated into an environmentally-conscious park that holds a number of exhibitions and cultural events along the year. The oil reservoir tanks remains on the site and they have been transformed into performance venues, learning spaces and exhibitions halls.

The six tanks that conformed the complex have been transformed into the following installations: the Culture Yard, the Glass Pavilion, the Stage, the Tank Type, the Culture Complex, the Story Hall and the Community Center.

== History ==
The park was originally an oil storage facility constructed in 1976 in response to the oil crisis of 1973. Six tanks were installed at the foot of Maebongsan mountain to prepare for emergency situations. They were filled with 69.0 million liters of oil, enough to be consumed by the citizens of Seoul for a month. However, it was classified as a hazardous facility when the constructions for the World Cup Stadium began and was permanently closed in 2000, before the World Cup took place in Seoul in 2002.

In 2013, the Seoul Metropolitan Government led a renewal project to transform the place into an eco-friendly culture complex and held an international design contest where various architectural firms participated. The winning design plan was "Petro: Reading the Story of the Site" by RoA Architects.

== Facilities ==
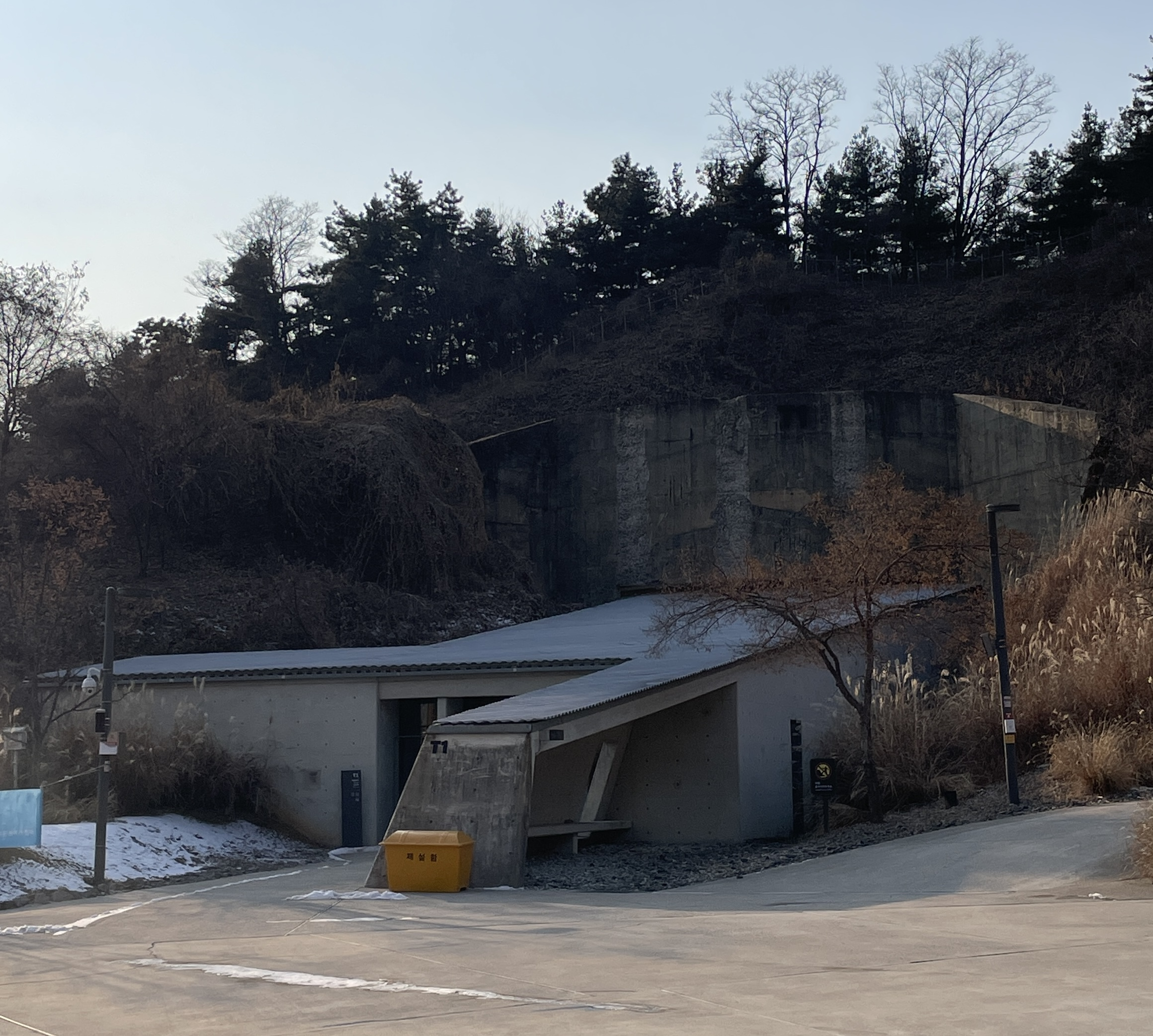
T1 (Glass Pavilion)

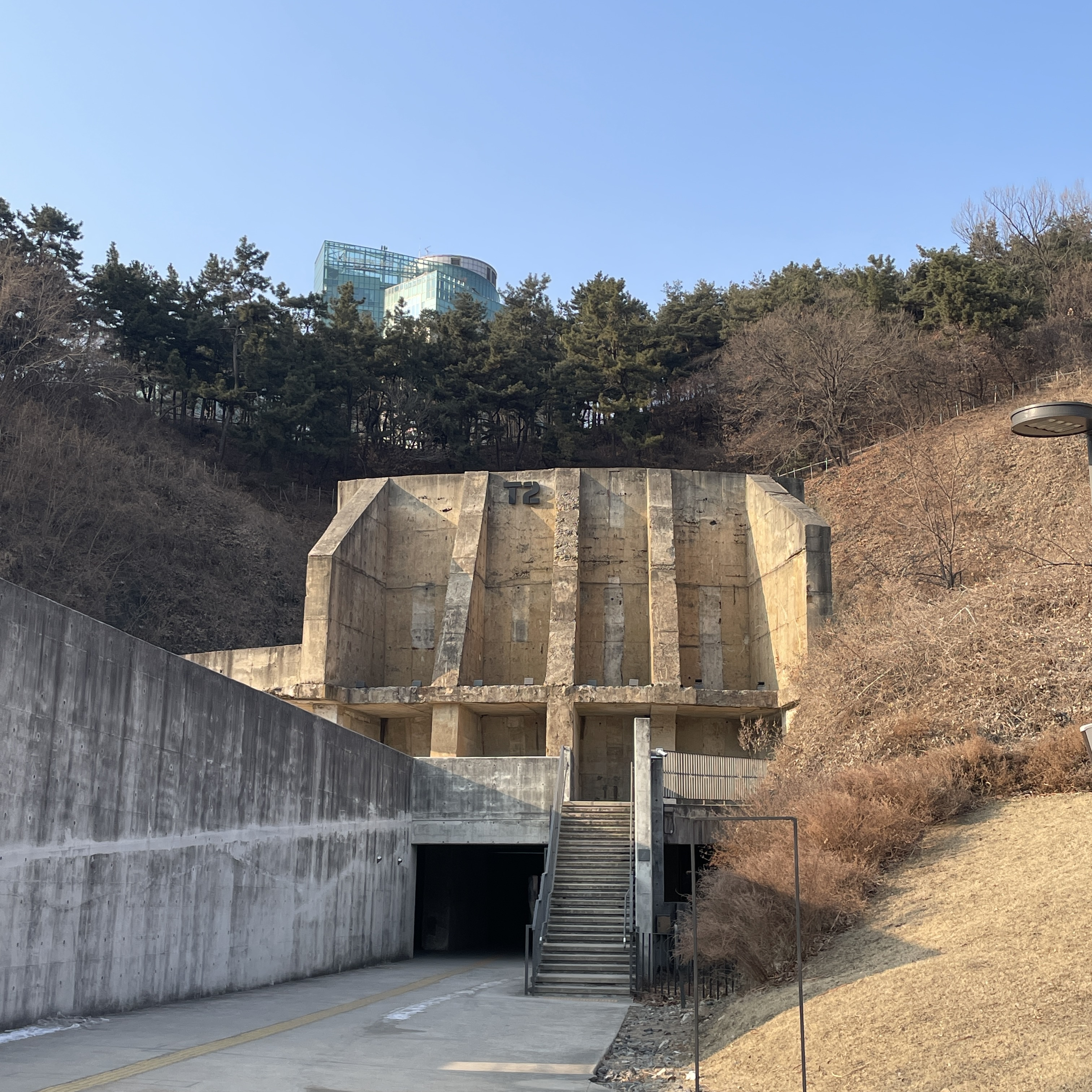
T2 (Stage)

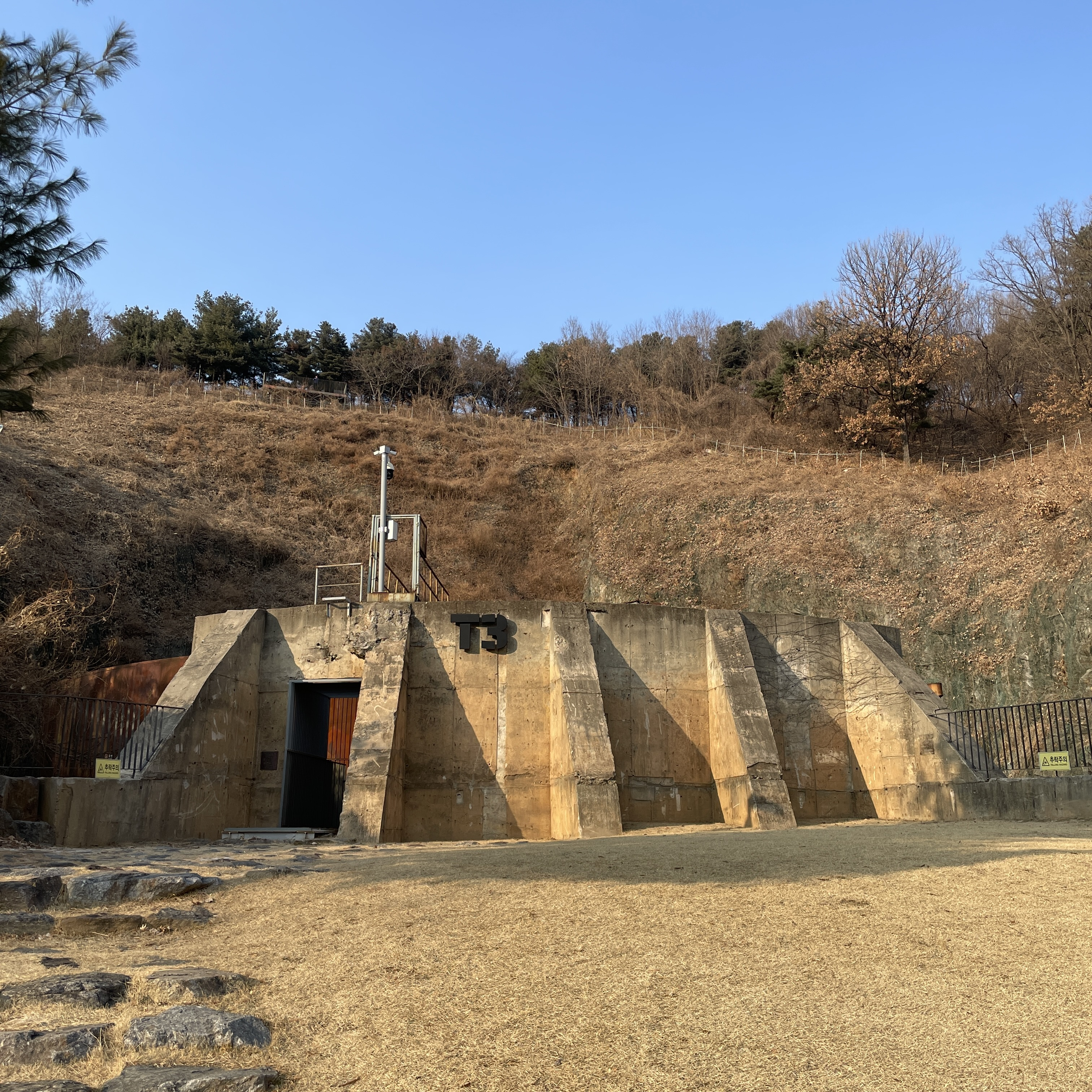
T3 (Sustained Oil Tank)

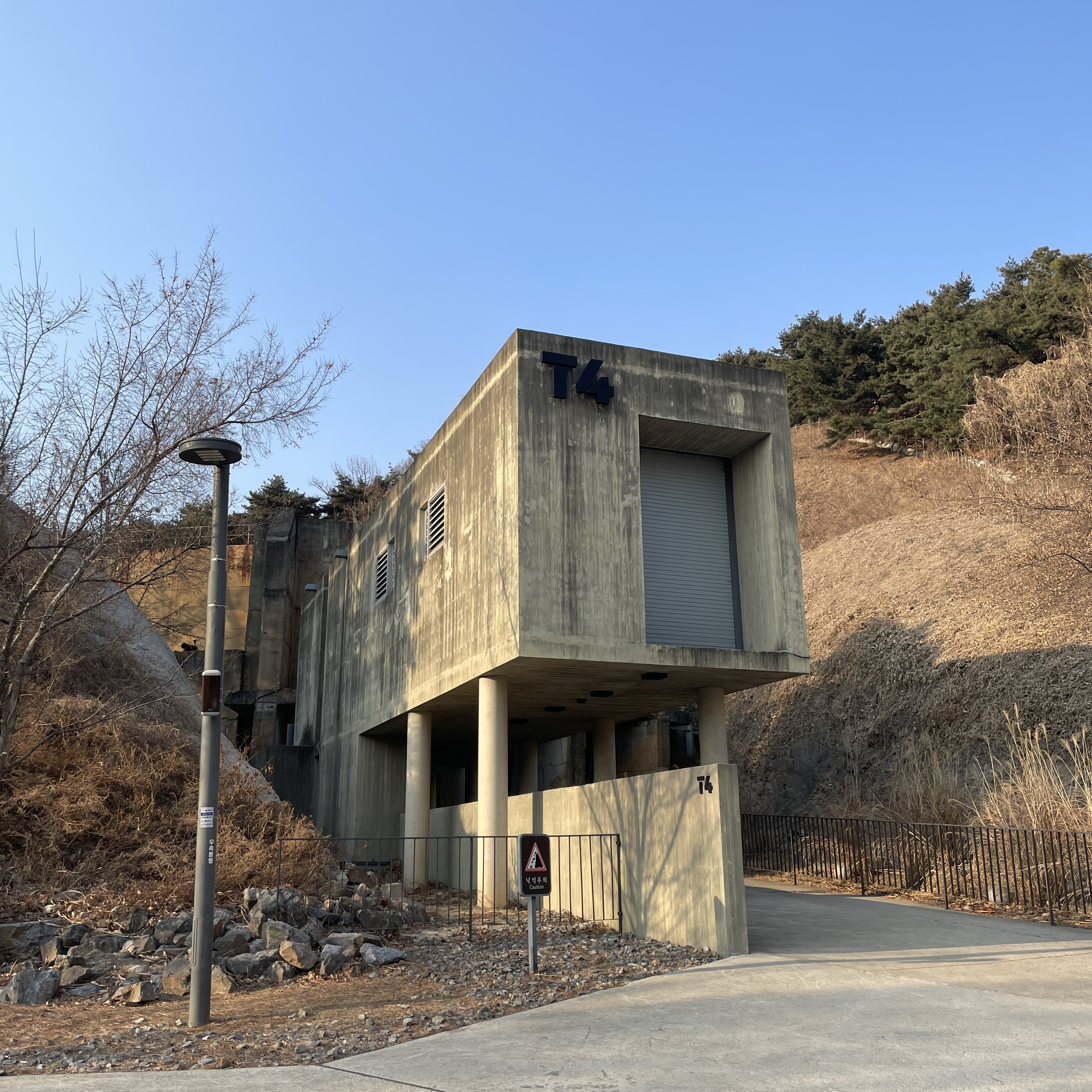
T4 (Culture Complex)

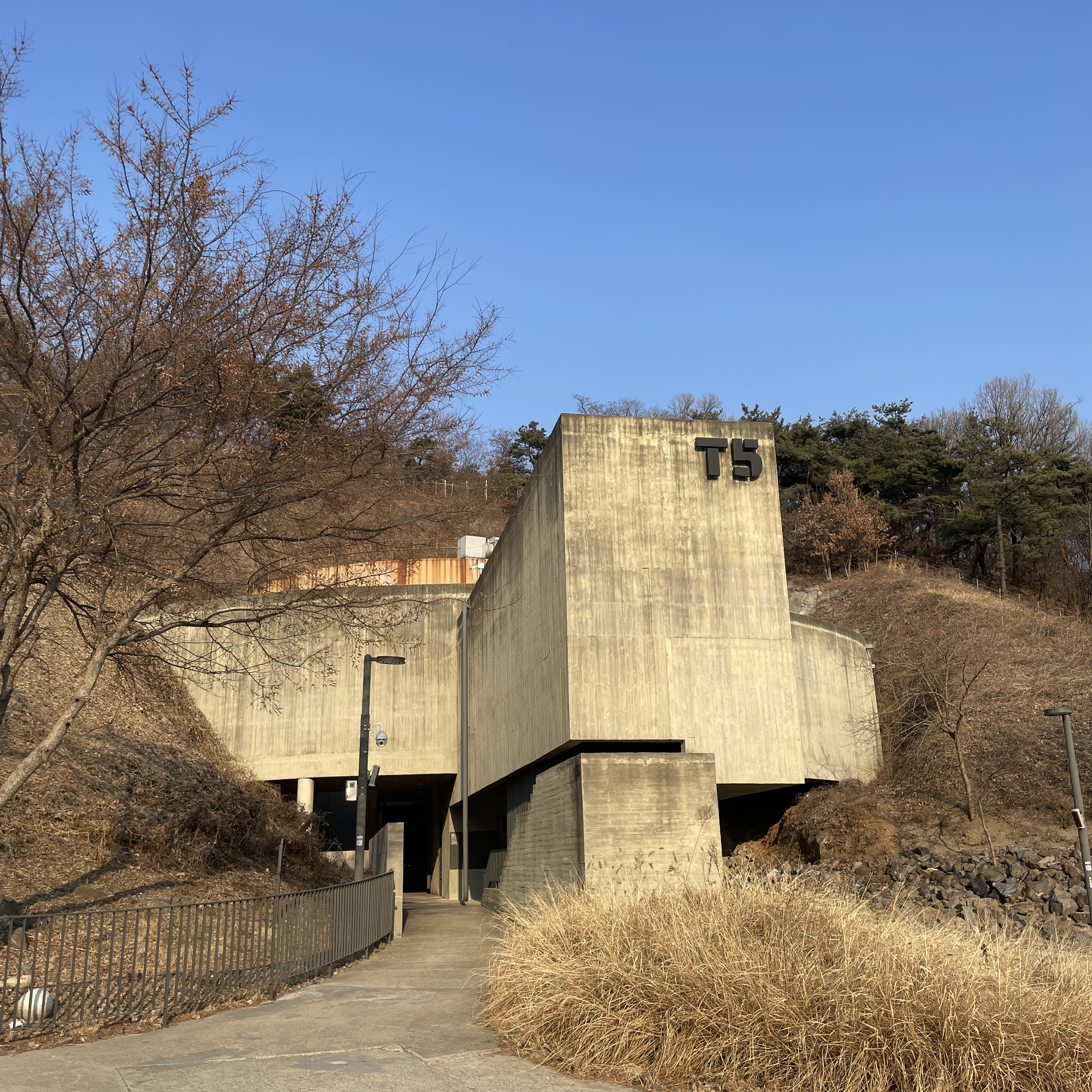
T5 (Story Hall)

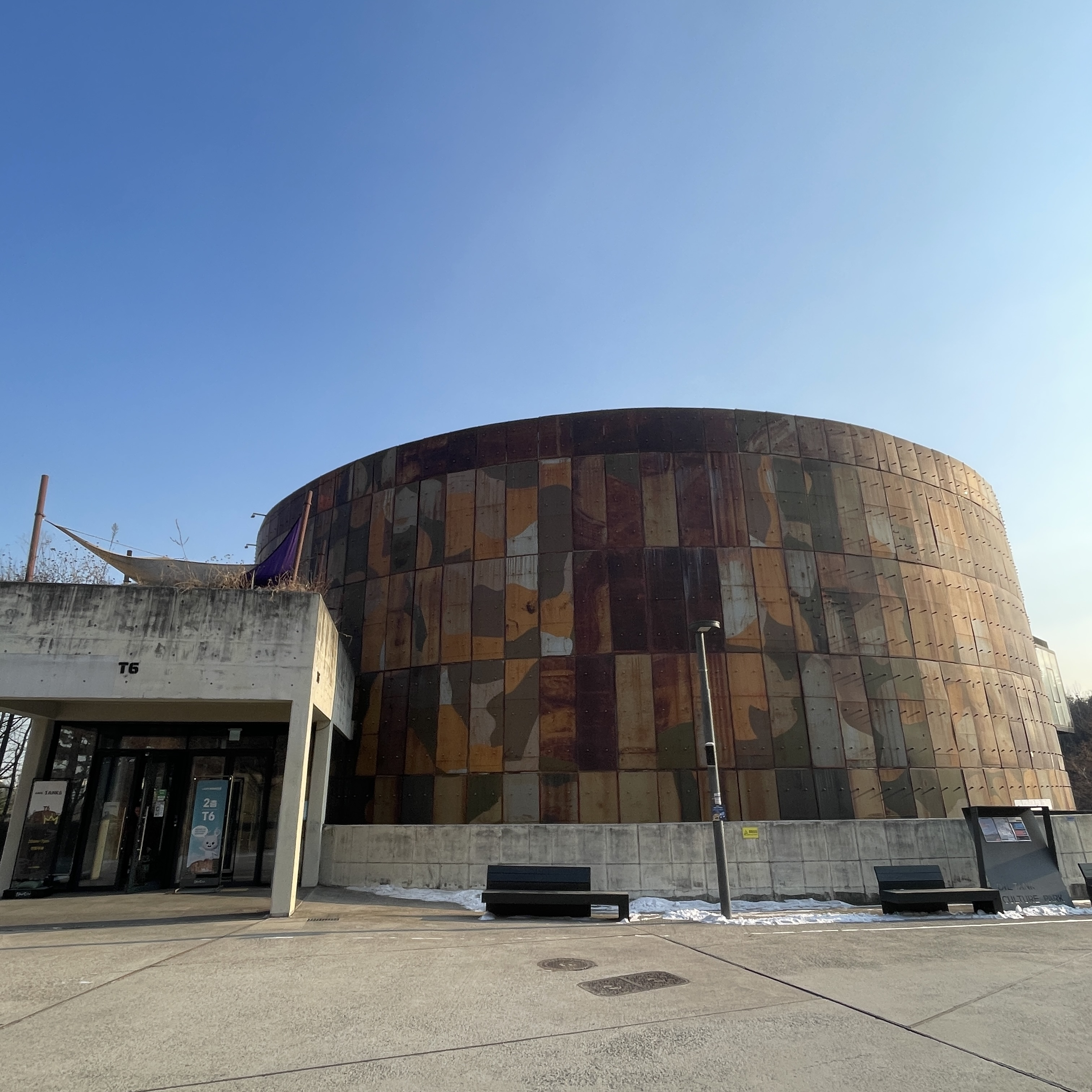
T6 (Community Center)
- T1 (Glass Pavilion): A multi-purpose space for exhibitions, workshop and artistic performances.
- T2 (Stage): Indoor/outdoor performance hall.
- T3 (Sustained Oil Tank): preserved tank that allow visitors to see the historic background of the place.
- T4 (Culture Complex): A cultural space for performances, exhibitions and experiential programs.
- T5 (Story Hall): Museum that display the transformation process from the oil reserve to the cultural park.
- T6 (Community Center): Contains a laboratory, a cafeteria, a conference room and a small eco-library.
- Culture Yard: An outdoor space where large-scale performances, festival and markets take place.

== Events ==
Events that have taken place at the Oil Tank Culture Park:

- Seoul Fashion Week (2021)
- Seoul Gourmet Week (2021)
- Seoul International Dance Festival (2021)
- Seoul Circus Festival (2020)

== See also ==
- Seonyeudo
- Digital Media City
- World Cup Park
