= Shanti Panchal =

Indian-British artist

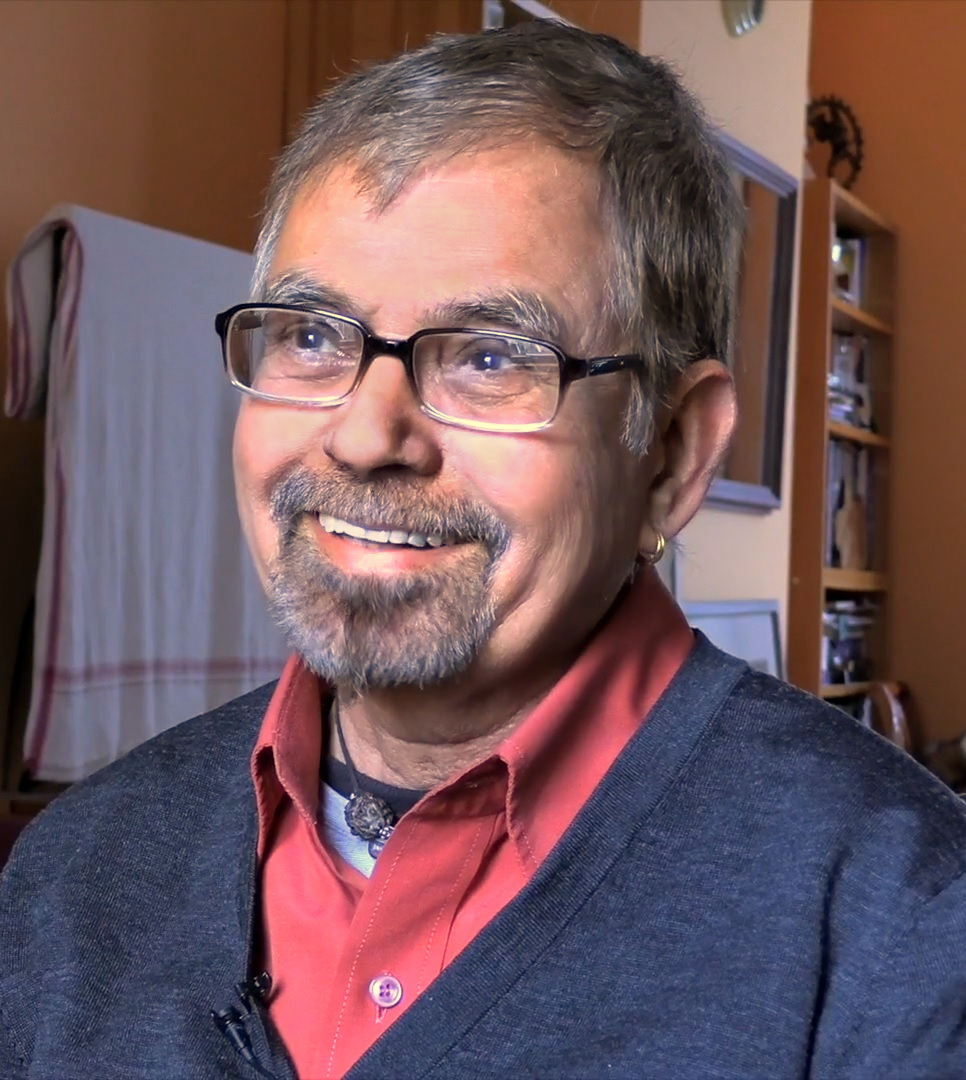
Shanti Panchal 2022

Shanti Panchal (born 1951) is an Indian-British artist.

== Life ==
Shanti Panchal was born in Mesar, a village in Gujarat, and studied at the Sir Jamsetjee Jeejebhoy School of Art in Bombay. He took part in several exhibitions in India, before moving to the United Kingdom in 1978, the recipient of a British Council Scholarship to study at the Byam Shaw School of Art. Since that time he has lived in London.

The India High Commission invited Panchal to restore damaged murals. He also took part in several group exhibitions before becoming involved in the black art movement in the mid-1980s. In 1984 the Greater London Council held an Anti-Racist year, and commissioned four murals in sites linked to black and Asian British populations. Panchal and the young artist Dushka Ahman were provided with a permanent mural site, but local community consultations rejected their initial proposals as too radical.

Panchal has been artist-in-residence at the British Museum, the Harris Museum in Preston and the Winsor & Newton Art Factory in London.

In 2015, Shanti Panchal won the third biennial self-portrait prize.

In 2016 Panchal criticised the artist Anish Kapoor for claiming a monopoly on the artistic use of the material Vantablack.

In August 2020 Panchal and Rachel Dickson co-curated 'Midnight's Family: 70 Years of Indian Artists in Britain', a virtual exhibition at the Ben Uri Gallery & Museum.

Panchal is an Honorary Member of the Royal Society of British Artists.
