= Brixton railway station =

National Rail station in London, England

Brixton
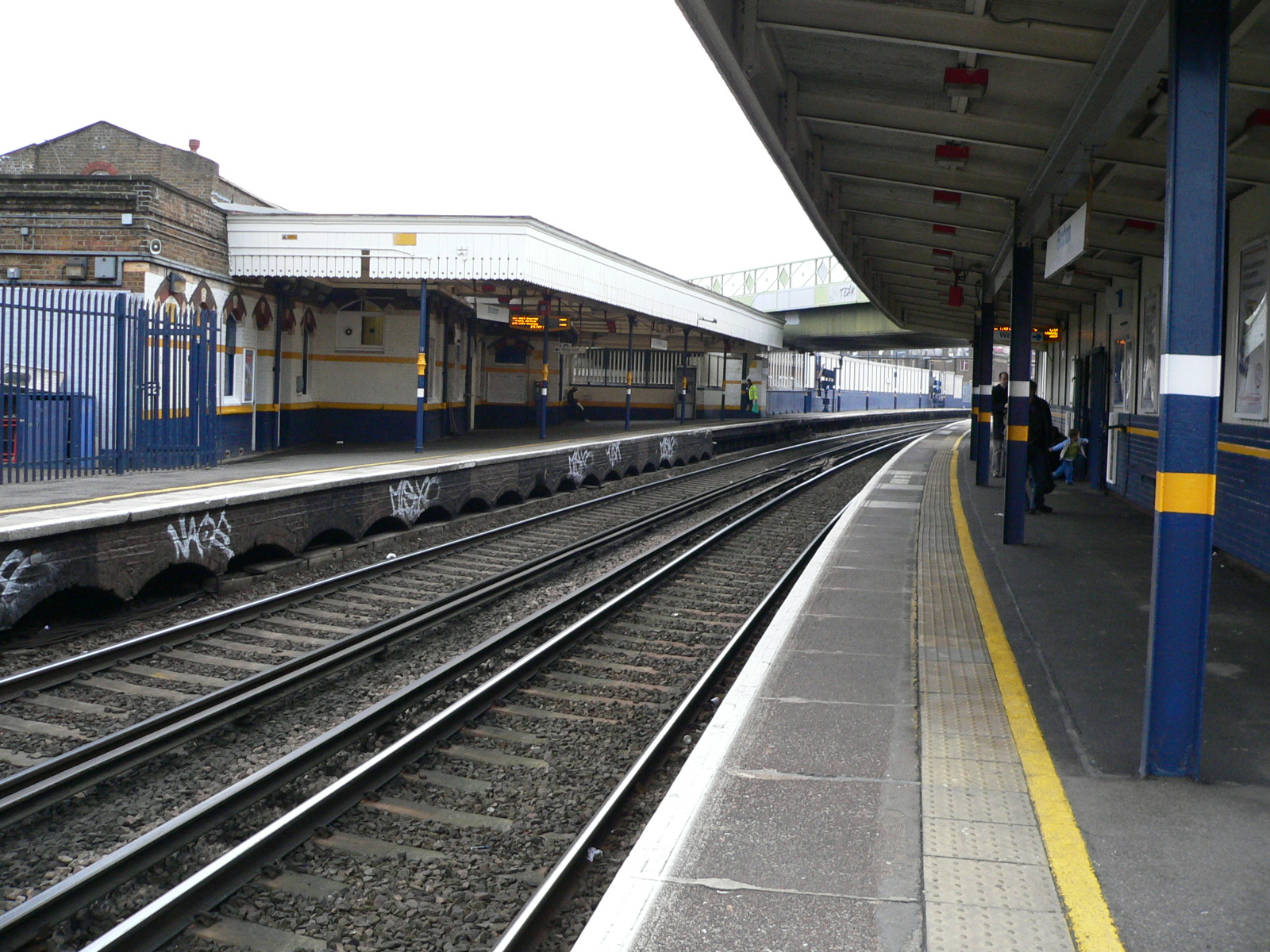
- Interactive map of Brixton

General information
- Location: Brixton
- Local authority: London Borough of Lambeth
- Managed by: Southeastern
- Station code: BRX
- DfT category: E
- Number of platforms: 2
- Fare zone: 2
- OSI: Brixton

National Rail annual entry and exit
- 2020–21: ▼0.299 million
- 2021–22: ▲0.646 million
- 2022–23: ▲0.704 million
- 2023–24: ▲0.782 million
- 2024–25: ▲0.804 million

Railway companies
- Original company: London, Chatham and Dover Railway
- Pre-grouping: London, Chatham and Dover Railway
- Post-grouping: Southern Railway

Key dates
- 25 August 1862: Opened

Other information
- External links: Departures; Facilities
- Coordinates: 51.4629°N 0.1132°W

Brixton railway station is a commuter railway station in Brixton, South London, UK. It is on the Chatham Main Line, 3 miles 14 chains (5.1 km) down the line from London Victoria. Trains are operated by Southeastern. The typical service is one train every 15 minutes in both directions, from Victoria to Orpington via Bromley South.

It is about 110 yards (100 m) north of Brixton Underground station, high above ground level on a railway bridge that can be seen from the tube station. Access is from Atlantic Road via staircases. It is also a busy junction, with the Catford Loop via Peckham Rye and Bellingham leaving the Chatham Main Line immediately west of the station, though there are currently only platforms on the Chatham Main Line. The South London line crosses above the east end of the platforms, without stopping nearby.

== History ==
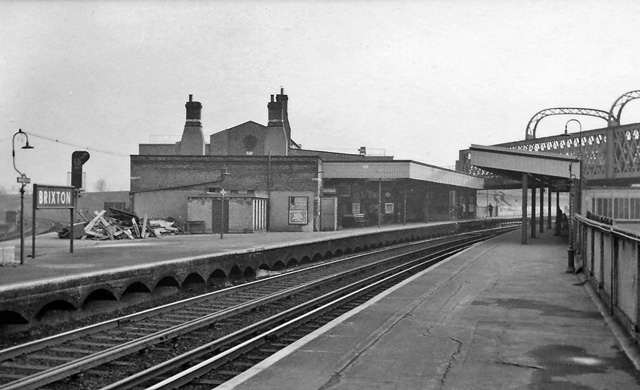
Brixton main line station in 1960

Brixton was opened as Brixton and South Stockwell on 25 August 1862 by the London, Chatham and Dover Railway (LCDR) to serve the affluent Victorian suburbs of South London. The initial service ran between Victoria and Herne Hill. Service was extended to a temporary terminus at Elephant and Castle on 6 October 1862 via a reversing move at Herne Hill. From 1 May 1863 services ran directly from Brixton to Camberwell via a curve at Loughborough Junction. Services were extended from Elephant and Castle to Blackfriars on 1 June 1894.

Services ran from Moorgate to London Victoria via Snow Hill (Holborn Viaduct), Camberwell New Road and Brixton and South Stockwell to Grosvenor Road, following the opening of the link northeastwards to London Blackfriars via Loughborough Junction in 1864. The station was also connected to the LC&DR's branch to Crystal Palace High Level via Nunhead soon afterwards, with this section (via Denmark Hill) becoming part of the modern-day Catford Loop Line.

The station is currently served only by trains on the main line towards Herne Hill. The Denmark Hill line platforms were closed in April 1916 as a wartime economy measure and have been demolished except for a short section of the up platform. However, the line itself remains in regular and frequent use by both freight and passenger services.

== Services ==
All services at Brixton are operated by Southeastern using Class 465 and 466 EMUs.

The typical off-peak service in trains per hour is:

- 4 tph to London Victoria
- 4 tph to Orpington via Bromley South

On weekends, the service is reduced to two trains per hour in each direction.

Preceding station	National Rail	Following station
London Victoria	Southeastern Bromley South Line	Herne Hill
	Historical railways	
Clapham High Street Line and station open	London, Chatham and Dover Railway City Branch	Loughborough Junction Line open, platforms closed
Clapham High Street Line and station open	London, Chatham and Dover Railway Catford Loop Line	Denmark Hill Line and station open

== Future Proposals ==
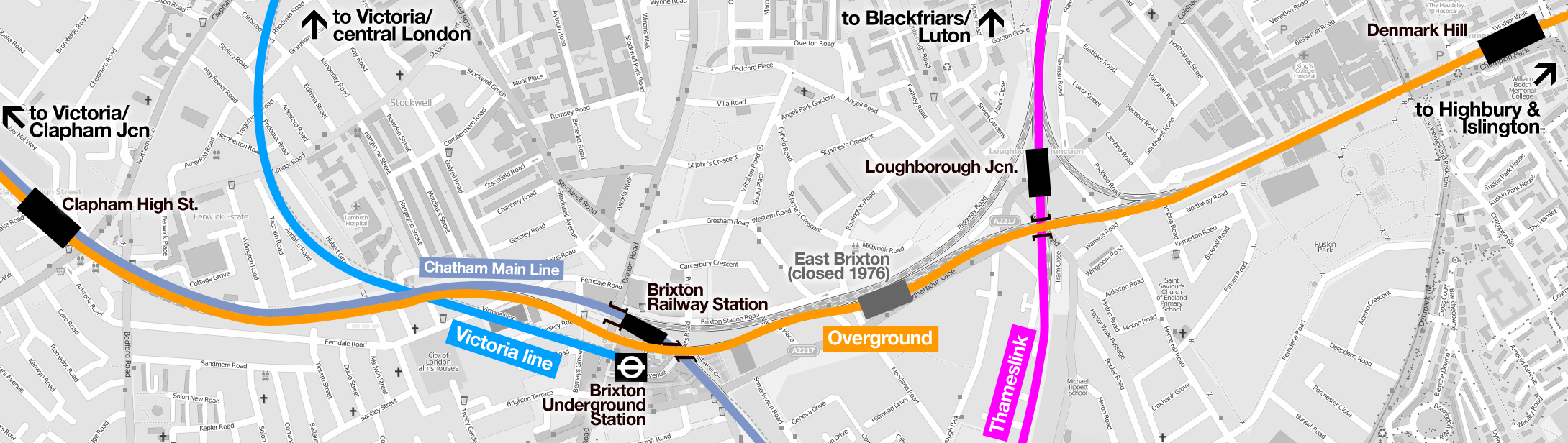
Map of rail & tube lines passing through Brixton, showing the location of Brixton station and the London Overground through route

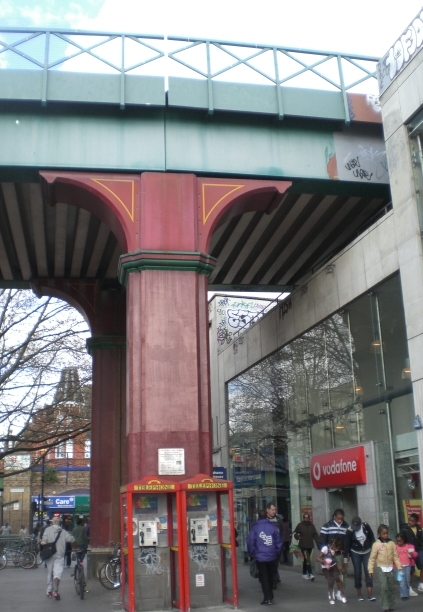
One of the high rail bridges above Brixton

The London Overground network passes above the station without stopping. This segment of the South London Line became part of the network as the second phase of the East London line extension project. Completed in December 2012, the extension connected the South London Line to the East and West London Lines, from Surrey Quays to Clapham Junction.

The line also passes through Loughborough Junction. Adding both stations to the route was excluded from the plan due to the prohibitive cost of building on the high viaducts at each location. The proposals drew criticism for not including new interchange stations at these locations. Until 1976 trains stopped at nearby East Brixton. It has been proposed that this disused station could be reopened instead as the site is close to both Brixton and Loughborough Junction.

== Artworks ==
A number of colourful murals have been painted on the outside of the station. Inside the station, three bronze sculptures stand on the platforms. This work, Platforms Piece by Kevin Atherton, was erected in 1986 and the statues are life casts of three people - two black, one white - who regularly travelled from Brixton. The statues, believed to be the first sculptures of black British people in a public place in the UK, were given Grade II listed status in November 2016.

== Gallery ==
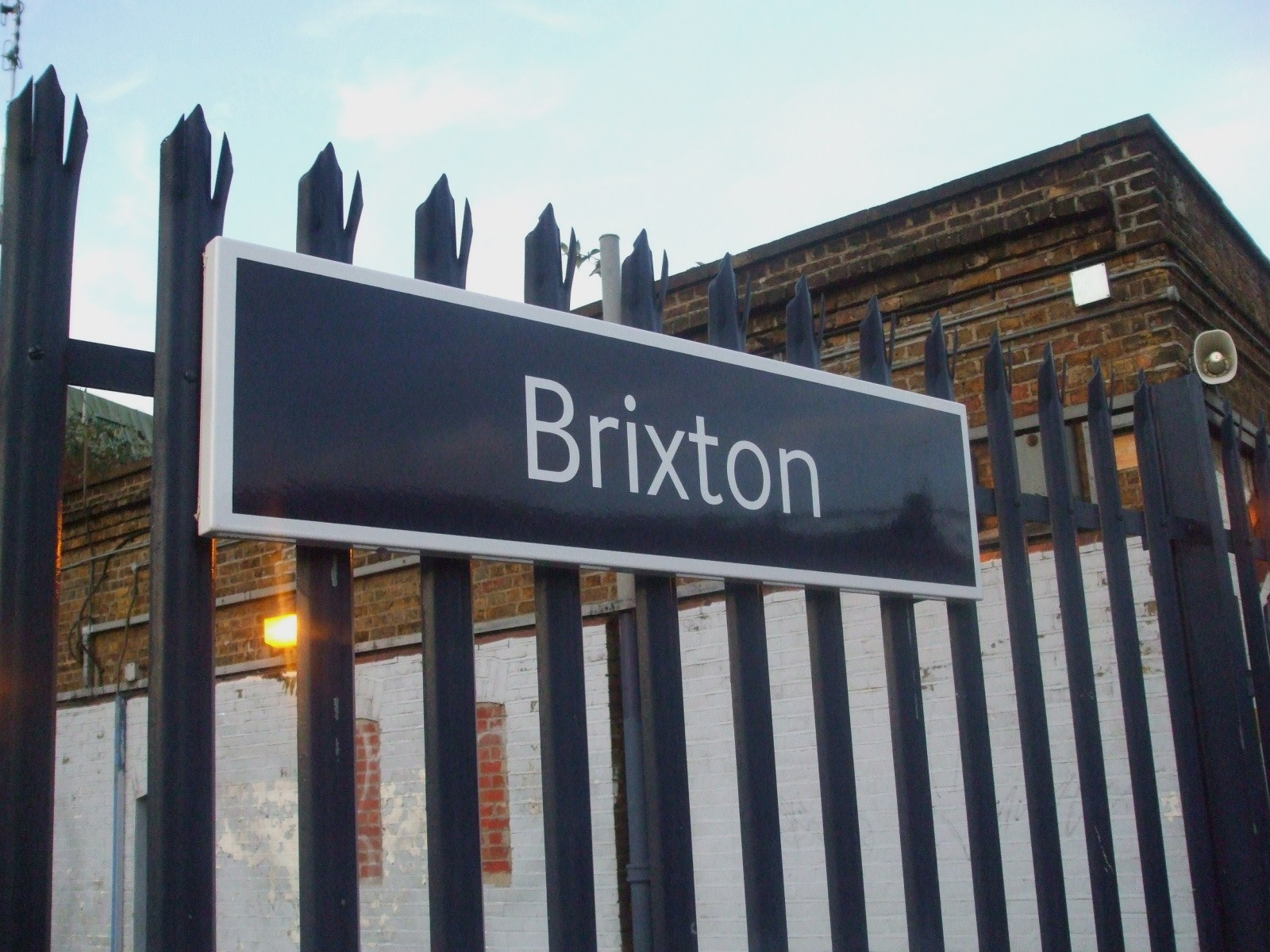
Southeastern branded signs

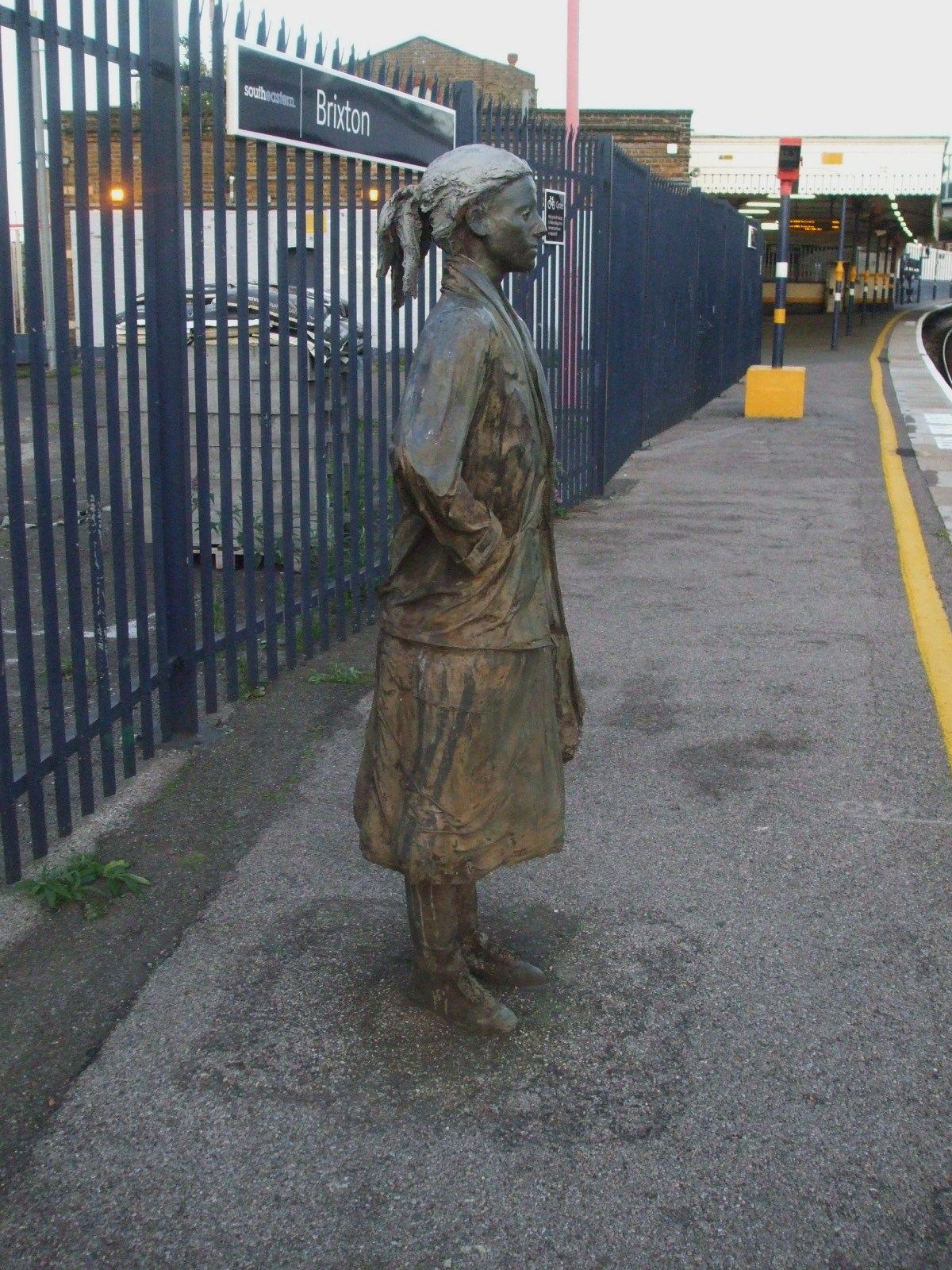
Woman waiting at Brixton

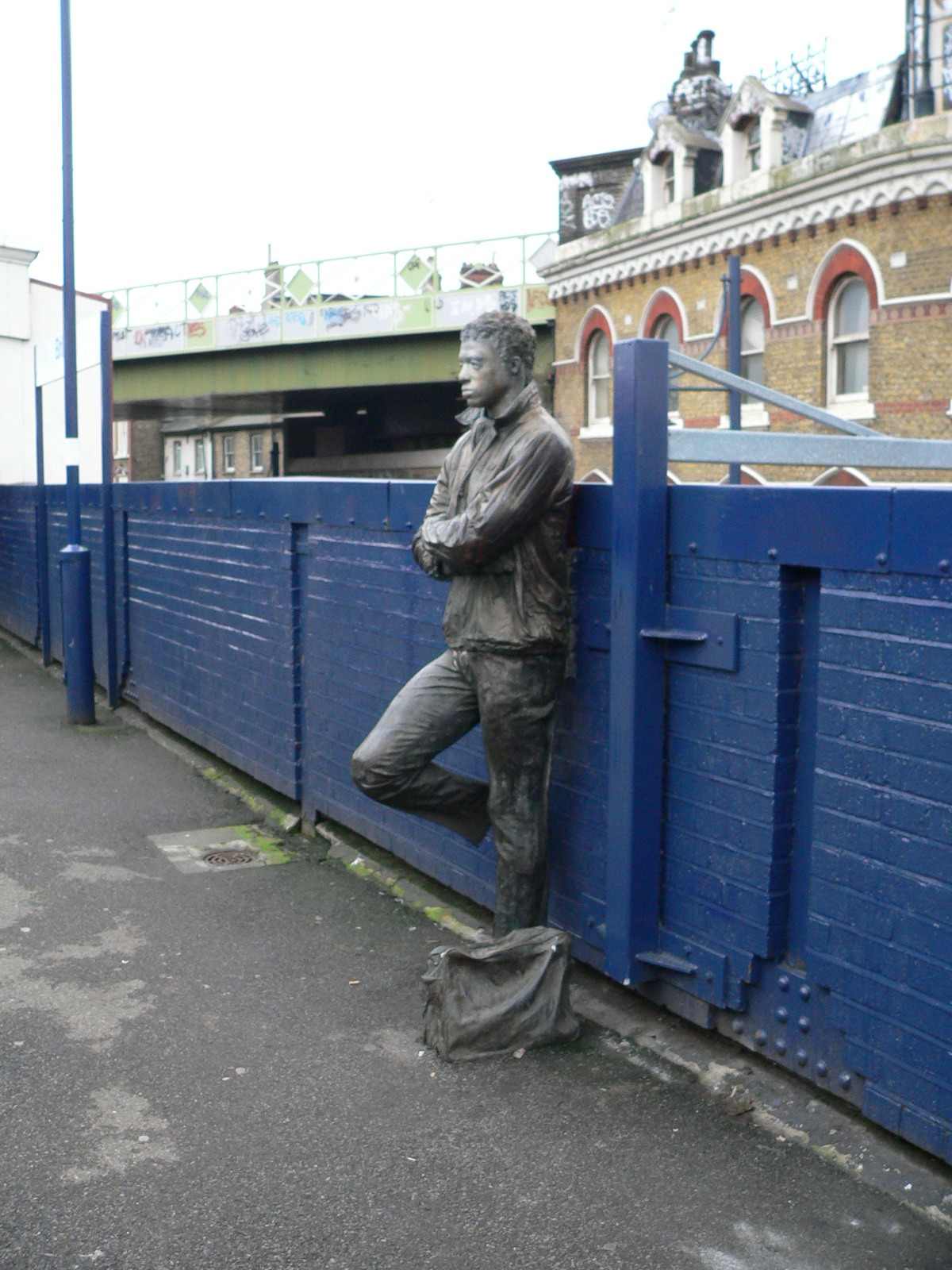
Her male counterpart

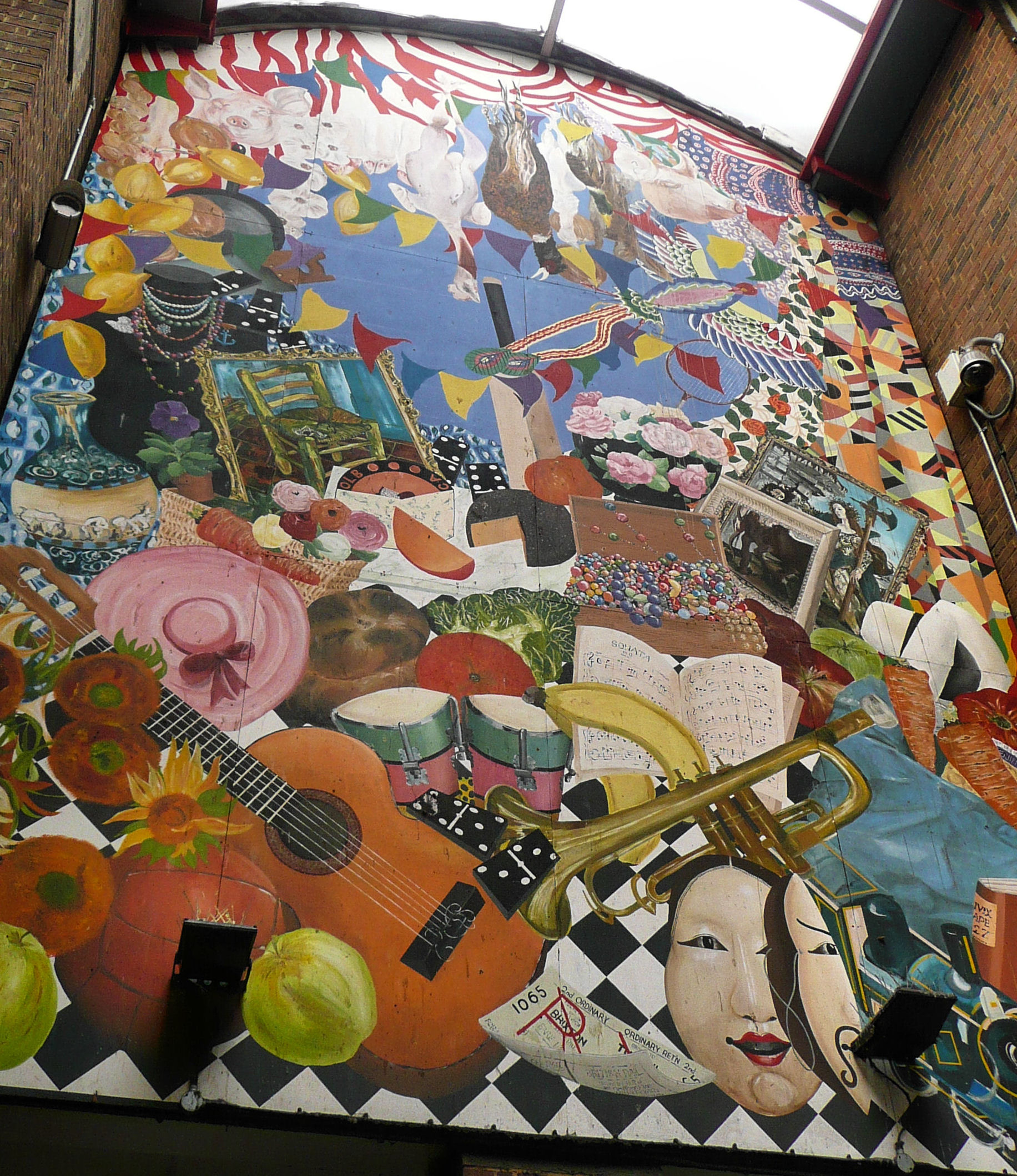
The Mural

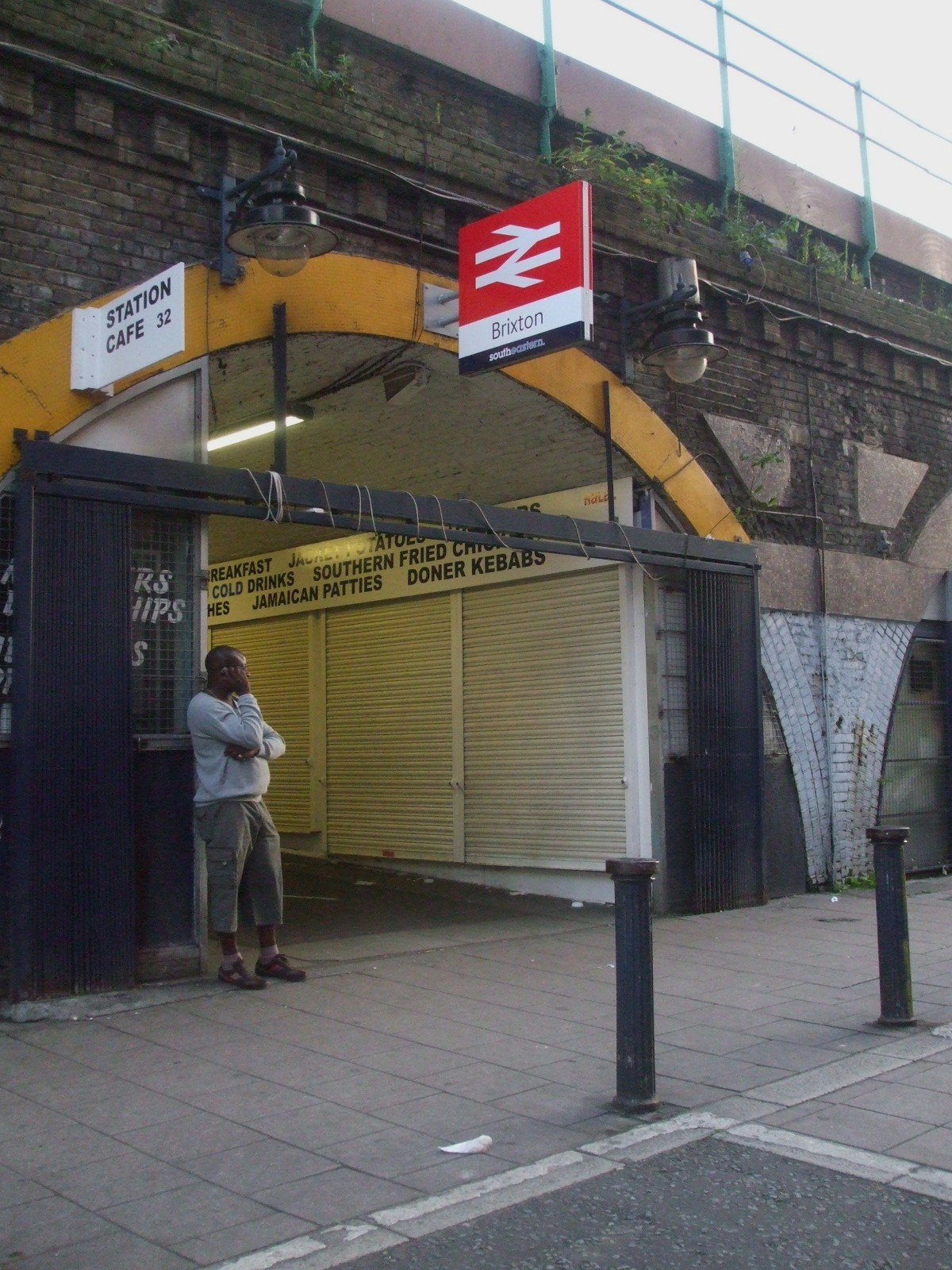
North entrance, cáfe closed

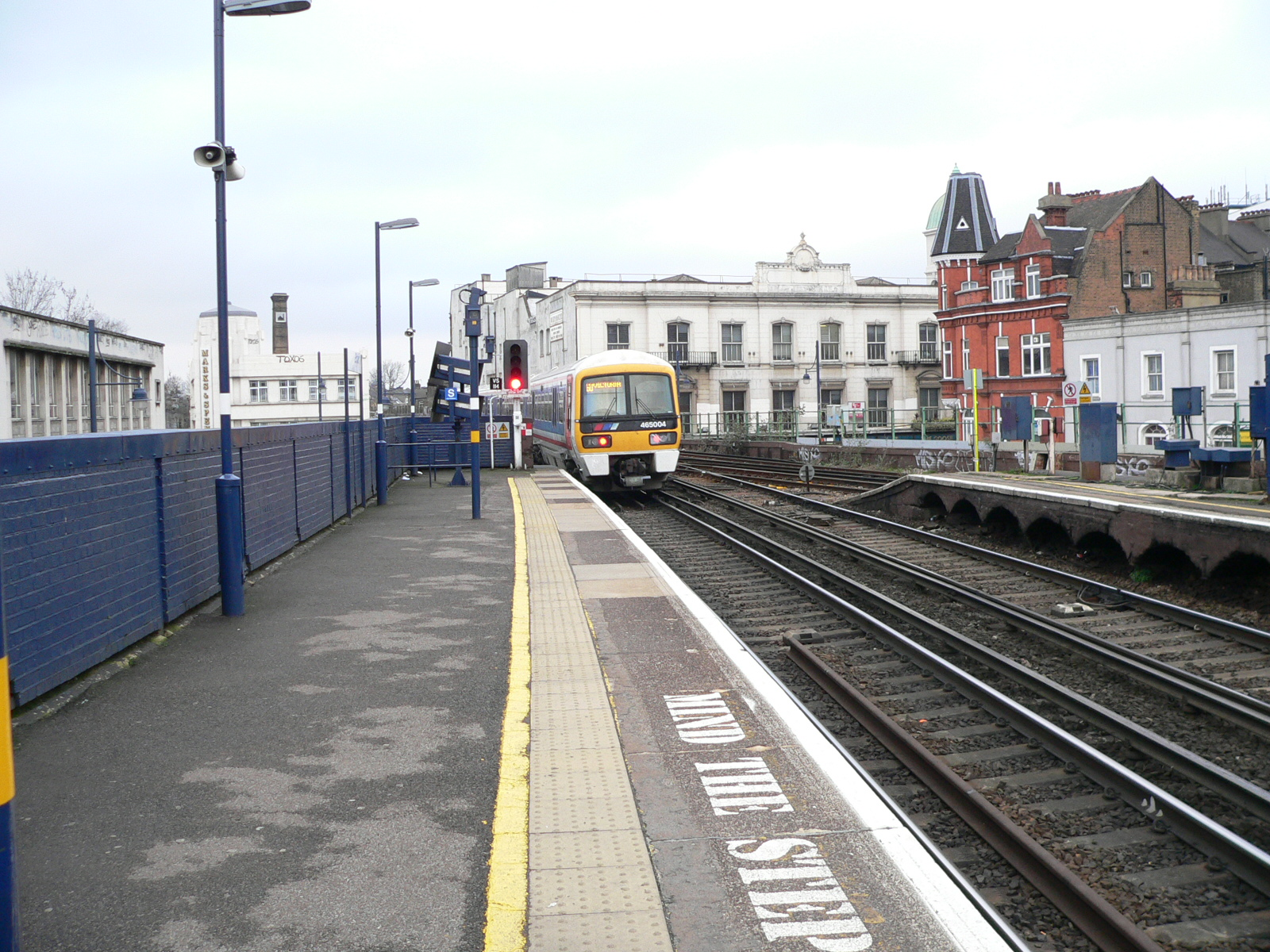
Networkers work the local trains.

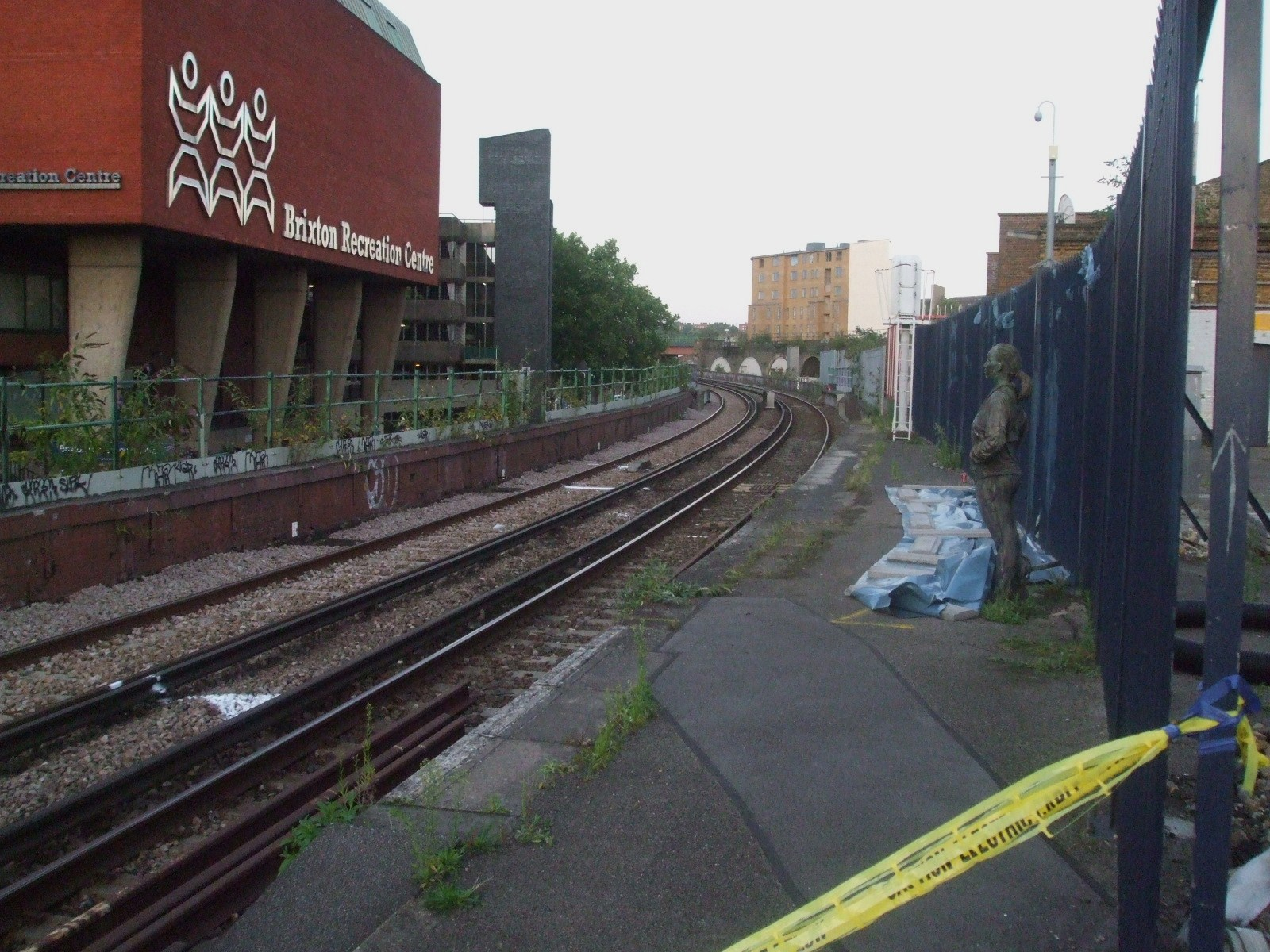
Disused platform linking to the Catford Loop Line, with third statue

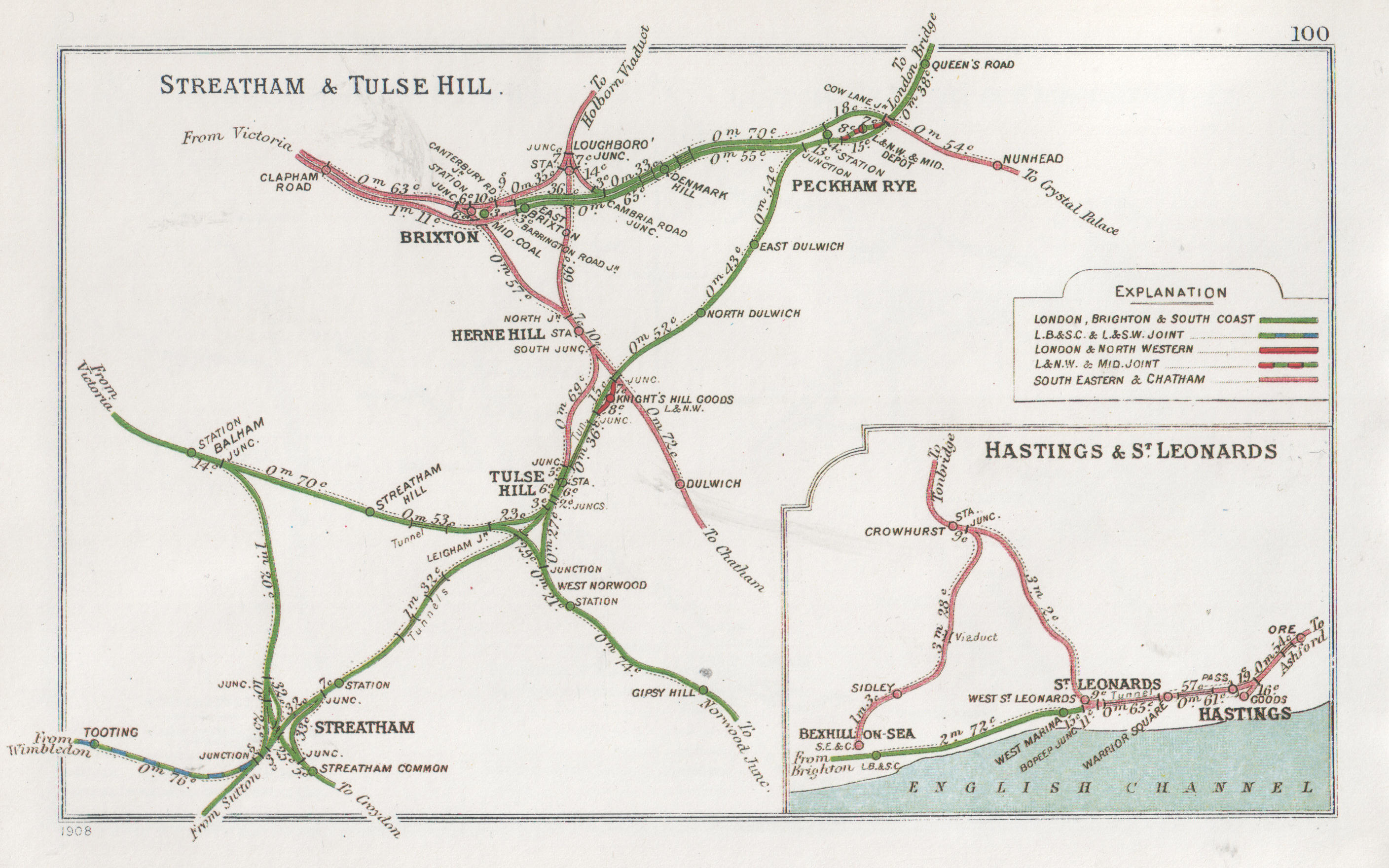
A 1908 Railway Clearing House map of lines through Brixton

== Connections ==
London Buses routes 2, 3, 35, 37 (at Lambeth Town Hall); 45, 59, 109, 133, 159, 196, 250, 322, 333, 345 (at Brixton Police Station), 355, 415, 432, 689, 690, P4, P5 and night routes N2, N3, N109 and N133 serve the station.

== See also ==
- Murder of Deborah Linsley – unsolved 1988 murder of a woman that occurred on a train travelling between Brixton and London Victoria
