= Joy Labinjo =

British–Nigerian artist (born 1994)

- Born: 1994 (age 31–32); Dagenham, England
- Education: Newcastle University BFA Fine Arts (2017); University of Oxford MFA (2020–present)
- Notable work: 5 More Minutes
- Awards: Woon Art Prize

Joy Labinjo is a British–Nigerian artist based in London, England. Born in 1994, she is known for her large colorful figure paintings with flattened perspective that take inspiration from her collection of old family photos, found photos and historical archives. Her paintings usually explore themes of culture, identity, race and belonging through her depictions of Black individuals and families in everyday situations while also drawing from her experiences growing up as a British-Nigerian woman in the U.K.

Labinjo received her BFA degree at Newcastle University in 2017 and received the Woon Art Prize (Note: Woon Art Prize website.) in the same year, which led to her being represented by Tiwani Contemporary. (Note: Tiwani Contemporary website.) In 2020, she started her MFA at the University of Oxford and a residency at the Breeder Gallery in Athens, Greece.

In 2021, Labinjo was commissioned to create a piece for Art on the Underground. From November of the same year, Brixton Underground station displayed her piece 5 More Minutes.

== Early life and education ==
Joy Labinjo was born in 1994, in Dagenham, England, to Nigerian parents; her father, a biochemist, and her mother, a teacher. She spent the earlier part of her childhood in her hometown and she and her family later moved to Stevenage; both towns had ethnically diverse communities. In secondary school, she found her passion for art by learning different media and about artists of the past. She decided to pursue this passion as a career.

Labinjo moved to Newcastle upon Tyne to continue her education at Newcastle University as one of the few students of color then studying within the fine arts program. In her third year of university, she studied in Vienna as she prepared to write her dissertation on young British artists. After undergoing some racist experiences and questioning the Eurocentric art history education she received during her studies, Labinjo became interested in, and later changed her dissertation to focus on, artists of the British Black art movement of the 1980s. She researched artists such as Sonia Boyce, Claudette Johnson, Lubaina Himid, Keith Piper and Donald Rodney who inspired her to create art that dealt with her identity. Expanding on her thesis and motivated to create art centered around Black individuals, Labinjo took inspiration from old family photo albums she found at her home during her Christmas break. Through collages of these photographs, she created the compositions for her paintings that made up the collection she submitted to her degree show in 2017 and that led to her being awarded the Woon Art Prize in the same year. In 2017, she graduated with a BFA in Fine Arts.

Even though she became known for the work she created toward the end of her BFA and after it, Labinjo still planned on continuing her education. In October 2020, she started as a part time MFA student at the Ruskin School of Art within the University of Oxford.

== Career ==
=== Early career ===
Labinjo won the Woon art prize, which awarded her a 12-month residency at Baltic29 and £20,000, At the end of her BFA at Newcastle University in 2017, she was offered representation by Tiwani Contemporary in London, which now (2022) continues to represent her.

Labinjo gained attention for her paintings depicting Black figures in day-to-day situations, inspired by old family photos. Her initial process of collage uses everything from old family photos to Instagram posts in order to create compositions and new environments for her paintings, known for their vivid colors, interesting patterns, flattened perspective, and bold brushstrokes.

In 2018, Labinjo presented her first solo exhibition, Recollections, at the Tiwani Contemporary gallery, of works inspired by family photos. Pieces such as The Elders, Visiting Great Grandma and Untitled (a portrait of a younger version of Labinjo and her aunt) were exhibited. Untitled sold for £69,300. In the same year, Labinjo started working in a studio in Brixton.

In October 2019, Tiwani Contemporary dedicated their booth at the Frieze Art Fair in London to Labinjo and her work. Labinjo received much attention at the fair due to three of her pieces being sold within the first couple of hours. In the same month, Joy Labinjo: Our histories cling to us, her first major solo institutional show, opened at the Baltic Centre for Contemporary Art. With a title from the Nigerian author Chimamanda Ngozi Adichie, this included works with similar themes and subject matter to those of her previous works. The exhibition closed in February 2020. In November 2019, Labinjo presented her work for the first time in Nigeria at the international art fair ART X Lagos.

=== Work after 2020 ===
Labinjo used her old family photos as the sole inspiration and subject for her work for almost three years. After her exhibition at the Baltic Centre for Contemporary Art in 2019, she decided to step away from those photos to create more variety in her work and paint people of different races. In this period she created works such Breakfast with Violet and Adam and Jenny and Louis, both depictions of white figures in everyday situations, similar to her work in the past. However, with the murder of George Floyd and the Black Lives Matter protests happening at the height of the 2020 COVID-19 pandemic, she continued creating work that highlighted and discussed the black experience but now had themes dealing with racism and political commentary. Pieces such as Enough is Enough, The real thugs of Britain, Africa, and We Don't See Colour, We Don't See You, show her response to the Black Lives Matter protests, hoping that these paintings would spark conversations of race and the origins of the United Kingdom within the country. In September 2020, she started a residency at the Breeder Gallery in Athens, Greece, where her solo exhibition The Elephant in the Room opened, containing her works, such as the previously mentioned, which dealt with more political and social commentary.

In October 2020 Labinjo started her MFA at the University of Oxford, and in December of that year Tiwani Contemporary presented another exhibition of her work for Art Basel Miami Beach OVR, the first time Labinjo presented work in the United States. The work focused on Black British historical figures, most notably a portrait of Sarah Forbes Bonetta, the Egbado princess sold into slavery who later became Queen Victoria's goddaughter.

=== 5 More Minutes- Art on the Underground ===
In 2021 Labinjo received a commission for her first public work from Art on the Underground. She created the piece 5 More Minutes for the underground station in Brixton, where her studio is located. Her largest painting to date depicts a scene of a Black hair salon and is reflects the community in the area as well as being an homage to these spaces. It gets its title from a phrase commonly heard in hair salons which Labinjo thought also worked perfectly for the underground station, which displayed the piece from November 2021 to November 2022.

=== Subsequent work ===
Throughout 2021 and 2022 Labinjo continued creating work inspired by politics and history, and even deeply personal pieces. In February 2022 her exhibition Full Ground was the debut show of a branch of Tiwani Contemporary in Lagos. It included a number of nude self-portraits as a response to how policed she felt over her body when visiting Nigeria. In March 2022, she opened another exhibition in Wales. Ode to Olaudah Equiano, opened at the Chapter Gallery and contained works that expanded upon her paintings of Black British historical figures done in 2020, this time primarily the abolitionists of the 18th century such as Olaudah Equiano. The exhibition included works such as An 18th-Century Family (now Fitzwilliam Museum, Cambridge),Ode to Olaudah Equiano, Olaudah Equiano and Ignatius Sancho.

== Awards ==
- Woon Art Prize – 2017

== Exhibitions ==
- Recollections – November–December 2018, Tiwani Contemporary Gallery
- Joy Labinjo: Our histories cling to us – October 2019 – February 2020, Baltic Centre for Contemporary Art
- The Elephant in the Room – September–October 2020, The Breeder art gallery, Athens, Greece.
- Art Basel Miami Beach OVR – December 2020
- Art on the Underground – November 2021 – November 2022, 5 More Minutes was displayed in Brixton Underground station.
- Full Ground – February–May 2022, Tiwani Contemporary, Lagos.
- Ode to Olaudah Equiano – March–July 2022, Chapter Gallery, Wales.
