= Memorials for the COVID-19 pandemic =

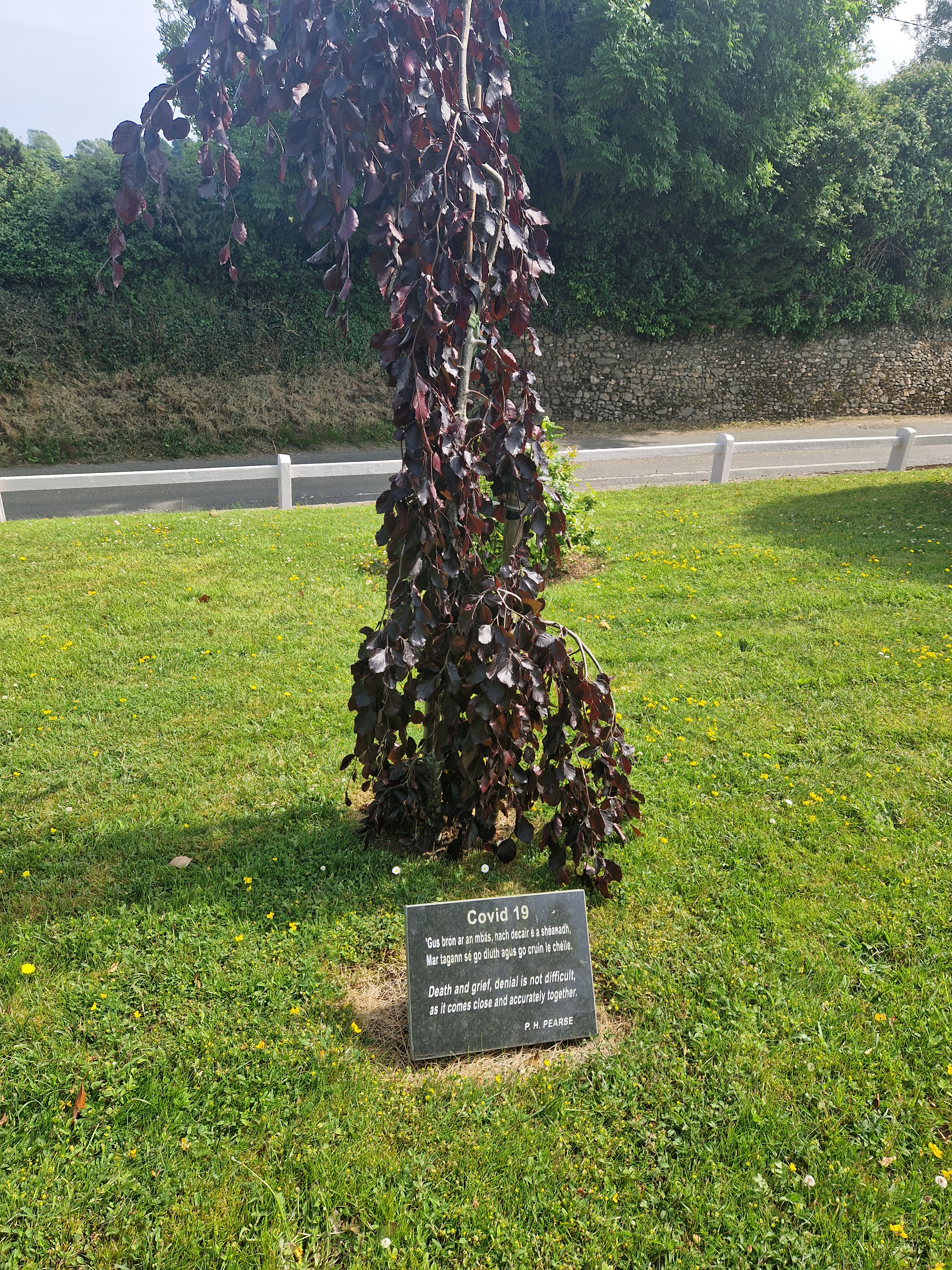
Memorial tree in Curracloe, Ireland, with quote by Pádraig Pearse.

Several permanent and temporary memorials for the global COVID-19 pandemic have been built. The pandemic started in 2020, and has caused the deaths of several million people worldwide.

== Permanent ==
=== London ===
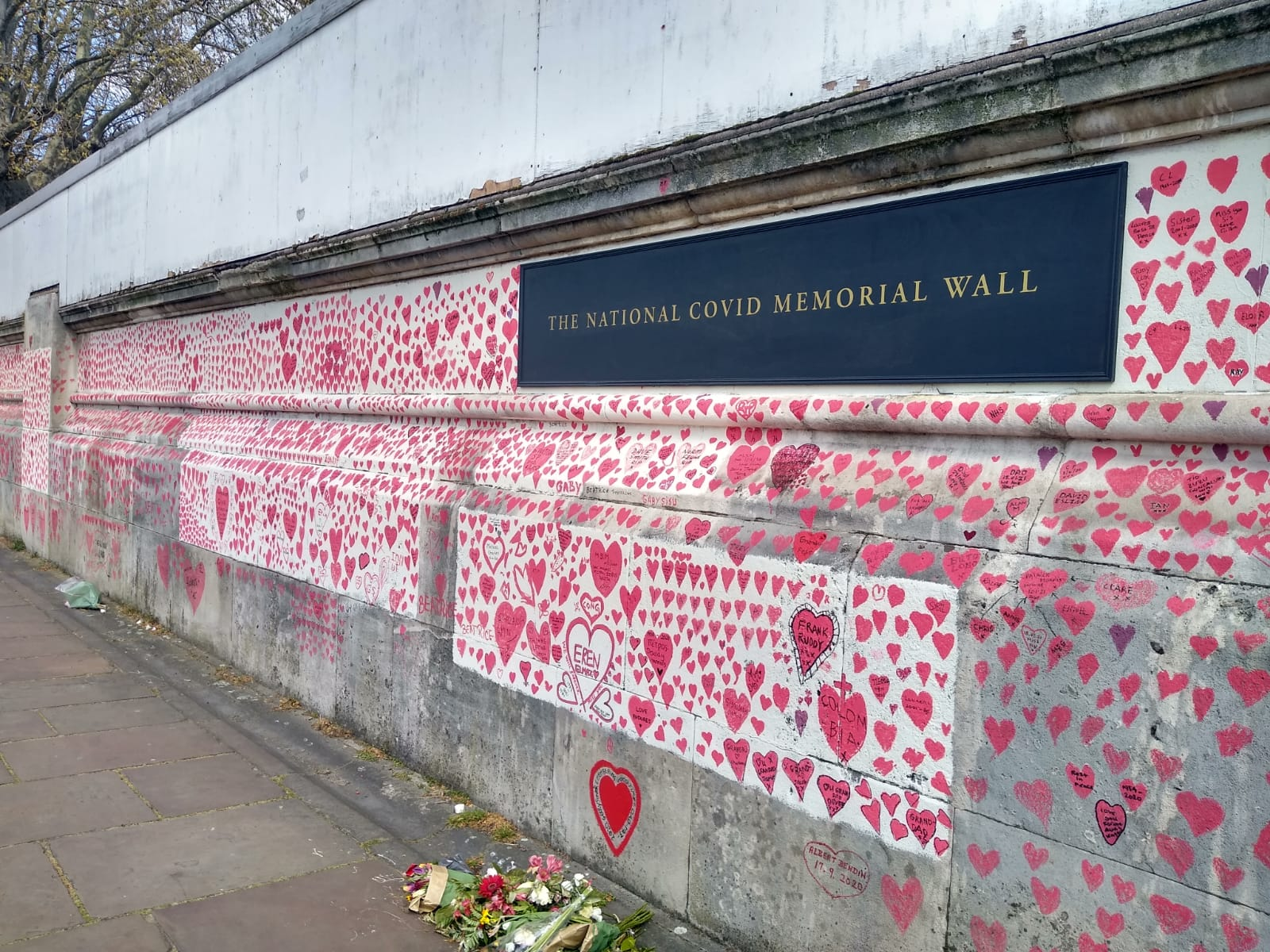
The National Covid Memorial Wall in 2021

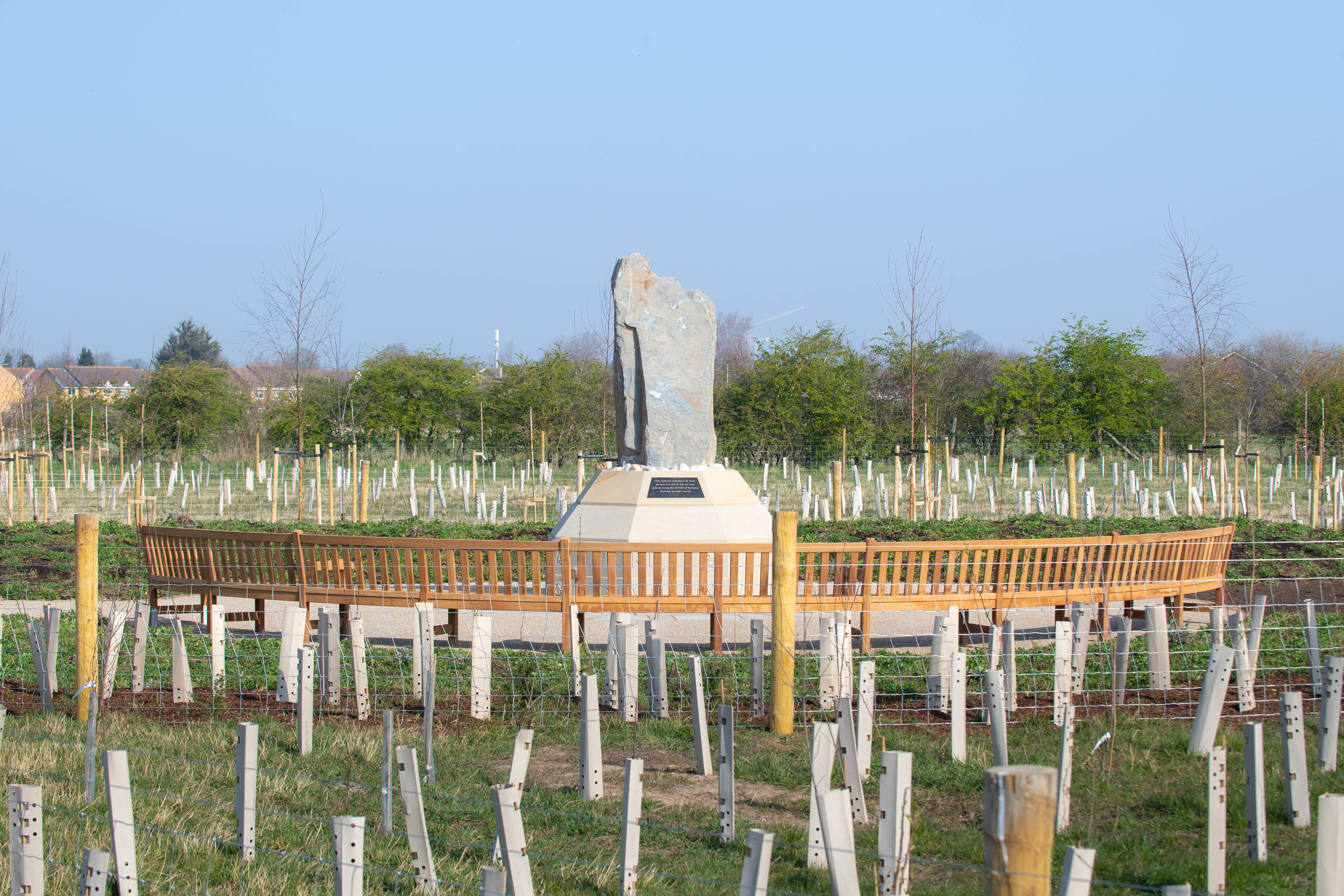
The COVID-19 Memorial Woodland

The National Covid Memorial Wall is a wall in London, along the South Bank of the River Thames. Started in March 2021, it stretches for over 500 metres and is filled with over 250,000 red hearts hand-painted by volunteers. Each heart represents a person who died in the United Kingdom with COVID-19 on their death certificate. In June of 2025, The National Covid Memorial Wall became a registered charity, and in November of 2025 it was announced in Parliament that the wall would be made permanent.

St Paul's Cathedral opened "Remember Me", both an online remembrance book and a memorial space within the Cathedral.

The COVID-19 Memorial Woodland is a part of Hornchurch Country Park in the London Borough of Havering, England. It has over 4,000 trees, and opened on the country's National Day of Reflection, marking two years since the first UK lockdown. Also in London, is the London Blossom Garden in the London Borough of Newham, near London Stadium. It has 33 blossom trees arranged in three circles to represent the 33 boroughs of London. This type of tree was decided upon because they blossom in March—the month that the first lockdowns began.

=== United Kingdom outside of London ===
In 2022, in Watford 18 cherry trees in a Ring of Reflection were unveiled as a memorial.

Ring of Reflection in Cassiobury Park, Watford

=== Spain ===
In May 2020, the Monument in Memory of the Victims of the COVID-19 Pandemic was unveiled in Madrid while many other memorials are spread across the country.

Memorial to the Victims of Covid-19 in Ávila, Spain

=== Belgium ===
Onuments are circular memorial sites in Belgium, created by psychiatrist Uus Knops and landscape architect Bas Smets. Designed for reflection, mourning, and solace, they consist of 13 concrete seating elements in a broken circle, symbolizing the disruption of the COVID-19 lockdown in March 2020. Each site is uniquely integrated into its natural surroundings, inviting both personal and communal use.

The first Onument was inaugurated on June 20, 2021, in Kortrijk's Begraafpark Hoog Kortrijk, followed by a second on March 13, 2022, at Campo Santo in Ghent. Subsequent Onuments opened on December 4, 2022, in the Lommel German war cemetery, and on December 3, 2022, on a hill in Aarschot. On March 13, 2024, new sites were unveiled in Leuven's Egenhoven and Brussels' Osseghem Park.

=== Maryland, United States ===
As far as yet established, the world’s first Covid-19 memorial was created in Germantown, Maryland, in the spring of 2020 by artist A. Chris Wikman. As a sculpture, The Covid Memorial Pyramid was created using naturally found materials around the site, including quartz for the face stones and a mix of dirt, clay, shredded pine needles and water for the mortar, with minimal disturbance to the local ecology. The geometry of the pyramid follows closely that of the Great Pyramid of Giza (Egypt), and the faces are closely aligned to the four compass directions. An engraved wooden memorial plaque stands near the memorial.

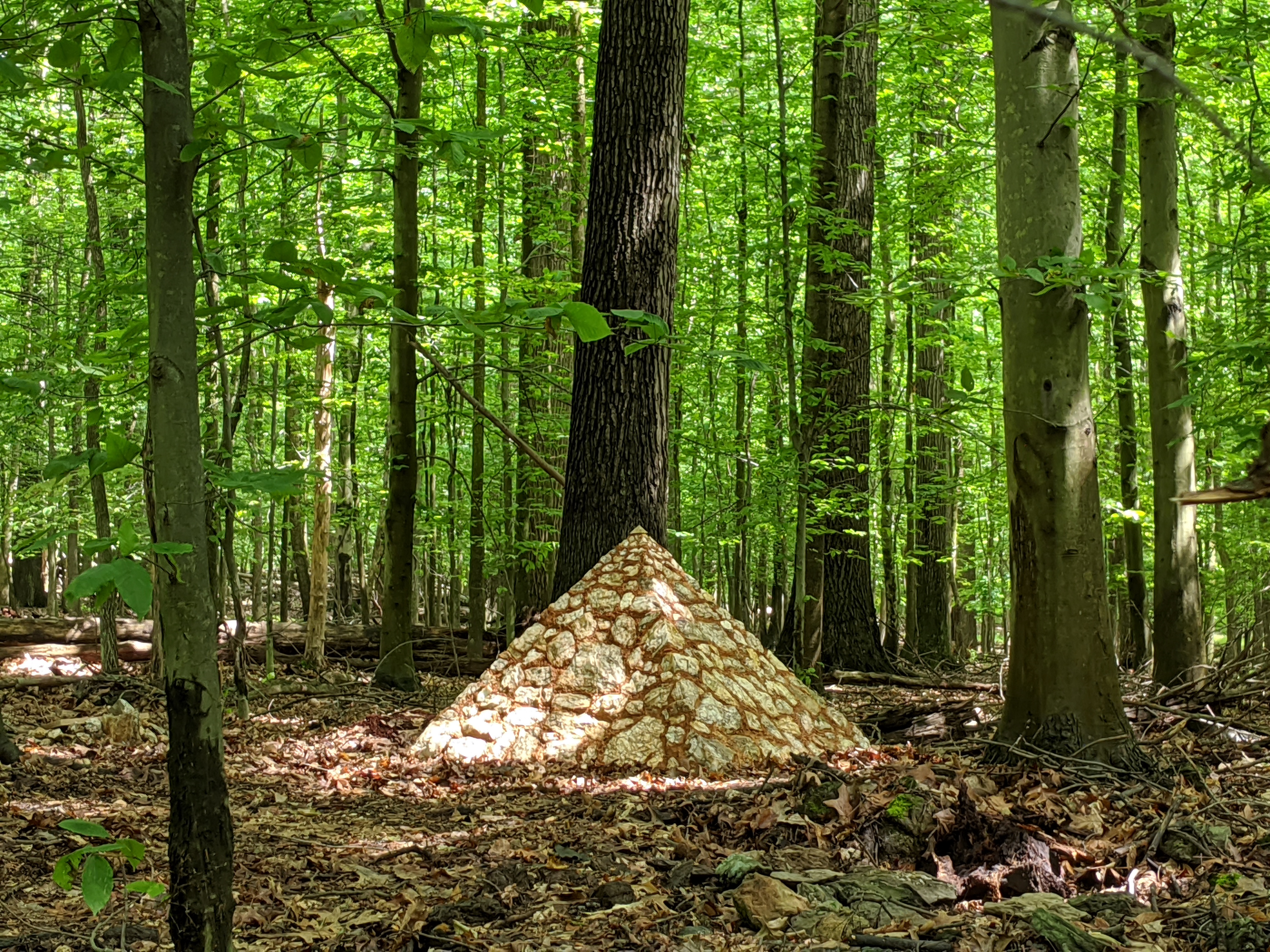
The Covid Memorial Pyramid in Maryland, USA in 2020

== Temporary ==
In America: Remember was a temporary art installation in the National Mall in Washington, D.C. from 17 September to 3 October 2021. It had one small white flag placed in the mall for every American who died as a result of COVID-19. At the start of the display, it had 600,000 flags, and by the end of it, 701,133.

== Planned and proposed ==
The Essential Workers Monument is a proposed monument in New York City to commemorate key workers during the pandemic. Skyway Park, a park currently being developed (as of 2020) in Jersey City, New Jersey, will have a COVID-19 memorial.

The COVID-19 Memorial Monument of Honor, Remembrance and Resilience is a public memorial under construction in Chicago's Illinois Medical District, scheduled for completion in late 2025.
