= COVID-19 lockdown in the United Kingdom =

Stay-at-home order strategy during the pandemic

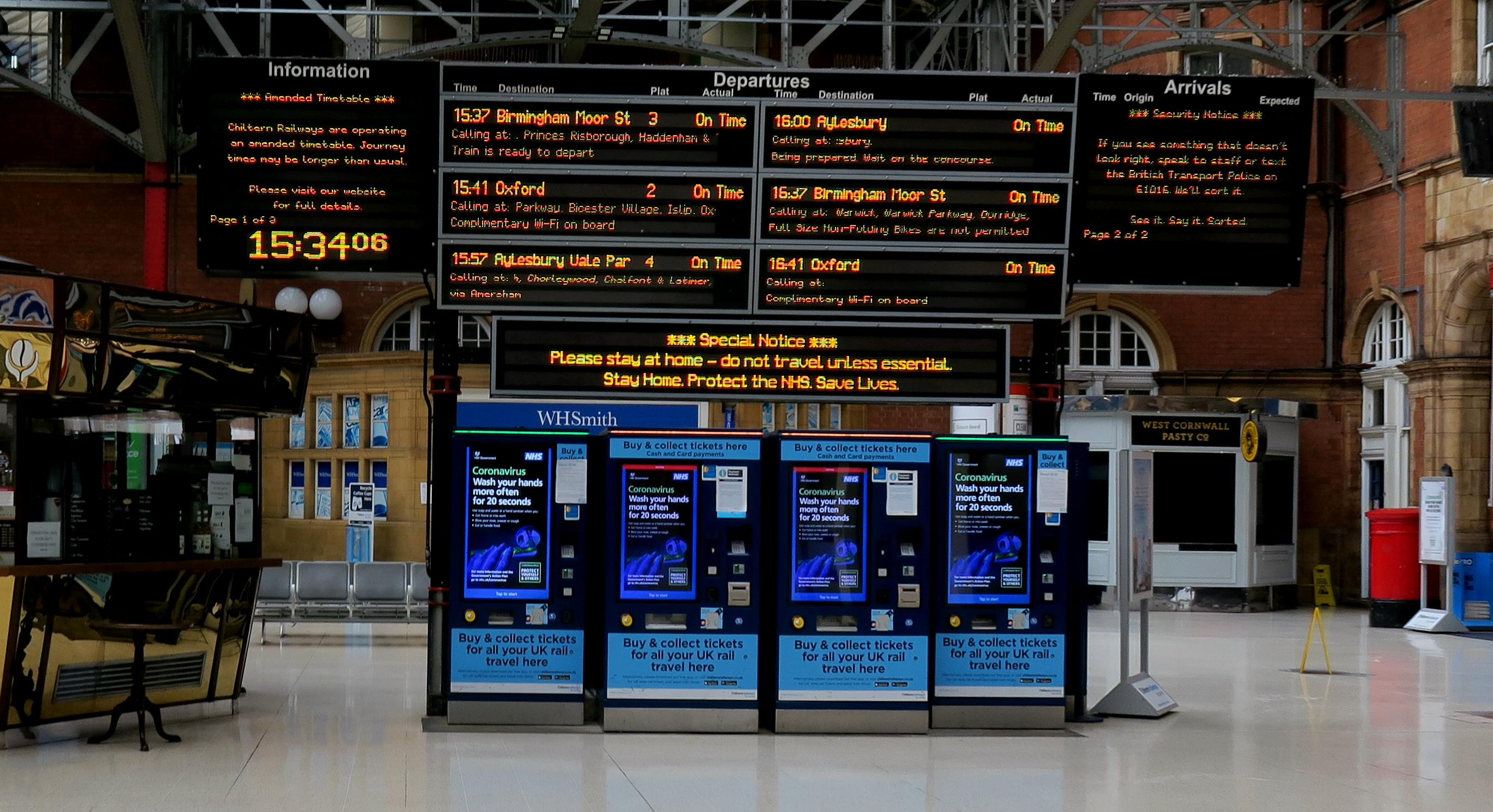
Marylebone station in London during the first nationwide lockdown in April 2020

A series of stay-at-home orders was introduced by the UK and devolved governments in response to the COVID-19 pandemic. On 23 March 2020, Prime Minister Boris Johnson announced a nationwide lockdown to curb the widening outbreak of COVID-19. This involved closing many sectors and ordering the public to stay at home. It was an extension of the previous advice to avoid all non-essential contact, which was issued on 16 March 2020. This was incrementally lifted, starting from several weeks later. Similar restrictions were introduced in late 2020 and early 2021 as infections rose. Restrictions applied to certain areas, and then on a larger scale, differing between the four countries of the United Kingdom to which Health is devolved, with the central government being responsible for England.

== First nationwide lockdown ==
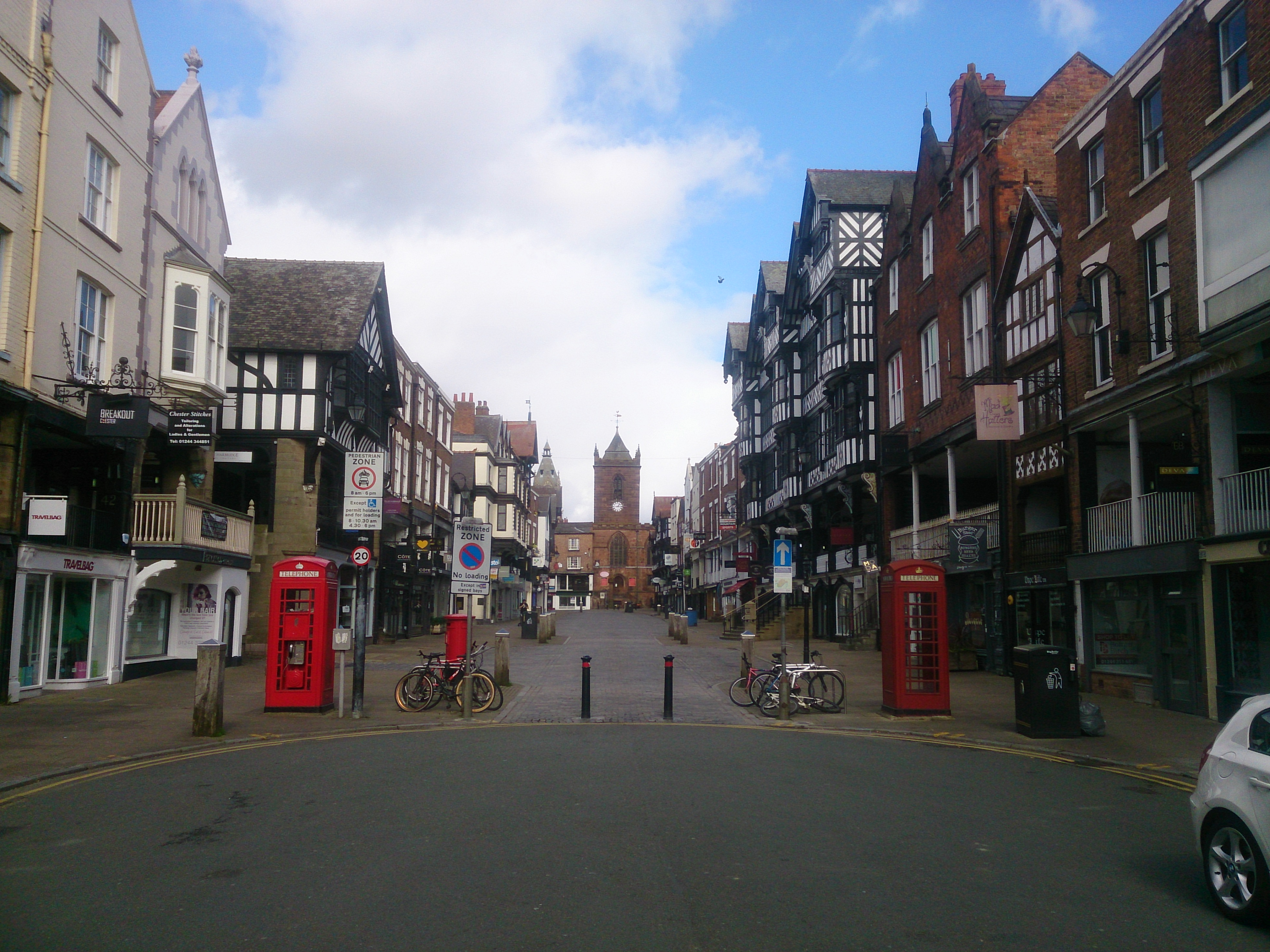
Chester city centre during the first lockdown in April 2020

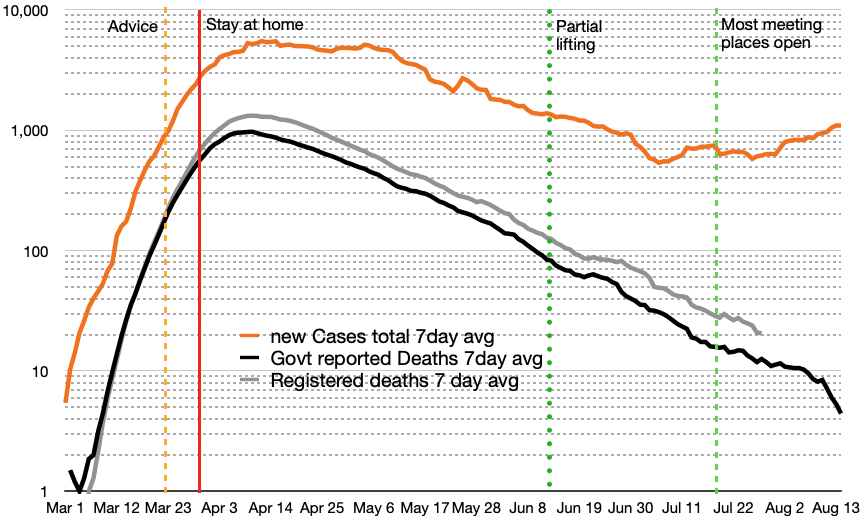
New COVID-19 cases and deaths in the UK, with the dates of lockdown and its partial lifting. This shows both the COVID-19 death figures confirmed by tests and the figures registered by three authorities.

The initial announcement was made by Boris Johnson, with agreement from the other three heads of government. At 8:30 p.m. on 23 March 2020, Boris Johnson announced a stay-at-home order effective immediately, though only legally effective from 1:00 p.m. on 26 March 2020, through The Health Protection (Coronavirus, Restrictions) (England) Regulations 2020.

The slogan "Stay Home, Protect the NHS, Save Lives" was used in England. All non-essential shops and services were ordered to close throughout the UK and police were granted powers to issue fines, send people home, especially persons suspected of being infected, and to break up gatherings of more than two people. The British population was instructed to stay home, except for exercise once a day (such as running, walking or cycling), shopping for essential items, any medical need, providing care to a vulnerable person, or travelling to work where the work in question was vital and could not be done from home. Johnson stated that the stay-at-home order would be reviewed every three weeks. Working with general practitioners, the four NHS bodies strongly advised (though did not mandate) that those at the highest risk of severe complications from COVID-19 follow special shielding measures. These included not leaving their home at all, even for essential reasons, and keeping two metres apart from other household members.

On 11 May, following the initial lockdown announcement, the UK-wide rules fractured and separate rules were announced at various times by the four governments of the United Kingdom.

== Wales ==
On 26 March the Health Protection (Coronavirus, Restrictions) (Wales) Regulations 2020 were approved by the Senedd, giving the Welsh Government emergency powers to deal with various aspects of managing the pandemic. These new powers include the authority to:

- Take people into or keep them in quarantine
- Restrict or prohibit mass gatherings
- Close premises

On 26 March, Snowdon and other Welsh mountains were closed to the public, after a larger number of tourists had gathered on the mountains in the preceding days, causing traffic mayhem. Natural Resources Wales later announced that all sites and paths liable to have large numbers of people visiting, or pose a high risk, would be closed.

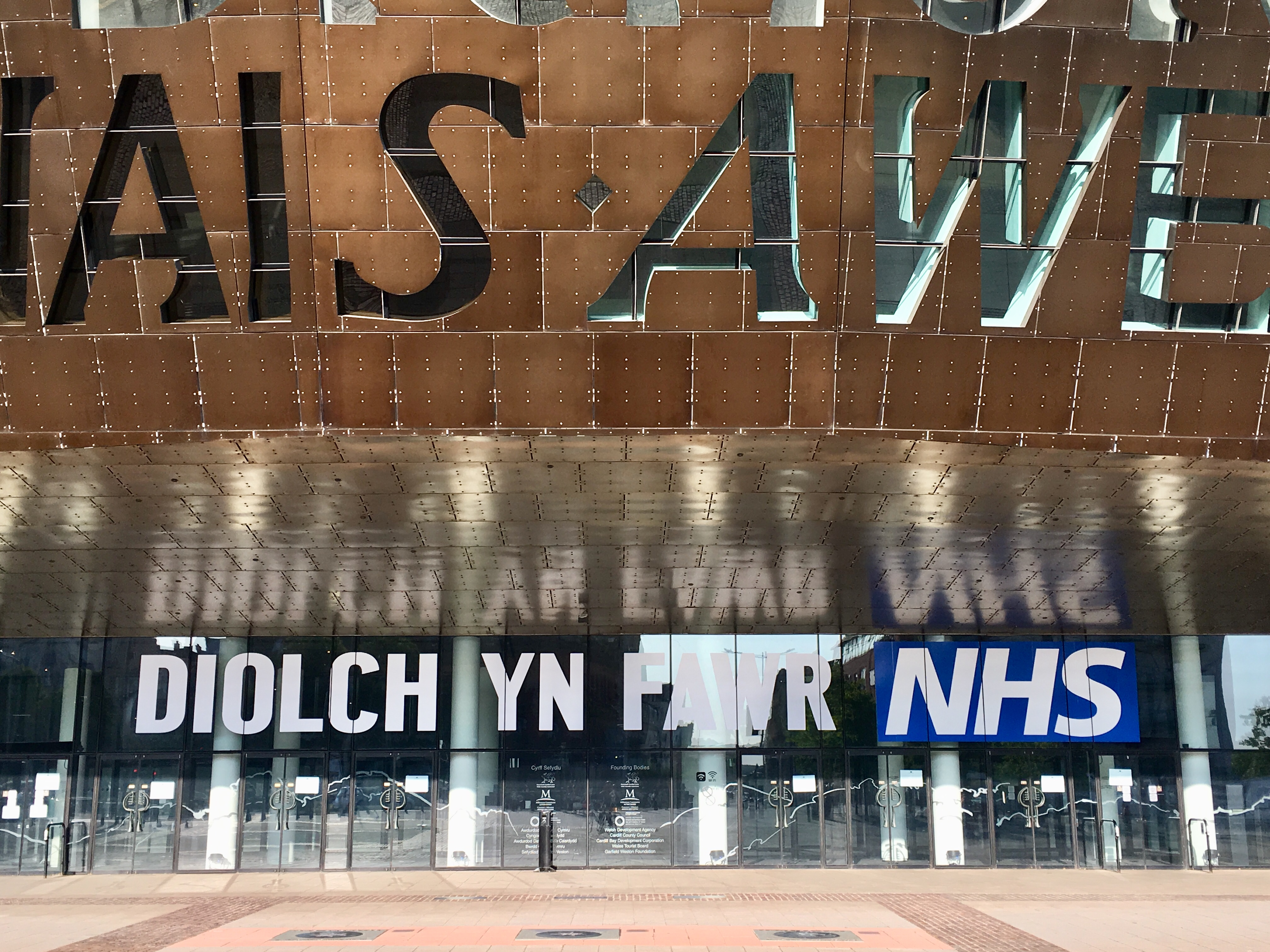
Diolch Yn Fawr NHS, Wales Millennium Centre

By 27 March, North Wales Police were patrolling the border between Wales and England because visitors were ignoring the stay-at-home instructions and travelling into Wales. In many cases the police were stopping cars entering from England; such border control had not happened between Wales and England since the 16th century.

On 8 May, First Minister Mark Drakeford announced that the COVID-19 lockdown in Wales would be extended for a further three weeks. He also announced "modest" changes to the measures already in force: some garden centres would be allowed to re-open, and people could now exercise outdoors more than once per day provided that they "stay local".

On 3 June, Welsh Government briefings began (later referred to as 'press conferences') in a series that was set up by Welsh Government as a way of dispersing new information to the people of Wales regarding the COVID-19 pandemic in Wales. These were placed on a CC BY-SA open licence.

Restrictions were further eased by an announcement on 31 July, confirming that pubs and restaurants would be able to open indoor areas on 3 August. Up to thirty people would be able to meet outdoors and children under 11 would no longer have to keep a 2-metre (6.6 ft) distance from anyone. Indoor bowling alleys, auction houses and bingo halls were allowed to reopen, while swimming pools, gyms, leisure centres and indoor play areas would be allowed to reopen from 10 August, all with social distancing.

Towards the end of August, concerns grew about a potential second spike in infections, after passengers arriving at Cardiff Airport from overseas tested positive for the virus. The flight operator, TUI Group, was criticised for failing to enforce mask-wearing during the flight. Health Minister Vaughan Gething later revealed that 30 cases had been linked to four flights into the UK from the island of Zante, and the Welsh and Scottish governments lobbied the UK government to have the island included in the list of quarantine destinations for the UK as a whole.

=== Firebreak ===
On 19 October, the Welsh Government announced that a second national lockdown, described as a "fire-break", would be imposed from 23 October until 9 November, coinciding with school half-term holidays which would be extended by a week in colleges and for school students in year 9 (13 to 14 years old) and above, in the hope of bringing down the number of coronavirus cases. The First Minister announced that all pubs, restaurants, and non-essential shops would be closed during that period.

Welsh government press conference on 19 October 2020 announcing the firebreak lockdown

After the firebreak, rules were standardised across Wales with localised restrictions abolished. From 9 November, pubs, restaurants and cafes reopened with groups of up to four people (children under eleven not counting in the total) from different households allowed to meet up in them; the 10pm curfew for alcohol sales remained in place. Non essential shops also reopened. Two households could form a bubble (interact when they wished) whilst any number of children under eleven and up to 15 or 30 individuals over that age could take part in indoor and outdoor organised events respectively. Travel restrictions within Wales were lifted though non essential visits to other parts of the UK or abroad remained banned.

=== Third lockdown ===
Announced on 16 December, the Welsh Government planned to go into a full lockdown immediately after the 5-day Christmas period (23–27 December) on 28 December. However, on 19 December 2020, it was announced that Wales would go into a full lockdown (or "tier 4" restrictions) immediately at midnight on 20 December. The circumstance for the latest lockdown was reviewed every three weeks, but no end date was announced.

This followed the emergence of a novel variant of COVID-19 in the United Kingdom. Original joint plans of relaxed restrictions from 23 to 28 December were in place for the entire United Kingdom, but this was amended so that the sole relaxed period would consist of Christmas Day, in which only two households will be allowed to meet. Before and after Christmas Day, meeting with people from different households, was not allowed to take place indoors. Those that do meet with other households outdoors must stay at least 2 meters apart from each other and wear PPE.

== Northern Ireland ==
"Stay Alert, Control the Virus, Save Lives" slogan rejected and "Stay home, Protect the NHS, Save Lives" was used.

On 15 April, Arlene Foster, the First Minister of Northern Ireland, extended the period of lockdown in Northern Ireland to 9 May, as 121 new cases and 6 new deaths were confirmed.

On 7 May, the Northern Ireland Executive met to discuss a roadmap to ending lockdown restrictions, with an announcement due during the week beginning 11 May.

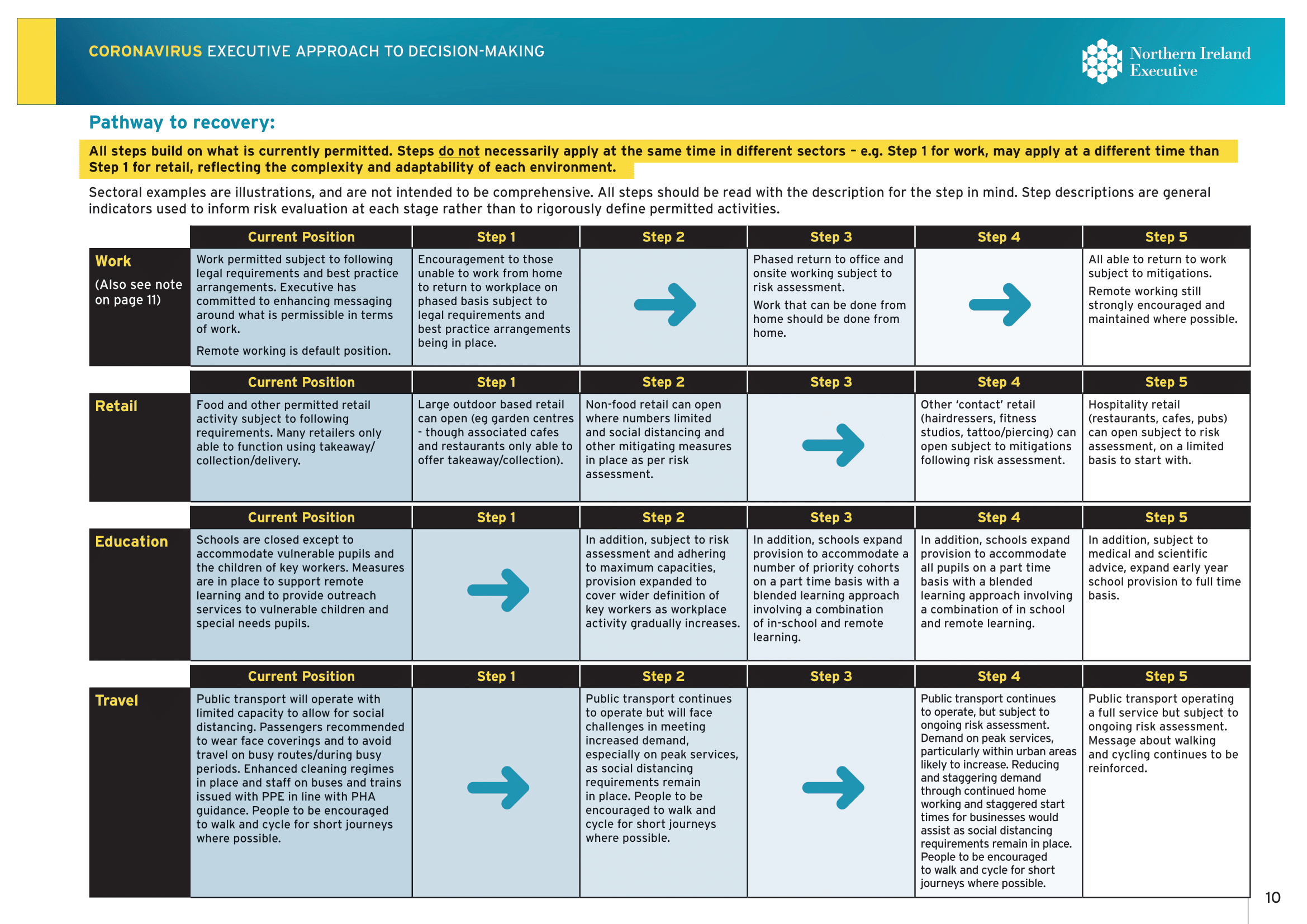
NI Executive roadmap to exiting lockdown

On 18 May, the Northern Ireland Executive activated some aspects of step one with garden and recycling centres allowed to open. However, on the same day, it was announced that further measures of step one would be activated on Tuesday 19 May such as groups of up to six people who do not share a household being able to meet outside and private church services being allowed.

On 15 June, the Executive announced more lockdown easing this time focusing on the hospitality industry with hotels, restaurants and bars that sell food or have a large beer garden being allowed to open from 3 July 2020.

On 25 June it was announced that Northern Ireland would be reducing its 2-metre social distancing rule to 1 metre. At the end of June, there were a total of 5,760 confirmed cases of COVID-19 in Northern Ireland, with 551 deaths.

July saw a further relaxation of COVID-19 rules with betting shops, private clubs, restaurants, museums, and tourist sites opening on 3 July with salon and close contact services on 6 July. 10 July saw indoor gyms, outdoor playgrounds, weddings and baptisms, bingo and cinemas and competitive sports behind closed doors allowed. Libraries and indoor leisure centres followed. On 10 July the wearing of face coverings became compulsory on public transport in Northern Ireland, exceptions will be for those with a medical condition, children under the age of 13, and on school transport.

On 5 August it was announced that all pupils will return to school five days a week as normal at the start of term time in September. Education Minister Peter Weir announced that years 1 to 10 will return to class in protected bubbles, with minimised movements between classes for years 11 to 14.

On 20 August the Executive announced that some restrictions were to be reintroduced following rising cases in recent days. Restrictions announced included reducing indoor gatherings from 10 to six people and outdoor meetings from 30 to 15.

On 10 September the Northern Ireland Executive imposed new restrictions on visiting homes for Ballymena, and parts of Glenavy, Lisburn and Crumlin, following a rise in COVID-19 cases in those areas. From the following week, people living in those areas are limited to social gatherings of six and are encouraged not to travel outside the areas. The Executive also announced further easing of restrictions nationally in Northern Ireland such as the reopening of wet bars on 21 September.

=== Circuit breaker measures ===
On 14 October the Northern Ireland Executive announced a new 'circuit breaker' lockdown effective from Friday 16 October for four weeks. On Friday 16 October, Northern Ireland commenced a partial lockdown.

On 3 December, the Executive agreed to ease restrictions on 11 December. Non-essential retail, close contract business, churches and gyms can reopen with social distancing and some limitations being observed. Parts of the hospitality industry can reopen such as cafes, restaurants and bars that serve food can open but must be closed by 23:00, wet pubs must remain shut.

=== Later lockdowns ===
On 17 December, the Northern Ireland executive announced Northern Ireland would go into a lockdown from 26 December. This involved the closure of all non-essential retail, hospitality. The Christmas bubble system remained in place. Due to the spread of a new variant of COVID-19 throughout Northern Ireland, the Executive hardened restrictions further on 5 January 2021. From Friday 8 January a stay-at-home order became law meaning people can only leave home for medical or food needs, exercise, and work that cannot be done from home. Further restrictions were also announced for schools with pupils from nursery, primary and post-primary schools carrying out remote learning until after the mid-term break in the middle of February 2021.

== Scotland ==
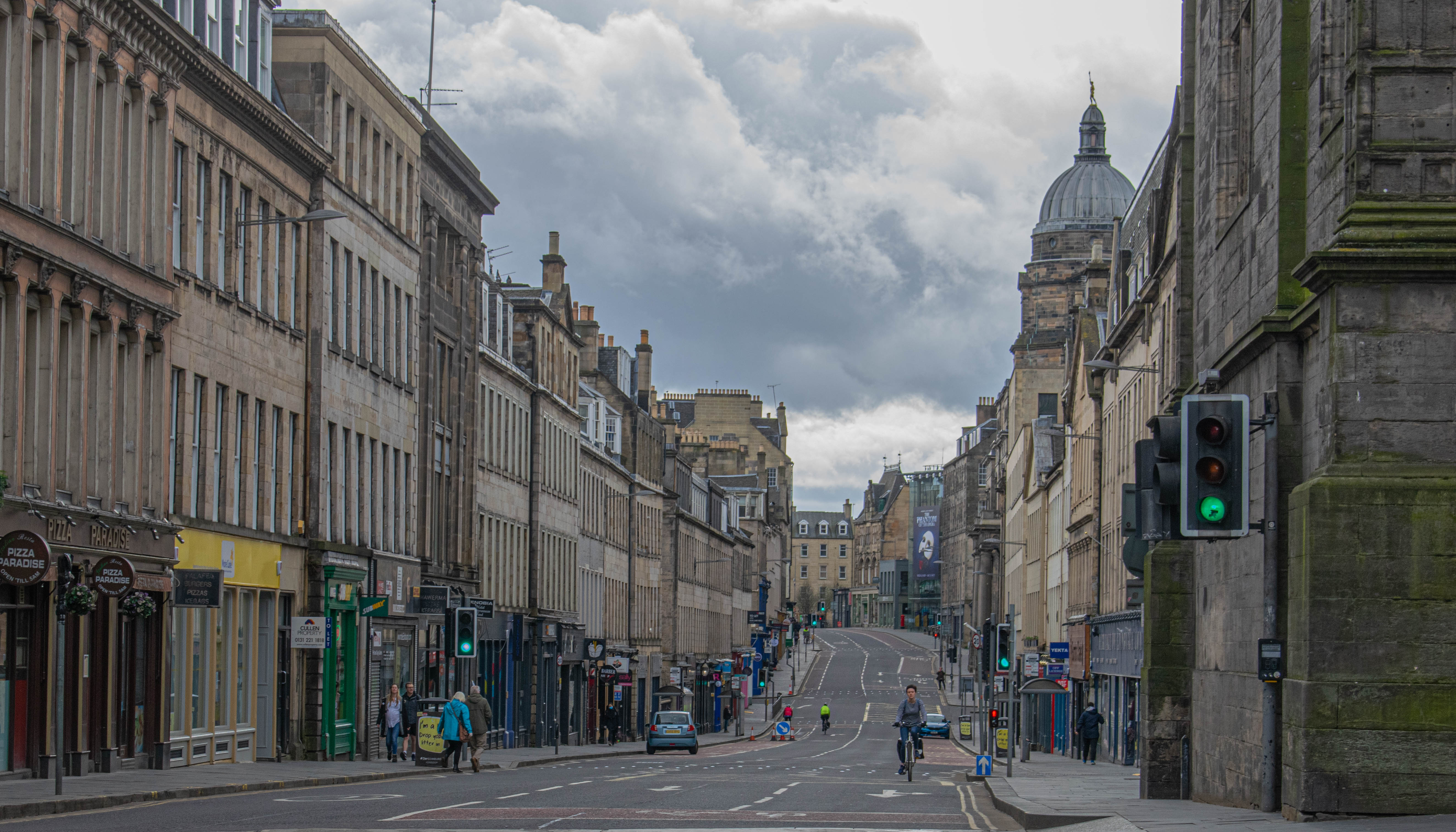
South Bridge, Edinburgh in April 2020

"Stay Alert, Control the Virus, Save Lives" slogan rejected and "Stay home, Protect the NHS, Save Lives" was used.

On 20 March the Scottish Government told cafes, pubs, and restaurants to close. (Note: Beyond these 3 types of establishments, also told to close were: Nightclubs and other drinking establishments; Cinemas, theatres and bingo halls and concert halls; Spas, wellness centres and massage parlours; Casinos and betting shops; Indoor leisure facilities such as gyms and swimming pools)

On 6 April the Coronavirus (Scotland) Act 2020, which was introduced as an Emergency Bill in the Scottish Parliament on 31 March 2020, gained Royal Assent, becoming law.

On 16 April, after reviewing the lockdown with all nations in the UK, the decision was made to extend it for another 3 weeks until 7 May. First Minister Nicola Sturgeon in her daily briefing said, "I want to stress that the news is positive [...] Early indications are that the lockdown restrictions have resulted in a slowing down in the rate of community transmission of the virus."

On 8 May First Minister Nicola Sturgeon reported that there was some recognition that each of the four nations of the UK might move at different speeds with regard to loosening the lockdown and that she would not be pressured into lifting restrictions prematurely.

On 11 May, in a national address to Scotland on the beginning of the seventh week of lockdown, Nicola Sturgeon asked the nation "to stick with lockdown for a bit longer – so that we can consolidate our progress, not jeopardise it [...] I won't risk unnecessary deaths by acting rashly or prematurely."

On 21 May First Minister Nicola Sturgeon outlined a four-phase "route map" for easing lockdown restrictions in Scotland. The route map allowed people to meet up outside with people from one other household in the first phase. The lockdown would be eased from 28 May subject to the number of new cases of COVID-19 continuing to fall. Schools in Scotland would reopen on 11 August, when students would receive a "blended model" of part-time study at school combined with some learning at home.

On 28 May the First Minister Nicola Sturgeon announced an easing of the lockdown in Scotland. From the following day, people were able to meet friends and family outside in groups of no more than eight but keeping two metres apart.

On 19 June, lockdown restrictions were eased to allow the meeting outdoors of up to 8 people from two other households whilst maintaining social distancing. Single people or singles with children could meet with another household indoors without social distancing. Face coverings were made mandatory on public transport. Exercise was permitted within 5 miles of home.

On 29 June, further easing of lockdown with indoor workplaces allowed to open, street access retail and outdoor markets opening, outdoor sports playgrounds, zoos and parks open, outdoor marriages allowed and people can move house – all with social distancing.

On 3 July the 5 mile travel ban was lifted and self contained holiday accommodation allowed to re-open for business. Visits to care homes by one "key visitor" were permitted but meetings had to be outdoors and a 2m distance maintained. Young people under 12 were not required to social distance and 12-17 year olds may meet in groups of up to 8 people provided social distancing was maintained. Beer gardens and outdoor cafes were able to open from 6 July. It was made compulsory to wear face coverings in shops from 10 July.

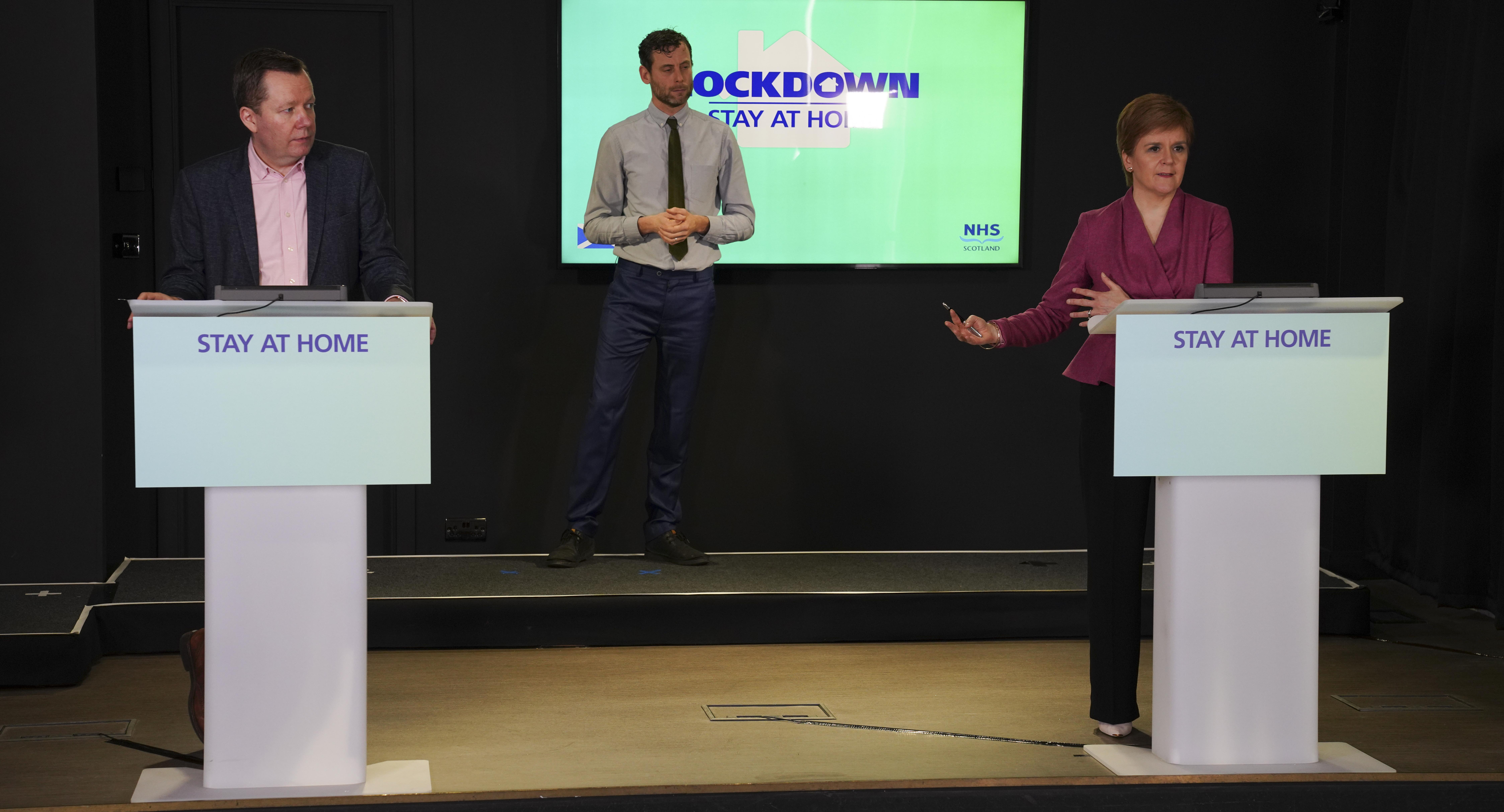
Jason Leitch and Nicola Sturgeon deliver a COVID-19 press conference in January 2021.

On 10 July the Air Bridge system began. Self isolation was not required for people returning from any of 57 countries. This list was similar to, but less than the list of Air Bridges from England and Wales. Up to 15 people from five different households were allowed to meet outdoors whilst maintaining 2m social distancing. Up to 8 people from three households were allowed to meet indoors and people from outside the household could stay overnight.

On 11 August pupils returned to schools. They did not need to socially distance but teachers had to wear masks if they were in close proximity with others and socially distance from other teachers. By 31 August, pupils at high schools were obliged to wear face masks in corridors, canteens and other communal areas.

On 22 September First Minister Nicola Sturgeon announced nationwide restrictions that came into effect on Friday 25 September. These restrictions affected pub closing times and meetings within households.

On 2 November a new, 5-level "tier" system was introduced into Scotland – bringing new, targeted restrictions to different regions of the country.

On 4 January 2021, Nicola Sturgeon announced a lockdown in Scotland which took effect at midnight.

== England ==
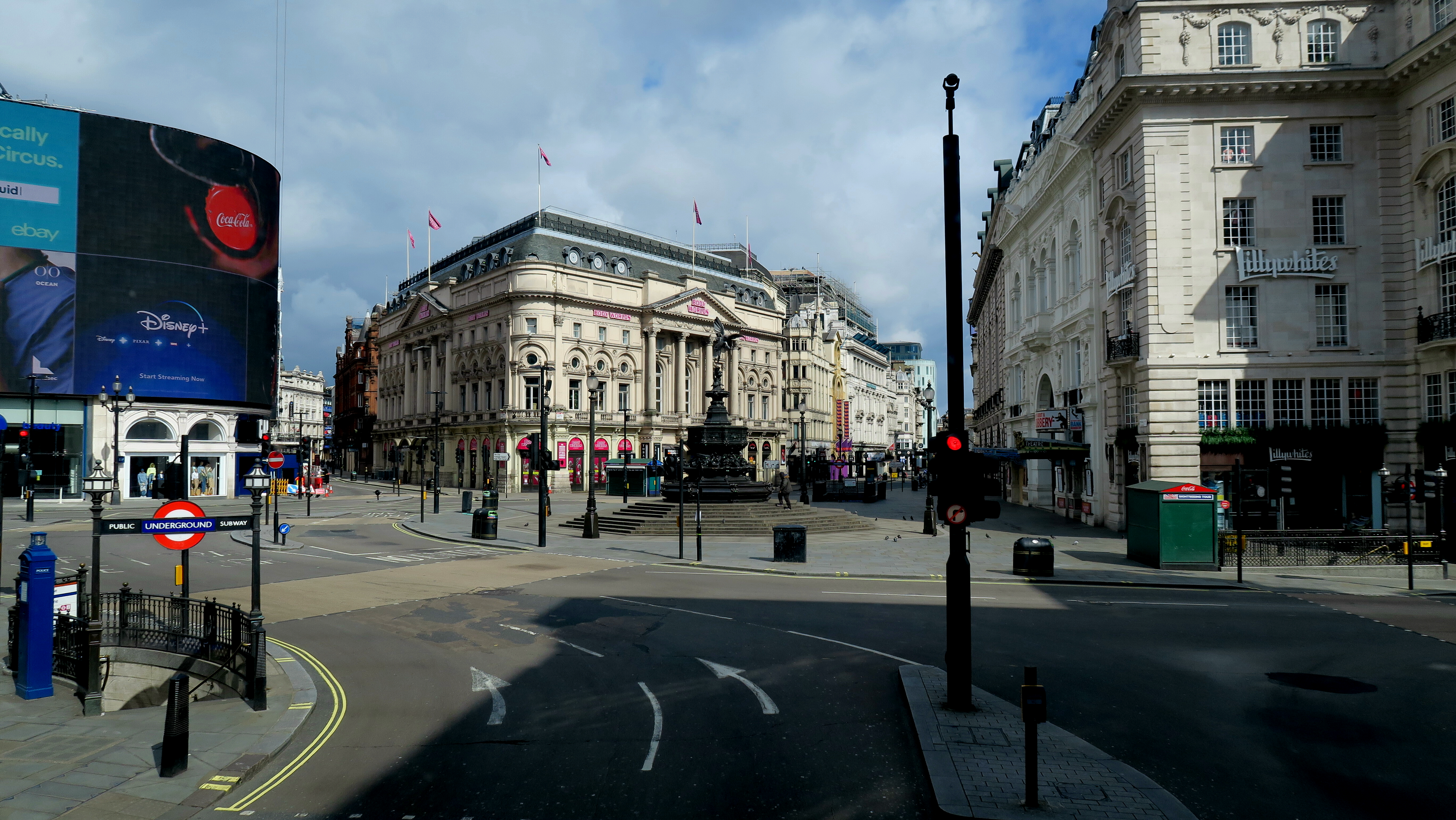
Piccadilly Circus in London during the first COVID-19 lockdown

The slogan changed to "Stay Alert, Control the Virus, Save Lives" and those who could not work from home, including specifically construction and manufacturing workers, were encouraged to return to work albeit avoiding the use of public transport. Additionally, the once-a-day limit on exercise was lifted. The COVID-19 threat level system was introduced, and the "Stay Home" phase was announced to be equivalent to Level 4 (where 1 meant "COVID-19 is not known to be present in the UK", and 5 meant "The circulation of COVID-19 is high and rising exponentially and there is a material risk of healthcare being overwhelmed").

On 13 May 2020, those in England were allowed to meet one other person not from their household outside whilst maintaining a 2-metre social distance, and from 28 May groups of up to six from different households were allowed to meet outside, keeping a safe distance.

From 1 June 2020, English primary schools were encouraged to re-open to Reception, Year 1 and Year 6, and extremely vulnerable people shielding at home were advised it was safe to go outside for once-daily, socially-distanced exercise, for the first time in approximately two months.

From 15 June 2020, non-essential retail reopened, and English secondary schools were asked to prepare to provide Year 10 and Year 12 students with some face-to-face meetings to support their home learning for essential upcoming exams the next year. It also became mandatory to wear face coverings in healthcare settings and on public transport.

On 24 June, the Government issued long-awaited guidance documents to pubs, bars, restaurants, hotels and other licensed premises, detailing how licensed premises could open safely whilst minimising the risk of spreading COVID-19 (applicable to England only).

=== Local lockdowns ===
From Saturday 4 July 2020, most other businesses were allowed to reopen, except for those considered to pose the highest risk such as indoor gyms, and social gathering rules were relaxed further. Most notably, the two-metre rule was relaxed to one metre apart, where other mitigations such as face coverings were being used. The only legal measure that remained, except for face coverings on public transport and in healthcare, was an upper legal limit of 30 on gatherings (except in 'local lockdown' areas, see below), but people were advised to limit gatherings to either two households in any indoor or outdoor, public or private setting, or to a maximum of six, outdoors only, when people gathering were from more than two households.

By Saturday 15 August 2020, most other businesses, including indoor theatres, casinos and bowling alleys, had been allowed to reopen. Nightclubs and sexual entertainment venues, however, remained closed.

Schools reopened full-time from September 2020, and from Wednesday 9 September, the slogan changed once more, to "Hands, Face, Space" reminding the public to wash or sanitize hands often, wear a face covering in enclosed spaces, and keep a space of one metre or more from others, as well as letting fresh air in at public spaces.

=== First tier system ===
Starting on 17 October 2020, the UK government announced that London, among other areas, would move to Tier 2 restrictions, following a spike in cases, banning people from mixing indoors privately.

=== Second lockdown ===
7 days after the lockdown in Wales, on Saturday 31 October 2020, it was announced that a partial lockdown would commence in England from 5 November 2020, to last for 4 weeks up to and including 2 December.

=== Second tier system and third lockdown ===
Through the month of November, mass asymptomatic testing brought the case rate in Liverpool down enough for it to move down from Tier 3 into Tier 2.

After that, a new tiered approach was put into place, to be reviewed on 16 December (with any changes coming into force three days later). For 5 days over the Christmas period (23–27 December), these restrictions are to be relaxed, allowing for three households to meet and form a protective "bubble" during this time period. However this was not the case for residents in and around London as a stricter "Tier 4" was introduced to combat rising cases.

On Monday 4 January 2021, all four Chief Medical Officers and the NHS England Medical Director recommended that the COVID Alert Level should be increased, from level 4 to level 5, indicating that there was a material risk of healthcare services becoming overwhelmed. Later that day, Boris Johnson announced a national lockdown in England, effectively putting all of England into "Tier 4", which took legal effect at 00:01 on 5 January 2021.

=== Lifting measures ===
On Monday 22 February 2021, the UK Government published its 4-step plan to ease lockdown restrictions in England. The first step of the plan, which, amongst other easements, provided for school re-openings, took effect on Monday 8 March. The second step, which involved outdoor activities and trials of indoor activities, took effect on Monday 12 April. The third step, which allowed for limited indoor mixing and the reopening of indoor hospitality venues, took effect on Monday 17 May.

== See also ==
- British government response to the COVID-19 pandemic
- COVID-19 pandemic in the United Kingdom
- Partygate
- COVID-19 lockdowns (by country)
