= Suzanne Brennan Firstenberg =

American artist

Suzanne Brennan Firstenberg (born October 6, 1959) is an American artist. She designed the In America: Remember art installation which placed over 660,000 miniature white flags on the National Mall to represent every American life lost to COVID-19.
