= Nelson A. Rockefeller Park =

Public park in Manhattan

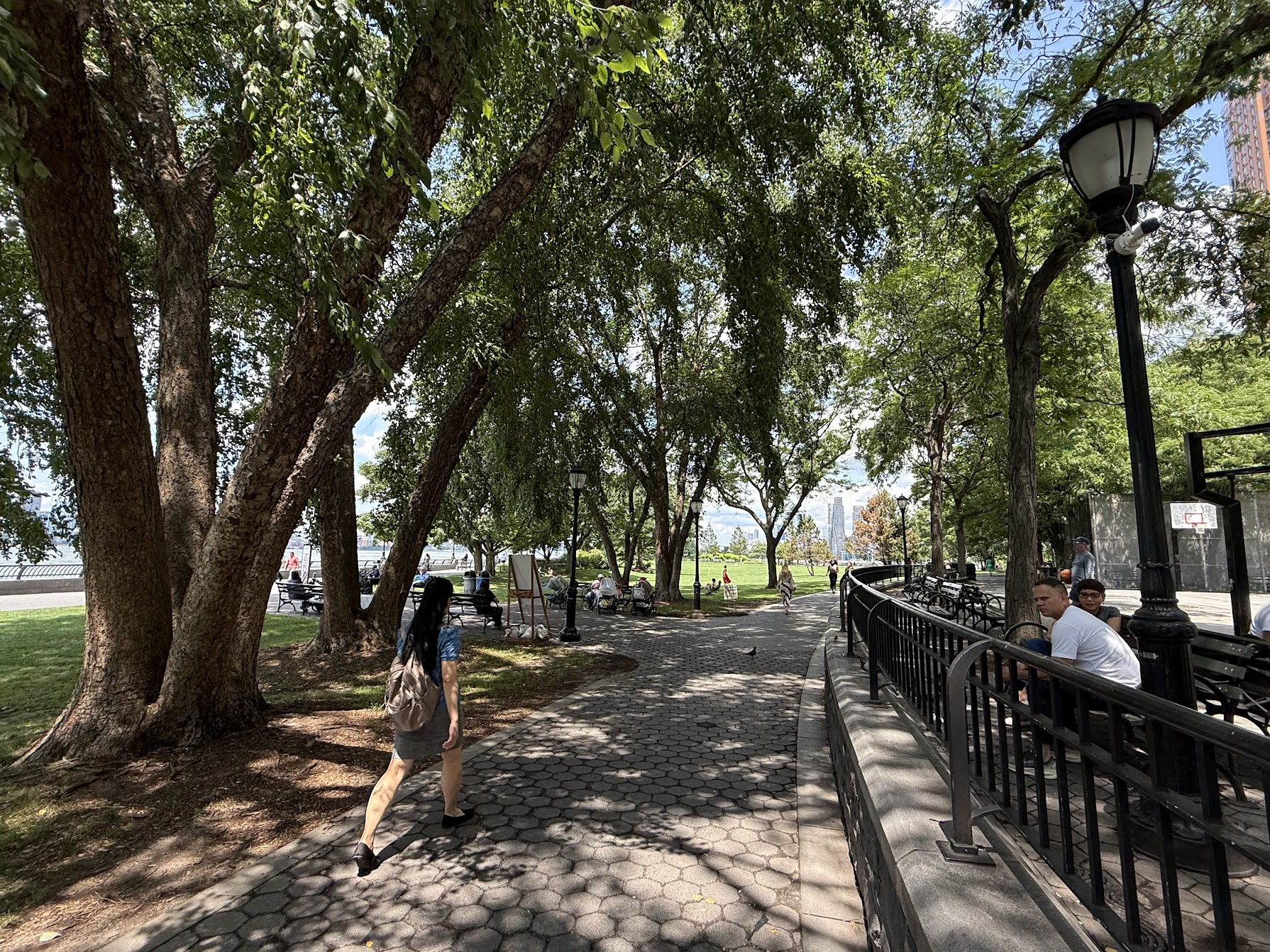
- Rockefeller Park in 2026
- Interactive map of Nelson A. Rockefeller Park
- Type: Urban park
- Location: Battery Park City, Manhattan, New York
- Coordinates: 40°43′04″N 74°00′58″W
- Area: 8.5 acres (0.034 km^{2})
- Opened: 1992
- Operator: Battery Park City Authority

Nelson A. Rockefeller Park is an 8.5-acre public park in Manhattan, the largest outdoor space in the Battery Park City planned development. Constructed atop a former landfill, the park serves as the northern terminus of the 1.2-mile Battery Park Esplanade along the Hudson River. It comprises two terraces that feature several regions, including playgrounds, recreational areas, a large lawn, and a lily pond.

== History ==
In October 1979, the Battery Park City Authority, created by the New York State Legislature eleven years prior, recognized that the neighborhood's "waterfront recreational potential" was a key principle for future development. The master plan identified space for a "north esplanade and park" between Vesey Street and Chambers Street, noting that "fewer office workers and tourists will come this far north so that the character and use of the esplanade can be oriented to the needs of local residential neighborhoods."

The New Yorker reported in 1990 that a park on the north end of Battery Park City would provide a manifestation of Governor Mario Cuomo's vision to give the neighborhood "a soul." The park's central feature was to be "an immense open meadow, surrounded by trees and shrubs." Architects Gary Hack, Steve Carr, and Jim Sandell with the firm Carr, Lynch, Hack and Sandell contracted with the Authority to coordinate the park's design and construction. The firm worked with consultants Oehme, van Sweden & Associates for landscape architecture and Johansson & Walcavage to design the play spaces. The park became the largest open space throughout the Battery Park City project, as well as "the largest green space to be built in Lower Manhattan in decades".

The park opened in spring 1992 and was named for former governor and vice president Nelson Rockefeller, who initiated the Battery Park City urban renewal project in 1966. The New York Observer recounted that the park "quickly became known as one of the city’s best oases, drawing hordes of sun worshipers." The Hudson River Park Conservancy's creation of a bike path linking the esplanade to parkland further north attracted further visitors, including roller-bladers.

In June 2021, Governor Andrew Cuomo announced plans to create an Essential Workers Monument at the northern edge of the park, honoring those who served in frontline roles during the early months of the COVID-19 pandemic. Residents protested the loss of green space, as well as the idea of an open-air “eternal flame.” The following month, Representative Jerry Nadler said the Authority had paused its plans for the tribute.

== Layout ==
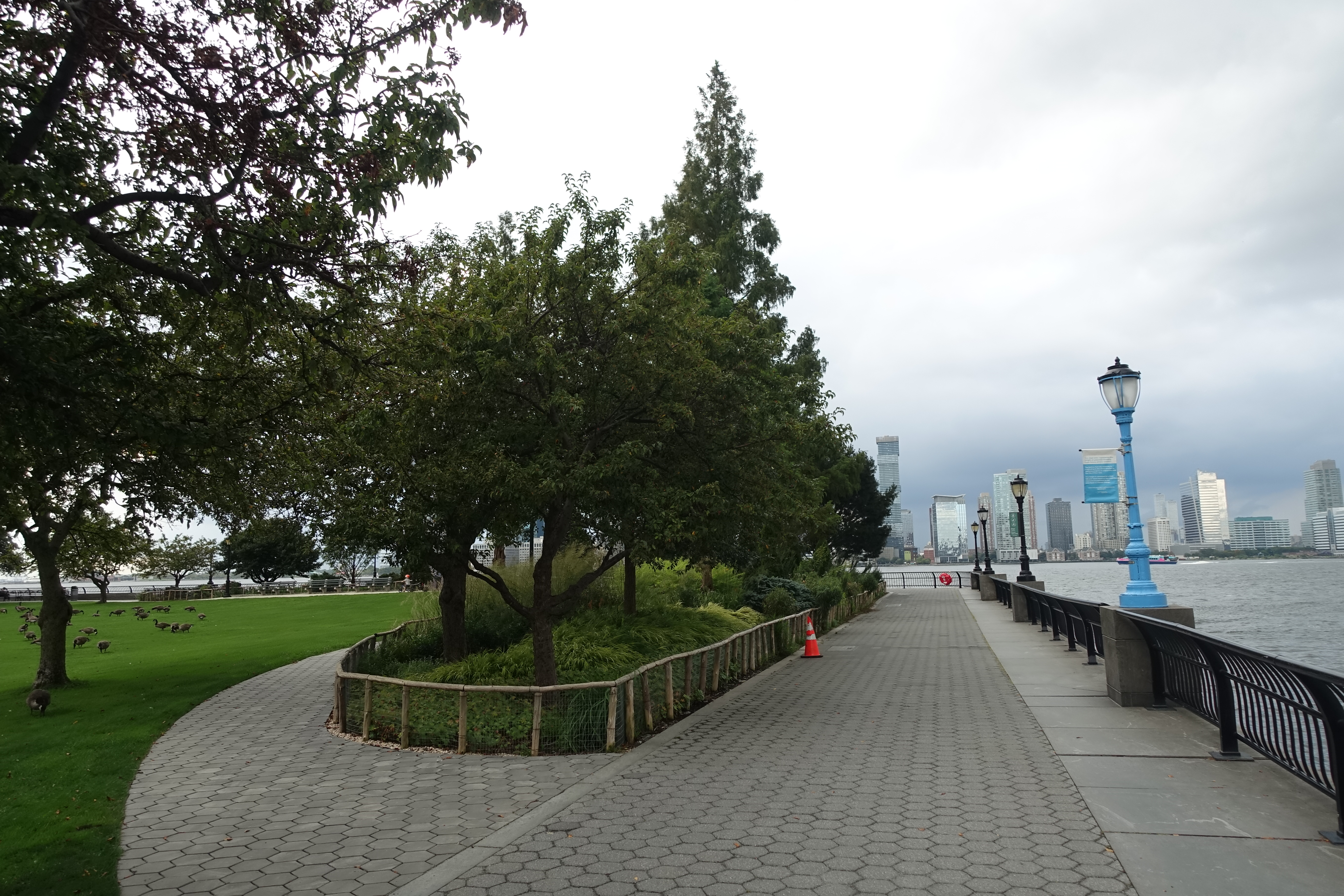
The Esplanade along the park's northern edge

Occupying a narrow parcel on the western edge of Manhattan, the park is bordered by the Hudson River to the north and west, residential development to the east, and Battery Park's North Cove Marina to the south. Two terraces divide the upper and lower sections. The Lily Pond at the park's southern end features a ring of stepped seating. Pathways along the length of the park are lined with stone walls and benches, along with a series of sculptures by artist Tom Otterness and a "pedal-powered carousel."

The park's upper terrace includes a pavilion, ball courts, and a large lawn. A series of curved ramps at the park's northeast edge culminate in a plaza and a grand staircase that connects to Chambers Street. The plaza hosts the Hurricane Maria Memorial, a multicolored glass spiral designed by architect Segundo Cardona and artist Antonio Martorell.
