= National Covid Memorial Wall =

Public mural and COVID-19 memorial in London

Coordinates: 51.500°N 0.120°W

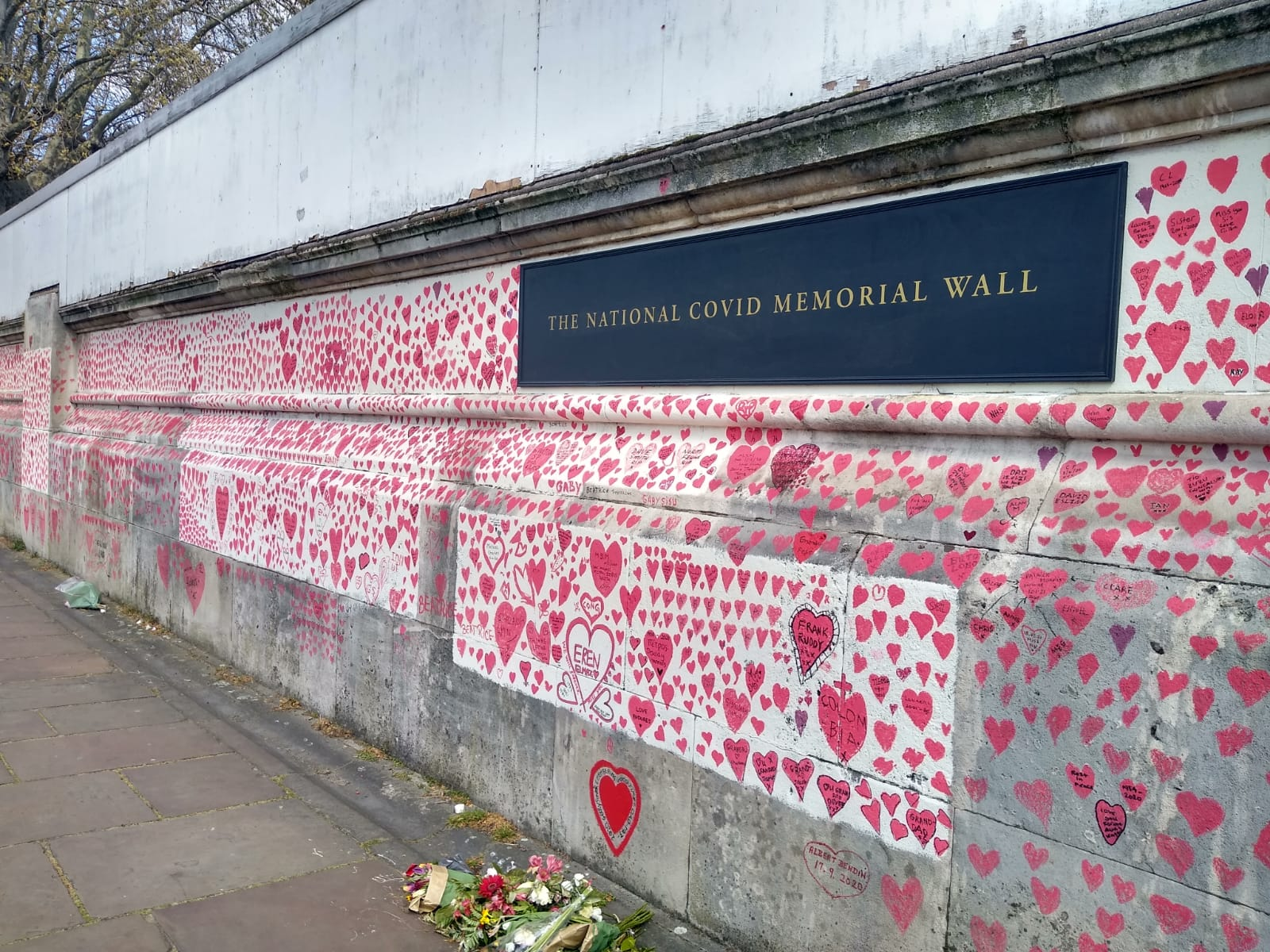
- Section of the National Covid Memorial Wall, April 2021
- Artist: Covid bereaved volunteers and the Friends of the Wall
- Year: 2021
- Subject: COVID-19 pandemic in the United Kingdom
- Dimensions: 500 m (1/3 mi)
- Location: London
- Website: nationalcovidmemorialwall.org

The National Covid Memorial Wall in London is a public memorial painted by volunteers to commemorate victims of the COVID-19 pandemic in the United Kingdom. Started in March 2021 and stretching more than one-third of a mile (540 metres) along the South Bank of the River Thames, opposite the Palace of Westminster, the memorial consists of over 250,000 red hearts, one for each person in the United Kingdom who died with COVID-19 on their death certificate.

In June 2025, The National Covid Memorial Wall became a registered charity with the Charity Commission for England and Wales.

== History ==
The memorial wall was conceived and created by the campaign group Led By Donkeys working in collaboration with Covid-19 Bereaved Families for Justice. Over a thousand volunteers hand-painted approximately 150,000 red hearts over 10 days from 29 March 2021. Bereaved families filled these hearts with messages and the names of lost loved ones, with more continuing to be added over subsequent months. Though the project was started without council permission, it gained widespread support and public recognition. What had been intended as a temporary artistic interpretation of the devastating death toll had become something far more than that, but the Posca pens used to create it were not designed to withstand the elements, and within weeks, the wall of hearts had begun to fade. In August 2021, a small group of bereaved women got together and committed to ensuring that this would not be allowed to happen. Others joined them in their weekly sessions at the wall and eventually the group of ten bereaved volunteers formalised itself as an unincorporated association, The Friends of the Wall. Over time, The Friends of the Wall completely repainted the hearts on the wall with long lasting masonry paint, re-writing dedications, removing graffiti, and adding hearts as the UK death toll continued to mount .

== Location ==
The memorial stretches more than one-third mile (five hundred metres) along the South Bank of the River Thames from Westminster Bridge to Lambeth Bridge, opposite the Palace of Westminster. Being outside of St Thomas' Hospital, it also encompasses an older plaque dedicated to the 1994-6 human BSE outbreak.

== Reactions ==
On 29 March 2021, Labour Party leader Keir Starmer visited the mural, which he described as a "remarkable memorial", before calling on Boris Johnson to visit the mural personally and engage with the families of the deceased. Johnson later visited the wall for "quiet reflection" and was criticised by bereaved families, who said that the visit, which did not include a meeting with them, was "a late evening visit under cover of darkness ... a cynical and insincere move that is deeply hurtful".

== Future of the memorial ==
In March 2023, the Commission for Covid Commemoration (headed by Baroness Nicky Morgan) recommended to the government that the wall be made a permanent memorial. Discussions began between the Friends of the Wall (the bereaved volunteers who maintain the wall), the DCMS, St. Thomas’ Hospital, and the local planning authority to explore how to work together to ensure this unique memorial can be preserved.

On 13 November 2025, it was announced in the House of Lords that The National Covid Memorial Wall would be made a permanent national memorial.

== Gallery ==
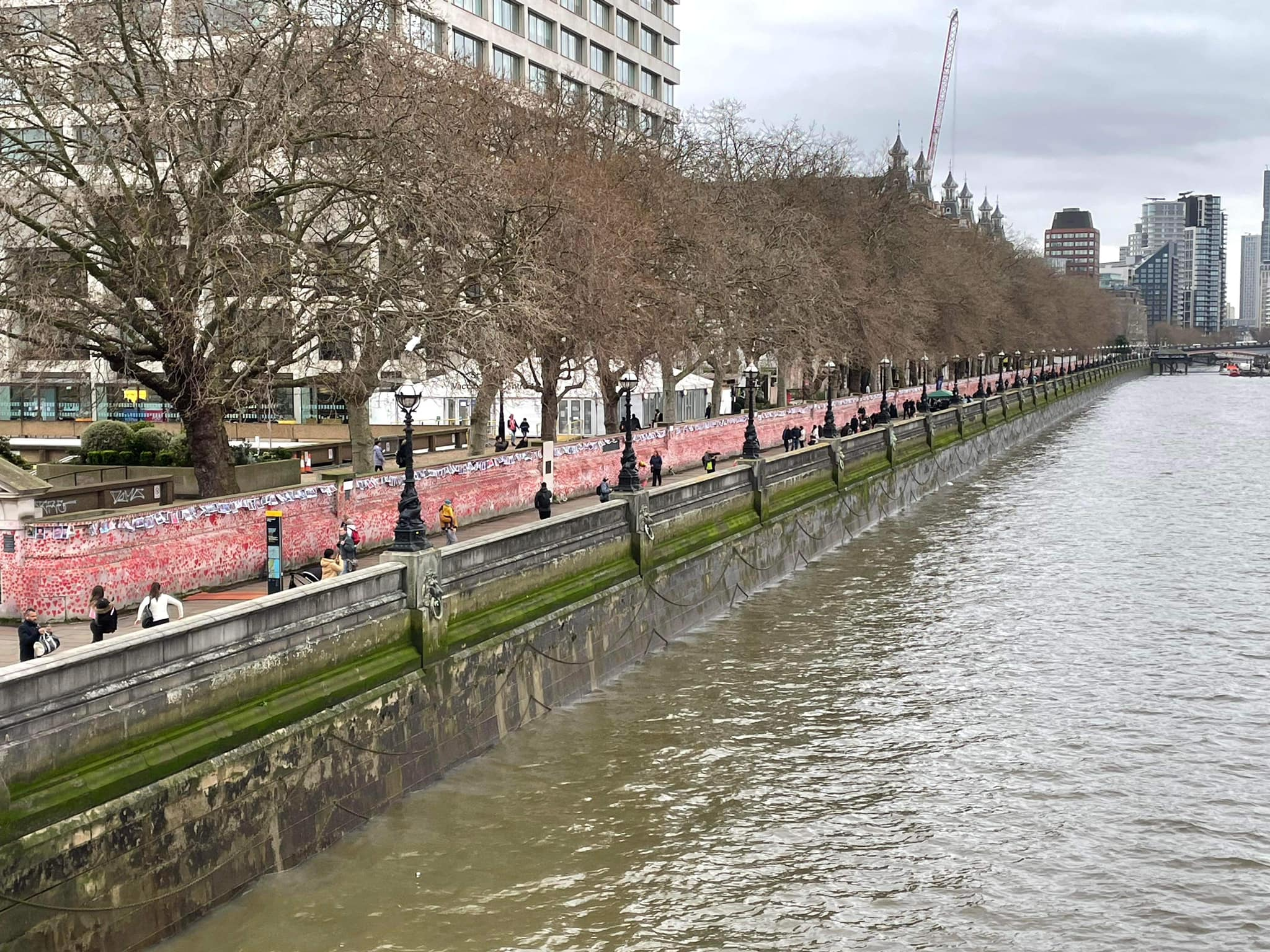
The National Covid Memorial Wall seen from Westminster Bridge

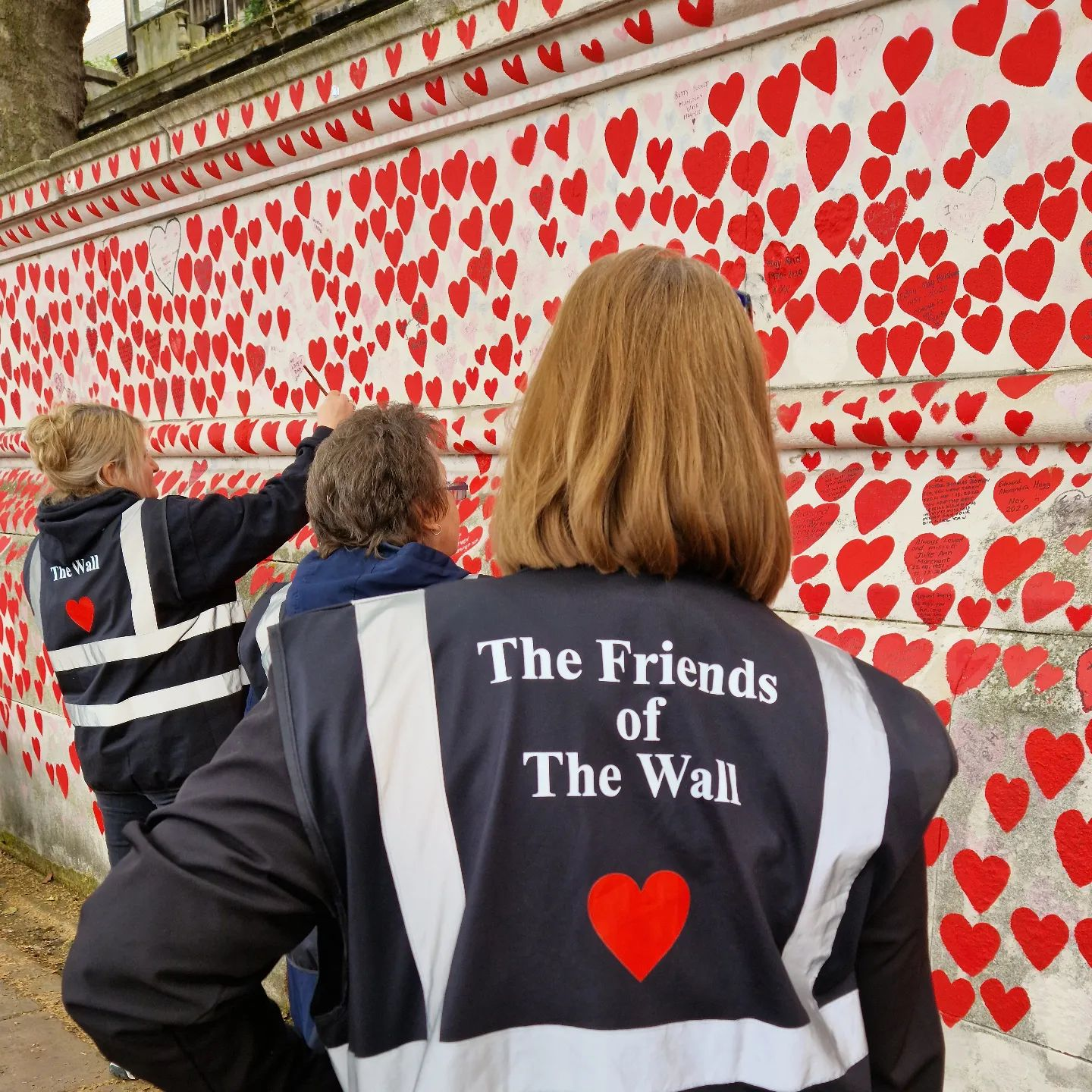
Volunteers painting hearts at the National Covid Memorial Wall

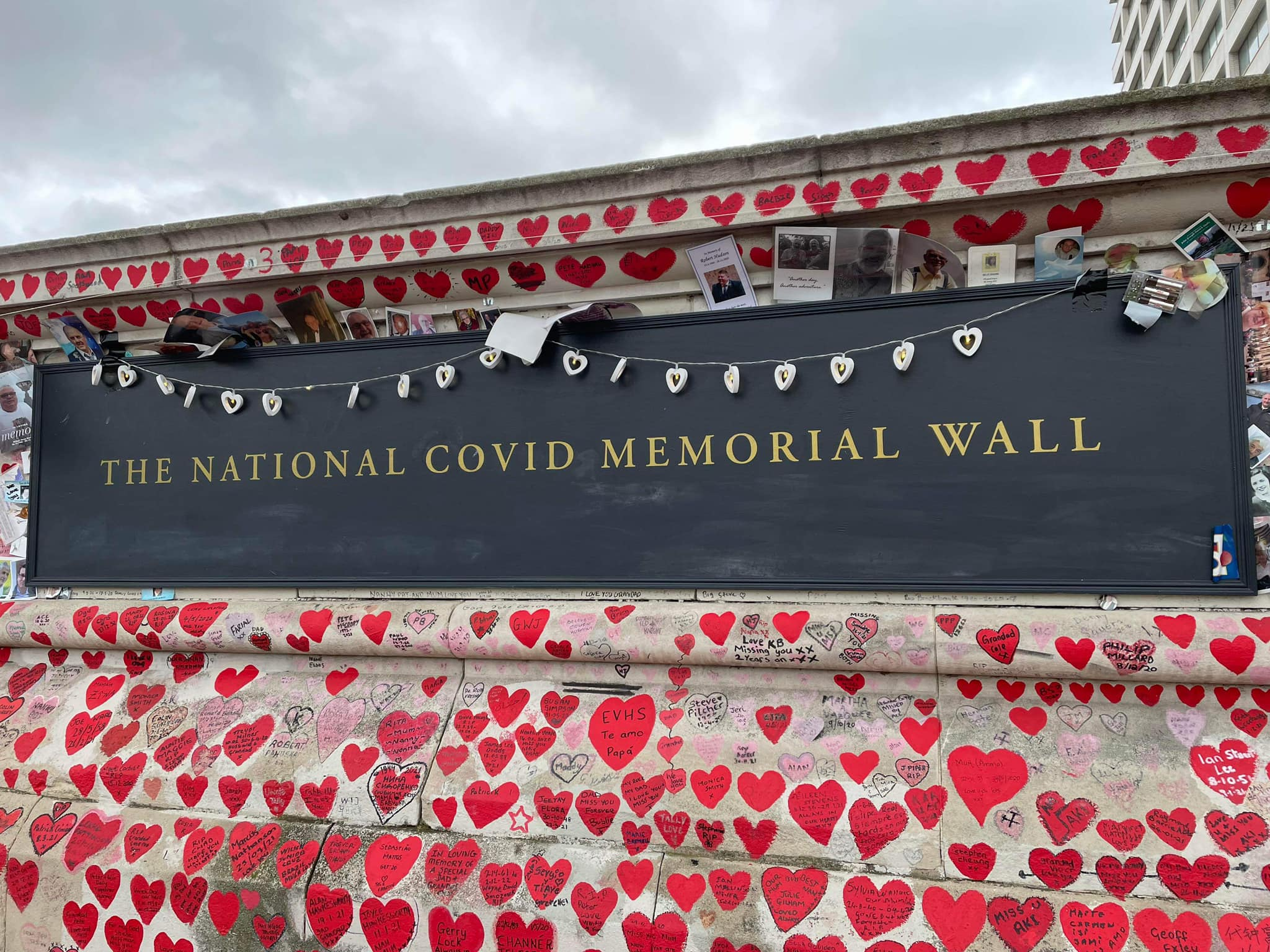
One of the plaques of the National Covid Memorial Wall

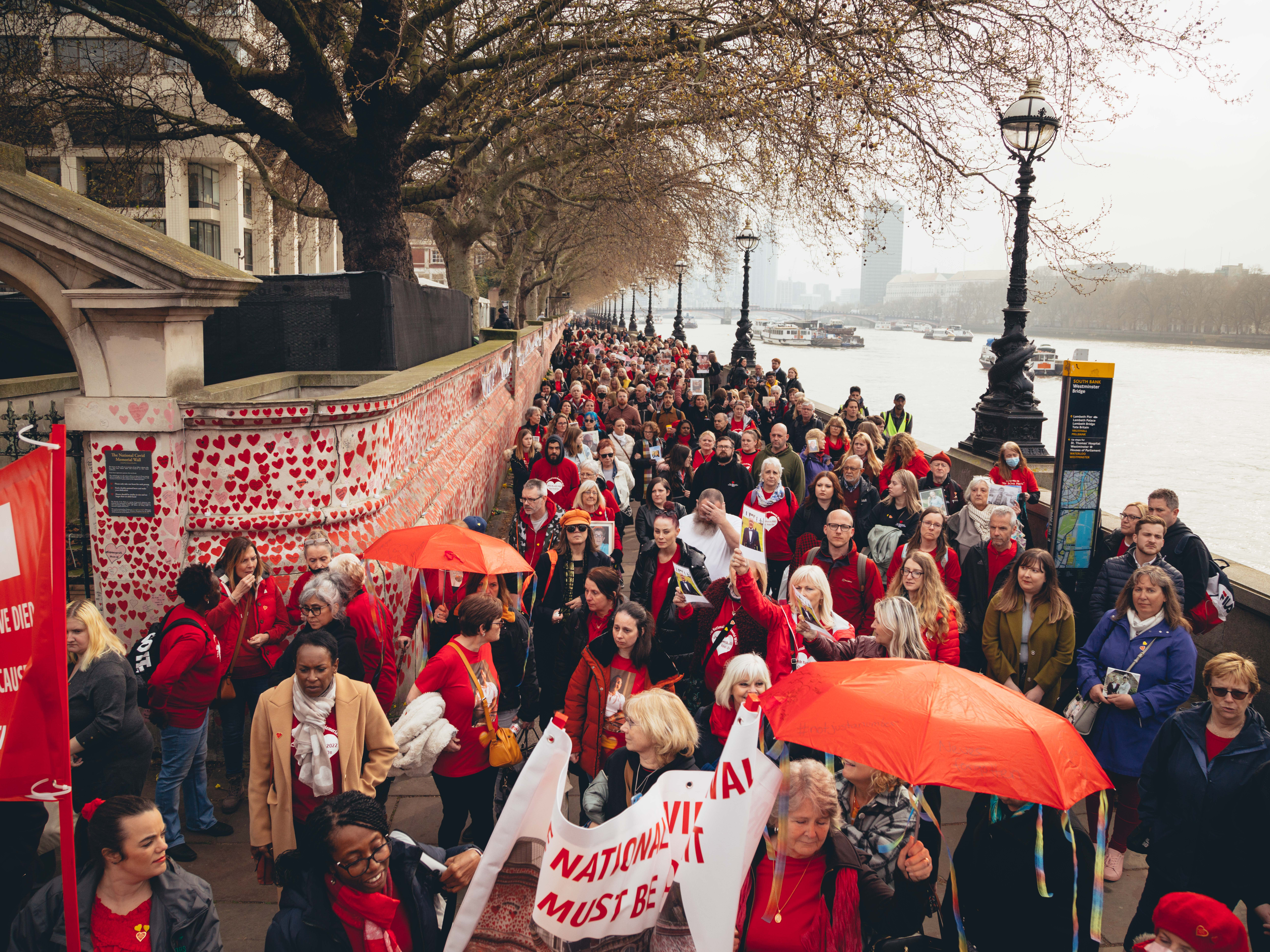
First anniversary of the National Covid Memorial Wall

== See also ==
- List of public art in the London Borough of Lambeth
- London COVID-19 Pandemic Memorial Garden
