= Monument in Memory of the Victims of the COVID-19 Pandemic =

Monument in Madrid, Spain

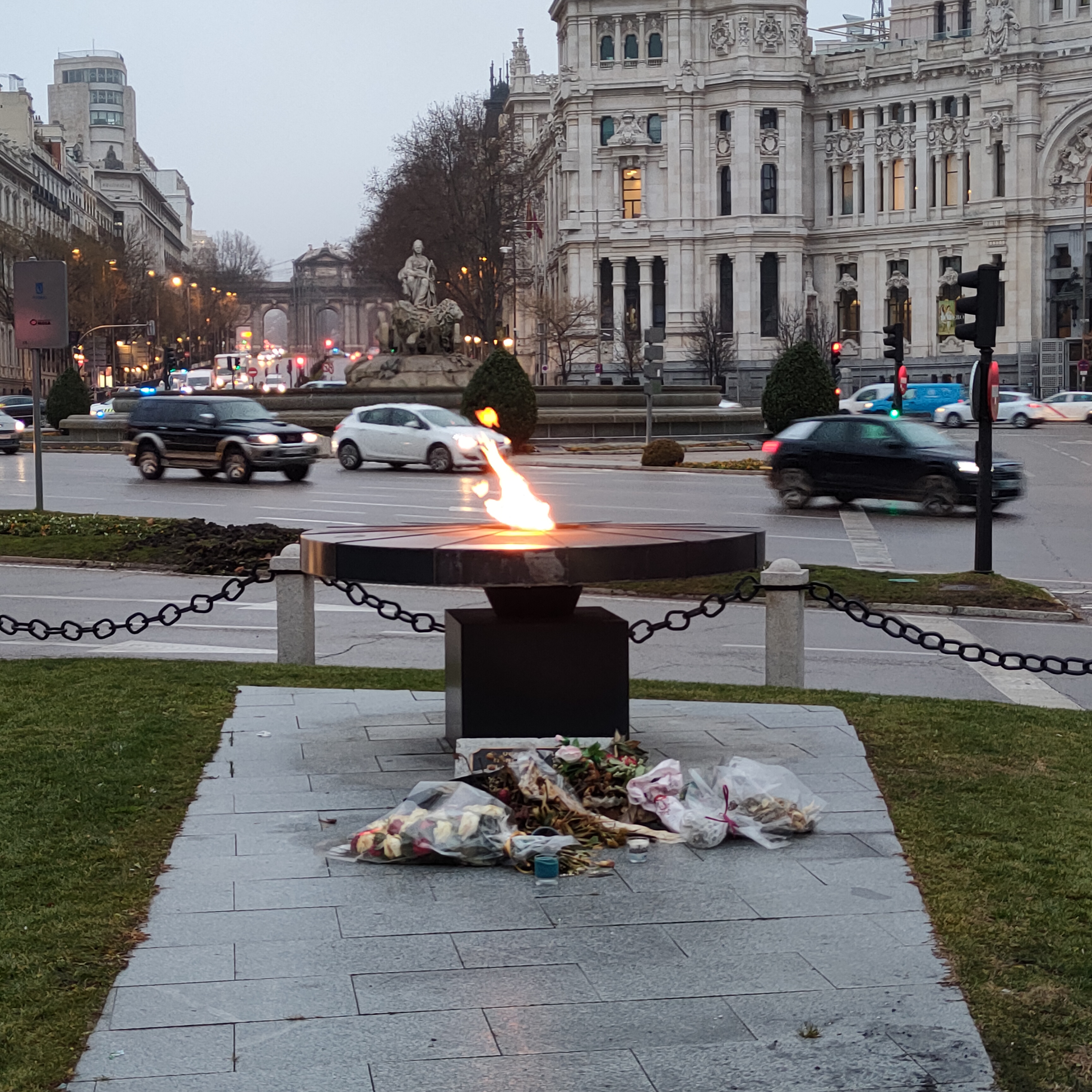
- The monument in 2021.
- Interactive map of Monument in Memory of the Victims of the COVID-19 Pandemic
- Location: Alcalá Street, Madrid, Spain
- Coordinates: 40°25′09″N 03°41′38″W
- Designer: Carlos Rubio Carvajal
- Type: Sculpture
- Material: Steel
- Width: c. 2 m
- Opening date: 15 May 2020
- Dedicated to: Deceased during the COVID-19 pandemic

The Monument in Memory of the Victims of the COVID-19 Pandemic (Spanish: Monumento en recuerdo de las víctimas de la pandemia del COVID-19) is a steel sculpture in Madrid, Spain, located within the district of Retiro, at the intersection of Alcalá Street and Prado Walk. It commemorates people who died during the 2020 COVID-19 pandemic. The monument was designed by Carlos Rubio Carvajal, and unveiled on 15 May 2020.

== History ==
The monument was designed by architect Carlos Rubio Carvajal, and unveiled on 15 May 2020.

== Characteristics ==
The monument is placed at Alcalá Street, at the intersection with Prado Walk, and in front of the Cybele Palace. It is located in the administrative neighbourhood of Jerónimos of the district of Retiro. Made of black steel, it consists of a circle that is almost 2 m in diameter, and which rests on a prism. On the circular piece is the Spanish inscription "Vuestra llama nunca se apagará en nuestro corazón" (translation: Your flame will never go out in our hearts). The same inscription is also on a plaque mounted in front of the monument. From its centre is burning a constant flame. Originally, it was fueled with propane cylinders, which were later replaced with gas, to keep it permanent.
