= COVID-19 Memorial Monument of Honor, Remembrance and Resilience =

Public memorial in Chicago, Illinois, US

Coordinates: 41.8719°N 87.6769°W

The COVID-19 Memorial Monument of Honor, Remembrance and Resilience is a public memorial in the Illinois Medical District of Chicago, Illinois. The monument consists of three illuminated stainless steel sculptures designed to commemorate the global impact of the COVID-19 pandemic, and honor healthcare workers and frontline workers who responded to the crisis. The monument was unveiled on October 27th, 2026.

== Design ==
The memorial is at 2023 West Ogden Avenue in Chicago's Near West Side, occupying a one-acre triangular plot at the intersection of West Ogden Avenue, South Damen Avenue, and West Polk Street. The site lies between the John H. Stroger Jr. Hospital and the Jesse Brown VA Medical Center within the Illinois Medical District, which represents the nation's oldest and largest concentration of healthcare facilities. The monument is surrounded by a newly developed green space featuring benches.

The monument's design features three interconnected sculptures reaching 25 feet in height, crafted from stainless steel with multi-colored illumination. Each sculpture was designed to resemble both a dandelion puff and a SARS-CoV-2 virus particle, the former representing the pandemic's worldwide reach.

== History ==
The project was first planned by the COVID-19 Monument Commission, established in 2021 by art historian Sally Metzler and operating under the Hektoen Institute of Medicine. After running a competition in 2023 to select the memorial's design, the commission awarded Casey Schachner, a Georgia Southern University art professor, $20,000 for her winning concept.

The site preparation began with the demolition of the former Easter Seals building in mid-2025.
