= London Blossom Garden =

COVID-19 memorial garden

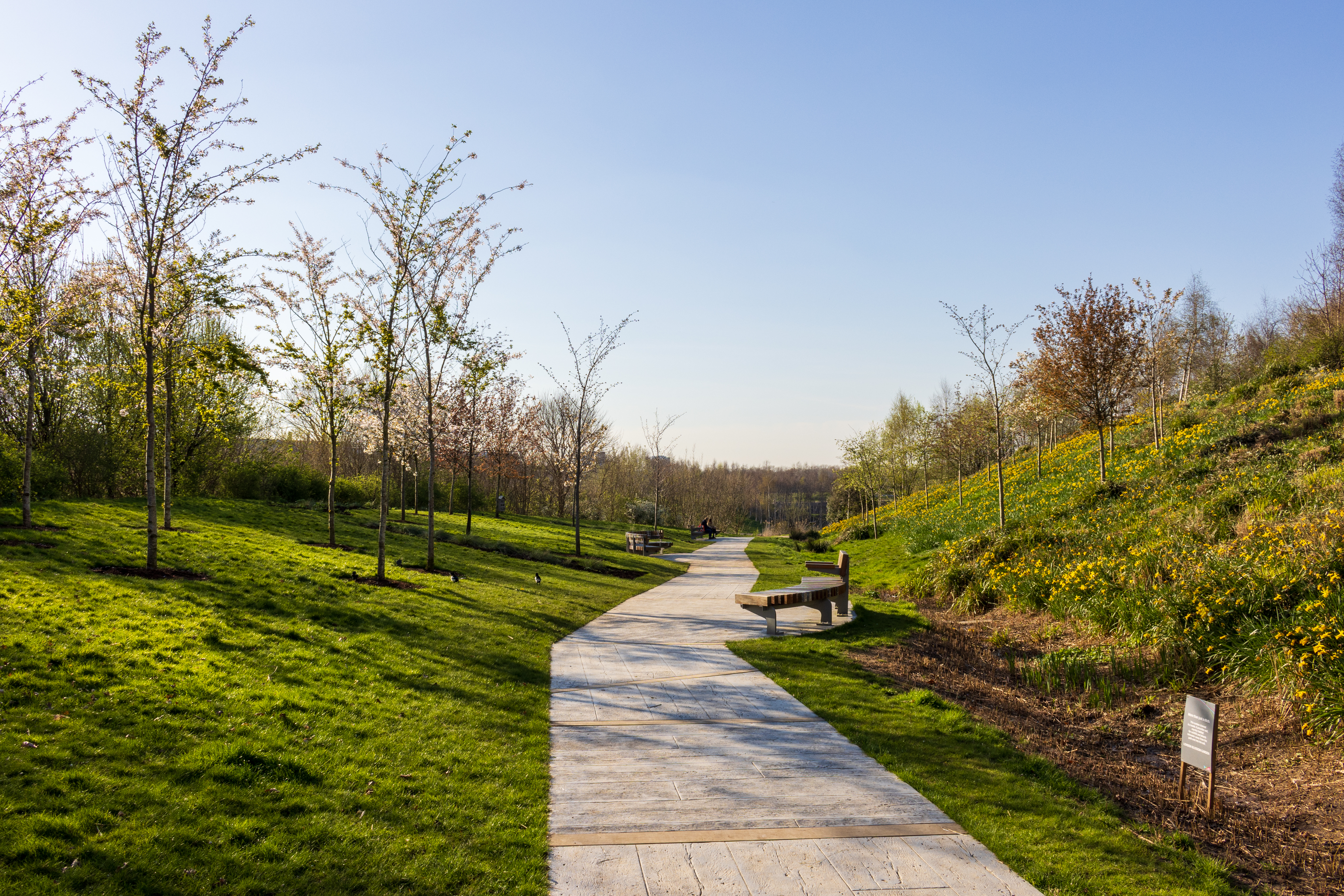
- London Blossom Garden in April 2023
- Interactive map of London Blossom Garden
- Location: London, United Kingdom
- Coordinates: 51.5472°N 0.01569°W
- Type: Memorial
- Material: Blossom trees
- Dedicated to: Victims of the COVID-19 pandemic in London

The London Blossom Garden is a memorial garden to honour the victims of the COVID-19 pandemic in London, England, planted near the London Stadium in the London Borough of Newham. The memorial represents the 32 boroughs of London and the City of London by three circles formed of 33 blossom trees. The blossom trees were chosen as the pandemic began in London in March 2020, in the springtime. It was planted by the National Trust and funded by Bloomberg L.P.

The Mayor of London, Sadiq Khan, said "While we continue to battle the virus we are creating a lasting, living memorial to commemorate those who have lost their lives, pay tribute to the amazing work of our key workers and create a space for all Londoners to reflect on the experience of the pandemic". The memorial is intended to stand as "a symbol of how Londoners have stood together to help one another".

== See also ==
- National Covid Memorial Wall
