= In America: Remember =

Temporary public art installation

Coordinates: 38.8915°N 77.0345°W

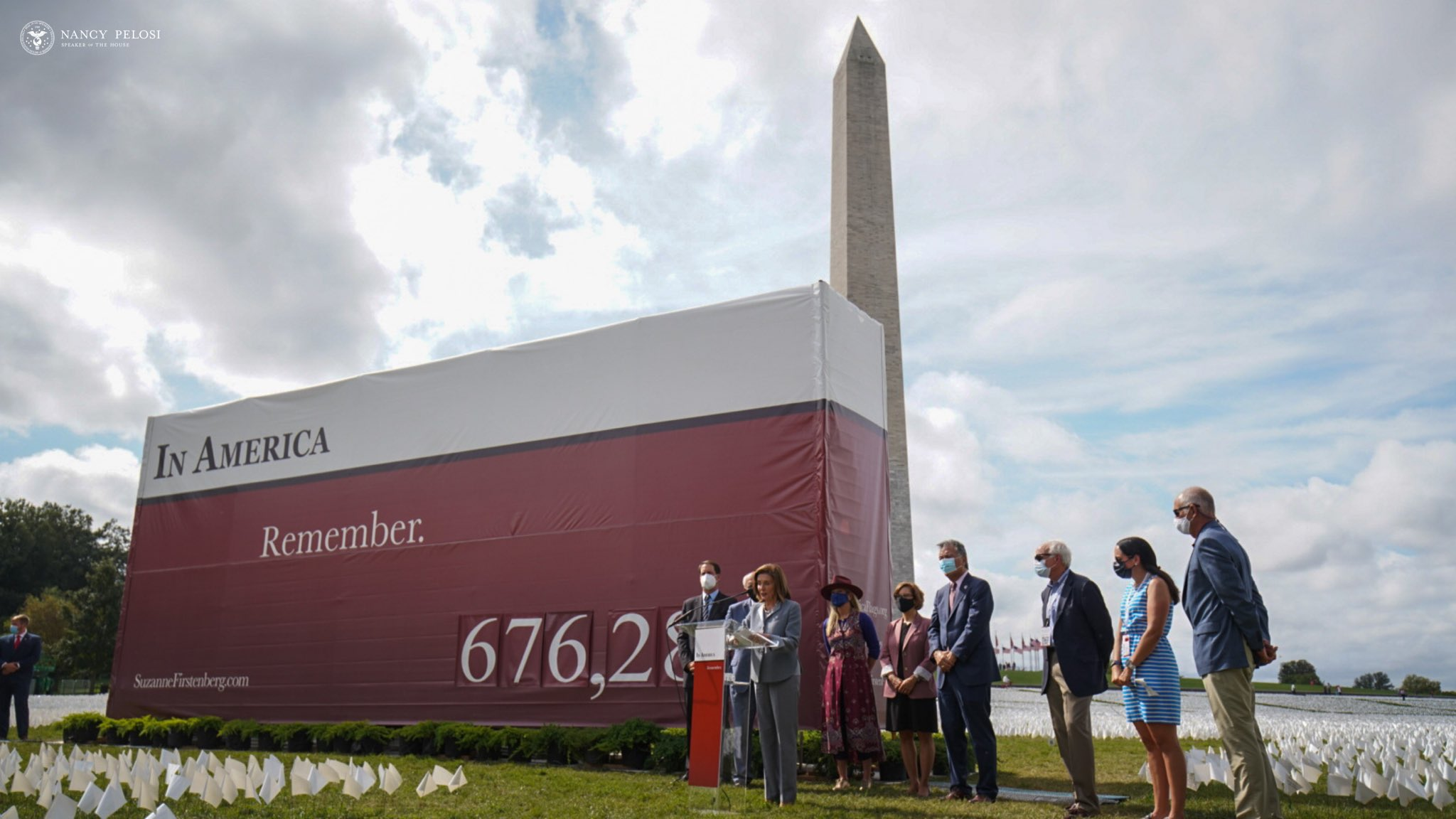
- Speaker of the House Nancy Pelosi at the installation
- Location: Washington, D.C.

In America: Remember was a public art installation by American artist Suzanne Brennan Firstenberg. The exhibition, on display from September 17 to October 3, 2021, in Washington, D.C., honored Americans who died in the COVID-19 pandemic by blanketing a portion of the National Mall near the Washington Monument with over 600,000 small white flags, one for each life lost. The number of flags rose to 701,133 by the end of the exhibition, reflecting the updated death toll.

== Description ==
In America: Remember was a followup to a previous outdoor installation by Firstenberg near the D.C. Armory and RFK Stadium in 2020, titled In America: How Could This Happen... The original exhibition contained over 200,000 white plastic flags echoing the appearance of the headstones of Arlington National Cemetery, and reflected the estimated death toll from COVID-19 in the United States at that time. Flags from the 2020 exhibition were collected by the Smithsonian Institution for the National Museum of American History. After that exhibition was complete, Firstenberg contacted the National Park Service to create a larger version at the National Mall.

The 2021 version of the memorial covered 20 acres (8.1 hectares) of grass on the National Mall with 630,000 white flags initially, and also contained a large billboard displaying the number of Americans who had lost their lives to COVID-19. Both the number of flags and the number on the display were updated during the exhibition to reflect the increasing death toll.

Visitors to the physical installation as well as to its website were invited to dedicate personalized messages to those they had lost. Volunteers would then write the names of the deceased along with the messages on individual flags at the installation. The location of each flag, as well as a photo of the flag and its personalized message, could be seen on the exhibition's website, along with a live webcam of the exhibition.
