= Essential Workers Monument =

Proposed monument in New York City, U.S.

The Essential Workers Monument is a planned memorial in New York City, United States, commemorating key workers for their work during the COVID-19 pandemic.

== History ==
In June 2021, Andrew Cuomo, governor of New York state, announced that the memorial would be located in Battery Park City's Rockefeller Park, along the waterfront with views of the Statue of Liberty. The proposed $3 million "Circle of Heroes" design included 19 red maple trees around an "eternal flame". The monument's location faced opposition due to the process and location; plans would have called for removing existing trees and covering grass with concrete for the pathway. Protestors wanted to preserve the existing green space. Cuomo planned to install the memorial in a different location.

In July 2021, the Battery Park City Essential Workers Monument Advisory Committee was formed to help identify a new location. It comprises seventeen people representing various neighborhood constituencies as well as state officials and essential workers.

In September 2021, Governor Kathy Hochul expressed interest in completing the memorial.
