= COVID-19 pandemic in London =

- Disease: COVID-19
- Pathogen: SARS-CoV-2
- Location: London, England, UK
- First outbreak: Wuhan, Hubei, China
- Arrival date: 12 February 2020
- Confirmed cases: 1,228,614 (up to 16 November 2021)
- Hospitalised cases: 1,094 (active, as of 15 November 2021); 87,586 (total, up to 13 November 2021)
- Ventilator cases: 184 (active, as of 15 November 2021)
- Recovered: no data
- Deaths: 15,019 (hospital deaths, up to 27 July 2021); 16,897 (deaths within 28 days of positive test, up to 15 November 2021); 19,665 (deaths within 60 days of positive test, up to 10 November 2021); 20,501 (deaths with COVID-19 on the death certificate by date of death, up to 29 October 2021)
- Fatality rate: 193.6 (death rate per 100,000 population who died within 28 days of the first positive test); 229.6 (death rate per 100,000 population whose death certificate mentioned COVID-19)

Government website
- www.london.gov.uk/coronavirus

The first case relating to the COVID-19 pandemic in London, England, was confirmed on 12 February 2020 in a woman who had recently arrived from China. By March 2020, there had been almost 500 confirmed cases in the city, and 23 deaths; a month later, the number of deaths had topped 4,000.

London was initially one of the worst affected regions of England. As of 16 February 2023, there had been 3,129,342 cases, and 184,255 deaths of patients who tested positive for COVID-19 in London hospitals. This underestimates the total deaths attributable to COVID-19; up to 1 May 2020, only 76% of deaths in London involving COVID-19 occurred in hospitals. The city's poorest boroughs – Newham, Brent and Hackney – were the hardest hit areas in terms of deaths per 100,000 population. Harrow and Brent had excess death rates over three times the national average.

== Timeline ==
=== 2020 ===
The first confirmed case of COVID-19 in London was detected on 12 February 2020, in a woman who had arrived from China with the virus a few days earlier. She was the ninth known case in the UK.

By 17 March 2020, there had been almost 500 confirmed cases in London and 23 deaths, and Mayor of London Sadiq Khan announced that, owing to the virus, the London Underground would begin running a reduced service. A day earlier UK Prime Minister Boris Johnson had stated that London's outbreak was a few weeks ahead of the rest of the UK. The city had seen the most cases of any UK region, with numbers rising much faster than elsewhere in the UK.

ONS data showed 5,901 deaths in London due to COVID-19 in the four weeks to 24 April.

Initially, Southwark and Westminster were the worst affected boroughs. By 18 April, the five worst affected boroughs were Brent (1,160 cases), Croydon (1,140), Barnet (1,055), Southwark (1,053) and Lambeth (998). On 3 June, the five worst affected boroughs were Croydon (1,511), Brent (1,478), Barnet (1,299), Bromley (1,281), and Southwark (1,274).

On 1 May, Office for National Statistics (ONS) data showed the death rates in London's poorest boroughs were the highest in the UK, with Newham – 144.3 deaths per 100,000 people – the highest, followed by Brent (141.5), and Hackney (127.4).

By 18 June, Sixteen of the 20 British local authorities recording the highest excess death rates were in London. Harrow and Brent had excess death rates over three times the national average, at 64% and 63% respectively.

On 25 September 2020, London was placed on the national coronavirus watchlist following a rise in cases.

By 6 October, due in part to an upsurge in testing, London's infection rate was more than 1,000 new COVID-19 cases a day, with 16 boroughs reporting more than 60 new cases per 100,000 people. Two days later, 8 October 2020, the Evening Standard reported that in the week to 4 October 2020 the capital city had recorded 6,723 new COVID-19 infections, an infection rate increase of 58.2% on the previous week.

A London COVID-19 Pandemic Memorial Garden was announced in late November; it will be planted near the London Olympic Stadium in the Borough of Newham. It will consist of three circles formed from 33 blossom trees.

By December, COVID-19 cases in London had begun to rise again significantly following surges across parts of the UK, and by the end of the month London emergency services were equivalently busy to the level during the previous Spring peak, with the NHS Nightingale temporary hospital on standby. The alert level in the capital was elevated to "tier 4", with accompanying restrictions, over the course of the month, with these highest restrictions applying from 20 December following an announcement on the 19th.

=== 2021 ===
On 8 January 2021, London Mayor Sadiq Khan declared the COVID-19 crisis in London a "major incident" with "out of control" spread, as infection rates for London were estimated to be around 1 in 30, with highs of 1 in 20 in some parts of the city.

By 12 December 2021, the infectious Omicron variant of COVID-19 was beginning to spread in London, with a third of the capital's cases being attributed to the variant at this date.

On 18 December 2021, another "major incident" was declared in London by the Mayor due to the rapid rise in Omicron variant cases, leading to the largest number of daily cases recorded for the city since the pandemic began at 26,000.

== Response by sector ==
=== National Health Service ===
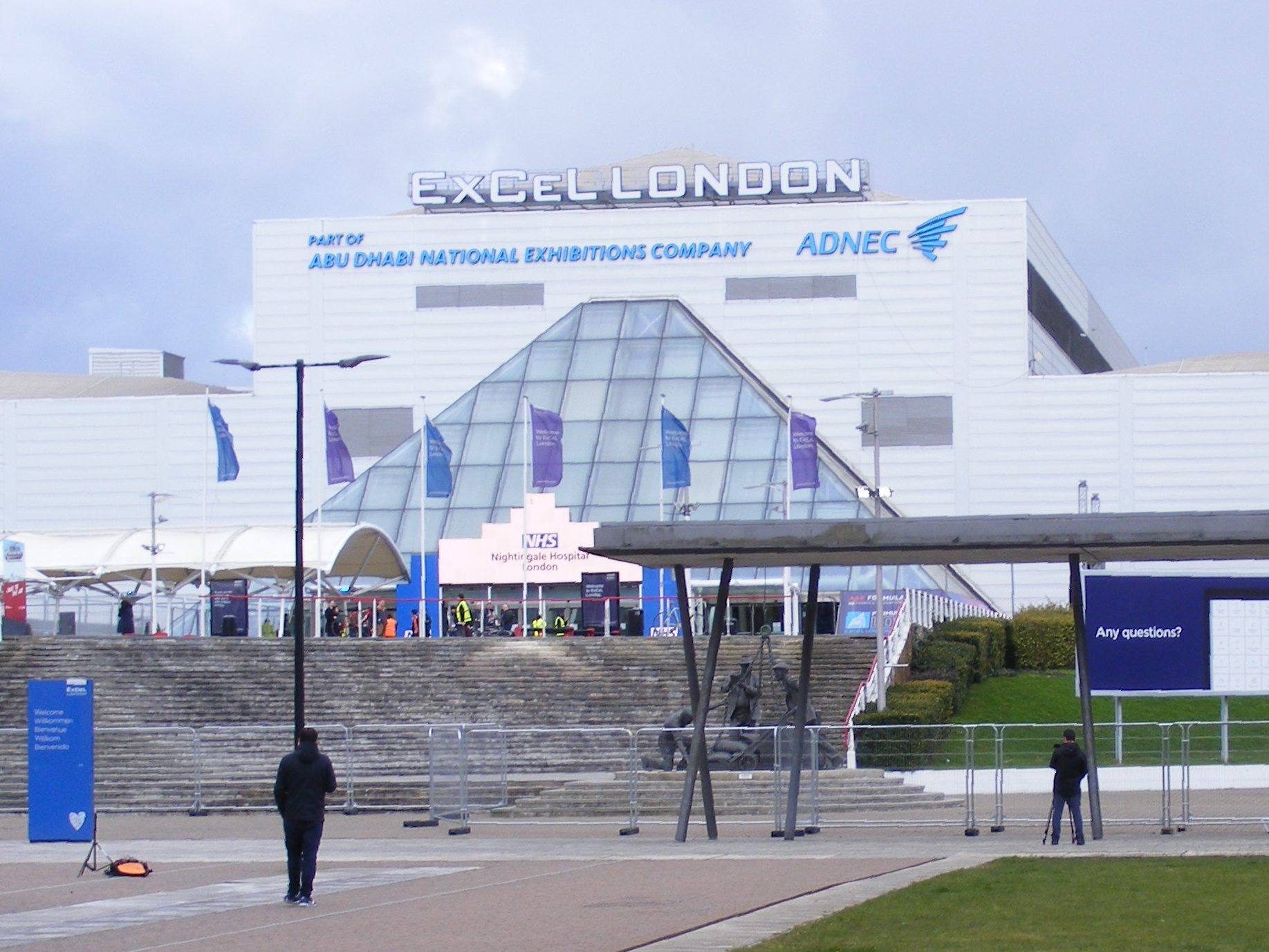
NHS Nightingale Hospital London

With a high number of cases, older populations and lower number of pre-COVID-19 critical care beds, district general hospitals, located around the centre of London were found in an analysis by Edge Health, to have experienced significant demand. On the evening of 19 March, Northwick Park Hospital in Harrow said it had no critical care capacity left and was contacting neighbouring hospitals about transferring patients who need critical care to other sites. On 4 April, Watford General Hospital also declared a "critical incident".

Meanwhile, on 24 March, health secretary Matt Hancock said that a temporary new hospital, the NHS Nightingale Hospital, was to be opened in the ExCeL Centre in east London the following week. This critical care hospital would provide up to 4,000 extra critical care beds for London. The London hospital opened on 3 April, and received its first patients on 7 April. As other London hospitals increased critical care capacity, the Nightingale hospital treated 51 patients in its first three weeks, and on 4 May was set to be placed "on standby", accepting no further patients.

The number of people in London hospitals for COVID-19 peaked on 11 April, according to week-on-week change data.

=== Public transport ===
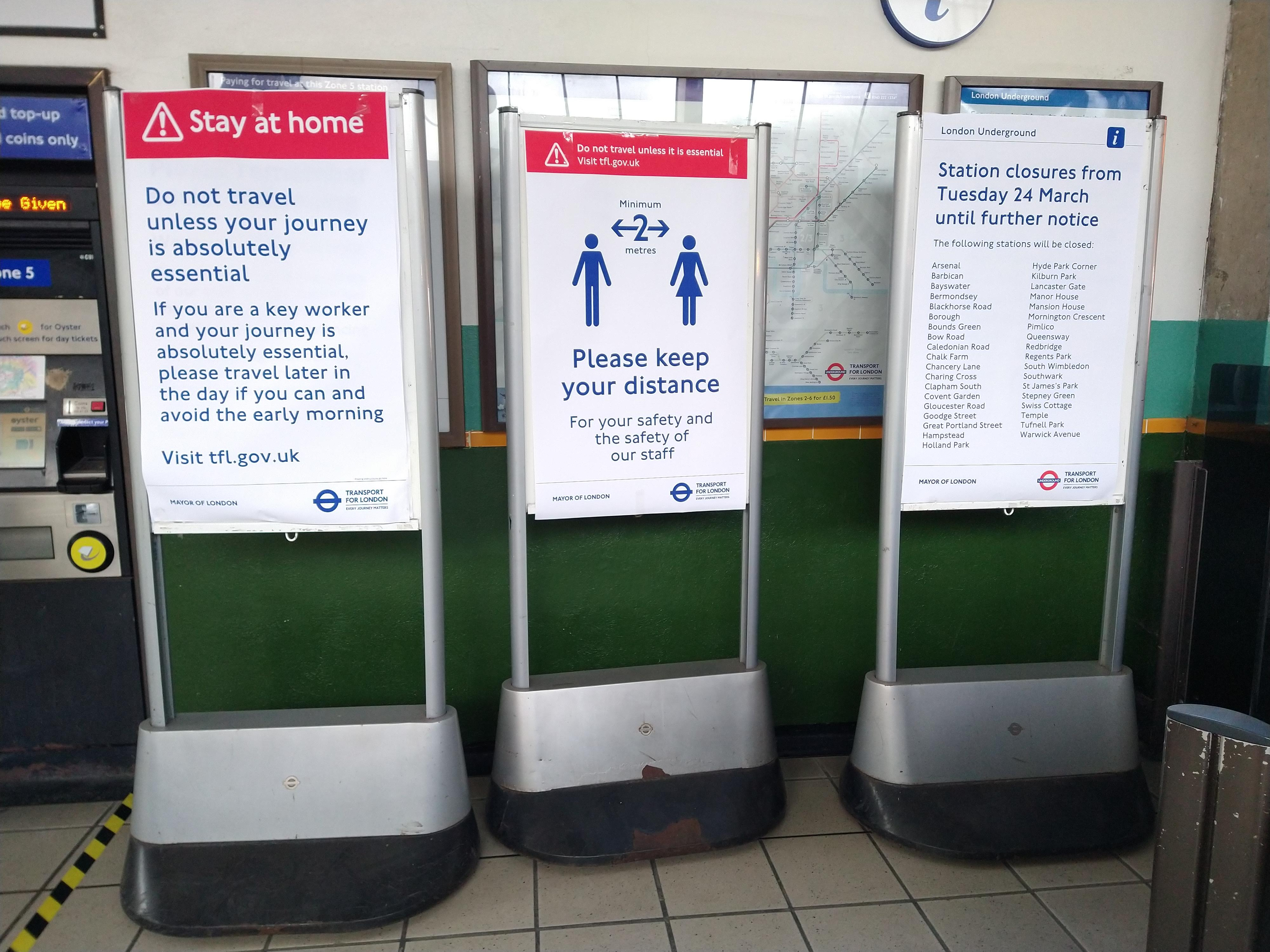
Stay at home and social distancing notices London Underground March 2020

The Waterloo & City line, several tube stations and the Night Tube were suspended on 19 March, with the Mayor of London and Transport for London (TfL) urging people to only use public transport if absolutely essential so that it can be used by critical workers. From 20 March, 40 tube stations were closed. From 25 March, London Underground measures to combat the spread of the virus by slowing the flow of passengers onto platforms included the imposition of queuing at ticket gates and turning off some escalators.

On 20 March, Southeastern became the first train operating company to announce a reduced timetable, which would come into use from 23 March. From 30 March, the Gatwick Express service was suspended due to significantly reduced demand for travel to the airport.

On 21 March, TfL closed the Emirates Air Line cable car until further notice.

On 25 March, London City Airport announced it would temporarily close due to the coronavirus outbreak. Heathrow Airport closed one runway from 6 April, while Gatwick Airport closed one of its two terminals, and said its runway would open for scheduled flights only between 2pm and 10pm.

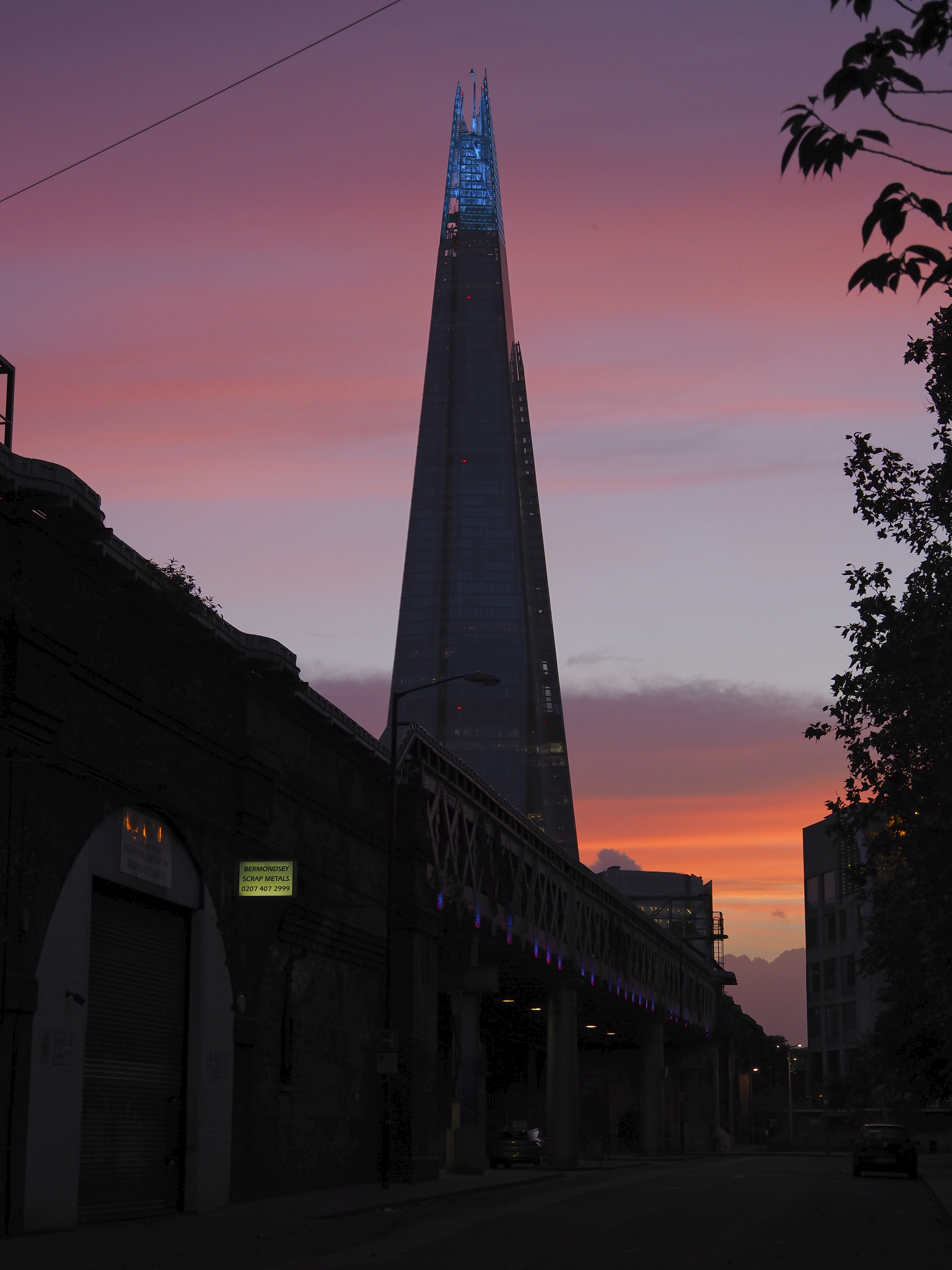
The Shard illuminated in blue to support the NHS in May 2020

In April, TfL trialled changes encouraging passengers to board London buses by the middle or rear doors to lessen the risks to drivers, after the deaths of 14 TfL workers including nine drivers. This measure was extended to all routes on 20 April, and passengers were no longer required to pay, so they did not need to use the card reader near the driver.

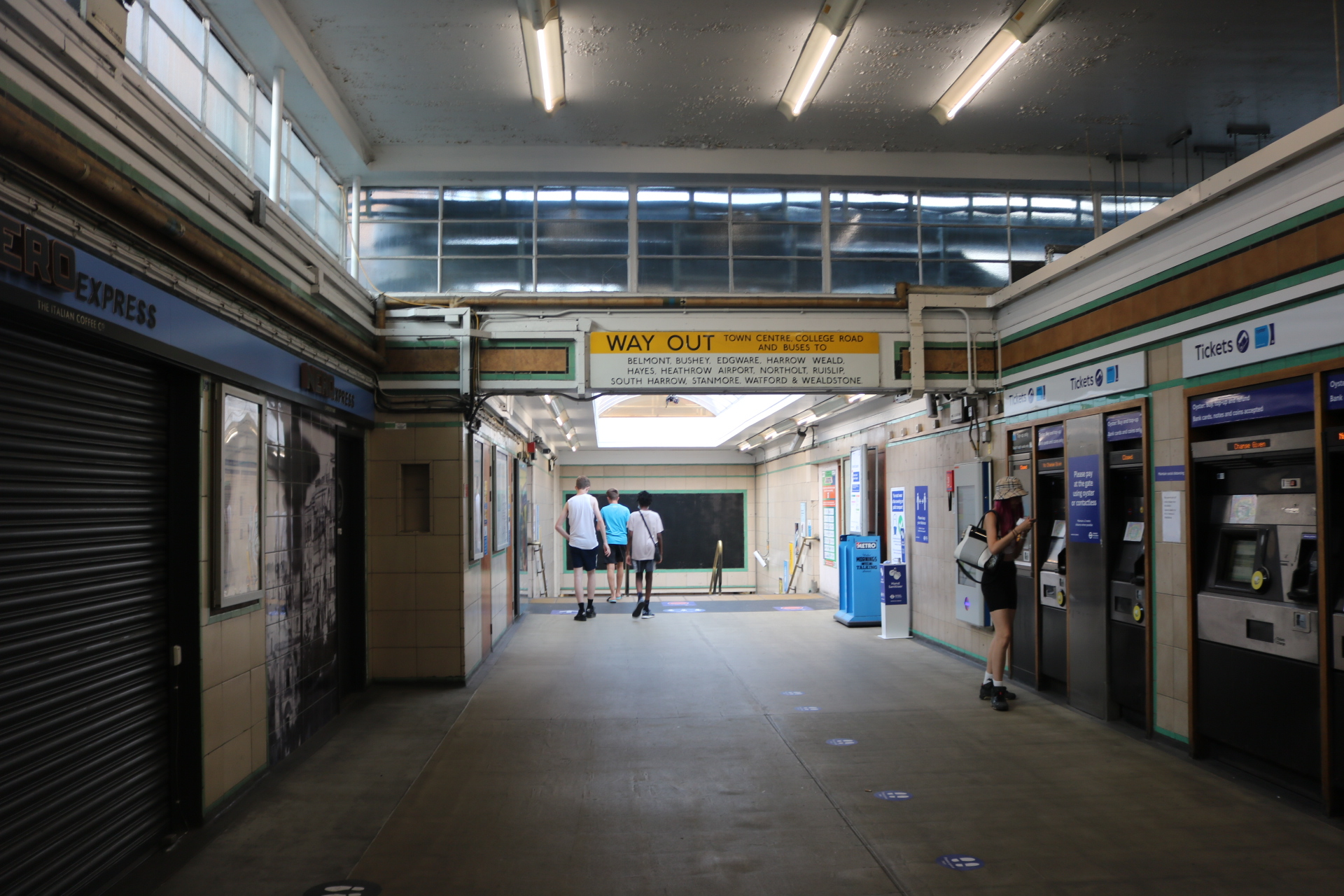
A barren Harrow-on-the-Hill station during the pandemic in August 2020

On 22 April, London mayor Sadiq Khan warned that TfL could run out of money to pay staff by the end of April unless the government stepped in. Two days later, TfL announced it was furloughing around 7,000 employees, about a quarter of its staff, to help mitigate a 90% reduction in fare revenues. Since London entered lockdown on 23 March, Tube journeys had fallen by 95% and bus journeys by 85%, though TfL continued to operate limited services to allow "essential travel" for key workers. Without government financial support for TfL, London Assembly members warned that Crossrail, the Northern line extension and other projects such as step-free schemes at tube stations could be delayed. On 7 May, it was reported that TfL had requested £2 billion in state aid to keep services running until September 2020. On 12 May, TfL documents warned it expected to lose £4bn due to the pandemic and said it needed £3.2bn to balance a proposed emergency budget for 2021, having lost 90% of its overall income. Without an agreement with the government, deputy mayor for transport Heidi Alexander said TfL might have to issue a "Section 114 notice" – the equivalent of a public body going bust. On 14 May, the UK Government agreed £1.6bn in emergency funding to keep Tube and bus services running until September.

On 14 July 2021, London Mayor Sadiq Khan announced that unlike in the rest of England where the legal obligation to wear face masks on public transport was due to end at the start of the following week mask wearing would continue to be compulsory on Transport for London facilities.

=== Education ===
By 17 March, most universities in London had suspended face-to-face learning or were planning to do so by 23 March, many moving classes online. It was announced on 18 March that schools in London would close by 20 March, as in the rest of the UK.

During the third wave of infections in the UK in early 2021, a third lockdown was introduced in England with all schools shutting down until 8 March at the earliest.

== See also ==
- COVID-19 pandemic in the United Kingdom
- COVID-19 pandemic in England
