= Grade I and II* listed buildings in the London Borough of Lambeth =

There are over 9,000 Grade I listed buildings and 20,000 Grade II* listed buildings in England. This is a list of these buildings in the London Borough of Lambeth.

== Grade I ==
Name	Location	Type	Completed (Note: The date given is the date used by Historic England as significant for the initial building or that of an important part in the structure's description.)	Date designated	Grid ref. (Note: Sometimes known as OSGB36, the grid reference is based on the British national grid reference system used by the Ordnance Survey.) Geo-coordinates	Entry number (Note: The "List Entry Number" is a unique number assigned to each listed building and scheduled monument by Historic England.)	Image
Christ Church, Streatham	Streatham Hill	Church	1840–42	14 July 1955	TQ3063873401; 51°26′40″N 0°07′18″W	1358233	Christ Church, Streatham More images
Church of All Saints	West Dulwich	Church	1888–91	27 March 1981	TQ3234273129; 51°26′30″N 0°05′50″W	1064976	Church of All Saints More images
Church of St John the Divine	Kennington	Church	1870–74	19 October 1951	TQ3161777099; 51°28′39″N 0°06′22″W	1357964	Church of St John the Divine More images
Lambeth Palace	Lambeth	Ecclesiastical, ceremonial, defensive and residential buildings	c. 1835	19 October 1951	TQ3060779093; 51°29′45″N 0°07′12″W	1116399	Lambeth Palace More images
Royal Festival Hall	South Bank	Concert hall	1963–64	29 March 1988	TQ3079780223; 51°30′21″N 0°07′00″W	1249756	Royal Festival Hall More images
Statue of Robert Clayton by Grinling Gibbons	Lambeth (The statue is in the Millennium Garden on the river front of St Thomas' Hospital, next to north entrance to the North Wing.)	Statue	1714	30 May 1979	TQ3062379615; 51°30′01″N 0°07′10″W	1319925	Statue of Robert Clayton by Grinling Gibbons More images

== Grade II* ==
Name	Location	Type	Completed	Date designated	Grid ref. Geo-coordinates	Entry number	Image
Brockwell Hall	Brockwell Park	Villa	1816	5 September 1975	TQ3171373935; 51°26′57″N 0°06′21″W	1080511	Brockwell Hall More images
Bronze Statue of Edward VI at St Thomas' Hospital	Lambeth (The statue is inside St Thomas' Hospital between the North Wing and the South Wing, before Central Hall.)	Statue	1736	30 May 1979	TQ3062879480; 51°29′57″N 0°07′10″W	1080372	Bronze Statue of Edward VI at St Thomas' Hospital More images
Brunswick House	30 Wandsworth Road, Vauxhall	House	Late 18th century	26 March 1973	TQ3018177864; 51°29′05″N 0°07′36″W	1357952	Brunswick House More images
Christ Church	Brixton Road, SW9	Church	1907	19 October 1951	TQ3114477090; 51°28′39″N 0°06′47″W	1358218	Christ Church More images
Church of Holy Trinity	Clapham Common	Church	1774–1776	14 July 1955	TQ2916575361; 51°27′45″N 0°08′31″W	1080491	Church of Holy Trinity More images
Church of St John with All Saints	Waterloo Road, Waterloo SE1	Church	1823–24	19 October 1951	TQ3113380093; 51°30′16″N 0°06′43″W	1357954	Church of St John with All Saints More images
Church of St Luke	Norwood High Street, West Norwood	Church	1822	27 March 1981	TQ3193272074; 51°25′56″N 0°06′13″W	1116506	Church of St Luke More images
Church of St Mark	Kennington Park Road, Kennington Oval	Church	1822–24	19 October 1951	TQ3120677520; 51°28′53″N 0°06′43″W	1080383	Church of St Mark More images
Church of St Mary	Lambeth Road, Lambeth (now Garden Museum)	Church	1377	19 October 1951	TQ3059779013; 51°29′42″N 0°07′12″W	1080380	Church of St Mary More images
Church of St Matthew	Brixton Hill, Brixton	Church	1822–24	19 October 1951	TQ3098875093; 51°27′35″N 0°06′57″W	1080532	Church of St Matthew More images
Church of St Paul	Rectory Grove, Clapham	Church	1815	14 July 1955	TQ2926776074; 51°28′08″N 0°08′25″W	1121980	Church of St Paul More images
Church of St Peter, Leigham Court Road	Streatham	Church	1871	27 March 1981	TQ3115072004; 51°25′55″N 0°06′53″W	1065037	Church of St Peter, Leigham Court Road More images
St Peter's Church, Kennington Lane	310 Kennington Lane, Vauxhall	Church	1863–64	22 October 1974	TQ3072278103; 51°29′12″N 0°07′07″W	1358276	St Peter's Church, Kennington Lane More images
Forecourt Walls, Railings and Gate to Number 23 Old Town	Clapham	Gate	Early 19th century	27 March 1979	TQ2922175649; 51°27′54″N 0°08′28″W	1323174	Forecourt Walls, Railings and Gate to Number 23 Old Town
Forecourt Walls, Railings and Gates to Numbers 12 to 21 (consecutive) Clapham Common Northside	Clapham Common, Lambeth	Gate	18th century	27 March 1981	TQ2903875349; 51°27′45″N 0°08′38″W	1080494	Upload Photo
Former St Peter's School	38 St Oswald's Place, Kennington	Schoolmaster's House	1860–61	27 January 1981	TQ3072678133; 51°29′13″N 0°07′07″W	1064944	Former St Peter's School More images
Front Walls, Railings and Gates to Numbers 39,41 and 43 Old Town	Clapham	Gate	Early 19th century	27 March 1979	TQ2922875549; 51°27′51″N 0°08′28″W	1065001	Front Walls, Railings and Gates to Numbers 39,41 and 43 Old Town
Herbert House	312 Kennington Lane, Kennington	Orphanage/clergy training college	1860–62	27 March 1981	TQ3070678085; 51°29′12″N 0°07′08″W	1185572	Herbert House More images
Lodge at Entrance to Kennington Park	Kennington	Model Houses for Four Families	1851	8 September 1961	TQ3136277849; 51°29′04″N 0°06′34″W	1185790	Lodge at Entrance to Kennington Park More images
Main Block of the County Hall	South Bank	County Hall	1911–33	19 October 1951	TQ3065979791; 51°30′07″N 0°07′08″W	1358192	Main Block of the County Hall More images
Mausoleum of Richard Budd in Grounds of Church of St Matthew	Brixton Hill, Brixton	Mausoleum	1824	27 March 1981	TQ3098975193; 51°27′38″N 0°06′57″W	1080574	Mausoleum of Richard Budd in Grounds of Church of St Matthew More images
Old Vic Theatre	Waterloo	Theatre	1816–18	19 October 1951	TQ3132779813; 51°30′07″N 0°06′34″W	1068710	Old Vic Theatre More images
Pullman Court	1–218 Streatham Hill, Streatham	Flats	1933–35	16 January 1981	TQ3046473252; 51°26′36″N 0°07′27″W	1064939	Pullman Court More images
Roman Catholic Chapel of Corpus Christi	Brixton Hill	Roman Catholic Church	1886	27 January 1981	TQ3075574673; 51°27′21″N 0°07′10″W	1080535	Roman Catholic Chapel of Corpus Christi More images
Roman Catholic Church of St Mary (church of the Redemptionist Fathers)	Clapham Park Road, Clapham	Roman Catholic Church	1849–51	8 February 1979	TQ2949075270; 51°27′42″N 0°08′15″W	1358240	Roman Catholic Church of St Mary (church of the Redemptionist Fathers) More images
Roman Catholic Church of the English Martyrs	Mitcham Lane, Streatham	Roman Catholic Church	Built 1892–94	27 March 1981	TQ2996671648; 51°25′44″N 0°07′55″W	1357894	Roman Catholic Church of the English Martyrs More images
Royal National Theatre	South Bank	Workshop	1969–76	23 June 1994	TQ3101380383; 51°30′26″N 0°06′49″W	1272324	Royal National Theatre More images
St Mary's Redemptorist Monastery	Clapham Park Road, Clapham	Monastery	Late 19th century	8 February 1979	TQ2948875230; 51°27′40″N 0°08′15″W	1300154	St Mary's Redemptorist Monastery
Stockwell Bus Garage	Binfield Road, Stockwell	Bus Depot	1952–53	29 March 1988	TQ3035976686; 51°28′27″N 0°07′28″W	1249757	Stockwell Bus Garage More images
Stone Statue of Edward VI at St Thomas' Hospital	Lambeth (Outside main entrance (north entrance to North Block) to St Thomas' Hospital, off Westminster Bridge Road, Lambeth)	Statue	1682	30 May 1979	TQ3067279548; 51°29′59″N 0°07′08″W	1319933	Stone Statue of Edward VI at St Thomas' Hospital More images
The Academy (formerly Astoria Theatre)	Brixton	Cinema	1929	16 January 1974	TQ3104175755; 51°27′56″N 0°06′54″W	1064934	The Academy (formerly Astoria Theatre) More images
The Belgrave Hospital for Children	Clapham Road, Kennington Oval, SW9	Childrens Hospital	1903	27 March 1981	TQ3112277443; 51°28′51″N 0°06′47″W	1358241	The Belgrave Hospital for Children More images
Brixton Windmill	Brixton Hill	Windmill	1816	19 October 1951	TQ3045874362; 51°27′12″N 0°07′26″W	1080573	Brixton Windmill More images
The South Bank Lion at East End of Westminster Bridge	South Bank	Sculpture	1837	27 March 1981	TQ3059979676; 51°30′03″N 0°07′11″W	1068742	The South Bank Lion at East End of Westminster Bridge More images
Tomb of Admiral Bligh in St Mary's Churchyard	Garden Museum, Lambeth Road, Lambeth	Tomb	1817	27 March 1981	TQ3062779006; 51°29′42″N 0°07′11″W	1116226	Tomb of Admiral Bligh in St Mary's Churchyard More images
Tomb of John Tradescant and His Family in St Mary's Churchyard	Garden Museum, Lambeth Road, Lambeth	Tomb	1662	27 March 1981	TQ3062678998; 51°29′41″N 0°07′11″W	1116214	Tomb of John Tradescant and His Family in St Mary's Churchyard More images
Tomb of William Sealy in St Mary's Churchyard	Outside the Garden Museum, Lambeth Road, Lambeth	Tomb	1800	27 March 1981	TQ3057779000; 51°29′42″N 0°07′13″W	1080381	Tomb of William Sealy in St Mary's Churchyard More images
Vauxhall Bridge	Lambeth	Road Bridge with Sculpture	1904–06	26 November 2008	TQ3018578145; 51°29′14″N 0°07′35″W	1393012	Vauxhall Bridge More images
Villa on South West Corner of St Michaels Convent (formerly Known As Park Hill)	Streatham Common North, Streatham	Villa	c. 1835	27 March 1981	TQ3103471150; 51°25′27″N 0°07′00″W	1064936	Upload Photo
Waterloo Bridge	Lambeth	Road Bridge	1939–45	16 January 1981	TQ3079680504; 51°30′30″N 0°07′00″W	1081053	Waterloo Bridge More images
Waterworks Pumping Station	Conyers Road, Streatham	Water Pumping Station	Late 19th century	27 March 1981	TQ2955871000; 51°25′24″N 0°08′17″W	1358229	Waterworks Pumping Station More images
West Norwood Memorial Park Augustus Ralli Mortuary Chapel in the Greek Burial Ground	West Norwood	Mortuary Chapel	c. 1872	8 April 1974	TQ3240872248; 51°26′02″N 0°05′48″W	1064989	West Norwood Memorial Park Augustus Ralli Mortuary Chapel in the Greek Burial Ground More images
West Norwood Memorial Park Mausoleum of Sir Henry Tate	West Norwood	Mausoleum	c. 1890	27 March 1981	TQ3240772150; 51°25′58″N 0°05′48″W	1065025	West Norwood Memorial Park Mausoleum of Sir Henry Tate More images
West Norwood Memorial Park Mausoleum of JP Ralli West of Gate in the Greek Burial Ground	West Norwood	Mausoleum	c. 1863	27 March 1981	TQ3241472270; 51°26′02″N 0°05′47″W	1357927	West Norwood Memorial Park Mausoleum of JP Ralli West of Gate in the Greek Burial Ground More images
West Norwood Memorial Park Tomb of Alexander Berens	West Norwood	Chest Tomb	c. 1858	27 March 1981	TQ3232072051; 51°25′55″N 0°05′53″W	1065022	West Norwood Memorial Park Tomb of Alexander Berens More images
West Norwood Memorial Park Tomb of Doctor Gideon Mantell	West Norwood	Tomb	c. 1852	27 March 1981	TQ3219172082; 51°25′56″N 0°05′59″W	1106387	West Norwood Memorial Park Tomb of Doctor Gideon Mantell More images
West Norwood Memorial Park Tomb of John Britton	West Norwood	Tomb	c. 1857	27 March 1981	TQ3206872198; 51°26′00″N 0°06′05″W	1106239	West Norwood Memorial Park Tomb of John Britton More images
West Norwood Memorial Park Tomb of William and Elizabeth Burges	West Norwood	Chest Tomb	c. 1855	27 March 1981	TQ3242271997; 51°25′53″N 0°05′47″W	1064984	West Norwood Memorial Park Tomb of William and Elizabeth Burges More images
Westminster Bridge	Lambeth	Road Bridge	1862	5 February 1970	TQ3046879663; 51°30′03″N 0°07′18″W	1066172	Westminster Bridge More images
Westminster Bridge	Lambeth	Bridge	1862	5 February 1970	TQ3055079661; 51°30′03″N 0°07′14″W	1081058	Westminster Bridge More images
Woodstock Court	2 and 20 Newburn Street, Kennington	Two-storey almshouse-style quadrangle with central fountain	1914	27 March 1981	TQ3096978423; 51°29′23″N 0°06′54″W	1320423	Woodstock Court More images
39, 41 and 43 Old Town	Clapham, SW4	House	Early-mid 18th century	14 July 1955	TQ2924175545; 51°27′51″N 0°08′27″W	1065000	39, 41 and 43 Old Town More images
350 and 352 Kennington Road	Lambeth	Terrace	Early 19th century	19 October 1951	TQ3117878050; 51°29′10″N 0°06′44″W	1186098	350 and 352 Kennington Road More images
155 and 157 Kennington Lane SE11	Kennington, SE11	House	mid-18th century	19 October 1951	TQ3133478375; 51°29′21″N 0°06′35″W	1299526	155 and 157 Kennington Lane SE11 More images
Terrace, 12–21 Clapham Common Northside SW4	Clapham Common, SW4	Terrace	c. 1720	14 July 1955	TQ2900775360; 51°27′45″N 0°08′40″W	1080493	Terrace, 12–21 Clapham Common Northside SW4 More images
