= List of public art in the London Borough of Lambeth =

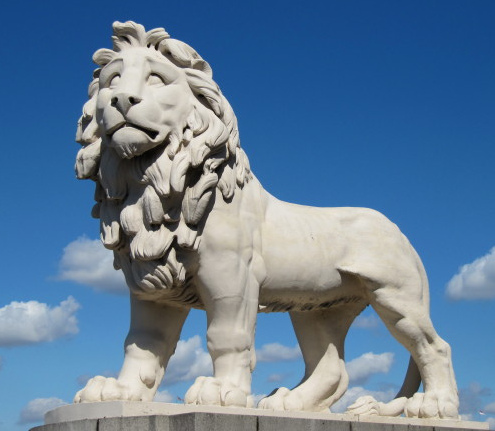
South Bank Lion

This is a list of public art in the London Borough of Lambeth.

== Brixton ==
Image	Title / subject	Location and coordinates	Date	Artist / designer	Type	Material	Designation	Notes
More images	Bust of Henry Tate	Brixton Library 51.4609°N 0.1154°W	1905	Thomas Brock	Bust	Bronze	Grade II	
	Justice, Science, Art and Literature	Lambeth Town Hall clock tower	c. 1905–1908			Portland stone	Grade II	
	Youth	Lambeth Town Hall	c. 1935–1938	Denis Dunlop	Relief	Portland stone	Grade II	
More images	Ton of bricks tile motif (Bricks ton pun!)	Brixton tube station, Victoria line platforms	c. 1971	Hans Ernest Unger			—N/a	
More images	Platforms Piece Joy Battick, Karin Heistermann and Peter Lloyd	Brixton railway station	1986	Kevin Atherton	Statues	Bronze	Grade II	
	Sharpeville Massacre Memorial	Windrush Square	1987	?	Memorial	Stone and metal	—N/a	
More images	The Brixton Heron	Roof of the Prince of Wales pub, corner of Brixton Road and Coldharbour Lane 51.4615593°N 0.1152009°W	2010	Maggi Hambling	Sculptural weather vane	Metal	—N/a	Depicts a grey heron with a fish in its bill.
More images	The Foxes and Cherries	Electric Avenue	2010	Lucy Casson	Architectural sculpture	Fibreglass and recycled materials	—N/a	
	Brixton Speaks	Electric Avenue	2011	Will Self, Jack Self			—N/a	
	David Bowie mural	Morley's department store, Tunstall Road	2013	James Cochran	Mural		—N/a	
	Twins	Somerleyton Road, Coldharbour Lane	2016	Taslim Martin		Cast iron and stainless steel	—N/a	
More images	African and Caribbean War Memorial	Windrush Square 51.4605°N 0.1148°W	2017		Obelisk		—N/a	Unveiled 22 June 2017. The design was announced to the public in 2014.
	Statue of Claudia Jones	Black Cultural Archives, Windrush Square	c. 2021	Favour Jonathan	Statue		—N/a	
More images	Cherry Groce Memorial Pavilion Cherry Groce	Windrush Square	2021	Adjaye Associates			—N/a	
	Platforms Piece: The Return, or Joy II Joy Battick	Brixton railway station	2023	Kevin Atherton	Statue	Bronze	—N/a	A statue of one of the subjects of Atherton's earlier work at the station aged 62, facing her 26-year-old self across the platforms.
	Brixton murals	Various locations in and around Brixton town centre					—N/a	

== Clapham ==
Image	Title / subject	Location and coordinates	Date	Artist / designer	Type	Material	Designation	Notes
More images	Drinking fountain	Clapham Common, between Long Road and The Pavement 51.4618°N 0.1406°W	1884	August von Kreling	Fountain with sculptural group	Bronze with granite plinth	Grade II	
More images	Clapham Common War Memorial	Holy Trinity Church, Clapham Common 51.4624°N 0.1426°W	after 1918	?	Celtic cross	Granite	Grade II	
	War memorial	St Mary's Roman Catholic Church 51.4615°N 0.1372°W	1919–1920	Giles Gilbert Scott	War memorial	Limestone	Grade II	
	Clapham Park War Memorial	Church of the Holy Spirit, Narbonne Avenue 51.4547°N 0.1403°W	1921	?	Calvary cross	Stone	Grade II	Unveiled 14 November 1921.

== Kennington ==
Image	Title / subject	Location and coordinates	Date	Artist / designer	Type	Material	Designation	Notes
More images	Decorative column	Kennington Park 51.4835°N 0.1101°W	c. 1869	George Tinworth	Column	Terracotta	Grade II	
More images	War memorial	St Mark's Church 51.4816°N 0.1124°W	1921	?	Memorial cross	Granite	Grade II	Unveiled 29 October 1921.
More images	Kennington War Memorial	Kennington Park 51.4854°N 0.1083°W	1924	Thomas Arthur Lodge	Cenotaph	Stone	Grade II	Unveiled 19 July 1924.
	Memorial to Len Hutton	Hobbs Gate, The Oval	1989–1993	Walter Ritchie	Relief sculpture	Brick	—N/a	The cricketer is portrayed scoring his record-breaking innings of 364 runs against Australia in 1938. This work is said to be Ritchie's masterpiece.
More images	Memorial to Victims of the Kennington Park Air Raid Shelter Tragedy	Kennington Park 51.4837°N 0.1103°W	2006	Richard Kindersley	Memorial	Caithness stone	—N/a	Unveiled 14 October 2006. Inscribed with a quotation from Maya Angelou's poem "On the Pulse of Morning" (1993): history/ despite its/ wrenching/ pain/ cannot/ be unlived/ but/ if faced/ with/ courage/ need not/ be lived/ again.
More images	Touchstone	Oval Triangle	2018	Peter Randall-Page	Sculpture	Granite	—N/a	

== Lambeth ==
Image	Title / subject	Location and coordinates	Date	Artist / designer	Type	Material	Designation	Notes
More images	Statue of Edward VI	Outside main entrance, St Thomas' Hospital 51.4998°N 0.1188°W	1682	Thomas Cartwright after Nathaniel Hanwell	Statue	Stone	Grade II*	
More images	Statue of Robert Clayton	A garden outside St Thomas' Hospital 51.5004°N 0.1195°W	1702	Grinling Gibbons	Statue	Marble	Grade I	
More images	Statue of Edward VI	St Thomas' Hospital 51.4992°N 0.1195°W	1736	Peter Scheemakers	Statue	Bronze	Grade II*	
	Mr Doulton in His Studio Henry Doulton	Southbank House, 81 Black Prince Road	c. 1878	George Tinworth	Tympanum relief	Terracotta	Grade II	
More images	Revolving Torsion	A garden outside St Thomas' Hospital	1972–1973	Naum Gabo	Sculpture with fountain	Stainless steel	Grade II*	
More images	South of the River	Outside Becket House, Lambeth Palace Road	1975–1976	Bernard Schottlander	Sculpture	Stainless steel	Grade II	
	Herald Sundial	Heralds Place	1984	Nathan David	Relief with sundial	Stone and bronze	—N/a	
More images	Cross the Divide	Outside St Thomas' Hospital	2000	Rick Kirby	Sculptural group	Stainless steel	—N/a	
More images	International Memorial to Seafarers	International Maritime Organization, Albert Embankment	2001	Michael Sandle	Sculpture	Bronze	—N/a	Unveiled 27 September (World Maritime Day) 2001.
	Children of the World	Outside Evelina London Children's Hospital, St Thomas' Hospital	2006	Frederic Lanovsky	Sculpture		—N/a	Unveiled 15 June 2006 by Princess Anne.
More images	Special Operations Executive Memorial Violette Szabo	Lambeth Palace Road, opposite entrance to Lambeth Palace	2009	Karen Newman	Bust		—N/a	Unveiled 4 October 2009 by the Duke of Wellington.
More images	Statue of Mary Seacole	Outside St Thomas' Hospital	2009	Martin Jennings	Statue	Bronze	—N/a	Unveiled 30 June 2016 by Floella Benjamin.

== South Bank ==
Image	Title / subject	Location and coordinates	Date	Artist / designer	Type	Material	Designation	Notes
More images	South Bank Lion	Outside County Hall 51.5009°N 0.1198°W	1837 (restored 1951)	William F. Woodington	Statue	Coade stone	Grade II*	
	The Motorcyclist	Shell Centre	1957	Siegfried Charoux	Statue	Cemented iron	—N/a	
	The Shell Fountain	Courtyard of the Shell Centre 51.5041°N 0.1163°W	1959–1963	Franta Belsky	Fountain with sculpture	Bronze	Grade II	
More images	Zemran	First floor terrace, Royal Festival Hall	1971	William Pye	Sculpture	Stainless steel	Grade II	
More images	Statue of Fryderyk Chopin	Royal Festival Hall	1975	Bronisław Kubica	Statue	Bronze	—N/a	
	Jubilee Oracle	Next to Jubilee Gardens	1980	"Alexander"	Sculpture	Bronze	—N/a	
	Passage Paving	Outside Royal Festival Hall	1983	Richard Harris	Sculpture	Concrete	—N/a	
	Pend	Outside the Queen Elizabeth Hall	1983–1984	Anne Nicholson	Sculpture	Portland stone	—N/a	
	Arena	Walkway near the Royal National Theatre	1983–1988	John Maine	Sculpture	Stone	—N/a	
More images	International Brigades Memorial	Outside County Hall	1985	Ian Walters	Sculptural group	Bronze	—N/a	
More images	London Pride	Outside the National Theatre 51.507617°N 0.114764°W	1987 cast of a work of 1951	Frank Dobson	Sculptural group	Bronze	Grade II	
More images	Bust of Nelson Mandela	Outside the Royal Festival Hall	1988 replica of an original of 1982	Ian Walters	Bust	Bronze	—N/a	
More images	Statue of Laurence Olivier	Outside the National Theatre	2007	Angela Conner	Statue	Bronze	—N/a	Unveiled 22 May 2007, the centenary of Olivier's birth.

== Stockwell ==
Image	Title / subject	Location and coordinates	Date	Artist / designer	Type	Material	Designation	Notes
More images	Stockwell War Memorial	Stockwell Road 51.4730°N 0.1220°W	1920	Frank T. Dear	War memorial	Portland stone	Grade II	
More images	Swan tile motif	Stockwell tube station, Victoria line platforms	c. 1971	Abram Games	Tile motif		—N/a	
	Tradescant Family Memorial John Tradescant the Elder John Tradescant the Younger	St Stephen's Terrace	1988	Hilary Cartmel	Sculpture		—N/a	
	Stockwell Memorial Mural	Stockwell Memorial Gardens	2001	Brian Barnes and Myra Harris	Mural	Household paint	—N/a	
More images	Bronze Woman	Stockwell Memorial Gardens	2008	Aleix Barbat, after Ian Walters	Statue	Bronze	—N/a	
	Memorial to Jean Charles de Menezes	Outside Stockwell tube station	7 January 2010	Mary Edwards	Mosaic		—N/a	

== Streatham ==
Image	Title / subject	Location and coordinates	Date	Artist / designer	Type	Material	Designation	Notes
More images	Dyce Drinking Fountain	Streatham Green 51.4283°N 0.1315°W	1862	William Dyce	Drinking fountain	Portland stone, red sandstone and marble	Grade II	
More images	Streatham War Memorial	Memorial Gardens, Streatham Common North 51.4233°N 0.1294°W	1921	Albert Toft	Statue	Bronze	Grade II	Unveiled 14 October 1922.
	War memorial	St Peter's Church, Leigham Court Road 51.4319°N 0.1153°W	1922	?	Calvary cross	Bronze, wood and stone	Grade II	Unveiled 15 January 2022.
	Streatham Civilians War Memorial	Memorial Gardens, Streatham Common North 51.4231°N 0.1316°W	2006	Ekkehard Altenburger	War memorial pillar	Kilkenny limestone	—N/a	Unveiled 21 October 2006. Inscribed GRIEF HAS NO BOUNDARIES, a quotation from a poem by Rohit Sapra.
	Charioteer with 4 horses	Caesar's Night Club, Streatham Hill					—N/a	Removed in 2010 on closure of the nightclub. Current location unknown. Building demolished 2015.

== Vauxhall ==
Image	Title / subject	Location and coordinates	Date	Artist / designer	Type	Material	Designation	Notes
	Agriculture, Engineering and Pottery	Vauxhall Bridge	1907	F. W. Pomeroy	Statues			
More images	Following the Leader Memorial to the Children Killed in the Blitz	Darley House, Vauxhall Gardens Estate, Laud Street 51.488036°N 0.120039°W	1949	Peter Laszlo Peri	Relief	Coloured concrete	Grade II	
More images	Boys Playing Football	Wareham House, South Lambeth Estate, Fentiman Road 51.480521°N 0.118925°W	1951–1952	Peter Laszlo Peri	Relief	Coloured concrete	Grade II	
More images	Mother and Children Playing	Horton House, South Lambeth Estate 51.480854°N 0.119853°W	1951–1952	Peter Laszlo Peri	Relief	Coloured concrete	Grade II	
More images	Vauxhall Gardens tile motif	Vauxhall tube station, Victoria line platforms	c. 1971	George Smith	Murals	Tiles	—N/a	
More images	Bust of Basaveshwara	Albert Embankment, opposite the junction with Tinworth Street	2015	Sridhar Murthy	Bust	Bronze	—N/a	Unveiled 14 November 2015 by Narendra Modi, the Prime Minister of India.
	Underline	Vauxhall tube station	c. 2015–2019	Giles Round, Design Work Leisure	Murals	Tiles	—N/a	
	Pipe Up	Albert Embankment	2016	ADS6	Seating sculpture	Ceramic	—N/a	
	Self and Other (for the Albert Embankment)	30 Albert Embankment	2018	Random International	Installation	Glass and LEDs	—N/a	Unveiled 7 July 2018.

== Waterloo ==
Image	Title / subject	Location and coordinates	Date	Artist / designer	Type	Material	Designation	Notes
More images	War memorial	St John's Church 51.5045°N 0.1124°W	1919	?	Crucifix	Bronze and wood	Grade II	
More images	Victory Arch London and South Western Railway War Memorial	Entrance arch of Waterloo station 51.503752°N 0.113879°W	1919–1922	Charles Whiffen	War memorial	Portland stone	Grade II	Opened 21 March 1922.
More images	The Sunbathers	Waterloo station 51.503°N 0.112°W	1951	Peter Laszlo Peri	Sculpture	"Pericrete" concrete		Originally created in 1951 for the Festival of Britain, the sculpture was believed lost after the festival. It was rediscovered in 2016, was restored, and has been displayed at Waterloo station since 2020.
	Memorial to Eva Hubback	Morley College	1963	David Rowles-Chapman	Relief	Stone	—N/a	
More images	Blake's Lambeth	Tunnels alongside Archbishop's Park, near Waterloo station	2005–2015	Southbank Mosaics after William Blake	Mosaics	Mosaic	—N/a	70 mosaics based on the work of Blake, who lived for ten of his most productive years in Lambeth, at 13 Hercules Buildings.
	Mosaic portraits Emma Cons, Violette Szabo, Jude Kelly, Octavia Hill, Lilian Baylis, Mary Seacole, Eva Hubback, Natalie Bell, Margaret Mellor, Heather Rabbatts, Mrs Mallet, Annie McCall, Caroline Martineau, Hester Thrale	Morley College	2012	Southbank Mosaics	Mosaics	Mosaic	—N/a	Unveiled 3 July 2012.
More images	Battle of Waterloo Memorial	Waterloo station 51.5033°N 0.1117°W	2015	Jason Brooks	War memorial		—N/a	Unveiled 10 June 2015 by the Duke of Wellington. The bronze plaque is based on the reverse of the Waterloo Medal.
More images	National Windrush Monument	Waterloo station	2022	Basil Watson	Sculptural group	Bronze	—N/a	Unveiled 22 June 2022 (Windrush Day) by the Duke and Duchess of Cambridge. Figures of a man, a woman and a child in their Sunday best stand atop a pile of bulging suitcases.

== West Norwood ==
Image	Title / subject	Location and coordinates	Date	Artist / designer	Type	Material	Designation	Notes
	West Norwood War Memorial	St Luke's Church, Knight's Hill 51.4326°N 0.1034°W	after 1918	?	Memorial cross	Stone	Grade II	

== See also ==
- National Covid Memorial Wall
- Skylon (Festival of Britain)

== Bibliography ==
- Matthews, Peter (2018). London's Statues and Monuments. Oxford: Shire Publications.
