= Herbert House =

Herbert House may refer to:

== Buildings ==
- Alois Herbert Double House, Saint Joseph, Missouri, listed on the NRHP in Buchanan County, Missouri
- Thomas Galbraith Herbert House, Leesville, South Carolina, listed on the National Register of Historic Places in Lexington County, South Carolina
- John Herbert House, Franklin, Tennessee, listed on the NRHP in Williamson County, Tennessee
- Herbert House (Hampton, Virginia), listed on the National Register of Historic Places in Hampton, Virginia
- Herbert House, Kennington, house in Kennington, London
- Sir Thomas Herbert's House, in York, England

== People ==
- Herbert O. House (1929–2013), American organic chemist
