= Francis Edwards (architect) =

British architect

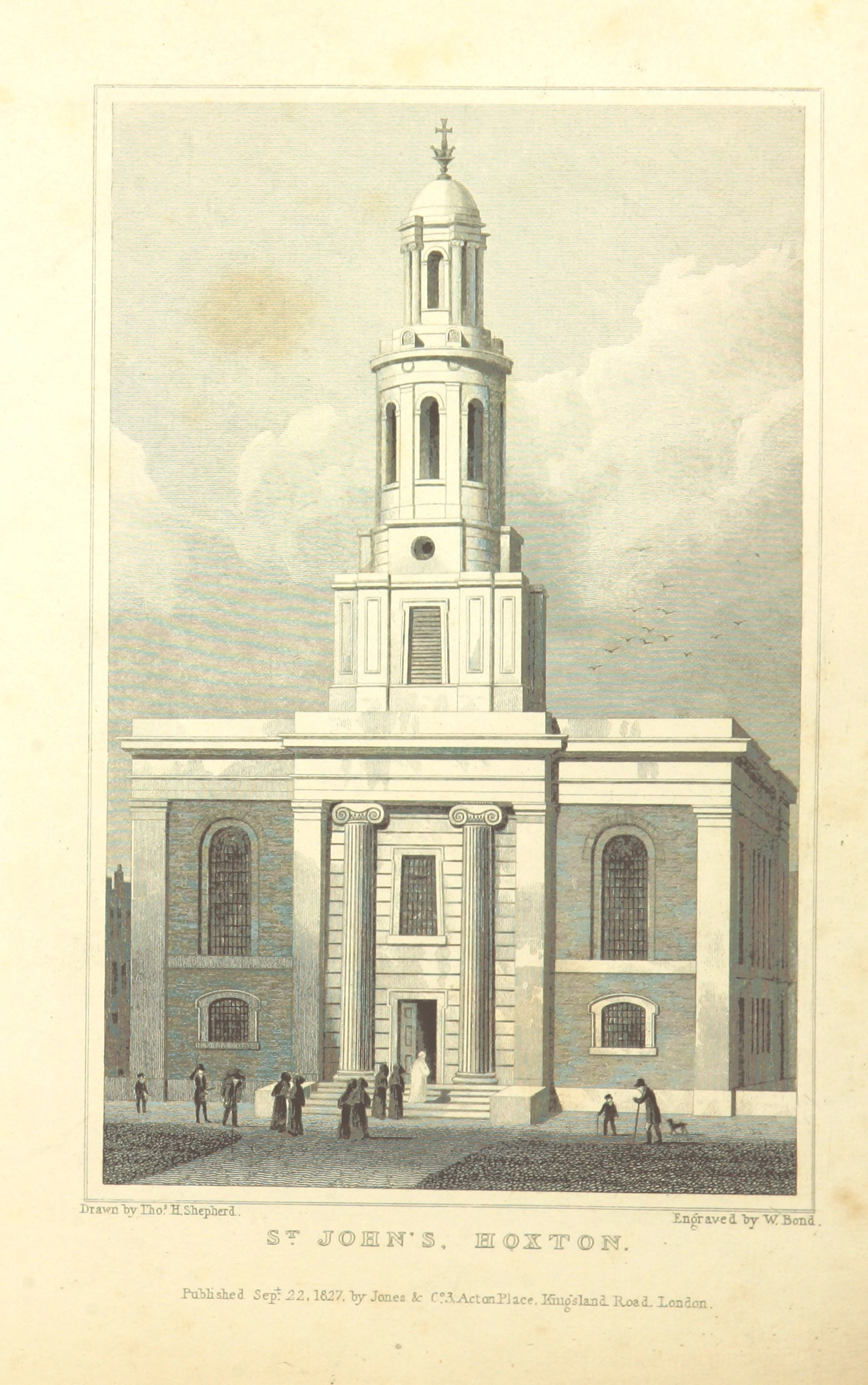
St John's Hoxton in 1828

Francis Edwards (1784–1857) was a British architect of the Georgian and early Victorian periods, who worked extensively in the London area.

Sir John Soane's foremost pupil, Edwards joined Soane's office at Lincoln's Inn Fields as an improver in 1806 and was admitted to the Royal Academy Schools two years later.

His work, mostly neo-classical in style, is best known now for town planning and landscaping, but Edwards also oversaw construction of his celebrated and much copied design of St John's Church at Hoxton, and the Lion Brewery at Lambeth (demolished in 1949).

He was architect to the Imperial Gas Light and Coke Company as well as to the Goding brewing family, becoming an Associate of the Institute of British Architects in London before establishing his own practice, Francis Edwards & Co.

In later years he lived at Bloomsbury Square in the parish of St Giles, London. He died in London.

== See also ==
- Neoclassical architecture
- Sir John Soane
