= St John the Baptist, Hoxton =

Coordinates: 51°31′50″N 0°5′0″W

St John's Hoxton
- St John the Baptist with Christ Church, Hoxton
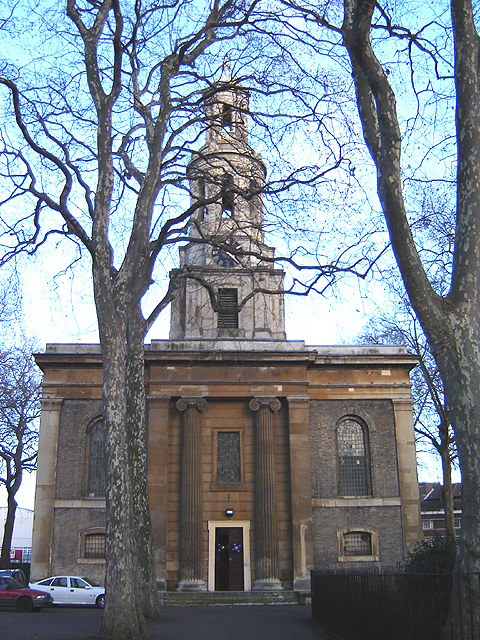
- West door of St John's Hoxton
- St John's Hoxton
- Location: Hoxton, London Borough of Hackney
- Country: England
- Denomination: Church of England
- Churchmanship: Evangelical Protestant
- Website: stjohnshoxton.org.uk

History
- Founded: 1826
- Founder: Worshipful Company of Haberdashers
- Dedication: St John the Baptist
- Dedicated: 22 June 1826

Architecture
- Architect: Francis Edwards
- Style: Neo-classical
- Years built: 1822–26

Administration
- Province: Canterbury
- Diocese: London
- Archdeaconry: Hackney
- Parish: St John the Baptist with Christ Church, Hoxton

Clergy
- Bishop(s): Rt Revd and Rt Hon. Dame Sarah Mullally (Bishop of London); Rt Revd Dr Joanne Grenfell (Suffragan Bishop of Stepney)
- Vicar: Revd Graham Hunter

Arms of King William IV

The Church of St John the Baptist, Hoxton usually known as St John's Hoxton, is an Anglican parish church in the Hoxton area of the London Borough of Hackney.

Situated one mile north of the City of London on New North Road, nearby St John's Hoxton is Silicon Roundabout and also Aske Gardens, named after the parish's major benefactor, City haberdasher Alderman Robert Aske.

In 1826, population growth in London's East End led to St John's being established as a chapel of ease, within the ancient parish of Shoreditch. In 1830 it became the parish church of its own newly created ecclesiastical parish within the diocese of London, though for civil purposes it remained part of Shoreditch, Middlesex.

In 1953 the benefice of St John's Hoxton was reunited with Christ Church, created in 1841 from the north part of the parish.

== History ==
Dedicated to St John the Baptist, its name preserves the memory of Holywell Priory which was dissolved in 1539 by King Henry VIII.

In Victorian London the parish's charitable giving was recognised by social campaigners, such as the philanthropist Charles Booth, for its welfare work in a deteriorating inner-city environment. Many members of the church became missionaries in Africa and Asia, among them the first Bishop of Chota Nagpur, Jabez Cornelius Whitley, whose father, chaplain to the Haberdashers' Aske's Hospital School formerly located in Pitfield Street was the Revd Edward Whiteley (1798–1861). Whiteley was appointed the parish's first vicar by the Worshipful Company of Haberdashers as patrons of the living and helped found what became London's largest savings bank (National Savings Bank) to give opportunities to the "local poor", as well as St John's National Schools which still thrive in India.

The maternal great-great-great-grandfather of Catherine, Princess of Wales, John Goldsmith (1827–1888) was married to Esther Jones at St John's Hoxton in 1850.

=== Present day ===
The present vicar, the Revd Graham Hunter, serves as a court member of the Haberdashers' Company and assists Dame Sarah Mullally, Bishop of London.

The church is part of the HTB (Holy Trinity Brompton) Network and a member of the Evangelical Alliance.

St John's Hoxton featured on the BBC programme Songs of Praise in 2025.

== Architecture ==
Completed in 1826, St John's is a Regency church in the classical style, and the only one built to the design of the celebrated architect, Francis Edwards, Sir John Soane's foremost pupil.

A large example of a Commissioners' church, its original floor plan remains intact as well as its galleries and décor, including a painted ceiling executed in the early 20th century by the ecclesiastical architect Joseph Arthur Reeve. St John's Hoxton is a grade II* listed building.

=== Pipe organ ===
Built and installed in 1915 by the firm of Thomas Sidwell Jones, the pipe organ sits in the choir gallery retaining its original late-Georgian wooden case with an elaborate façade displaying the arms of William IV.

Last restored in 1934 by Henry Speechly & Son, St John's organ is known to voice the following stops:

Choir
Gamba	8'
Dulciana	8'
Lieblich Gedackt	8'
Viol d'Orchestre	8'
Flute	4'
Piccolo	2'
Clarinet	8'

Great
Bourdon	16'
Open Diapason No. 1	8'
Open Diapason No. 2	8'
Clarabella	8'
Dulciana	8'
Principal	4'
Harmonic Flute	4'
Twelfth	2.2/3'
Fifteenth	2'
Mixture	3'
Trumpet	8'

Swell
Double Diapason	16'
Open Diapason	8'
Lieblich Gedackt	8'
Salicional	8'
Voix Celeste	8'
Principal	4'
Mixture	3'
Cornopean	8'
Oboe	8'

Pedal
Open Diapason	16'
Bourdon	16'
Bass Flute	8'

=== Bells ===
In St John's church tower hangs a ring of ten bells, cast at the nearby Whitechapel Bell Foundry.

Coat of arms of St John the Baptist, Hoxton
Notes Arms and Crest of the Worshipful Company of Haberdashers confirmed by Robert Cooke, Clarenceux King of Arms, 8 November 1570 Adopted 1446 Crest On a wreath Argent and Azure issuing from Clouds two naked Arms embowed holding a Laurel wreath all Proper Escutcheon Barry wavy of six Argent and Azure on a Bend Gules a Lion passant guardant Or Supporters On either side a Goat of India Argent flecked Gules membered Or Motto "Serve and Obey" Symbolism Arms of the Haberdashers' Company, patron of the advowson of St John the Baptist with Christ Church, Hoxton:

== See also ==
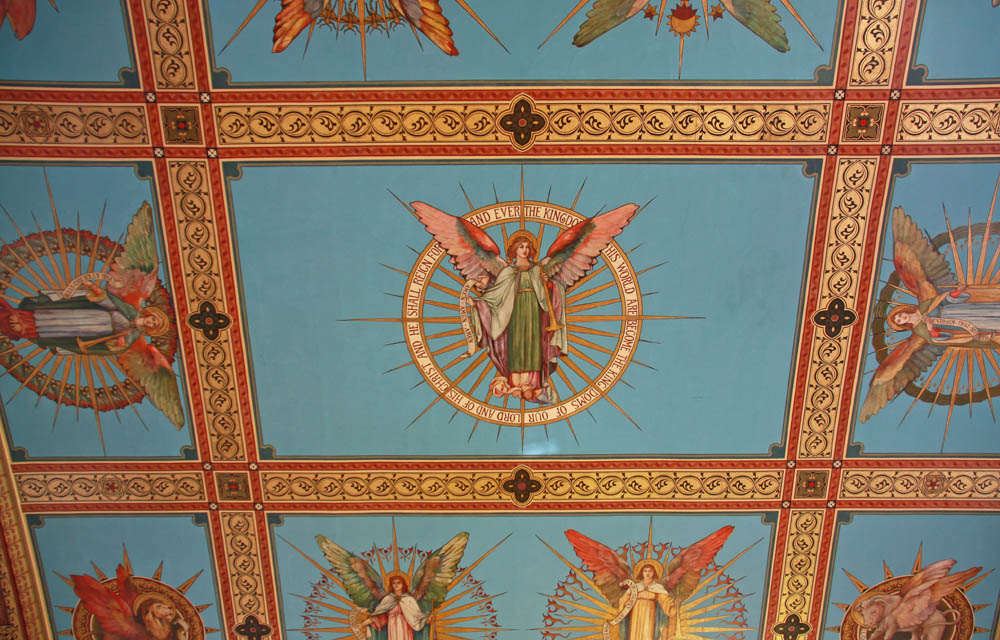
St John's Church ceiling

- Geffrye Museum
- List of churches in the Diocese of London
- St Monica's Priory Church, Hoxton (RC)
