= William F. Woodington =

English painter and sculptor

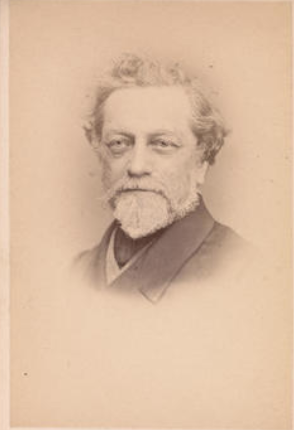
William F. Woodington (1806 – 1893)

William Frederick Woodington ARA (10 February 1806 – 24 December 1893) was an English painter and sculptor.

== Life ==
Woodington was born in Sutton Coldfield, Warwickshire (possibly at the Three Tuns in High Street), and was articled at the age of 12 to an engraver Robert William Sievier (1794–1865). When Sievier turned his hand to sculpture four years later, Woodington followed suit.

He exhibited at the Royal Academy from 1825, was appointed curator of the Academy's School of Sculpture in 1851, and was elected an Associate in 1876.

Woodington died at Brixton Hill aged 87 in 1893 and was buried at West Norwood.

His son, also called William Frederick Woodington, (1830–1922) was similarly a sculptor. They worked together on the bronze panel of Battle of the Nile and plinth of Nelson's Column. William Jr. also worked on statues for St Basil, St Gregory, St Chrysostom and St Anthanasias in the dome of St Paul's Cathedral and the memorial to Lord Napier of Magdala in the crypt.

== Notable works ==
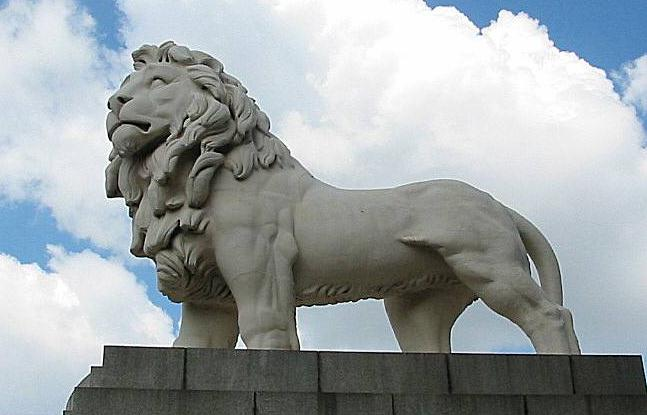
The South Bank Lion beside Westminster Bridge, Grade II* listed by English Heritage

- The 'Coade Stone Lions' (1837) – these originally adorned the Lion Brewery on London's South Bank, but when the brewery was demolished, the two lions were relocated: one stands near the Rowland Hill Memorial Gate at Twickenham Stadium; the other – the South Bank Lion – is situated on a plinth at the southern approach to Westminster Bridge, having previously been situated outside Waterloo station.
- A bronze plaque on the pedestal of Nelson's Column in Trafalgar Square depicting Nelson's loss of an eye at the Battle of the Nile (1838). Woodington also completed the St Vincent panel of Musgrave Watson who died in 1847, leaving a small model from which to work.
- An oil painting: The Descent into Hades (1854)
- A bust of Joseph Paxton (1869, unveiled 10 June 1873) which stands at the Crystal Palace National Sports Centre, south London.
- Statues of Plato, Archimedes and Justinian at 6 Burlington Gardens, London (c. 1870)
- A bust of Henry Fielding at Eton
- Memorial at church of St Mary Magdalene, Thornham Magna, Suffolk
- Marble bas-reliefs decorating the chapel in St Paul's Cathedral
- Statues for the House of Lords
- Six statues in the Royal Exchange Building in Liverpool
