= South Bank Lion =

Sculpture in London

- Red Lion
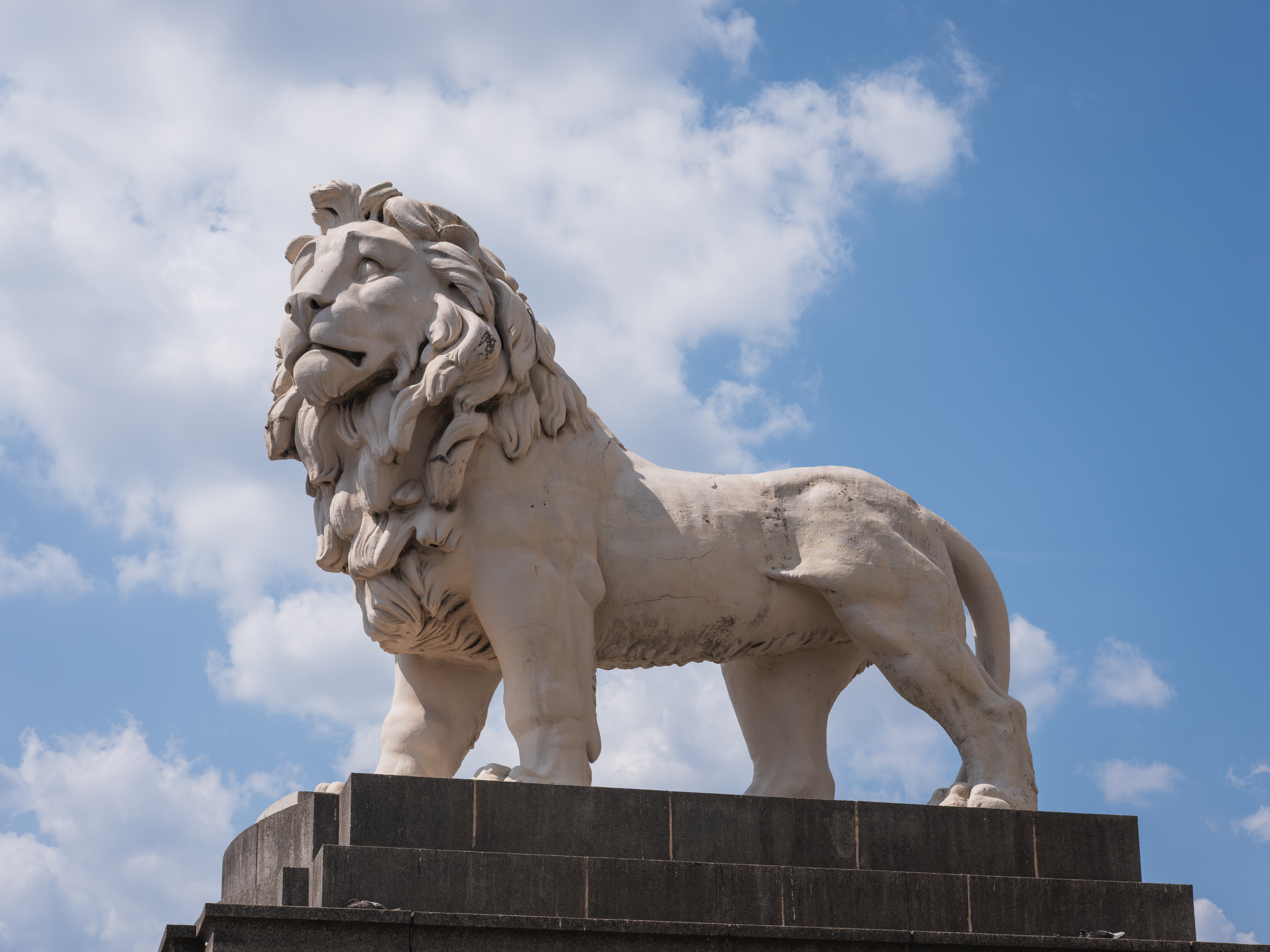
- The South Bank Lion

- Location within Greater London
- Artist: William Frederick Woodington
- Year: 1837
- Medium: Coade stone
- Subject: Lion
- Dimensions: 3.7 m × 4.0 m (12 ft × 13 ft)
- Weight: 13 tonnes
- Designation: Grade II* listed
- Location: London; 51.50088°N 0.1198°W

The South Bank Lion is an 1837 sculpture in Central London. Since 1966 it has stood next to County Hall, on the South Bank of the River Thames. It is a significant depiction of a lion, along with the four that surround Nelson's Column in Trafalgar Square just across the river.

The statue is about 13 feet (4.0 m) long and 12 feet (3.7 m) high, and weighs about 13 tonnes (14 tons). It was cast in 1837, the year of Queen Victoria's accession, of Coade stone, one of the earliest types of artificial stone. The material is very resistant to weathering, and the fine details of the lion's modelling still remain clear after decades of exposure to the corrosive effects of London's severe air pollution, the infamous pea soup fog, prior to the passage of the Clean Air Act 1956. The statue was made in separate parts and cramped together on an iron frame. It was formerly known as the Red Lion, as it was painted that colour between 1951 and 1966.

== History ==
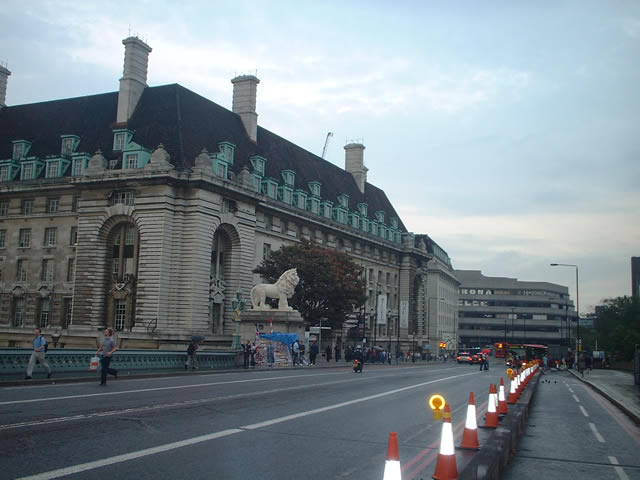
A view of the statue along Westminster Bridge

The lion was originally mounted on the parapet of James Goding's Lion Brewery on the Lambeth bank of the River Thames; Hungerford Bridge spanned the Thames nearby from 1845. The Lion Brewery closed in 1924 and the building was demolished in 1949, to make way for construction of the Royal Festival Hall as part of the Festival of Britain. The lion was removed, revealing the initials of the sculptor William Frederick Woodington and the date, 24 May 1837, under one of its paws. It was painted red as the symbol of British Rail, and mounted on high plinth beside the entrance to the Festival of Britain near Waterloo station.

The statue was moved in 1966 to allow the station to be extended. The red paint was removed, and the statue was erected in its current location on a large granite plinth at the east end of Westminster Bridge, to the north side, beside County Hall. The plinth bears the inscription "The South Bank Lion". The statue was given a Grade II* listing by English Heritage in 1981.

== Other versions ==
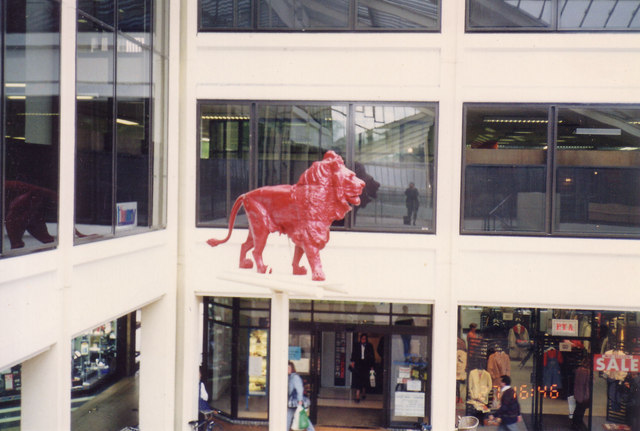
The long-lost red lion, formerly in the Lion Yard shopping centre in Cambridge

The prototype for the Lion Brewery statue was made in wood, and was rediscovered in Woburn, Bedfordshire in the 1970s. It was moved to Cambridge, where it was displayed at the new Lion Yard shopping centre, which had been named after a pub at that location. From 1999 the statue was kept in storage until late 2014, when it was moved to Cambridge University Rugby Club's ground on Grange Road, Cambridge.

A second, similar Coade stone lion was removed from the Lion Brewery when it was demolished. It stood on an arched gateway leading to a second brewery site on the south side of Belvedere Road, on the corner of Sutton Walk. It was presented to the Rugby Football Union in 1971, its centenary season, by the Greater London Council and unveiled in 1972. It is now located above the central pillar of the Rowland Hill Memorial Gate (Gate 3) to the west of Twickenham Stadium. It was covered in gold leaf when England hosted the 1991 Rugby World Cup.

The Lion Brewery also had a third Coade stone lion, over the arched entrance to the south of the main brewery site, on the north side of the Belvedere Road. It was present in 1930, but was missing for some years before the brewery was demolished, and is believed to have been destroyed.

A recumbent Coade stone lion, made in 1821 to a different design by Thomas Hardwick for King George IV, is mounted above the Lion Gate at Kew Gardens. It is partnered by a unicorn of the same material, which surmounts the corresponding gate. The Lion and the Unicorn are traditional symbols of England and Scotland respectively.

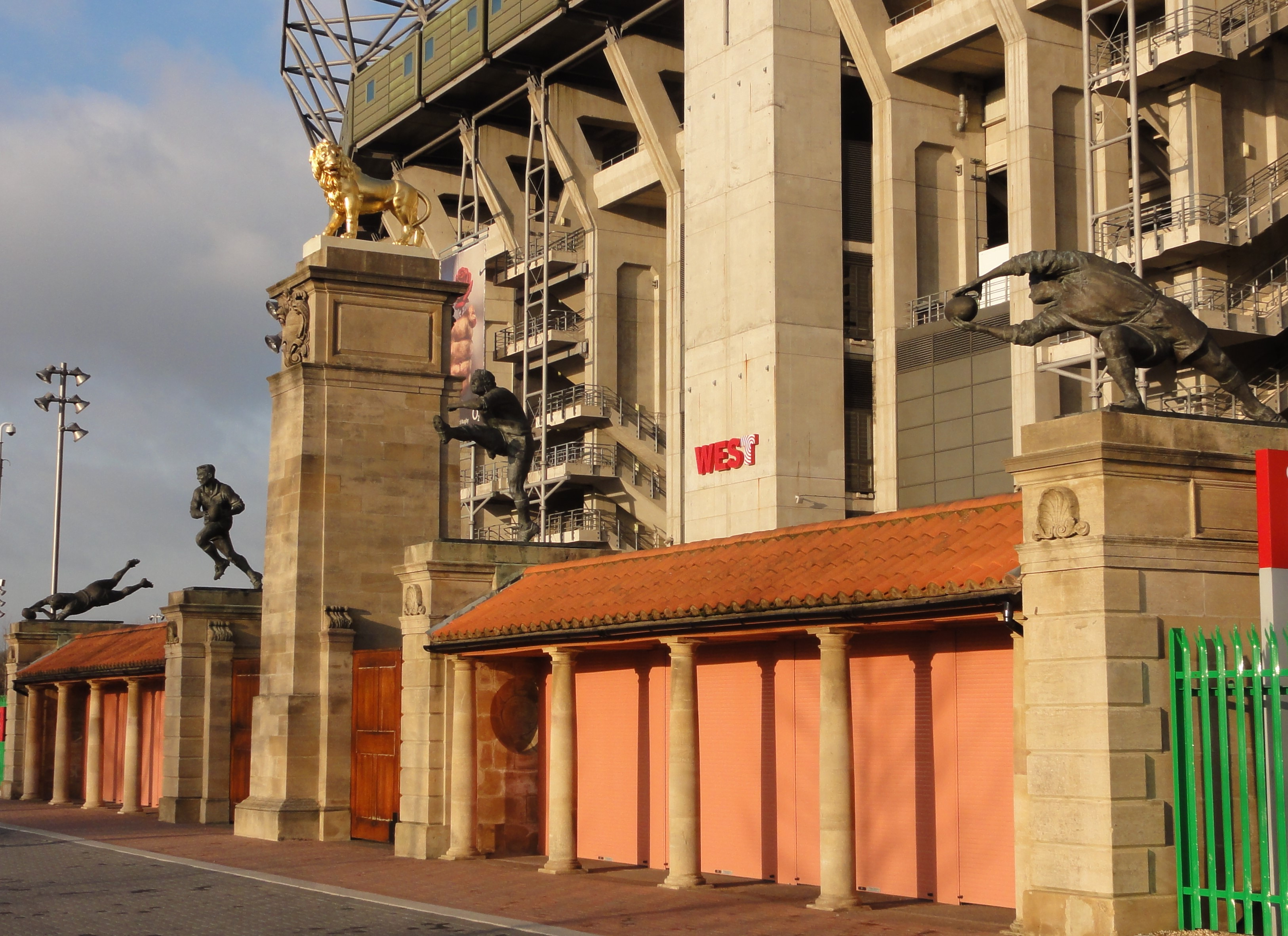
Gold lion and other statues at Twickenham Stadium

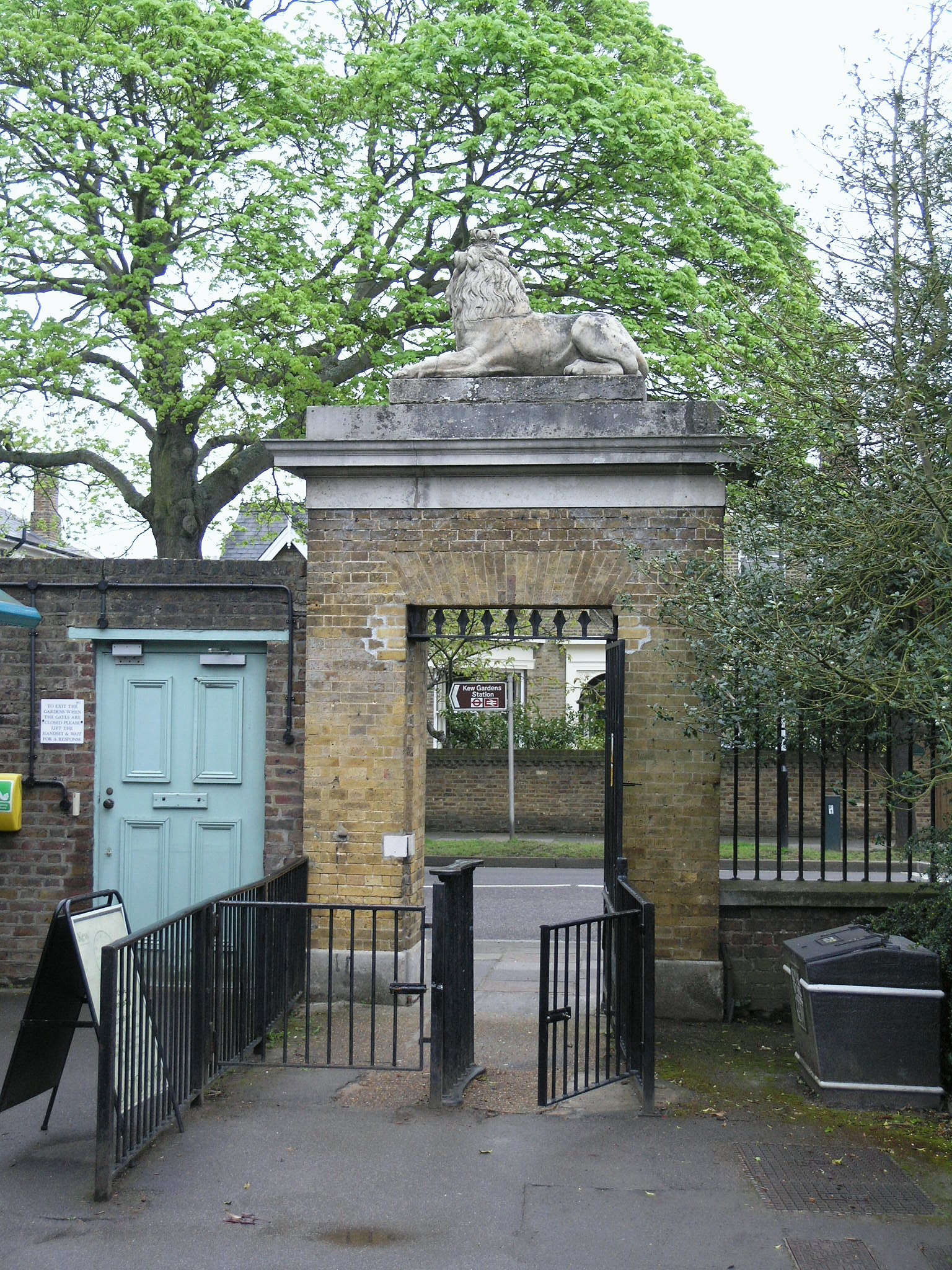
The Lion Gate at Kew Gardens

== See also ==
- List of public art in Lambeth
