= Lion Brewery Co =

Coordinates: 51.5062°N 0.1176°W

Lion Brewery Co
| Industry | Alcoholic beverage |
| Founded | 1836; re-established 2017 |
| Founders | James Goding (original brewery) |
| Headquarters | Singapore |
| Products | Beer |
| Website | https://lionbreweryco.com/ |

Lion Brewery Co is a British heritage brewery that was founded in 1836 in Lambeth, London.

For over a hundred years, the brewery shipped its heavily-hopped ales to trading posts and ports across the seas. It was one of the main exporters of beer to various parts of the British Empire, until the brewery was damaged by fire and closed in 1931. The building remained derelict until it was eventually demolished in 1949 to make way for the Royal Festival Hall.

In 2018, a new Lion Brewery Co was founded in Singapore.

== History ==
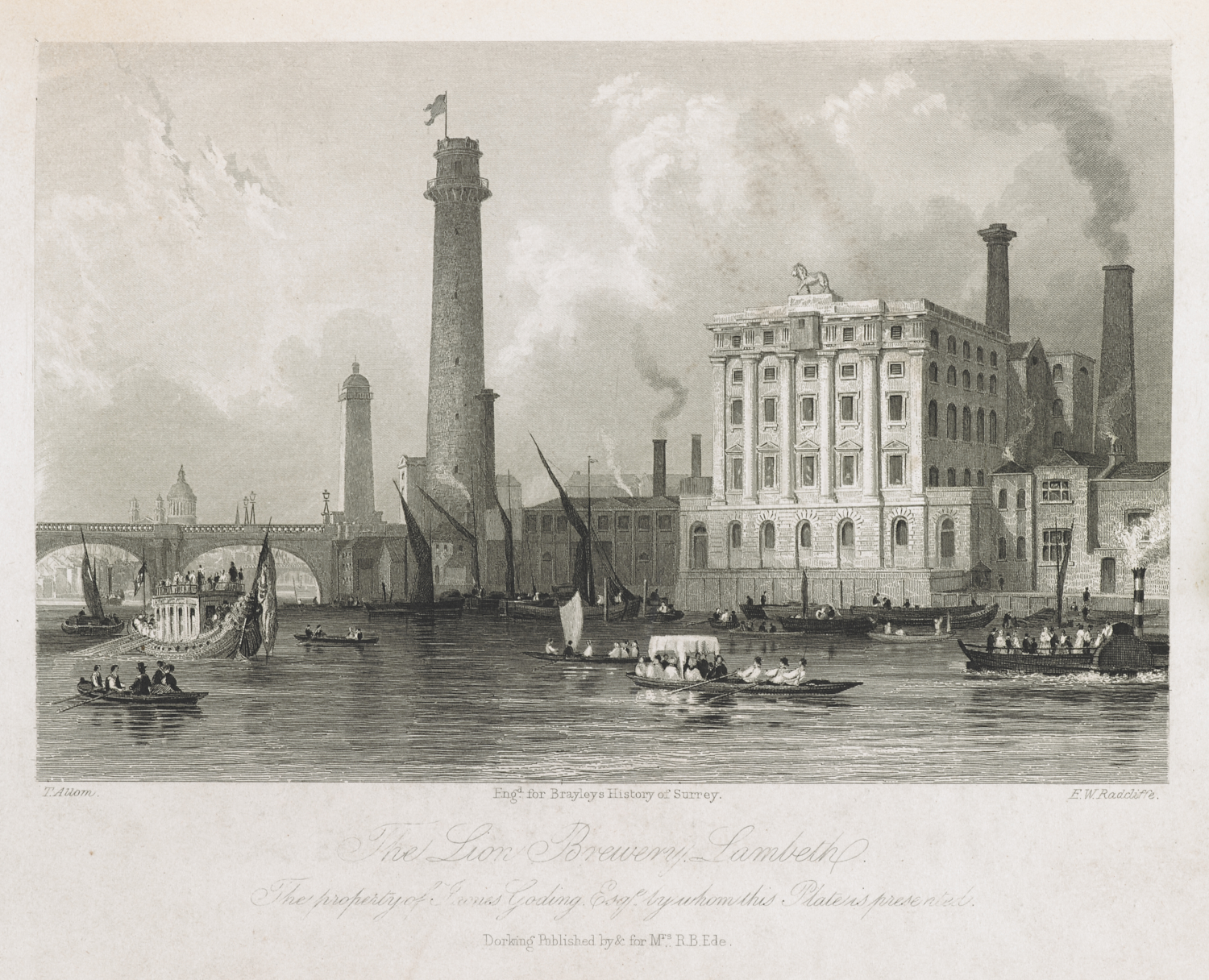
Illustration of The Lion Brewery (right) from A Topographical History of Surrey by E. W. Brayley

The original Lion Brewery was built on the southbank of the River Thames on Belvedere Road, next to Hungerford Bridge. The land was leased by James Goding, and brewery was built by the architect Francis Edwards on land that was then owned by the Archbishop of Canterbury at the time. The water used for brewing was sourced from the five wells inside the building, as opposed to river water from the Thames.

During the 19th century and under the Goding family, Lion Brewery supplied beer that was shipped by sea from Britain to trading outposts throughout the empire. In order to survive the gruelling six-month journey, brewers such as Lion Brewery had to increase the strength and quantity of hops in the beer to help preserve it for the long voyage Ales were thus shipped out from London in vast quantities by companies such as the East India Company, and later became known India Pale Ale (IPA).

In 1924, the company was taken over by the brewers Hoare and Co, of Wapping, was badly damaged by fire in 1931. The brewery building remained derelict until it was eventually demolished in 1949 to allow for the building of the Royal Festival Hall.

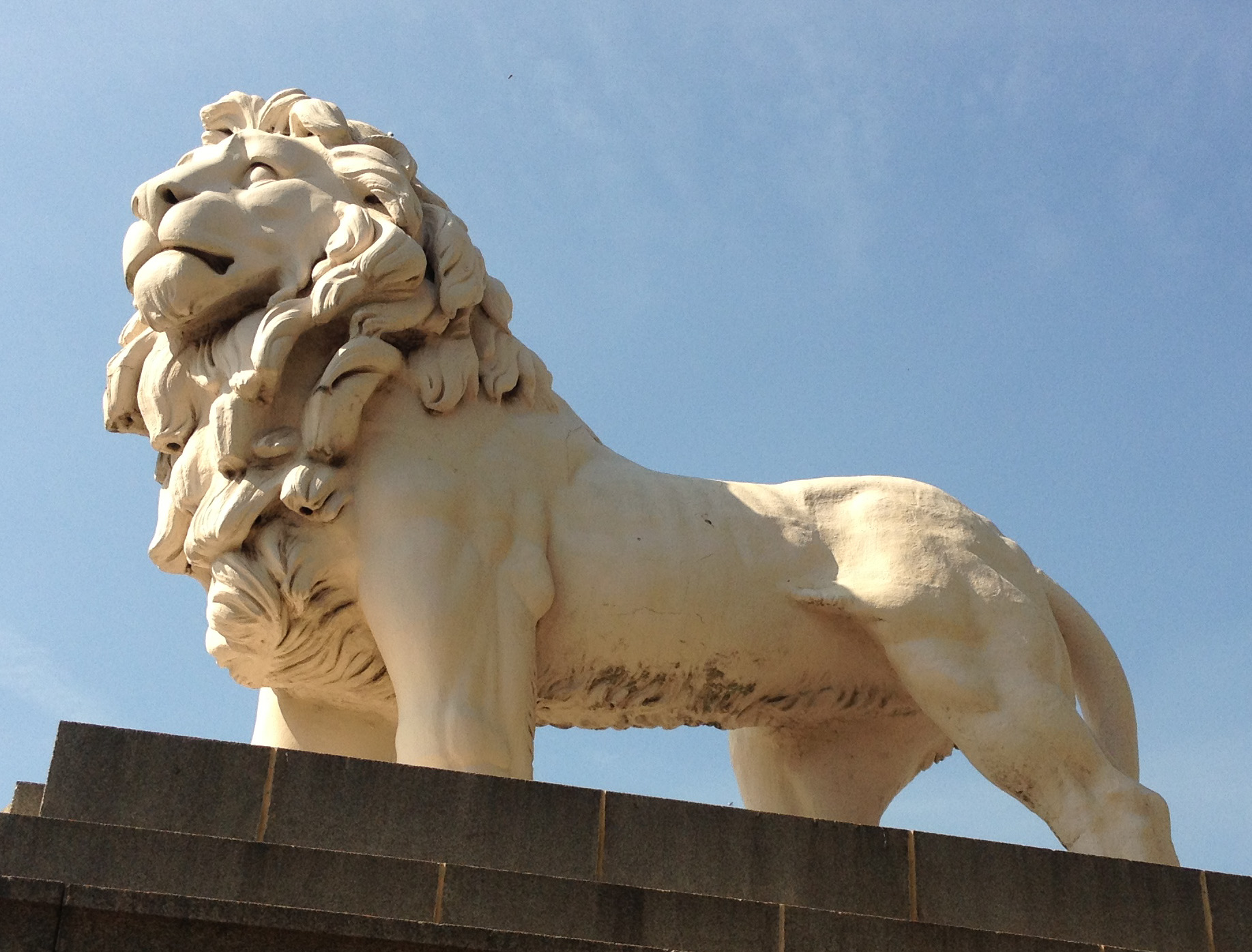
The South Bank Lion, which stood on the brewery parapet

=== Lion statues ===
There were originally three Coade Stone lion statues created for Lion Brewery by W.F. Woodington, a notable sculptor of the era. The most famous of these lions was the one that sat atop the brewery parapet. Just before the building was demolished, King George VI ordered that it be preserved, along with its surviving sibling lion which stood over one of the brewery gates. Both remain in London until this day. The one from the roof of the brewery is now known as the South Bank Lion, and can be found opposite the Houses of Parliament at the south end of Westminster Bridge. The other coade stone lion is now located at the west-gate entrance of Twickenham Stadium, the home of rugby. It was painted with gold leaf prior to the 1991 Rugby World Cup held in England.

== Lion Brewery 2.0 ==
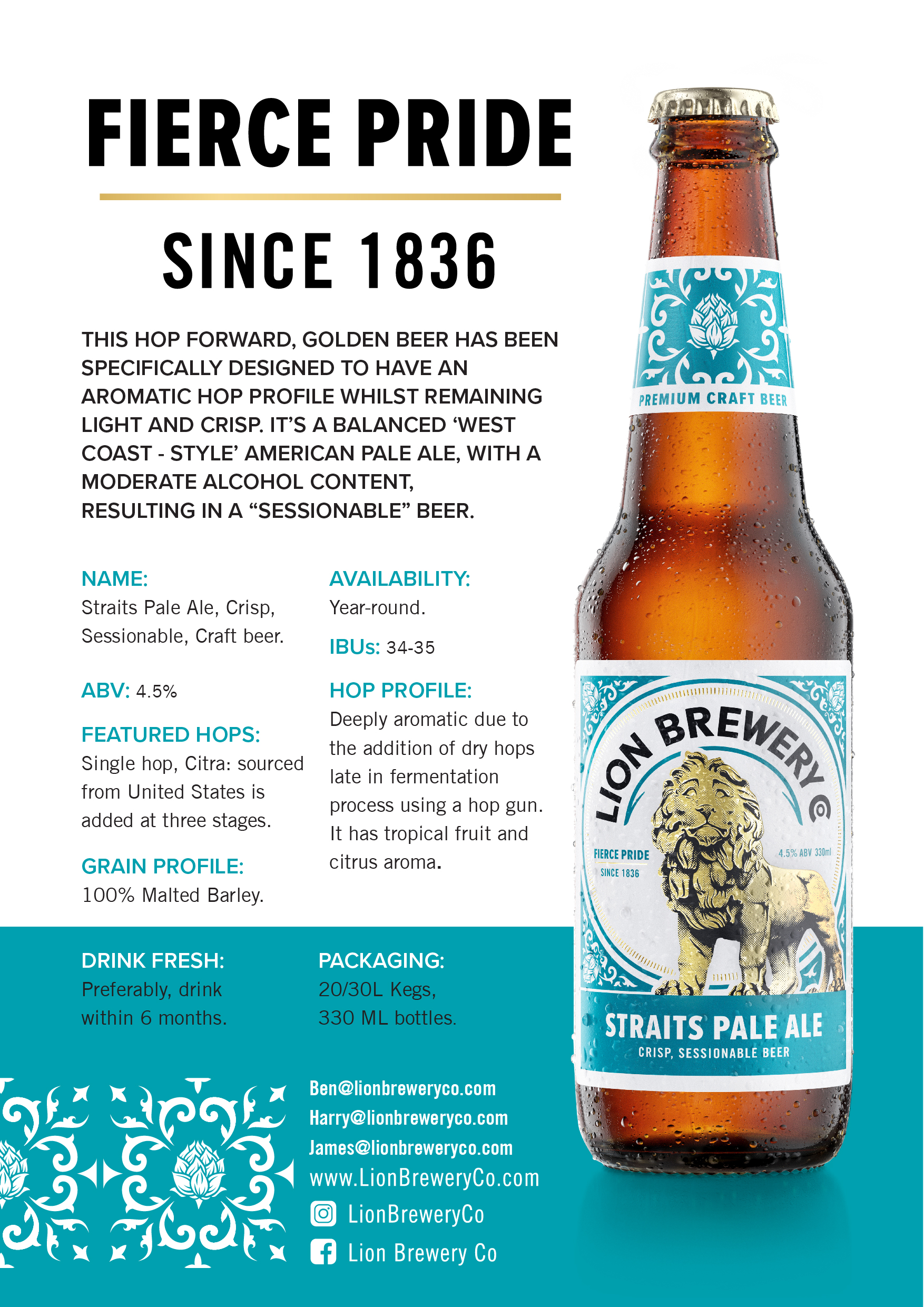
Straits Pale Ale info flyer

In 2017, "Lion Brewery" was re-licensed in the UK and Singapore by two Englishmen under the original trademark. By December 2018, the new Lion Brewery began trading, brewing beers in South-east Asia, with two beers, Straits Pale Ale and Island Lager, available in Singapore and Cambodia.
