= Herbert House (Hampton, Virginia) =

Historic house in Virginia, United States

- U.S. National Register of Historic Places
- Virginia Landmarks Register
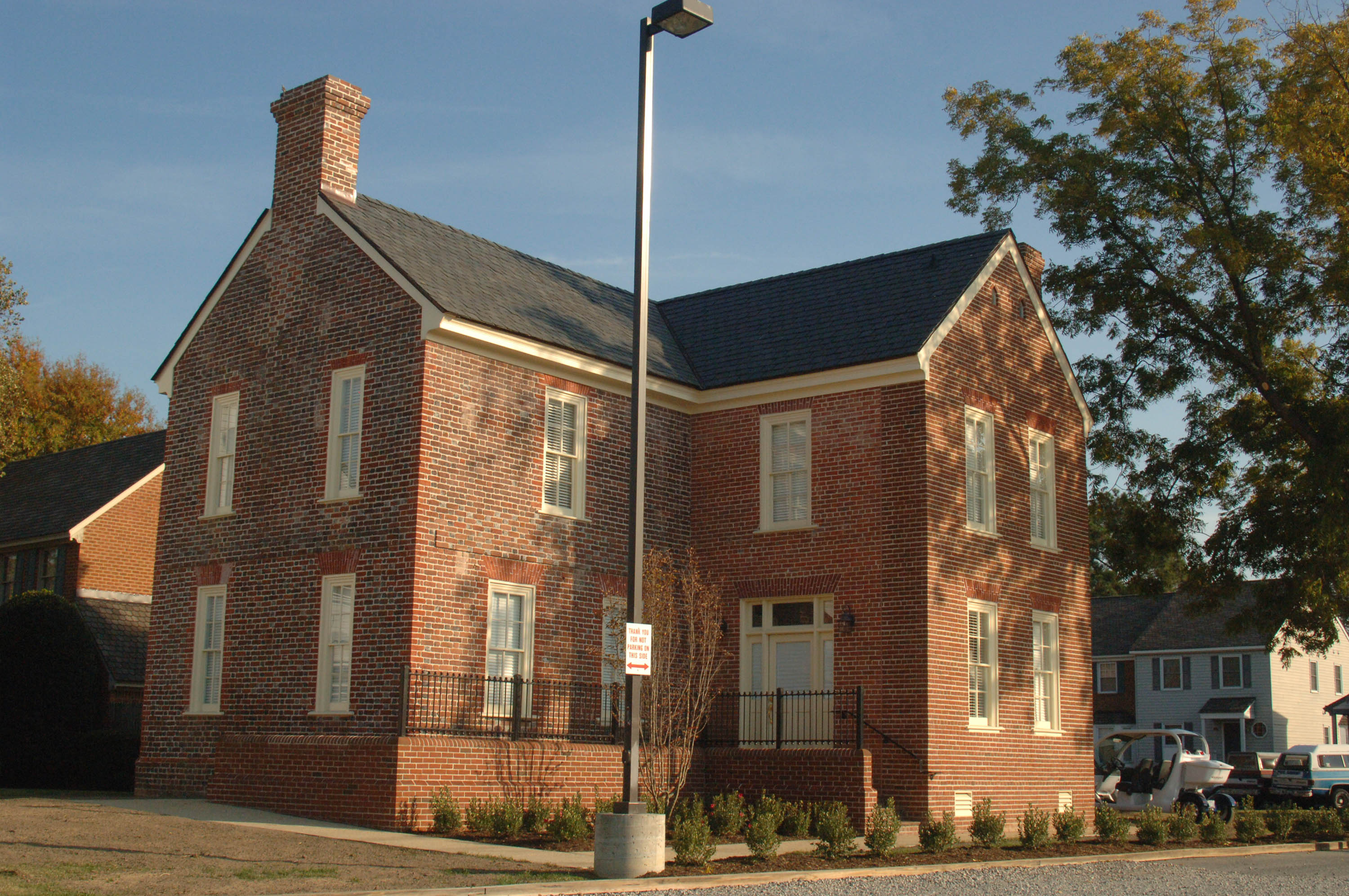
- Herbert House, November 2007

- Location within Virginia Location within the United States
- Location: E end of Marina Rd. on Hampton Creek, Hampton, Virginia
- Coordinates: 37°0′58″N 76°20′37″W
- Area: 3 acres (1.2 ha)
- Built: 1753
- Architectural style: Georgian
- NRHP reference No.: 72001504
- VLR No.: 114-0004

Significant dates
- Added to NRHP: February 23, 1972
- Designated VLR: November 16, 1971

Herbert House is a historic plantation home located at Hampton, Virginia. It was built in 1753 on the point of land where the Hampton River meets Sunset Creek near Hampton Roads, and is a two-story, U-shaped, brick and frame Georgian style dwelling. It has a two-level front porch with the second story enclosed.

It was listed on the National Register of Historic Places in 1972. By the late 20th century the farmland surrounding the house had been developed as a marina and townhomes and the long vacant house was in danger of collapse. Extensive renovations were made in the first decade of the 21st century to restore the historic house to its 18th-century appearance.
