= Alois Herbert Double House =

Historic house in Missouri, United States

- U.S. National Register of Historic Places
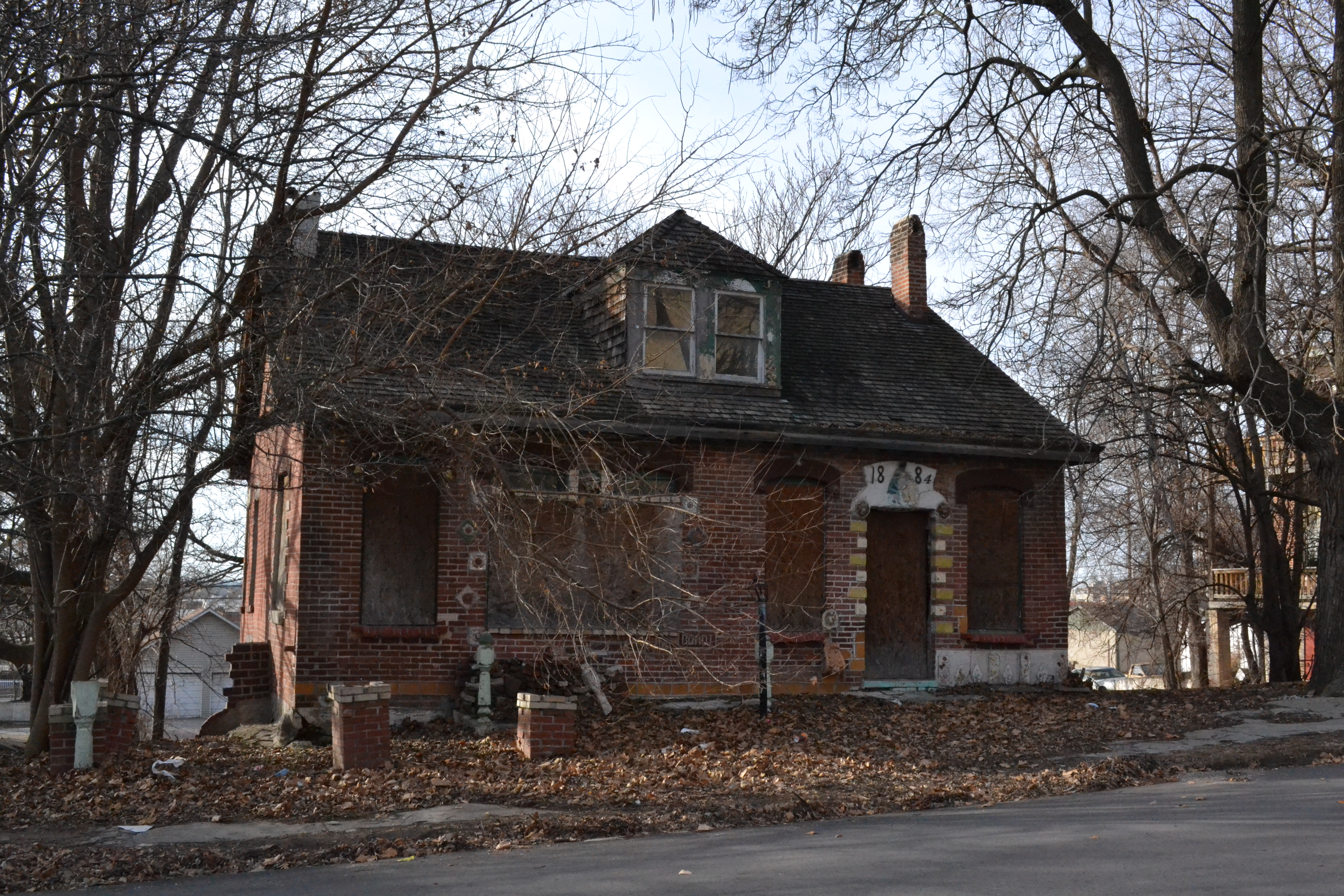

- Location within Missouri Location within the United States
- Location: 620 S. 10th St., St. Joseph, Missouri
- Coordinates: 39°45′50″N 94°50′54″W
- Area: less than one acre
- Built: 1851
- Architectural style: Greek Revival
- MPS: St. Joseph, Buchanan County, Missouri MPS AD
- NRHP reference No.: 06000992
- Added to NRHP: May 29, 2007

Alois Herbert Double House, also known as the Bohot Folk Art House, is a historic duplex located at St. Joseph, Missouri. It was built in 1851, and is a 1 1/2-story, rectangular, Greek Revival style brick dwelling. It has a low pitched side-gable roof with a hipped dormer. The front facade features folk art masonry appliques added in the latter part of the 20th century.

It was listed on the National Register of Historic Places in 2007.
