= St Peter's School, Vauxhall =

Former school in Vauxhall, London, England

Coordinates: 51.487046°N 0.118591°W

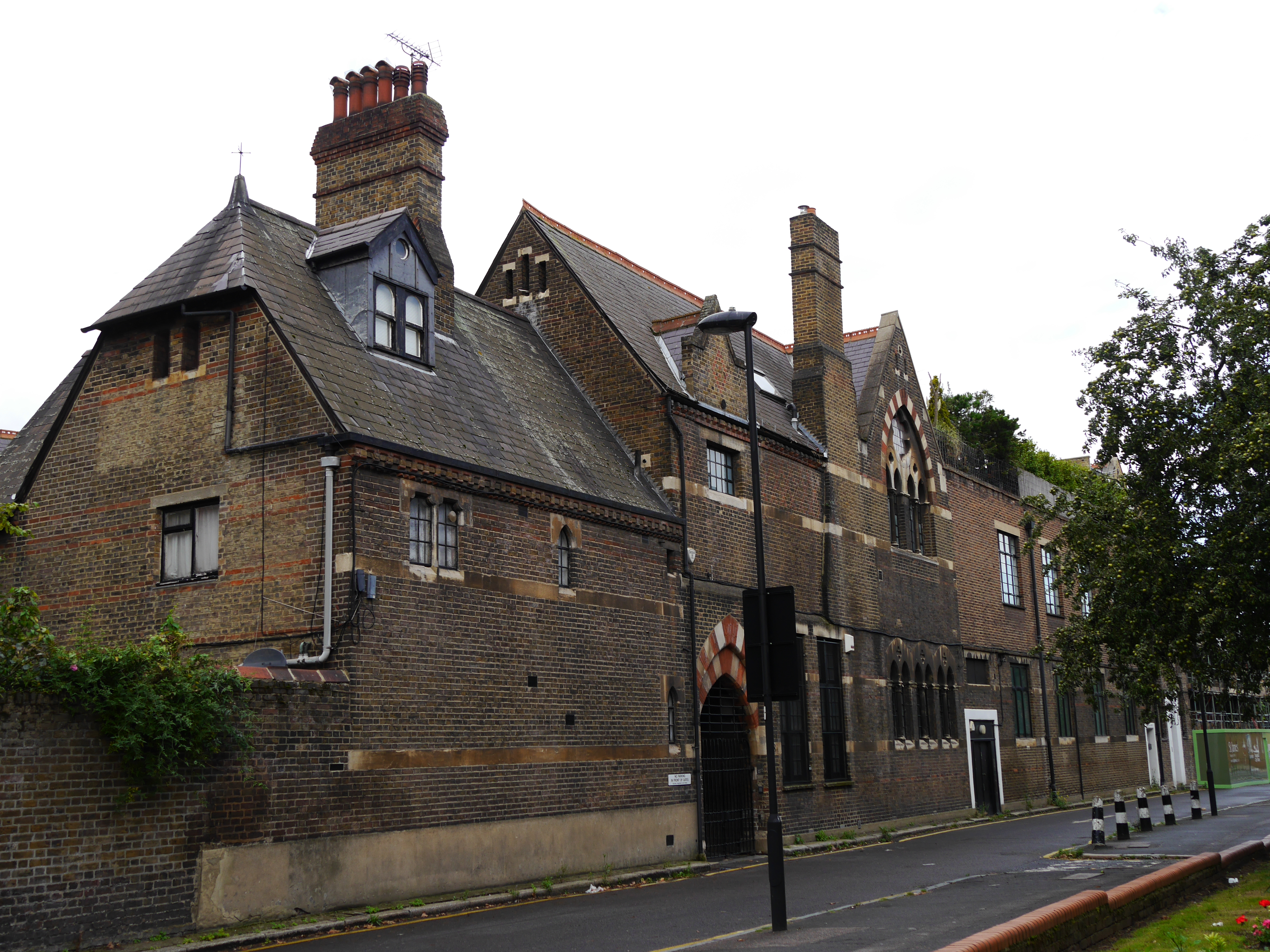
St Peter's School, 2014

St Peter's School is a former school at 38 St Oswald's Place, Vauxhall, London SE11.

It was built in 1860–61, designed by John Loughborough Pearson, and is Grade II* listed.

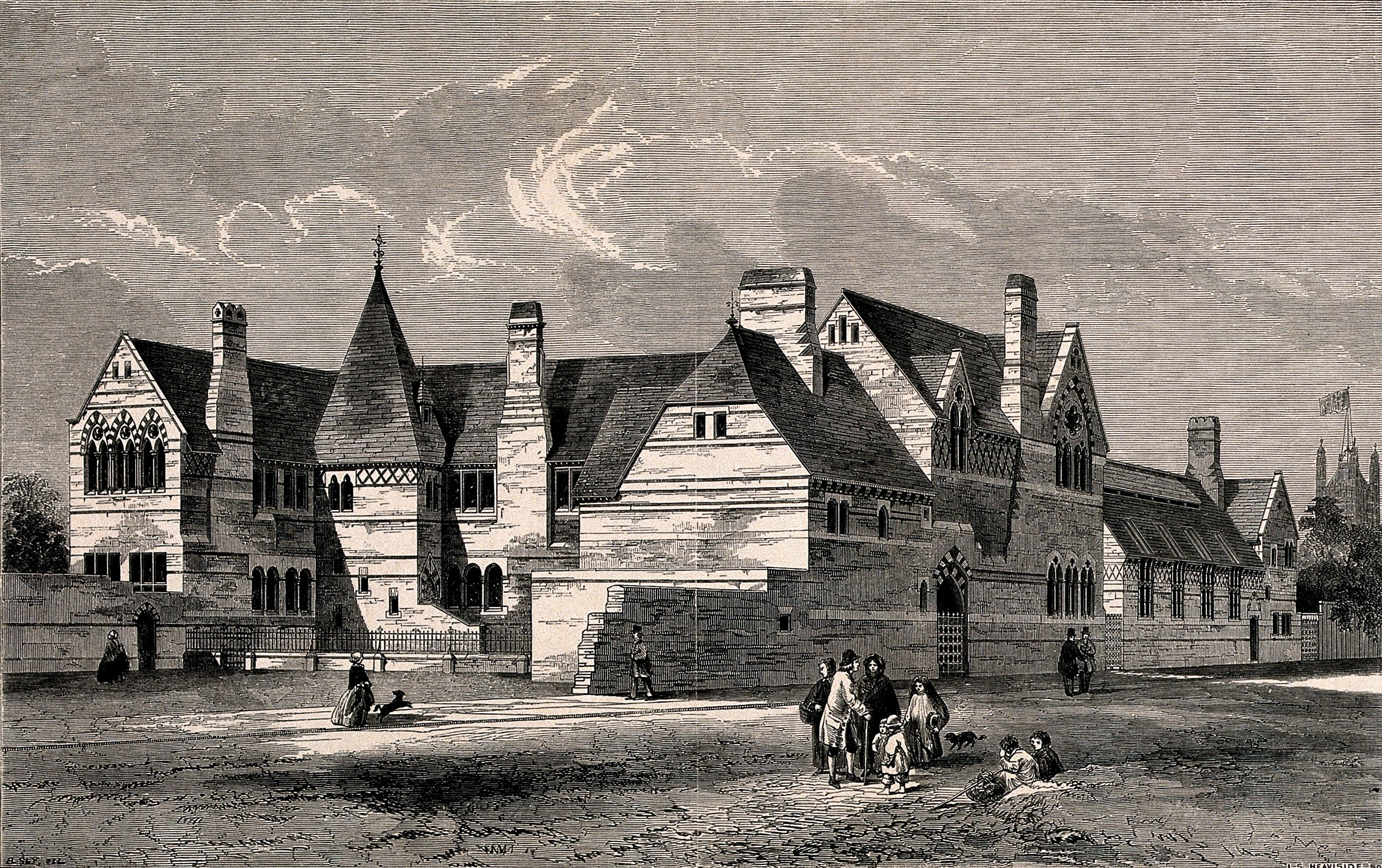
The school depicted in The Builder, 1860
