= Statue of Edward VI (Scheemakers) =

Bronze statue at St Thomas' Hospital, London

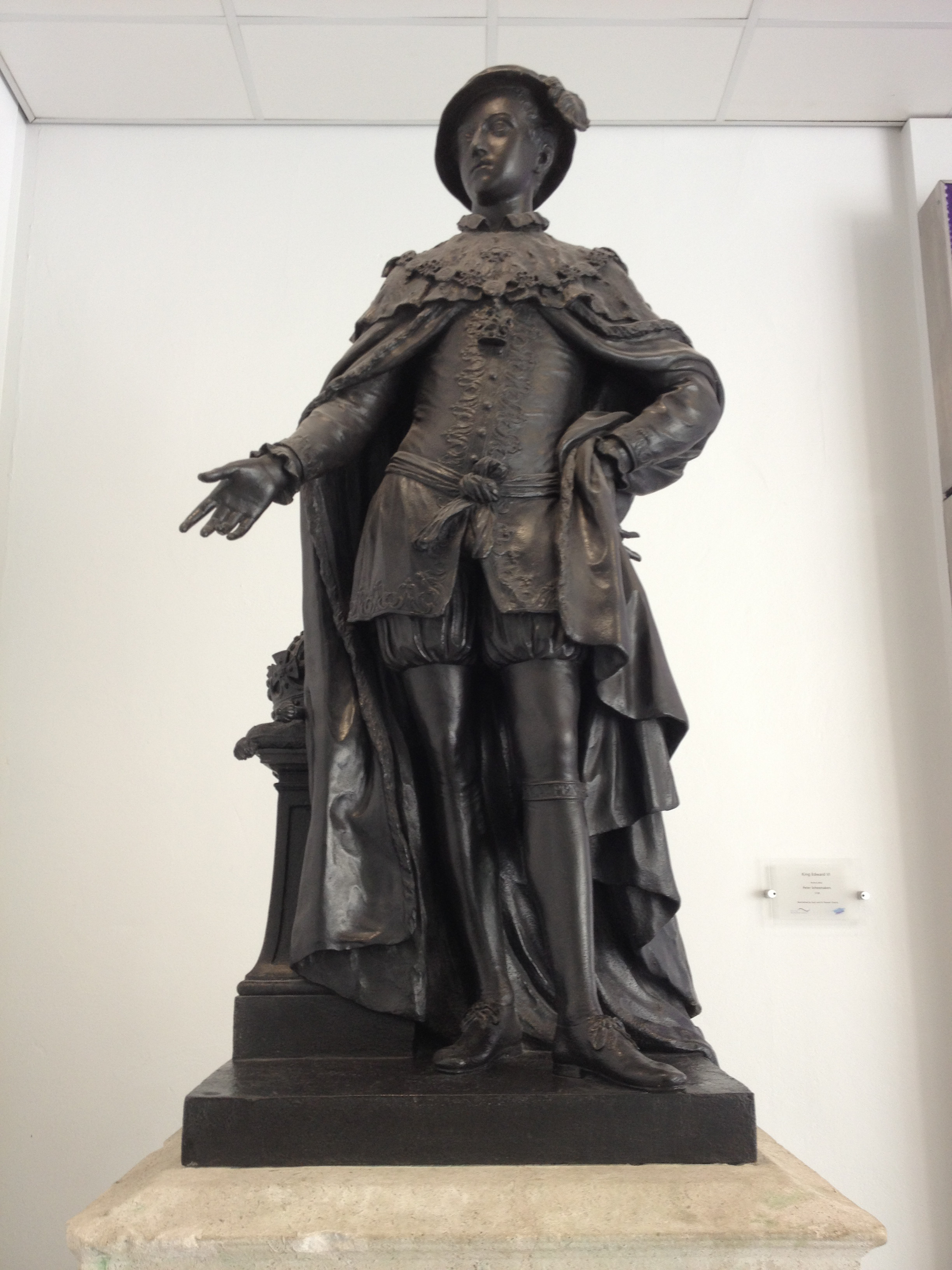
- Artist: Peter Scheemakers
- Completion date: 1739
- Type: Sculpture
- Medium: Bronze
- Subject: Edward VI
- Location: London; 51.4992°N 0.1195°W

Listed Building – Grade II*
- Official name: Bronze Statue of Edward VI
- Designated: 30 May 1979
- Reference no.: 1080372

The statue of Edward VI by Peter Scheemakers at St Thomas' Hospital, Lambeth, London is one of two statues of the king at the hospital. Both commemorate Edward VI's re-founding of the hospital in 1551. It was moved to its current location inside the North Wing of the hospital in the 20th century. The sculpture was designated a Grade II* listed structure in 1979.

== History ==
=== Edward VI ===
Edward VI was the son of Henry VIII and his third queen, Jane Seymour. Born on 12 October 1537, he succeed his father at the age of nine in 1547 but never attained his majority, dying aged 15 in 1553. During the Reformation St Thomas', as a religious foundation, was deprived of its revenues and estates and was closed in 1540. In 1551, Edward granted a charter for the hospital's refounding.

=== St Thomas' Hospital ===
The origin of St Thomas' Hospital was the sick house attached to the Church of St Mary Overie in Southwark, founded in the 12th century. By the late 17th century, the hospital was in a dilapidated state and Sir Robert Clayton, the hospital's President, employed the architect, and St Thomas' governor, Thomas Cartwright to undertake complete rebuilding. The new buildings, of red brick and in a classical style were completed just after Clayton's death, in 1709. The statue of Edward was erected in a courtyard of the rebuilt complex in 1739. In 1872, following the complete reconstruction of the hospital on a site further up the River Thames at Lambeth, the statue was moved to the new site and has been repositioned subsequently.

== Description ==
The sculptor Peter Scheemakers came from a family of sculptors. Of Flemish origin, both his father and his two sons worked in the profession. He came to London some time before 1720 and made his reputation with the bust of William Shakespeare in Westminster Abbey in 1740. (Note: Scheemakers was noted both for his ability and his arrogance, and was often dismissive of the work of his contemporary artists. He said of himself; "I'm an impudent little fellow, no matter I can't help it", and his patron, the Duke of Portland, described him as the first in the country for assurance and impertinence.) His statue of Edward VI predates that work. In bronze, the effigy shows the king in period dress. The inscription on the plinth records that the cost of the sculpture was met by Charles Toye Esq., Treasurer of the hospital. The sculpture was designated a Grade II* listed structure in 1979.

== Sources ==
- Blackwood, John (1989). London's Immortals: The Complete Outdoor Commemorative Statues. London: Savoy Press. ISBN 0-9514296-0-4. OCLC 21328602.
- Cherry, Bridget; Pevsner, Nikolaus (2002), London 2: South, The Buildings of England, New Haven, US, London, UK: Yale University Press, ISBN 9780140710472, OCLC 50783156
