= Statue of Robert Clayton =

Sculpture by Grinling Gibbons

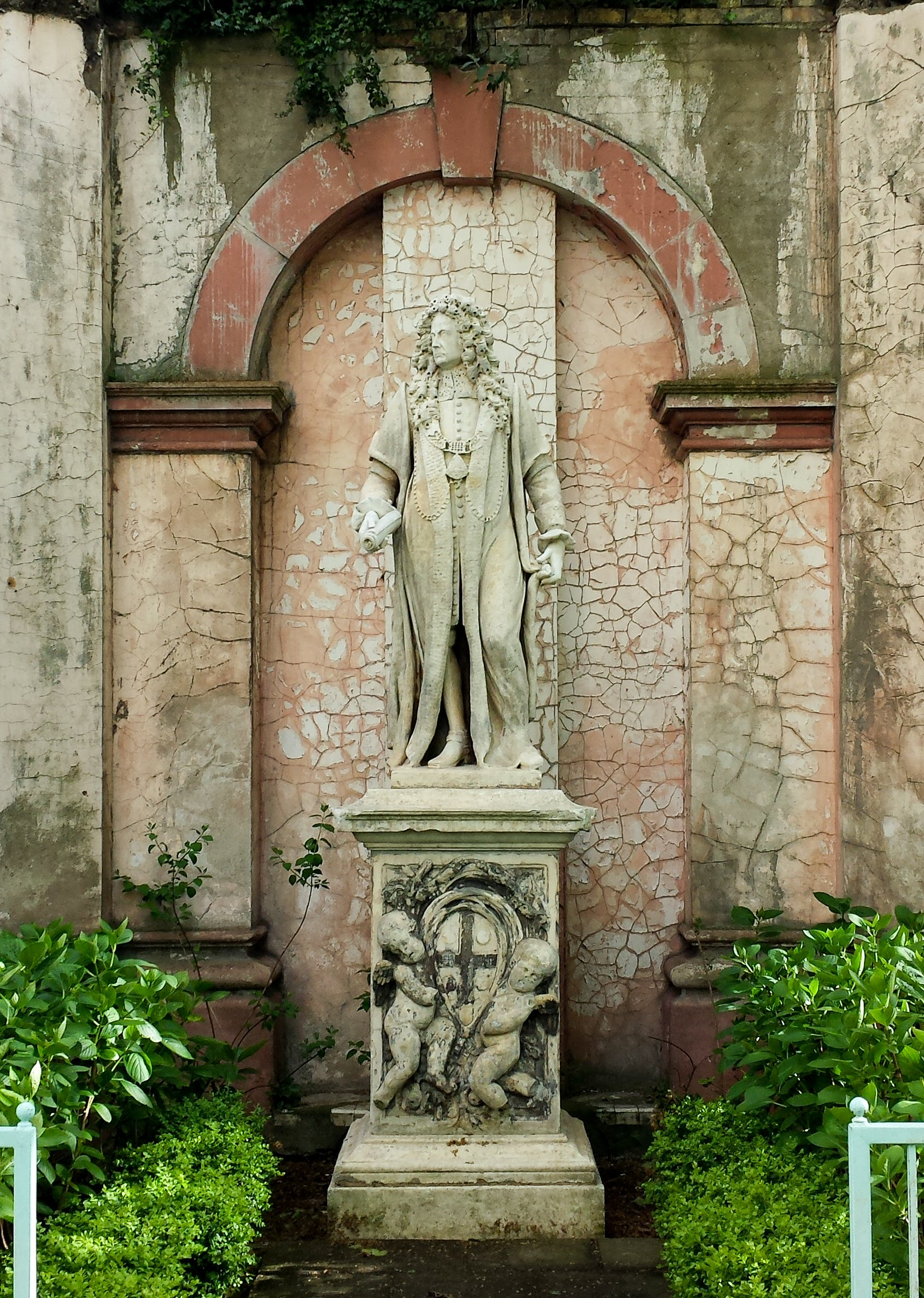
- The statue in 2015
- Artist: Grinling Gibbons
- Completion date: c. 1714
- Type: Sculpture
- Medium: Marble
- Subject: Sir Robert Clayton
- Location: Lambeth, London; 51.4992°N 0.1201°W

Listed Building – Grade I
- Official name: Statue of Robert Clayton at North Entrance to Ward Block of North Wing at St Thomas' Hospital
- Designated: 30 May 1979
- Reference no.: 1319925

The statue of Robert Clayton stands at the entrance to the North Wing of St Thomas' Hospital, Lambeth, London. The sculptor was Grinling Gibbons, and the statue was executed around 1700–1714. Sir Robert was a banker, politician and Lord Mayor of London. As President of St Thomas', he was responsible for the complete rebuilding of the hospital, and associated church in the late 17th century. The statue was designated a Grade I listed structure in 1979.

== History ==
Robert Clayton was born in 1629, the son of "a poor man of no family". Working firstly as a land agent and subsequently as a banker, he made a large fortune such that, by the 1670s, the diarist John Evelyn, described him as "this prince of citizens, there never having been any, who, for the stateliness of his palace, prodigious feasting, and magnificence, exceeded him". Clayton became an M.P., served on innumerable parliamentary committees and in 1692 was made President of St Thomas' Hospital, an office he held until his death in 1707.

The origin of St Thomas' Hospital was the sick house attached to the Church of St Mary Overie in Southwark, founded in the 12th century. By the late 17th century, the hospital was in a dilapidated state and Clayton employed the architect, and St Thomas' governor, Thomas Cartwright to undertake complete rebuilding. The new buildings, of red brick and in a classical style were completed just after Clayton's death, in 1709. The statue was commissioned at some time around this date, to commemorate Clayton's contribution to the hospital. Dates for the actual construction vary; Pevsner gives 1701–1702, which is supported by the Survey of London. Historic England's listing designation gives a slightly later date of 1714, supported by an inscription on the statue's plinth. The commission for the statue was awarded to Grinling Gibbons. Gibbons was paid £50 "to cutt the said Statue in the best Statue Marble by Christmas next" and a further £150 "as soon as the Work is finished".

Following the complete reconstruction of the hospital in 1872, on a site further up the River Thames at Lambeth, the statue was moved to its present position. The work was listed at Grade I, the highest grading given to buildings and structures of "exceptional interest", in 1979.

== Removal of the statue ==
The murder of George Floyd in the United States on 25 May 2020 led to Black Lives Matter protests around the globe, including in the United Kingdom. A demonstration in Bristol organised by the Black Lives Matter movement culminated in the toppling of the statue of Edward Colston due to Colston's involvement in the slave trade. The toppling of Colston's statue also led to calls for other statues commemorating individuals with a connection to the slave trade to be removed. Clayton was a shareholder in, and assistant to, the slave-trading Royal African Company, founded in 1660. On 11 June 2020, a joint statement from the Guy's and St Thomas' NHS Foundation Trust announced that Clayton's statue, together with that of Thomas Guy, would be removed from public view.

== Description ==
The statue is carved in marble, and stands on a marble plinth. Clayton is depicted in his robes, with a periwig and pigtail, and carrying a scroll. The plinth is decorated with cherubs and bears an inscription in Latin. Fragments of decoration on the pedestal suggest that it was once painted.

== Sources ==
- Blackwood, John (1989). London's Immortals: The Complete Outdoor Commemorative Statues. London: Savoy Press. ISBN 0-9514296-0-4. OCLC 21328602.
- Cherry, Bridget; Pevsner, Nikolaus (2002), London 2: South, The Buildings of England, New Haven, US, London, UK: Yale University Press, ISBN 9780140710472, OCLC 50783156
- Darke, Jo (1991), The Monument Guide to England and Wales: A National Portrait in Bronze and Stone, London: MacDonald and Co., OCLC 1008240876
- Harris, Tim; Taylor, Stephen (2015), The Final Crisis of the Stuart Monarchy: The Revolutions of 1688–91 in Their British, Atlantic and European Contexts, Boydell & Brewer, ISBN 9781783270446
