= Herbert House, Kennington =

House in Kennington, London, England

Coordinates: 51.486619°N 0.118896°W

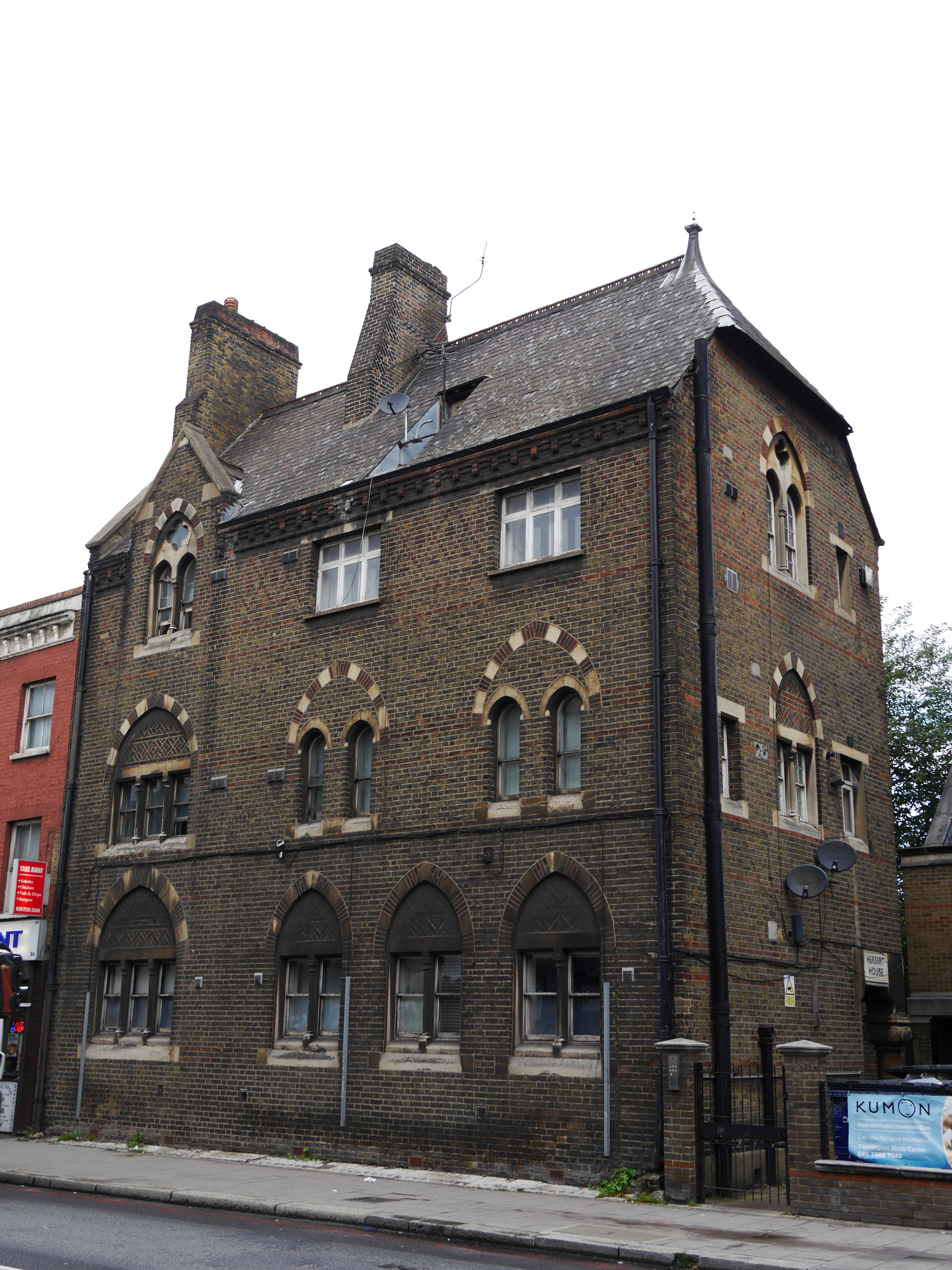
Herbert House

Herbert House is a Grade II* listed is a former orphanage (now apartments) at 312 Kennington Lane, Kennington, Kennington, London SE11.

It was built in 1860–62 by J. L. Pearson as St Peter's Orphanage and Training College for "the daughters of clergy and professionals".
