= Statue of Edward VI (Cartwright) =

Stone statue at St Thomas' Hospital, London

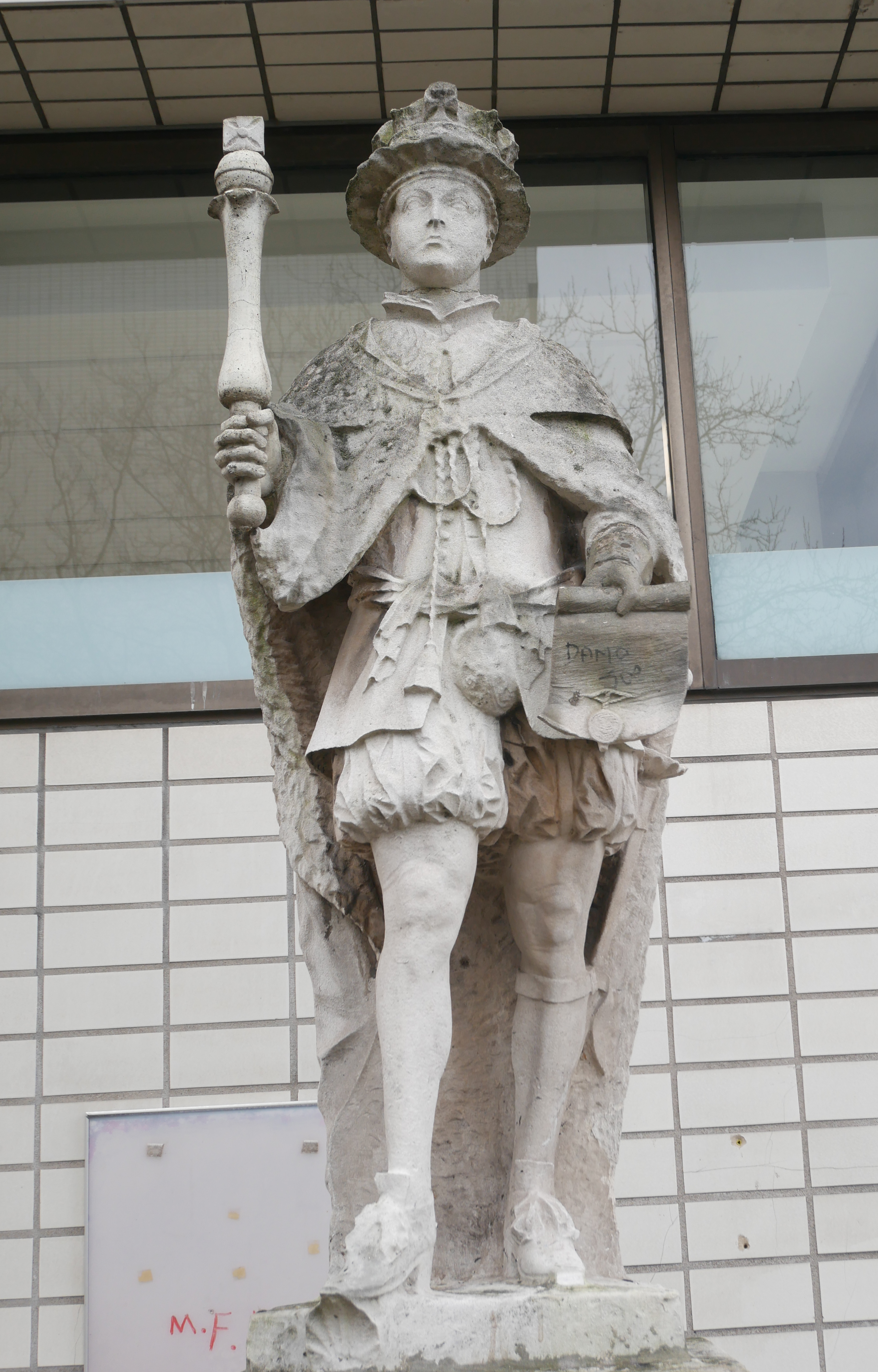
- Artist: Thomas Cartwright
- Completion date: 1682
- Type: Sculpture
- Medium: Purbeck marble
- Subject: Edward VI
- Location: London; 51.4998°N 0.1188°W

Listed Building – Grade II*
- Official name: Stone Statue of Edward VI
- Designated: 30 May 1979
- Reference no.: 1319933

The statue of Edward VI by Thomas Cartwright at St Thomas' Hospital, Lambeth, London is one of two statues of that king at the hospital. Both commemorate Edward's re-founding of the institution in 1551. The statue was designed by Nathaniel Hanwell and carved by Thomas Cartwright in 1682, during the rebuilding undertaken by Sir Robert Clayton when President of the hospital. The statue originally formed the centrepiece of a group of figures which adorned the gateway on Borough High Street. It was moved to its current location at the north entrance to the North Wing on Lambeth Palace Road in the 20th century. It was designated a Grade II* listed structure in 1979.

== History ==
=== Edward VI ===
Edward VI was the son of Henry VIII and his third queen, Jane Seymour. Born on 12 October 1537, he succeed his father at the age of nine in 1547 but never attained his majority, dying aged 15 in 1553. During the Reformation St Thomas', as a religious foundation, was deprived of its revenues and estates and was closed in 1540. In 1551, Edward granted a charter for the hospital's refounding.

=== St Thomas' Hospital ===
The origin of St Thomas' Hospital was the sick house attached to the Church of St Mary Overie in Southwark, founded in the 12th century. By the late 17th century, the hospital was in a dilapidated state and Sir Robert Clayton, the hospital's President, employed Thomas Cartwright, a master mason and a governor of St Thomas', to undertake complete rebuilding. Cartwright had worked as a mason for Christopher Wren at St Paul's Cathedral. The new buildings, of red brick and in a classical style, were completed just after Clayton's death, in 1709. The statue of Edward, along with its accompanying figures, decorated a gateway in the new complex. In 1872, following the complete reconstruction of the hospital on land further up the River Thames at Lambeth, the statue was moved to the new site and has been repositioned subsequently.

== Description ==
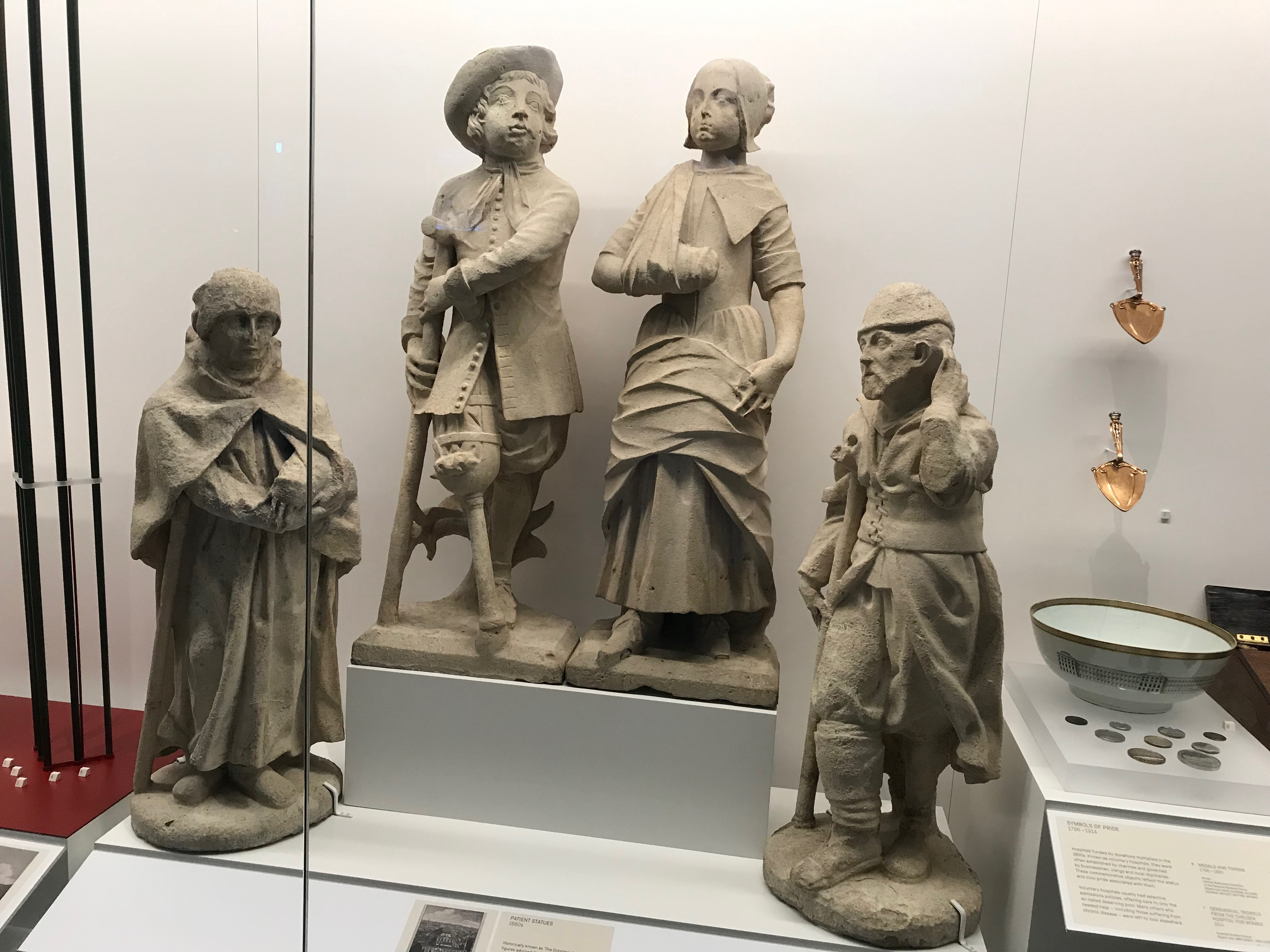
The statues of hospital patients which formerly accompanied that of the king, on display at the Science Museum

The statue was commissioned by Robert Clayton, designed by Nathaniel Hanwell and carved by Thomas Cartwright. It formed the centrepiece of a grouping that stood on the gateway to the hospital from Borough High Street. The king was originally flanked by carvings of two pairs of disabled figures; since 2019 these have been on display at the Science Museum. The statue is of Purbeck limestone and the order for "effigies of King Edward the Sixth and fower cripples to be carved in stone" was placed on 11 November 1681. Cartwright charged £190 for the work.

The king is portrayed in Tudor clothing and wearing a crown. He holds a sceptre in his right hand and the charter authorising the re-establishment of St Thomas' in his left. (Note: At some point prior to a September 2013 photograph, the right arm had been damaged and removed. Photographic evidence shows that it had been repaired and replaced by February 2016.) The statue stands on a modern plinth. The statue was listed as a Grade II* structure in 1979.

== Sources ==
- Blackwood, John (1989). London's Immortals: The Complete Outdoor Commemorative Statues. London: Savoy Press. ISBN 0-9514296-0-4. OCLC 21328602.
- Cherry, Bridget; Pevsner, Nikolaus (2002), London 2: South, The Buildings of England, New Haven, US, London, UK: Yale University Press, ISBN 9780140710472, OCLC 50783156
