= St Peter's Church, Streatham =

Church in South London, England

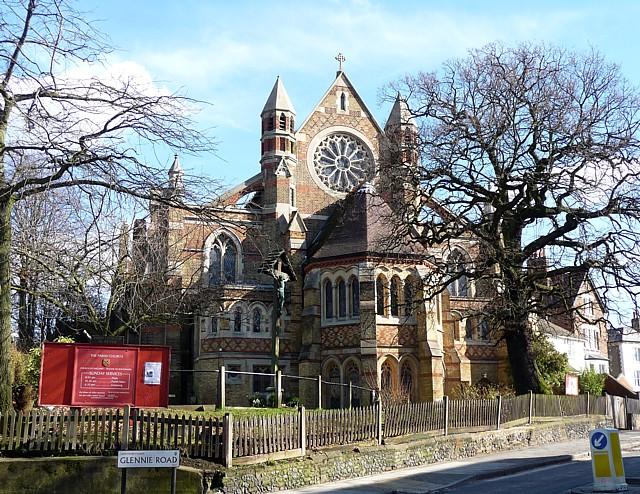
- St Peter's Church, Streatham
- 51.4319°N 0.1148°W
- Denomination: Church of England
- Churchmanship: Anglo-Catholic
- Website: https://stpeters-streatham.org/

Architecture
- Architect(s): Richard Drew & George Fellowes Prynne

Administration
- Province: Canterbury
- Diocese: Diocese of Southwark
- Archdeaconry: Lambeth
- Deanery: Lambeth South Deanery

Clergy
- Vicar: Rev Steffan Mathias

St Peter's Church is an Anglican church in the London Borough of Lambeth. It is a Grade II* listed building and occupies a prominent position in Leigham Court Road, Streatham.

== Parish ==
Until Streatham Hill and West Norwood railway stations were opened in 1856, the area that became St Peter's parish was mainly rural, with some large villas along Leigham Court Road and Crown Lane. The advent of the railway that links these stations with Victoria Station stimulated residential development including additional large houses and also substantial numbers of more modest semi-detached and terraced properties.

The parish of St Peter, Streatham, was formed from parts of the parishes of St Leonard's, Streatham, and St Luke's, West Norwood. In about 1866 a temporary iron church, dedicated to St Peter and St Paul, was erected on the west side of Leigham Court Road, opposite the site of the present structure. The parish of St Peter was formed in 1870, the year in which the initial portion of the present church building, which had been designed by Richard Drew, was consecrated by Samuel Wilberforce, Bishop of Winchester. In 1886–87, after further funds had become available, the church was enlarged in accordance with plans by George Fellowes Prynne.

In 1886, the population of St Peter's parish amounted to 2,889 and was served by three clergy. The total (morning and evening) attendance as a proportion of the parochial population at that time stood at 39.9%. In 1901, the population of the parish had increased to 4,780 and the number of clergymen in the following year was still three with attendance at its services representing 19.5% of the parochial population.

Based on statistics from the UK census, the Diocese of Southwark estimates the population of St Peter's parish was 12,400 in 2001 and 14,300 in 2011.

== Building ==
St Peter's Church is a Grade II* listed building standing in a prominent position on the east side of Leigham Court Road immediately south of its junction with Glennie Road. The building takes full advantage of its position on rising ground facing a curve in the road. Much use is made of polychrome brickwork which, combined with clay tile roofing, turrets, varied fenestration, a stair-turret and a large wheel-window give the west frontage an asymmetrical but picturesque appearance. Taking advantage of the lie of the land, the ground floor of the west end of the building houses a set of parish rooms. The worship area occupies the upper part of the entire structure, being reached by a flight of steps and a ramp that lead to an entrance that opens on to the higher ground towards the east end of the site.

The Church suffered wartime damage to the stained glass (below), and also to the external round turret which was destroyed by a flying bomb.

The interior of the church was rearranged in the late 1980s under the direction of Derek Philips RIBA. The altar was moved to the west end of the building (which had originally been the baptistry) and the east end is now used as a day chapel with choir stalls.

Much of the stained glass was lost as a result of the wartime bomb damage.

On the north wall, the only remaining stained glass are fragments at the top of the tracery. One of these is dedicated to Georgina Tarbutt, wife of the first Vicar. These fragments were made by the stained glass company Ward and Hughes. The window over St Paul's altar and the relocated font again is now only just the section in the tracery; this window is possibly by Clayton and Bell and shows four angels holding ribbons displaying a verse from 1 Kings 21:17.

The rose window in the west wall is above the relocated altar; it displays the 12 disciples (with Mathias in place of Judas). It was reinstated by Lawrence Lee after the War, and further restored in 1994.

The former baptistry is now the sanctuary for the relocated altar. There are nine windows in it, designed by Lawrence Lee. There are three windows symbolising baptism; the other six symbolise the other traditional sacraments.

On the south wall, one of the few remaining windows consists of fragments of the Queen Victoria memorial window. This is notable for having been erected as early as March 1901. The window was made by Chater & Son, to a design by G V Ostrehan.

One of the two windows in the walls of the Lady Chapel survived the wartime bombing, although its designer is not recorded. There are a further eight windows dedicated to the Virgin Mary over the altar.

The east window above the original location of the High Altar was erected in 1955 to a design by Lawrence Lee.

The organ is a four-manual William Hill & Sons; despite the damage to the windows, the organ survived unscathed.

There is a choir and a youth choir. The Church offers an annual choral scholarship.

== War memorial ==
The war memorial, which was unveiled in 1922, is separately Grade II listed. It was restored and re-dedicated in 2018 by Christopher Chessun, Bishop of Southwark.

== Vicars ==
- Arthur Charles Tarbutt, 1870–1890. Fr Tarbutt died in office.
- Henry Baron Dickinson, 1890–1904. Subsequently Vicar of St Stephen's Lewisham, 1904–1922.
- Edward Jervis, 1904–1918. Fr Jervis died in office.
- Herbert Charles Frith, 1919–1927. Subsequently Prebendary of Firle at Chichester Cathedral 1937–1952; buried at Boxgrove Priory.
- Richard Frederick Morson, 1927–1941. Subsequently Rector of St Mary's Meppershall, where he died in office.
- Walter Gould, 1941–1949.
- Charles David Smith, 1949–1968.
- Michael Woodgate, 1969–1984. Subsequently a Catholic convert, and then a Roman Catholic priest.
- Dr John Hall, 1984–1992. Subsequently Dean of Westminster, 2006–2019.
- Andrew Walker, 1993–1998. Subsequently Vicar of St Mary's, Bourne Street since 2017.
- Peter Andrews, 1998–2019. Fr Andrews retired.
- Steffan Mathias, since 2020.

(Some incumbents have been priests-in charge.)

== Directors of Music ==
- Dr Benjamin Agutter, 1866–1905.
- Bernard Greek Stoneman, 1905–1929.
- Stanley Ingham, 1929–1957.
- Frederick Waterman, 1958–1962.
- Michael Kerton, 1963–1979.
- Stephen Lloyd, 1979–1984.
- John Brierley, 1985–1987.
- Michael Stoddart, 1987–1989. Subsequently organist & choirmaster at St George's Paris, St Mary's Portsea, and Newcastle Cathedral.
- Norman Harper, 1989–1995. Subsequently director of music at St George's Cathedral, Southwark.
- Simon Lewis, 1995–1996. Subsequently organist at the National Shrine of Our Lady of Willesden.
- Mark Levett, 1996–1998.
- David Abbott, 1998–1999.
- David Cresswell, 2000–2008. Subsequently organist at St Nicholas's Chiswick.
- Philip Collin, 2008–2015. Subsequently musical director of St Peter's Consort, a mixed voice chamber choir in Wakefield.
- Nick Graham, 2016–2018. Subsequently director of girl choristers at Holy Trinity Guildford.
- Will Mason, 2019
- James Furniss-Roe, 2021–

(The director of music was originally called organist and choirmaster.)
