= G (magazine) =

Constructivist magazine

G: Material zur elementaren Gestaltung (Materials for Elementary Construction) was a constructivist magazine published between 1923 and 1926 by Hans Richter. Five issues were produced, with El Lissitzky and Werner Graeff supporting him on the editorial board for the first issue. Ludwig Mies van der Rohe and Frederick John Kiesler joined the board on subsequent issues.

== Issue 1 ==
In Issue 1, they stated that their task was "to clarify the general situation of art and life." They reproduced extracts from the Realistic Manifesto by Antoine Pevsner and Naum Gabo.
