= Daniel A. Baker =

English artist

Daniel Baker is an artist and producer of alternative comics. He was born in Bath, England. He lives and works in London.

The first issue of Baker's new comic series Donkey Head was published in 2005, and launched at the Clown Museum in east London.

He has been involved in many exhibitions, including This Much is Certain at the Royal College of Art in London and a solo show at The Modern Institute in Glasgow.

Throughout 2007 he was Artist in Residence at the Old Operating Theatre Museum and Herb Garret in London where he developed his Paper Theatre Projects. In this new series of sculptures, drawings, and slideshows, Baker re-invents the popular toy theatre of the 18th and 19th Century as a tool to explore discourses of sight, medicine, technology, and the history of ephemeral media.
