= Donkey Head =

Comic book series

Donkey Head is an independently published series of alternative comics created by the artist Daniel A. Baker.

The author describes its conception as "William Blake does The Adventures of Tintin." The narrative involves a young man named Eric, and his journey into a strange world as he follows George, the donkey-headed man of the series title.

Comparisons have been made with the film Donnie Darko, the early comic strip Little Nemo, the works of Marcel Dzama, the film Harvey, and the character Nick Bottom, from Shakespeare's A Midsummer Night's Dream.

The first episode, "The Giant Vacuum Cleaner," was published in 2005. In this episode, the giant household appliance haunts a cavernous space beneath the Hoover Building in Perivale. The drawing style has more in common with children's book illustrations than with the Marvel Comics aesthetic. Produced in an unusual combination of graphite and ink, the work has a hand-drawn quality.

Somewhat like Tony Millionaire's Maakies, the narrative of Donkey Head is actually binary. A strip runs along the bottom of each page, embellishing character and back-story detail.

== Reviews ==
"....Along with William Blake, cultural influences that inform the continued work include Dante, Jonathan Swift and even David Lynch ... Another influence, visually, would appear to be Marcel Dzama, who also takes inspiration from Dante. Both convincingly portray the fragility of human characters having embarked, like Tintin... on an adventure into the unknown..." Phillip Marsden, a-n Magazine

"....Donkey Head is a comic about the junction between memory and dreams and the space that mystery inhabits. It's also a great read, and features a great big vacuum cleaner toward the end. Comics need more enormous vacuum cleaners, and this doesn't fail to provide....." Bugpowder Comics
