= Old Operating Theatre Museum and Herb Garret =

The Old Operating Theatre Museum & Herb Garret
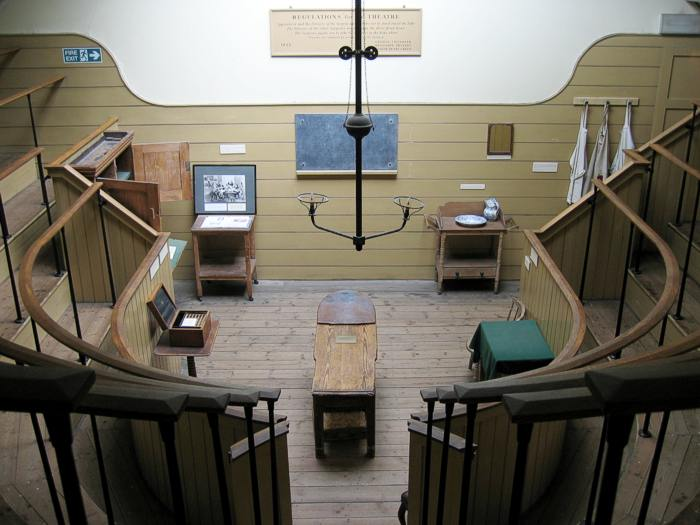
- The interior of the old operating theatre
- Established: 27 October 1962; 63 years ago
- Location: 9a St Thomas Street; London, SE1; United Kingdom
- Coordinates: 51°30′18″N 0°05′19″W
- Type: Medical museum
- Director: Dr. Sophie Waring
- Public transit access: London Bridge
- Website: oldoperatingtheatre.com

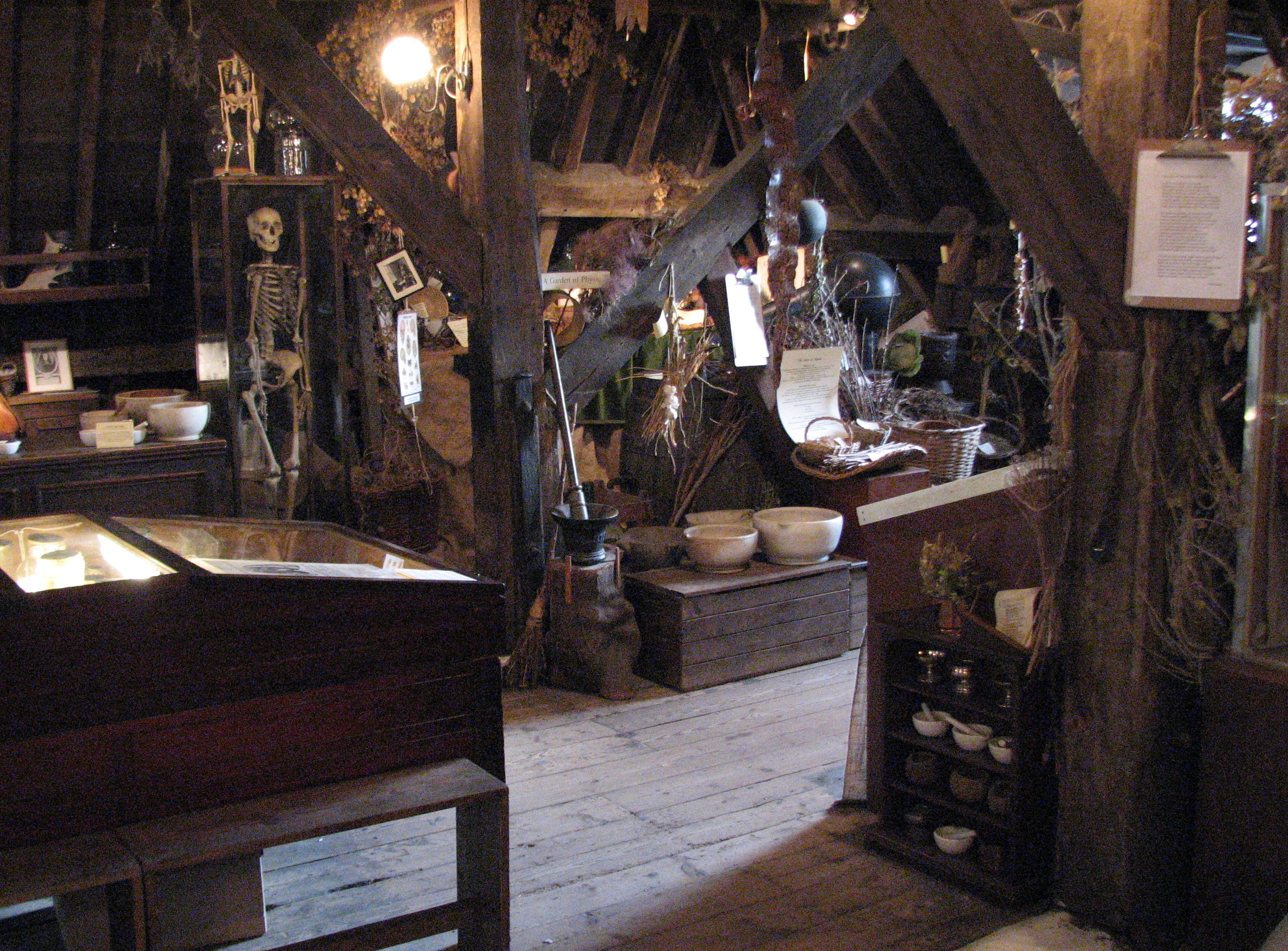
The herb garret

The Old Operating Theatre Museum and Herb Garret at 9a St Thomas Street is a museum of surgical history and one of the oldest surviving operating theatres. It is located in the garret of St Thomas's Church, Southwark, in London, on the original site of St Thomas' Hospital.

== History ==
There is little information about operating theatres at Old St Thomas from its foundation till the 18th century. The church that contains the Old Operating Theatre Museum was built at the end of the 17th century, when the hospital and church were largely rebuilt by Sir Robert Clayton, president of the hospital and a former Lord Mayor of the City of London. He employed Thomas Cartwright, master mason to Christopher Wren at St Mary-Le-Bow, as architect. The new church was fitted out with a large garret constructed in the 'aisled-barn' tradition. There is very little information about the garret except that it was fitted with wooden storage racks, and was described as "the herb garret" in 1821. Dried heads of opium plants were found in the rafters. It is likely that the garret was used by the hospital's resident apothecary to store and cure medicinal herbs.

In 1822 part of the herb garret was converted into a purpose-built operating theatre; previously operations had taken place on the ward. Windows were provided for the garret at the same time, suggesting that its function changed from storage to a working environment. This strange situation was due to the female surgical ward's abutting the garret, which may have been used as a recovery ward.

In 1859, Florence Nightingale became involved with St Thomas's, setting up on this site her famous nursing school. On her advice the hospital agreed to move to a new site when the Charing Cross Railway Company offered to buy the hospital's land. In 1862, the hospital began the move to its present site at Lambeth, and the operating theatre was closed, lying undiscovered until 1957.

=== Use ===
The patients were mainly poor people who were expected to contribute to their care if they could afford it. Rich patients were treated and operated on at home rather than in hospital. The patients at the old operating theatre were all women.

Until 1847, surgeons had no recourse to anaesthetics and depended on swift technique (surgeons could perform an amputation in a minute or less), the mental preparation of the patient, and alcohol or opiates to dull the patient's senses. Thereafter, ether or chloroform started to be used. The operating theatre had closed down before antiseptic surgery was developed. The majority of cases were for amputations or superficial complaints as, without antiseptic conditions, it was too dangerous to do internal operations.

A description of the students packing the theatre to witness an operation was left by a St Thomas surgeon, John Flint South:

The first two rows ... were occupied by the other dressers, and behind a second partition stood the pupils, packed like herrings in a barrel, but not so quiet, as those behind them were continually pressing on those before and were continually struggling to relieve themselves of it, and had not infrequently to be got out exhausted. There was also a continual calling out of "Heads, Heads" to those about the table whose heads interfered with the sightseers.

Patients put up with the audience, to their distress, because they received medical treatment from some of the best surgeons in the land, which otherwise they could not afford. Wealthy patients of the surgeons would have been operated on, by choice, at home, probably on the kitchen table.

The risk of death at the hands of a surgeon was greatly increased by the lack of understanding of the causes of infection. Although cleanliness was a moral virtue, descriptions suggest that a surgeon was as likely to wash his hands after an operation as before. The old frock coats worn by surgeons during operations were, according to a contemporary, 'stiff and stinking with pus and blood'. Beneath the table was a sawdust box for collecting blood. The death rate was further heightened by the shock of the operation, and because operations took place as a last resort, patients tended to have few reserves of strength.

== Modern museum ==
In 1962, after 100 years of disuse, the garret and operating theatre were opened to the public as the current museum. The museum consists of:

- The oldest surviving operating theatre in the UK (dating from 1822), used in the days before anaesthetics and antiseptic surgery
- The herb garret used by the hospital's apothecary to store and cure herbs used in healing
- A collection of artefacts revealing the horrors of medicine before the age of science, including instruments for cupping, bleeding, trepanning, and childbirth
- Displays on medieval monastic health care; the history of St Thomas's, Guy's Hospital and Evelina Children's Hospital; Florence Nightingale and nursing; and medical and herbal medicine

The museum is a member of the London Museums of Health & Medicine.

The building is listed Grade II* on the National Heritage List for England.

A nearby London Underground and National Rail station is London Bridge.
