= St Thomas' Church, Southwark =

St Thomas' Church
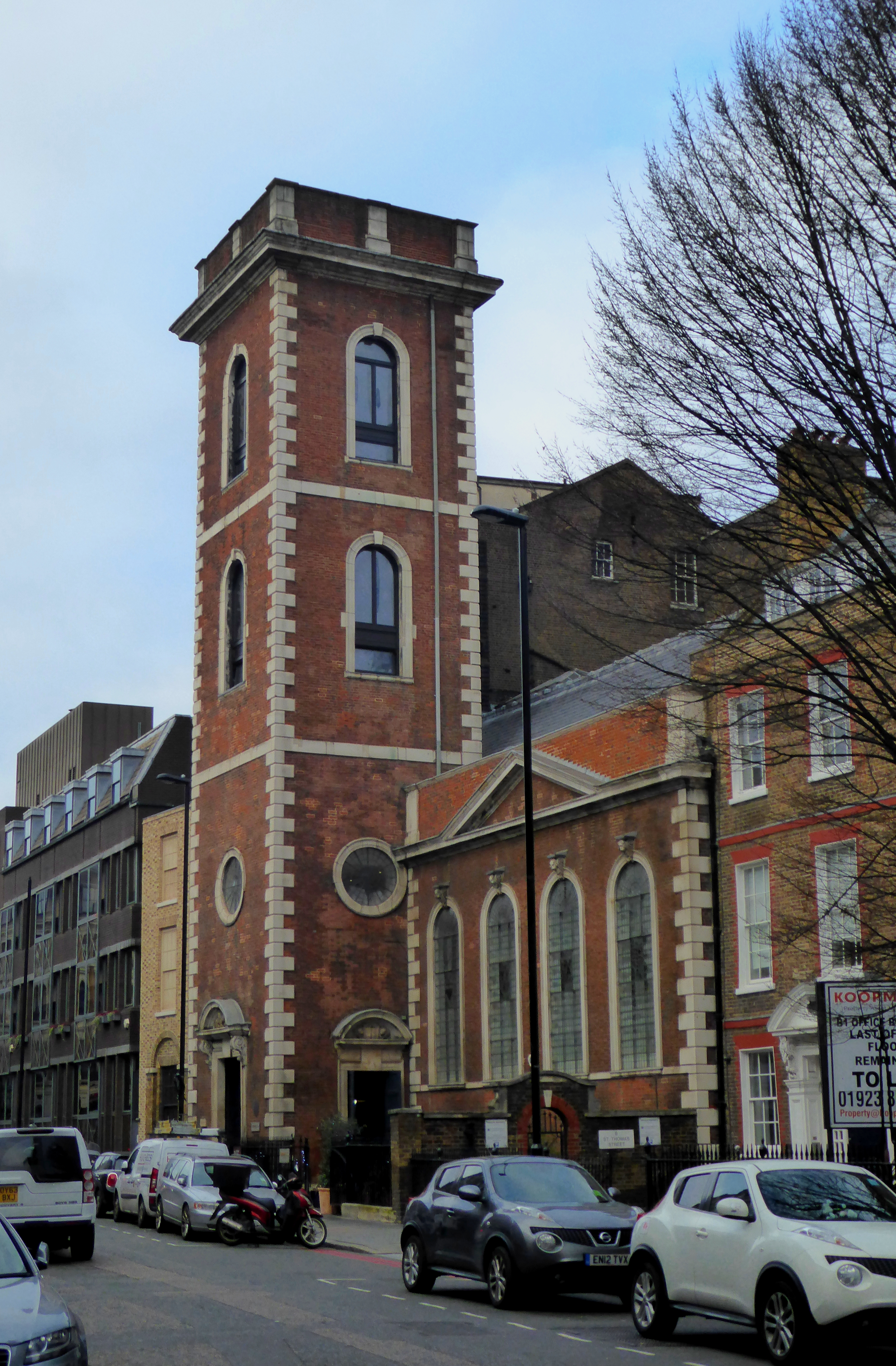
- St Thomas' Church
- 51°30′18″N 0°05′19″W
- Country: England
- Denomination: Church of England, earlier Roman Catholic

St Thomas Church, Southwark, London, England. The first church building was part of the original St. Thomas' Hospital which was located to the area around the present St Thomas Street, from the infirmary at St Mary Overie priory in 1212. The hospital was therefore also an Augustinian house. The hospital/conventual precinct became a parish no later than 1496. It was named after Thomas Becket. The church was renamed after Thomas the Apostle at the time of the reformation.

The present church was built by the hospital governors to designs by Thomas Cartwright in 1703. It had a garret that was called the Herb Garret in 1821. In the same year, the Old Operating Theatre was built in the Herb Garret.

Its use as a church became redundant in 1899 and the parish merged with St Saviour's, which became Southwark Cathedral in 1905; St Thomas' then was used as the Chapter House for the cathedral.

In the late 20th century it was used as office space by the Chapter Group, an insurance company. The building was undermined by the Jubilee Line Extension workings and was 'at risk' but repairs were effected from 2010 it became the HQ of the Cathedral Group property development company.

The church also houses the oldest surviving operating theatre in England. The scientific facility was uncovered in 1957 by Raymond Russell, and is situated in the garret (roof section) of the church.
