= St Thomas' Hospital =

Coordinates: 51.49910°N 0.11891°W

- Guy's and St Thomas' NHS Foundation Trust
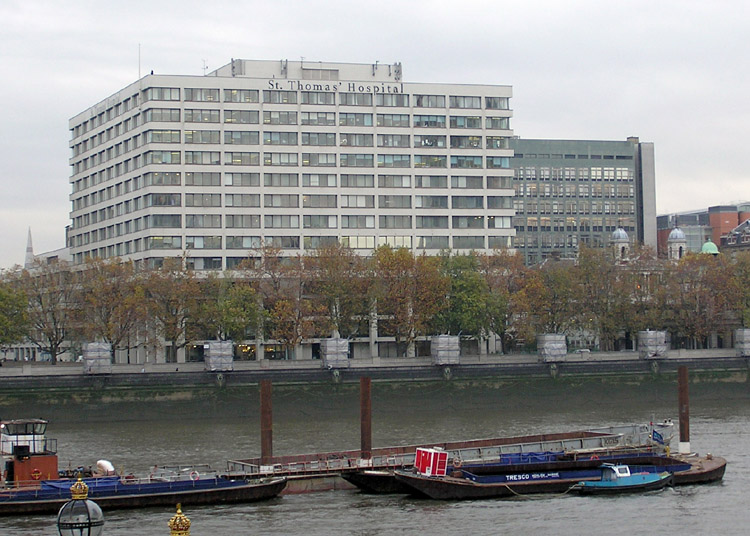
- St Thomas' Hospital, located across the River Thames from the Houses of Parliament

Geography
- Location: Westminster Bridge Road, Lambeth, Greater London, England

Organisation
- Care system: National Health Service
- Type: Teaching
- Affiliated university: King's College London GKT School of Medical Education

Services
- Emergency department: Yes
- Beds: 840

History
- Founded: circa 1100

Links
- Website: www.guysandstthomas.nhs.uk/st-thomas-hospital

St Thomas' Hospital is a large NHS teaching hospital in Lambeth, Central London, England. It is administratively part of the Guy's and St Thomas' NHS Foundation Trust, together with Guy's Hospital, Evelina London Children's Hospital, Royal Brompton Hospital and other sites. It is also a member of King's Health Partners, an academic health science centre, and is one of three sites used by King's College London GKT School of Medical Education.

The hospital was established in the Middle Ages and named for St Thomas Becket. Originally located in Southwark, but based in Lambeth since 1871, the hospital has provided healthcare freely or under charitable auspices since the 12th century. It is one of London's most famous hospitals, associated with people such as Sir Astley Cooper, William Cheselden, Florence Nightingale, Alicia Lloyd Still, Linda Richards, Edmund Montgomery, Agnes Elizabeth Jones and Sir Harold Ridley. It is a prominent London landmark – largely due to its location on the opposite bank of the River Thames to the Houses of Parliament.

St Thomas' Hospital is accessible from Westminster tube station, Waterloo station, and Lambeth North tube station.

== History ==
=== The Hospital at The Borough, Southwark ===
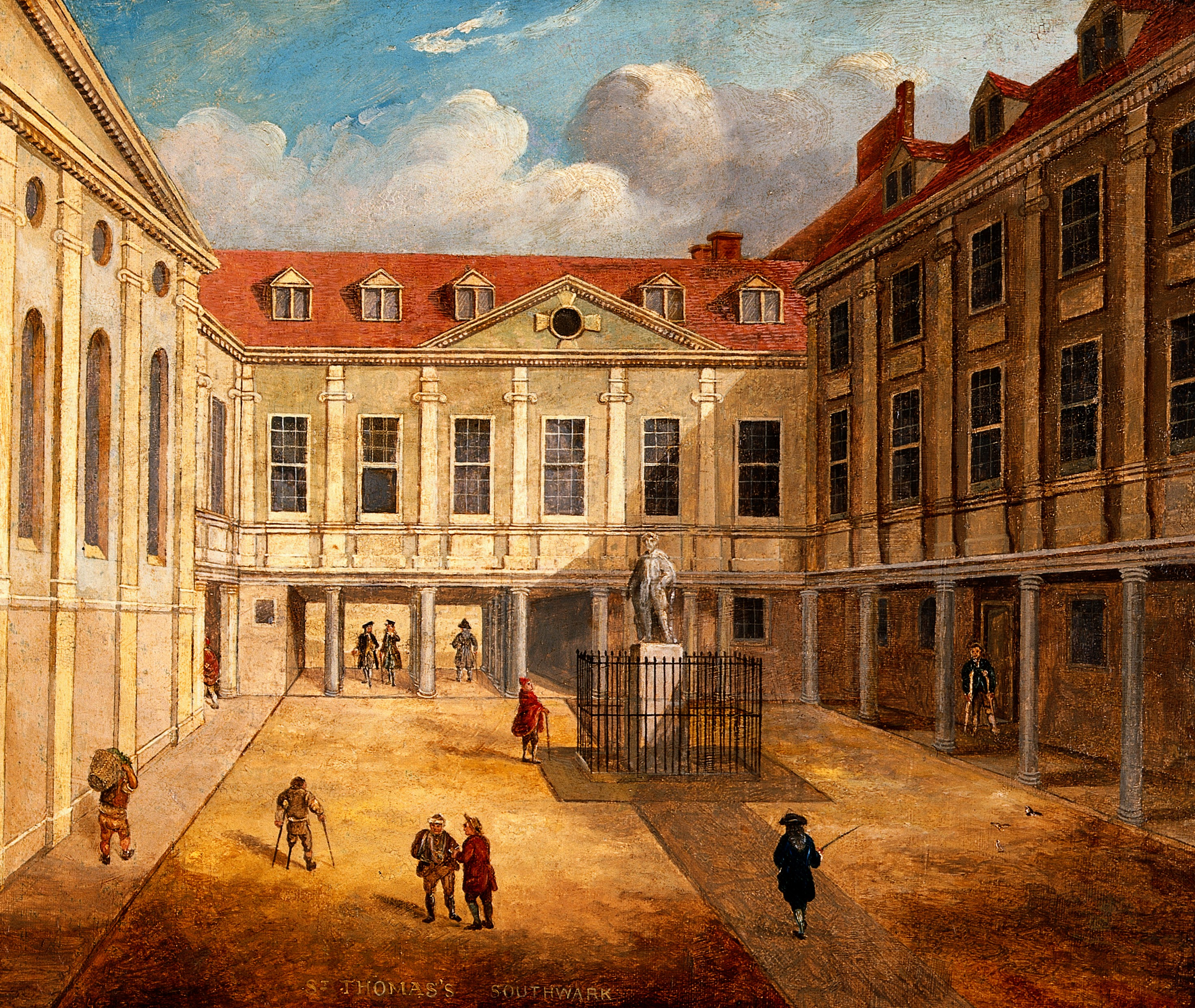
An oil painting of St Thomas' Hospital in Southwark, south London

The hospital was described as ancient in 1215 and was named after St Thomas Becket – which suggests it may have been founded after 1173 when Becket was canonised. This date was when it was relocated from the precinct of St Mary Overie Priory to "Trenet Lane", then later to St Thomas Street. However, it is possible it was only renamed in 1173 and that there was an infirmary at the priory when it was founded at Southwark in 1106.

Originally the hospital was run by a mixed order of Augustinian canons regular and canonesses regular, dedicated to St Thomas Becket, and provided shelter and treatment for the poor, sick, and homeless. In the 15th century, Richard Whittington endowed a lying-in ward for unmarried mothers. The monastery was dissolved in 1539 during the Reformation and the hospital closed but reopened in 1551 and rededicated to Thomas the Apostle. This was due to the efforts of the City of London who obtained the grant of the site and a charter of 1553 from Edward VI (26 June, 7 Edw. VI) establishing three institutions Bridewell Hospital, Christ's Hospital and St Thomas' Hospital. The hospital has remained open ever since.

The hospital was also where one of the first printed English Bibles was produced in 1537, and this is commemorated by a plaque on the surviving wing in Borough High Street. The plaque inaccurately refers to "the first printed Bible in English" rather than "one of the first".

There were some twenty-four priors, masters, wardens or rectors who served between the foundation of the hospital and the Dissolution of the Monasteries in 1539.

Dr. Eleazar Hodson was the first St Thomas' physician about whom the medical historian Joseph Frank Payne was able to find any precise information. Hodson received his medical degree at Padua in 1612 and became F.R.C.P. in 1618. At the end of the 17th century, the hospital and church were largely rebuilt by Sir Robert Clayton, president of the hospital and a former Lord Mayor of London. Thomas Cartwright was the architect for the work. A statue of Clayton now stands at the north entrance to Ward Block of North Wing at St Thomas' Hospital and is Grade I listed. In 1721 Sir Thomas Guy, a governor of St Thomas', founded Guy's Hospital as a place to treat 'incurables' discharged from St Thomas'.

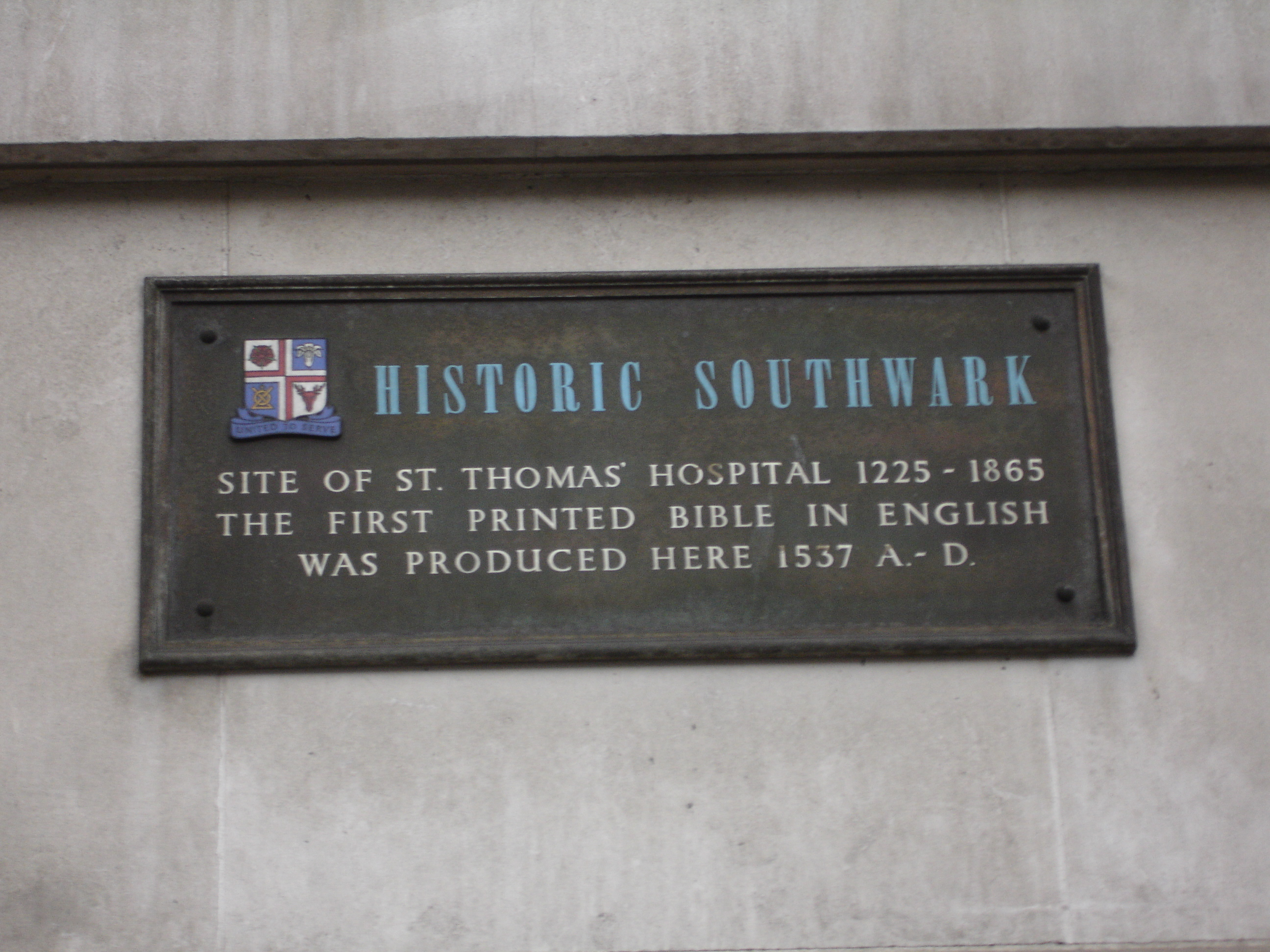
The site of St Thomas' Hospital in Southwark 'where the first English Bible was printed'. The plaque is misleading because the first such English Bible, the Coverdale Bible, was printed in Antwerp in 1535.

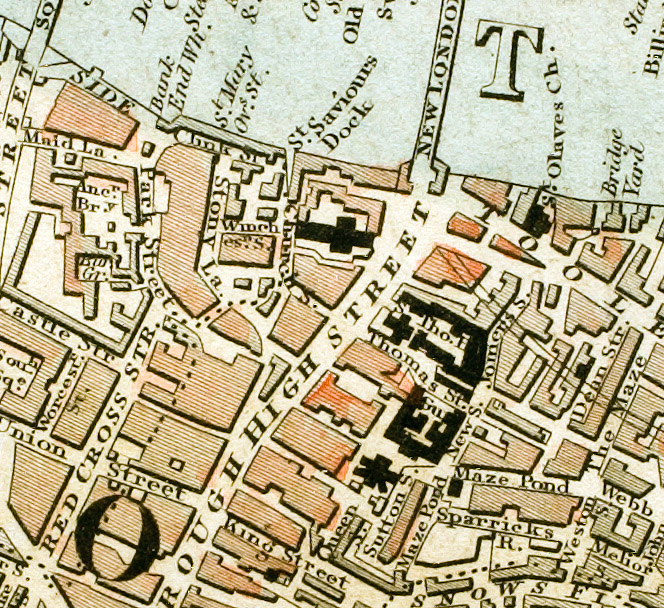
The location of Guy's and St Thomas' hospitals c. 1833

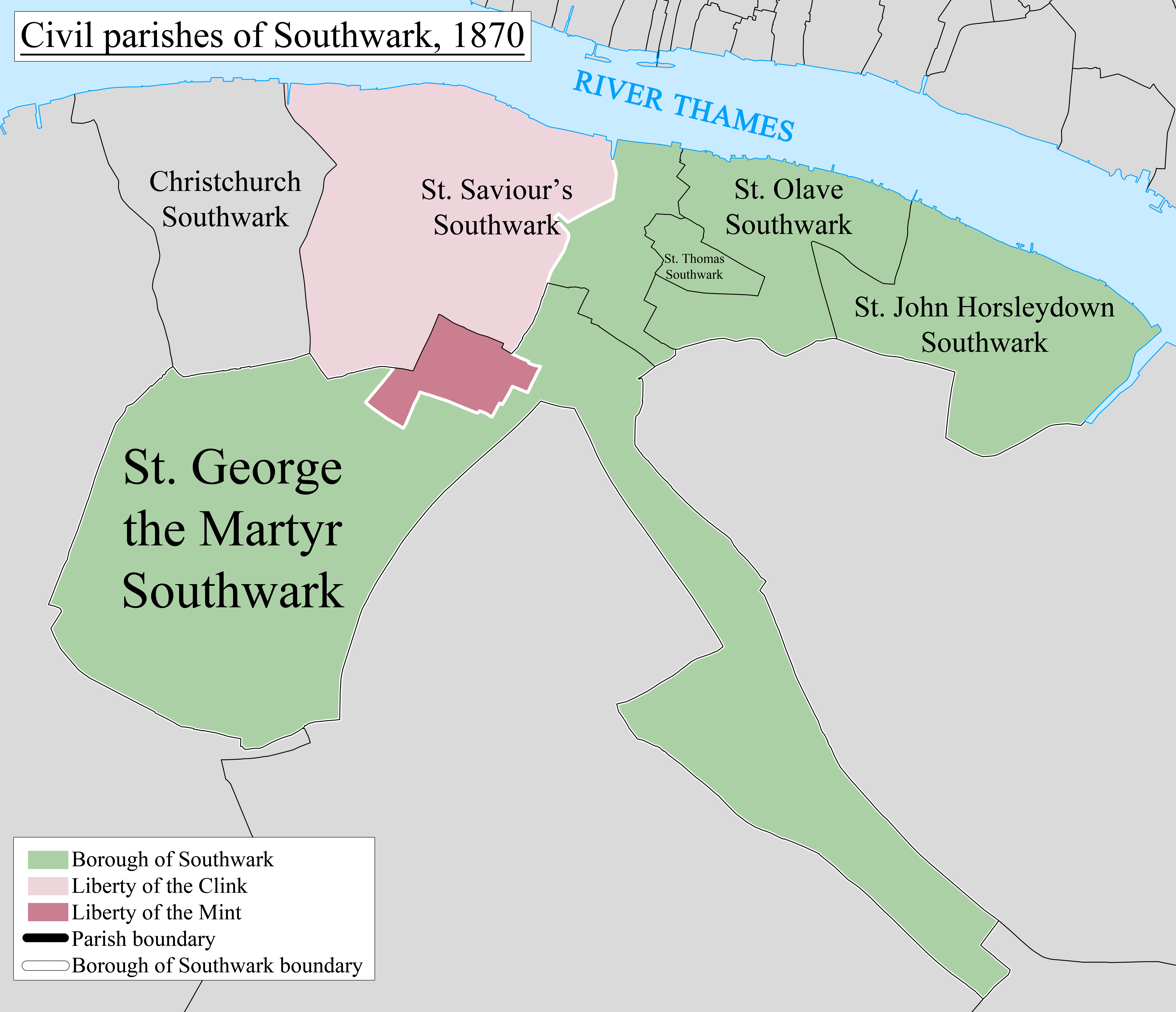
A map showing the parish of St. Thomas within Southwark

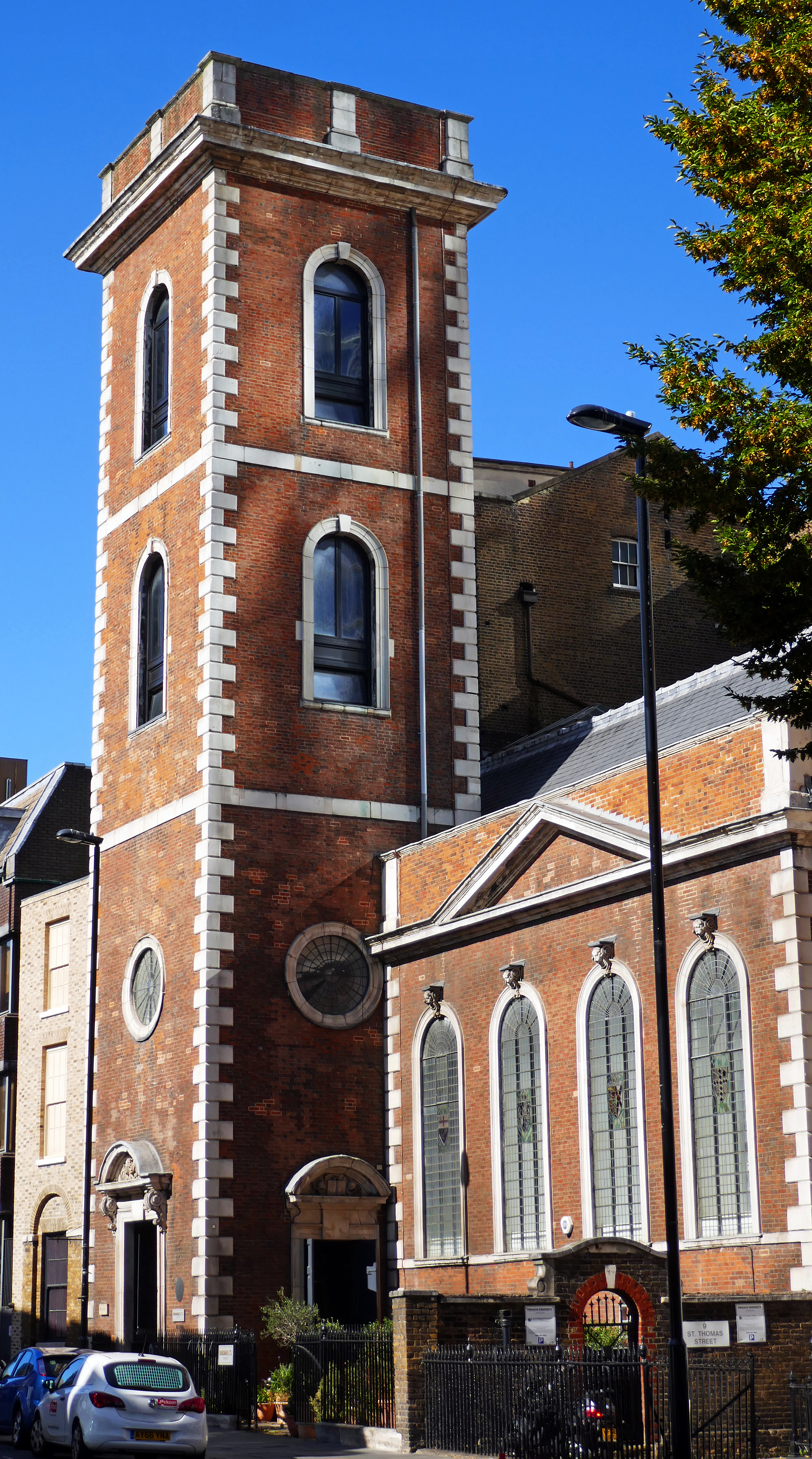
The old St Thomas's Church, a long-deconsecrated space built in the 1690s, containing the Old Operating Theatre Museum and Herb Garret.

Saint Thomas's Hospital Act 1862
- Act of Parliament
- Parliament of the United Kingdom
- Long title: An Act to enable the Mayor and Commonalty and Citizens of the City of London, Governors of the Possessions, Revenues, and Goods of the Hospital of Edward, late King of England the Sixth, of Saint Thomas the Apostle, commonly called "Saint Thomas's Hospital", to convey the Site of the present Hospital to the Charing Cross Railway Company, and to acquire a new Site for the same Hospital; and for other Purposes.
- Citation: 25 & 26 Vict. c. 4

Dates
- Royal assent: 7 August 1862

Text of statute as originally enacted

Some parts of the old St Thomas' Hospital survive on the north side of St Thomas Street, Southwark including the old St. Thomas' Church, now used mostly as offices but including the Old Operating Theatre, which is now a museum. However the hospital left Southwark in 1862, when its ancient site was compulsorily purchased to make way for the construction of the Charing Cross railway viaduct from London Bridge Station. The hospital was temporarily housed at Royal Surrey Gardens in Newington (Walworth) until new buildings on the present site in Lambeth near Lambeth Palace were completed in 1871.

=== The Victorian hospital in Lambeth ===
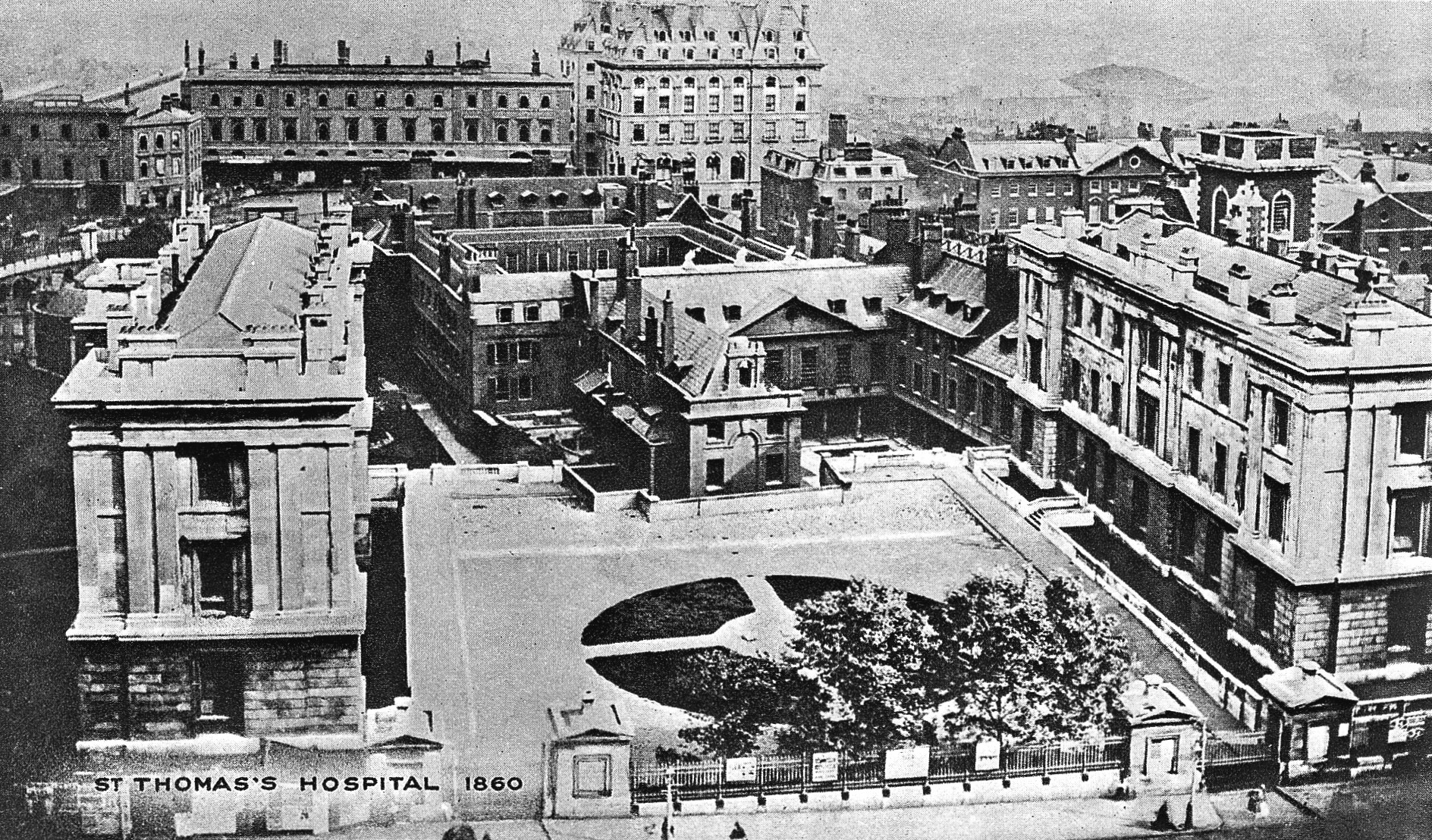
St Thomas' Hospital 1860, aerial view

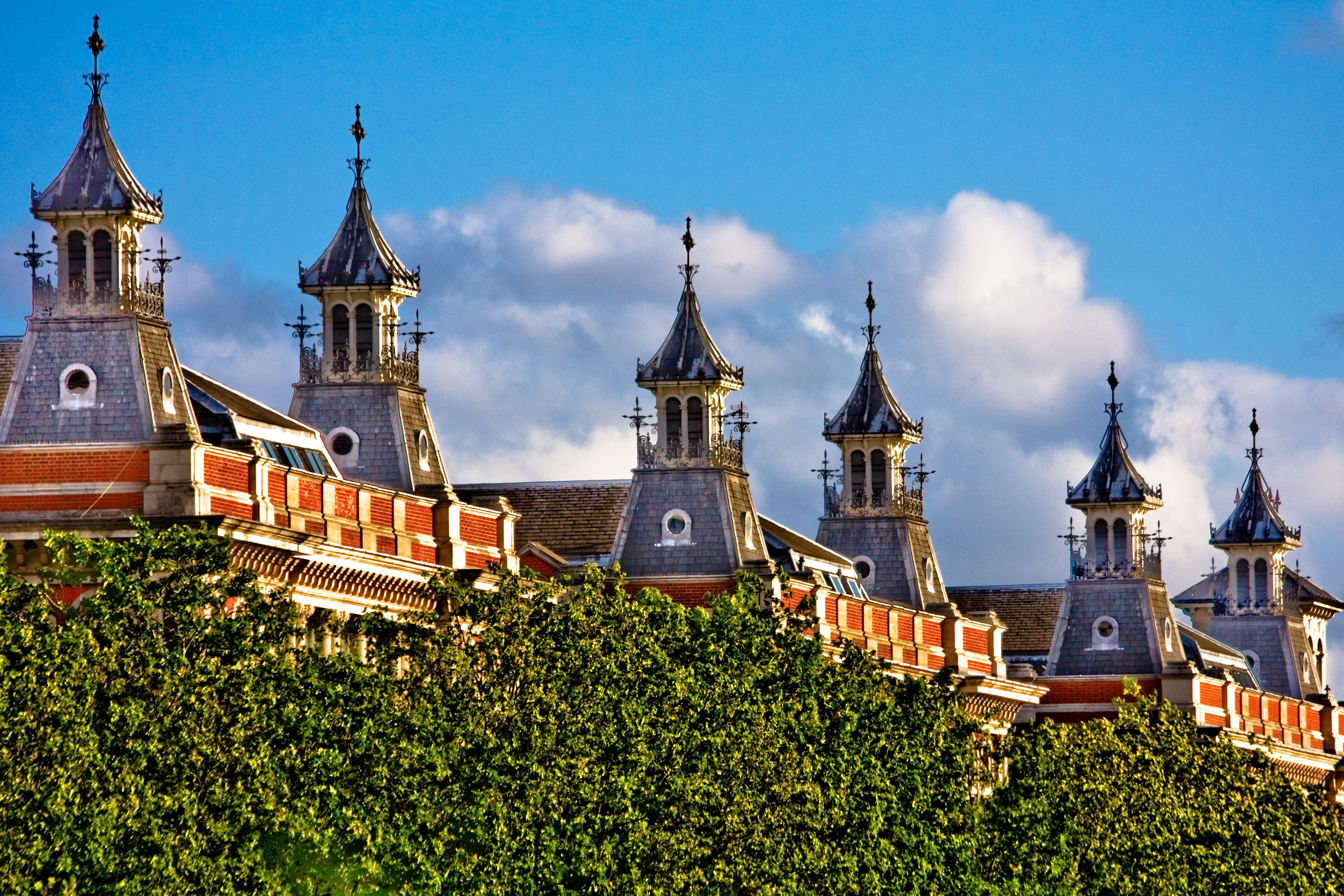
Surviving pavilions of the 1868 building

The present-day St Thomas' Hospital is located at a site historically known as Stangate in the London Borough of Lambeth. It is directly across the River Thames from the Palace of Westminster on a plot of land largely reclaimed from the river during construction of the Albert Embankment in the late 1860s. The new buildings were designed by Henry Currey and the foundation stone was laid by Queen Victoria in 1868. There was a seventh pavilion at the north end of the site next to Westminster Bridge Road for the "Treasurer's House" (hospital offices). The hospital initially had 600 beds.

This was one of the first new hospitals to adopt the "pavilion principle" – popularised by Florence Nightingale in her Notes on Hospitals – by having six separate ward buildings at right angles to the river frontage set 125 feet apart and linked by low corridors. The intention was primarily to improve ventilation and to separate and segregate patients with infectious diseases.

"St. Thomas's Home" was established in one of the end blocks of the hospital in the early 1880s "for persons of both sexes of the middle and upper classes willing to pay for medical attendance and nursing therein, at the rate of not less than 8s. a day, paid weekly in advance".

In 1901 and 1903 two children's wards, named Lilian and Seymour, opened; they were decorated with Doulton fairy tale and nursery rhyme tiles. The 25 Lilian tiles panels, measuring approximately 5 by 2 feet (152 cm × 61 cm), were designed by William Rowe and the Seymour tiles were designed by Rowe and Margaret Thompson. The Queen who visited the hospital in 1914 declared them to be "a splendid idea" and a visiting American nurse also praised them for providing pleasure for sick children. When the Seymour Ward was demolished most of the tiles were lost but some were resited in the new hospital; when the Lilian Ward closed in the 1970s a Doulton Tile Fund and the hospital trustees bore the cost of restoring and framing the tiles for display in the new hospital.

An urban legend suggests that by convention, deaths in the Palace of Westminster are recorded as occurring in St Thomas' Hospital, because it is technically a royal palace, and as such people who die there would be entitled to a state funeral. This is not true, since state funerals for any person other than a sovereign require an order from the reigning monarch as well as a parliamentary vote to authorise the funding.

A similar myth suggests that the place of death is changed because a death in a royal palace would require an inquest from the Coroner of the Queen's Household and a hearing before a jury of members of the Royal Household. Although the position of Coroner of the Queen's Household was abolished by the Coroners and Justice Act 2009, in the past the Coroner was responsible for inquests where the victim was "lying within the limits of the Queen's palaces", which would have included the Palace of Westminster. However, there is no proof that deaths at Westminster were ever reported as happening at St Thomas' Hospital to avoid involving the Coroner. When Sir Alfred Billson died in the House of Commons in 1907, his death was recorded as occurring in the House and not at St Thomas' Hospital.

The hospital was requisitioned by the War Office in 1914 to create the 5th London General Hospital, a facility for the Royal Army Medical Corps to treat military casualties.

=== Post-war rebuilding ===
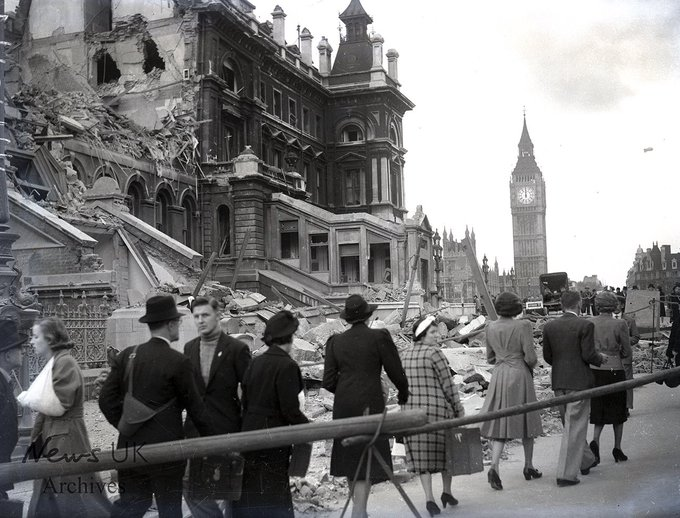
St Thomas Hospital, London, the night after an air raid. Courtesy of News UK Archive.

The northern part of the hospital site was severely damaged during the Second World War, with three ward blocks destroyed. Limited reconstruction began in the 1950s including the building now known as East Wing. Complete rebuilding to a more ambitious plan to designs by Yorke Rosenberg Mardall was agreed on in the 1960s requiring the realignment of Lambeth Palace Road further away from the river to enlarge the hospital campus. The new buildings have white-tiled cladding, which was a characteristic of several other university and hospital buildings designed by that practice.

As construction of the thirteen storey block (now North Wing) was completed by John Laing & Sons in 1975 there was a widespread public reaction against the scale and appearance of this building – most notably from MPs who could see it from the river terrace of the Palace of Westminster. The southern part of the redevelopment, which would have included a second tall block, was never constructed. The three remaining Victorian ward pavilion blocks were refurbished in the 1980s. They are now Grade II listed buildings.

In November 1949, in an operating theatre in St Thomas' Hospital, Harold Ridley achieved the world's first implantation of an intraocular lens (IOL), treating a cataract in a 49-year-old female patient. In later life Ridley himself underwent successful bilateral intraocular lens implantation at St Thomas's. What was most pleasing to him was that he had the operation done in the same hospital where he had performed the first operation in 1949. Ridley was subsequently made a Knight Bachelor "for pioneering services to cataracts surgery".

With the closure of the Dreadnought Seamen's Hospital at the Greenwich Hospital in 1986, services for seamen and their families are provided by the Dreadnought Unit at St Thomas' Hospital. It allows eligible merchant seafarers access to priority medical treatment, except cardiac surgery, and is funded by central government with money separate from other NHS trust funds. It originally consisted of two 28-bed wards, but nowadays Dreadnought patients are treated according to clinical need and so are placed in the ward most suitable for their medical condition.

Following the merger of Guy's and St Thomas' Hospitals into one trust, accident and emergency services were consolidated at St Thomas' Hospital in 1993. Former prime minister Harold Wilson died at the hospital on 24 May 1995, as a result of cancer and Alzheimer's disease. In the late 1980s Dr Chris Aps introduced changes at St Thomas' Hospital which allowed cardiothoracic surgical patients to recover away from the intensive care unit in an overnight intensive recovery unit: this has become a template for similar units across the United Kingdom. In October 2005 children's departments moved to new facilities designed by Michael Hopkins at Evelina London Children's Hospital to the south-east of St Thomas' Hospital.

=== Response to COVID-19 ===
As the situation in Wuhan deteriorated, at the end of January 2020, four hospital trusts in the UK, including St Thomas' and The Royal Free were put on standby to receive suspected patients.

After testing positive to COVID-19 on 27 March, Prime Minister Boris Johnson was admitted to St Thomas' on 5 April and as his condition deteriorated, he was moved to intensive care later that day. He was moved out of intensive care on 9 April and discharged 3 days later.

== Facilities ==
The current main pedestrian entrance is in Westminster Bridge Road, although there is a separate vehicle and A&E entrance in Lambeth Palace Road; there is also a riverside pedestrian entrance, and the Lane Fox Unit (chronic respiratory problems) has its own riverside entrance, mainly for the use of patients on the Lane Fox Ward. The pedestrian entrance to the campus leads to a glazed link between the Lambeth Wing and the North Wing. Guy's and St Thomas' Charity commissioned sculptor Rick Kirby to produce a sculpture "Cross the Divide", and this was unveiled in 2000 outside the Main Entrance. To the north of the North Wing (closer to Westminster Bridge Road) there is a garden area above car parking with Naum Gabo's fountain sculpture Revolving Torsion at its centre.

Tommy's is a UK-based charity that funds research into pregnancy problems and provides information to parents. The charity believes that it is unacceptable that one in four women in the UK will lose a baby during pregnancy and birth. It started when two obstetricians working in the maternity unit at the hospital were inspired to start fundraising for more research into pregnancy problems. It funds three research centres in the UK, including St Thomas' in London, Saint Mary's Hospital, Manchester, and the recently established Royal Infirmary of Edinburgh.

== Name ==
The use of the plural genitive s' in place of the singular genitive s's is fairly recent. The hospital newsletter in 2004 claimed that plural s' is grammatically correct, as "there are two men called St Thomas linked to the hospital's history: Thomas Becket and Thomas the Apostle". A hospital belonging to two men, both called Thomas, would be Thomases', so the name change in the late 20th century is considered by some to be a simple mistake.

Within the South Wing of the hospital there are a number of late Victorian brass plaques headed "St Thomas's Hospital" i.e. using singular genitive. The medical school uses the singular genitive s's; the explanation given for this was that, as the medical school of the hospital, it was called "St Thomas's Hospital Medical School".

== Medical training at St Thomas' Hospital ==
St Thomas's Hospital Medical School was established in 1550. Following the establishment of Guy's Hospital as a separate institution, this continued as a single medical school, commonly known as The Borough Hospitals, with teaching across St Thomas' and Guy's Hospitals. Following a dispute over the successor to the Surgeon Astley Cooper, Guy's established its own separate medical school in 1825.

The medical school subsequently remerged in 1982 with that at Guy's to form the United Medical and Dental Schools of Guy's and St Thomas' Hospitals (UMDS). Subsequent additions included the Royal Dental Hospital of London School of Dental Surgery joining with Guy's Dental School on 1 August 1983 and St John's Institute of Dermatology on 1 August 1985. The latter had previously been located at 5 Lisle Street in Soho.

Following discussion held between 1990 and 1992 with King's College London and the King's College London Act 1997, the UMDS merged in 1998 with King's College School of Medicine and Dentistry to form as The Guy's, Kings & Thomas' Schools of Medicine (GKT School of Medicine), of Dentistry and of Biomedical Sciences. This was renamed as King's College London School of Medicine and Dentistry at Guy's, King's and St Thomas' Hospitals in 2005.

== Nurse training at St Thomas' Hospital ==
The Nightingale Training School and Home for Nurses opened at St Thomas' Hospital on 9 July 1860 under Matron Sarah Elizabeth Wardroper, endowed from the publicly donated Fund raised after the Crimean War to honour Florence Nightingale. Alicia LLoyd Still (matron of the hospital and superintendent of the training school from 1913 to 1937) created the first post of sister tutor, setting a model internationally.

Notable alumni of the training school included: Dorothy Coode, assistant matron (1924–1933) and president of the Royal College of Nursing (1935–37); Lucy Duff Grant, matron of the Manchester Royal Infirmary (1929 to 1955) and president of the Royal College of Nursing (1951 to 1953); Dorothy Bannon, (Chief Matron-in-Charge of the Hospital and School Nursing Service of the London County Council from 1929 to 1940); Ruth Darbyshire Matron University College Hospital London (1922–1935) Matron-in-Chief of the British Red Cross and Order of St. John of Jerusalem (March 1940 – September 1943), Dame Barbara Cozens (Matron-in-Chief and Director of Army Nursing Services from 1960 to 1964), and Theodora Turner (Matron at St. Thomas' 1955 to 1965 and President of the Royal College of Nursing 1966 to 1968).

The school merged with other training schools in the 1990s, then became the Florence Nightingale Faculty of Nursing, Midwifery & Palliative Care, part of King's College London.

== Notable alumni ==
- Dame Sarah Mullaly, first female Archbishop of Canterbury worked as a nurse at the hospital.

== Arms ==
Coat of arms of St Thomas' Hospital
Notes Granted 14 February 1950. Prior to the formal granting of these arms in 1950 the hospital used a similar but simpler version. The cross and sword refer to the city of London. In the chief the blue colour and the fleur-de-lys reference the royal arms of Edward VI. The nightingale supporter references Florence Nightingale and is a symbol for a hospital. The two choughs, one a supporter and the other on the escutcheon are popularly known as the Becket bird and represent Thomas Becket after whom the original hospital was named. The spears in the crest represents Thomas the Apostle, who was speared to death. Crest On a wreath of the colours, Between four spears, points upwards, sable, embrued gules, three Madonna lilies argent, stalked and leaved vert. Escutcheon Argent, on a cross between in the first quarter a sword erect gules and in the second quarter a chough proper, a roach haurient of the first; on a chief azure a rose of the field, barbed and seeded proper, between two fleurs-de-lys Or. Supporters On the dexter side a chough, and on the sinister side a nightingale, both proper.

== In popular culture ==
- In the 1975 crime film Brannigan, interior shots in an office set with a Thames river view constructed on an upper floor in the north-east corner of the (built but not yet commissioned) North Wing stood in for "Scotland Yard" in scenes between John Wayne (Chicago police detective Brannigan) and Richard Attenborough (Metropolitan Police Commander Swann).
- Graham Swift's 1996 novel Last Orders features several scenes from the hospital where one of the main characters, Jack Dodds, dies from cancer.
- The main building was used as the exterior shot of the fictional Royal Hope Hospital featured in the Doctor Who episode "Smith and Jones".
- The hospital also featured in the 2002 film 28 Days Later in which the hospital was abandoned due to the nationwide outbreak of a deadly virus which causes its victims to go insane.
- Novelist Lucilla Andrews trained as a nurse at St Thomas' during the Second World War, and her experiences there are recounted in her autobiography No Time for Romance as well as being the basis for a series of wartime romances set in a fictional hospital inspired by St Thomas'.
- The Kinks' song "Waterloo Sunset" was inspired in part by songwriter Ray Davies' view over the Thames from St. Thomas while he was a patient there following a tracheotomy at age 13.

== Gallery ==
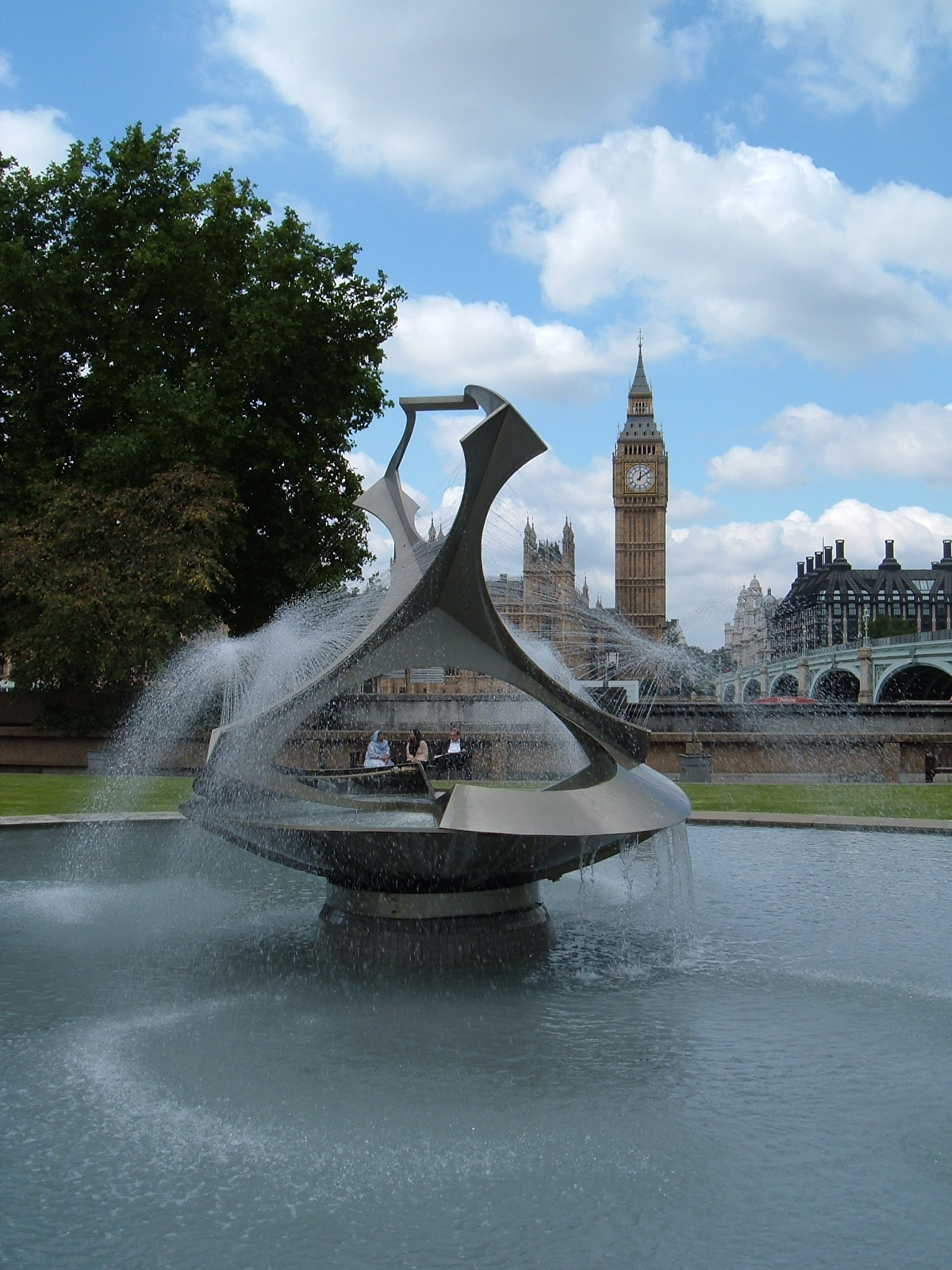
Revolving Torsion kinetic sculpture/fountain by Naum Gabo

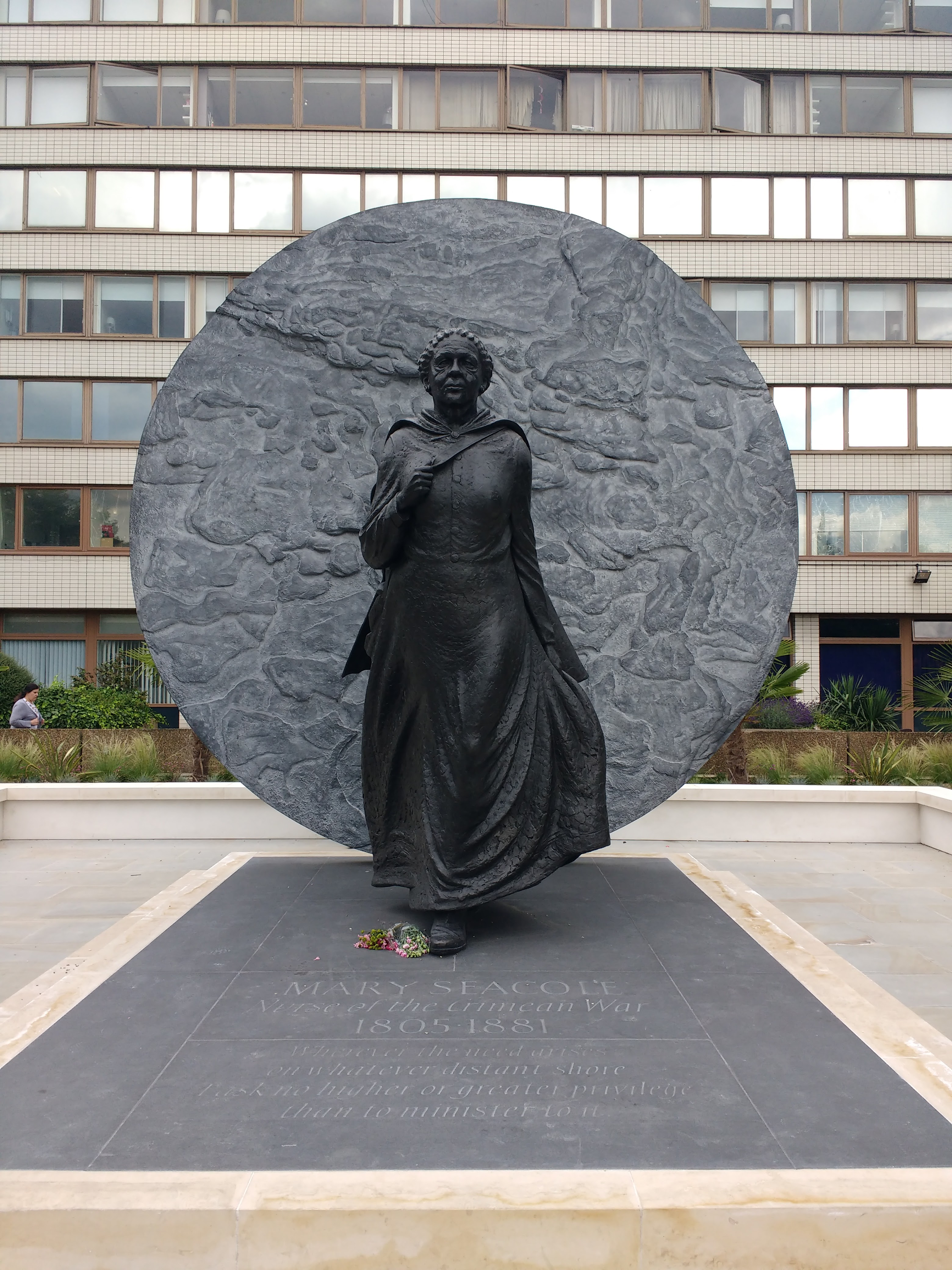
Statue of Mary Seacole at St Thomas' Hospital, by Martin Jennings

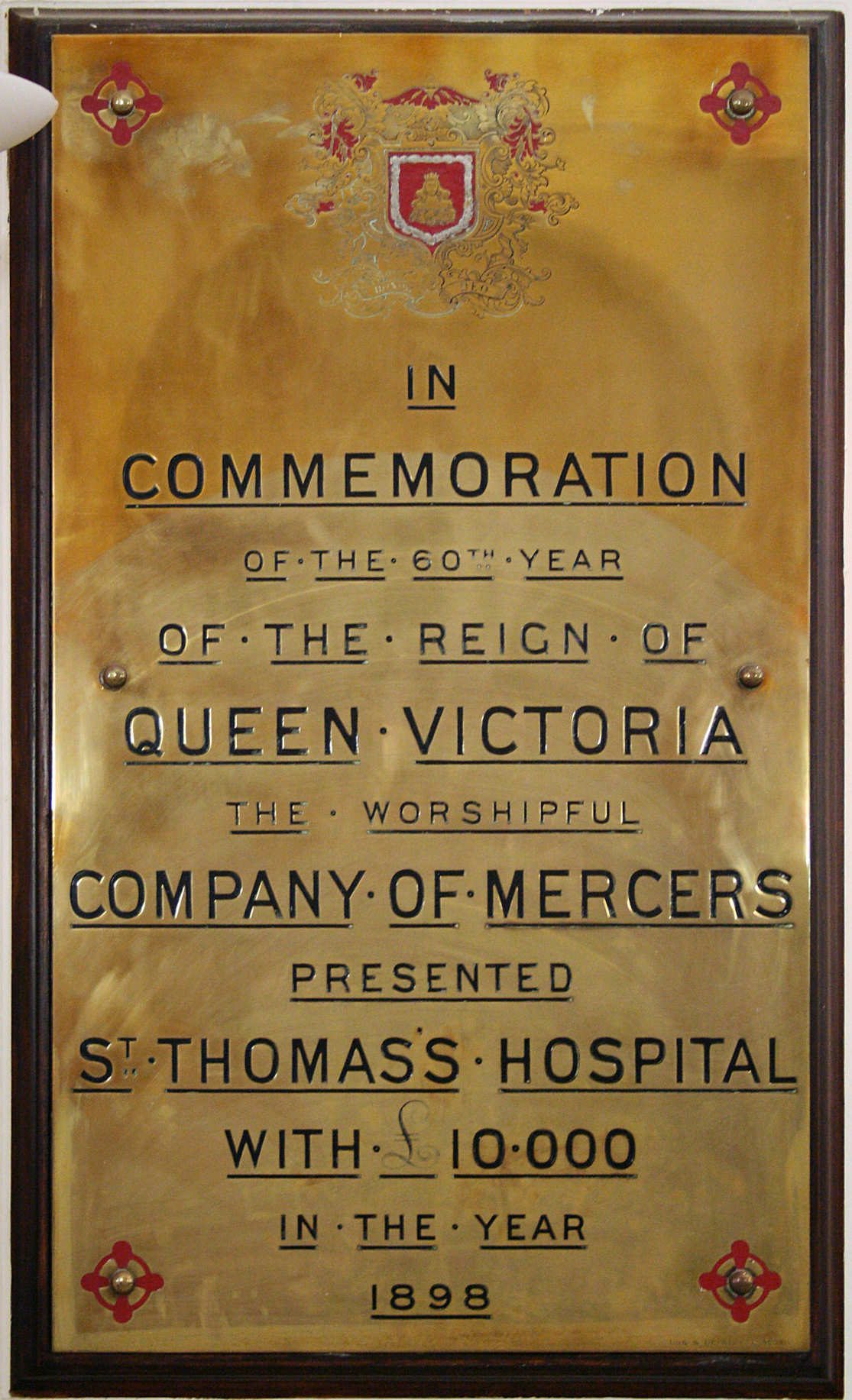
Plaque indicating name included singular genitive s's in the past

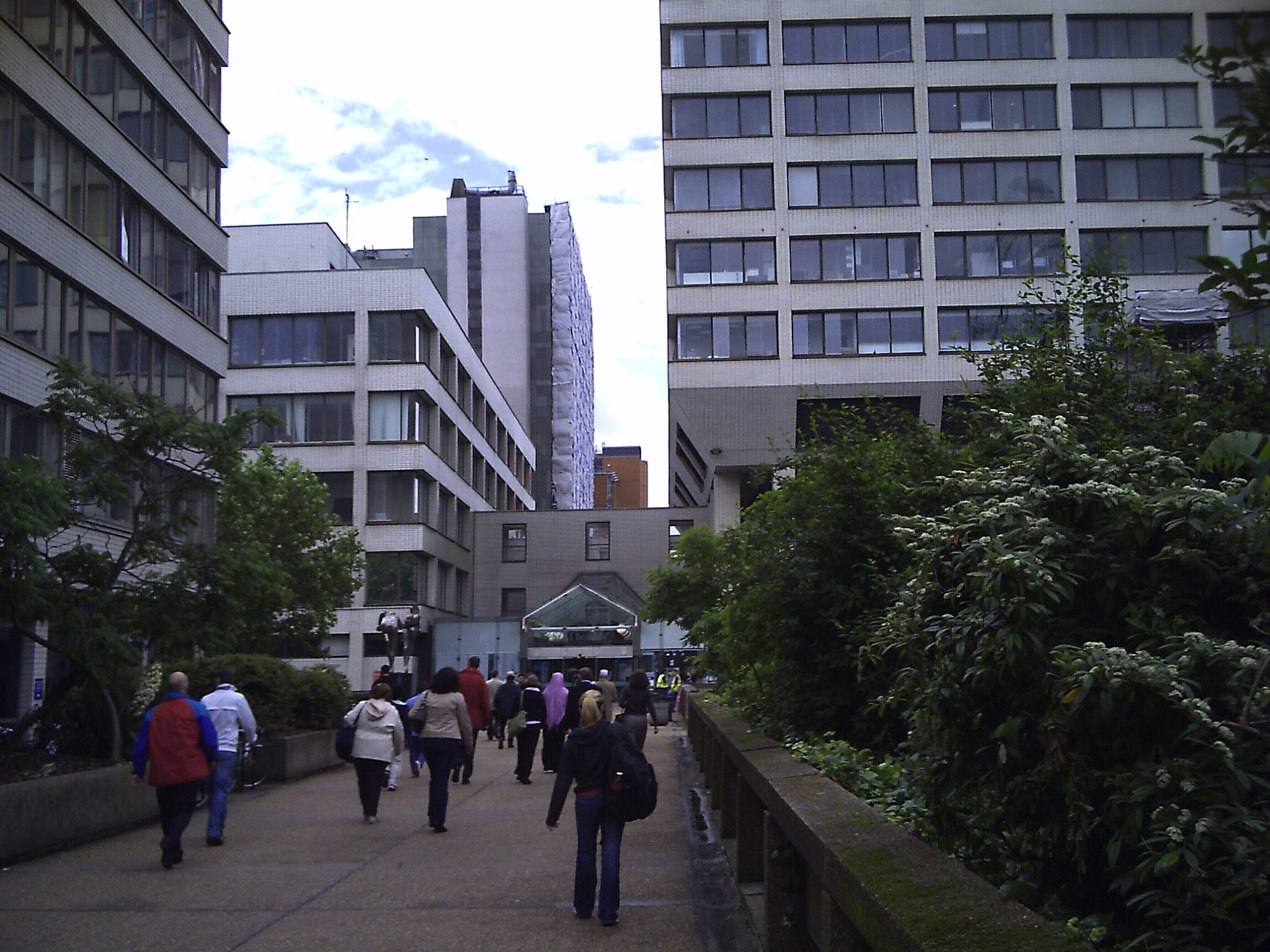
Main pedestrian entrance from Westminster Bridge Road

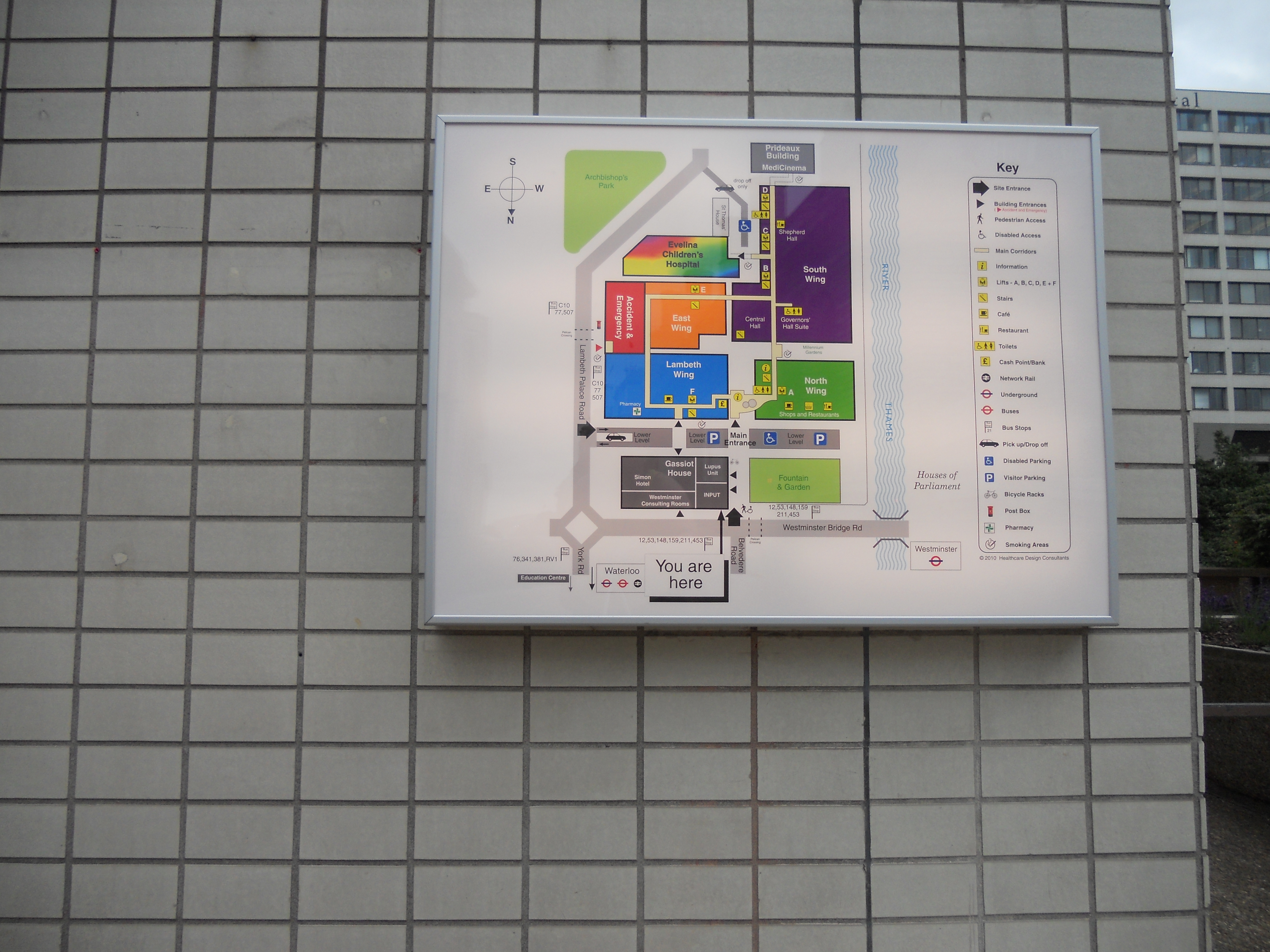
St Thomas' Hospital information sign

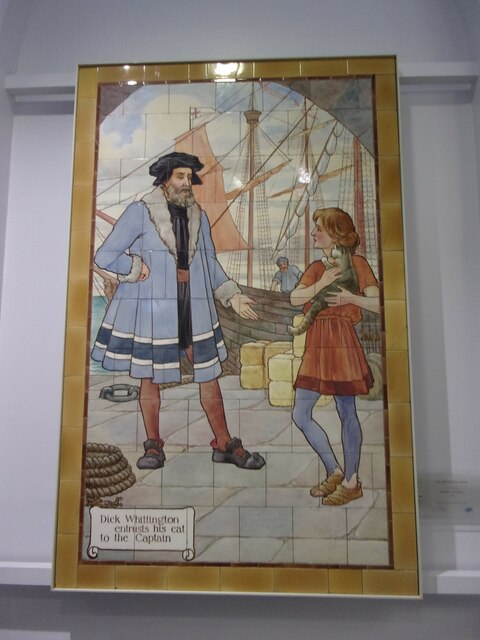
Doulton tile picture
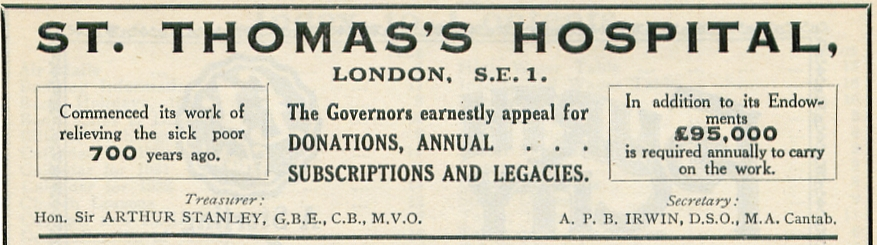
An appeal for funds made in 1931

== See also ==
- King's Health Partners
- Florence Nightingale Museum
- Lucy M. Hall (1843–1907), physician, writer; first woman ever received at its bedside clinics
