= Thomas Cartwright (stonemason) =

British architect

Thomas Cartwright (c. 1635 – 27 December 1703) was a 17th-century English stonemason, building contractor and sculptor.

Cartwright was born in Hertfordshire; his parents were Timothy Cartwright of Gloucestershire and Penelope Segar, whose first husband was Nicholas Charles.

Cartwright became a Liveryman of the Masons' Company and worked in London on numerous buildings in the aftermath of the Great Fire of London of 1666. He was a contractor for St Antholin, St Benet Fink, and St Mary le Bow, three of the Wren churches. He worked as a mason-contractor on the Royal Exchange, with sole charge after Edward Jerman died in 1668. He was employed by Sir Robert Clayton, president of St Thomas' Hospital, to rebuild the hospital and the nearby St Thomas' Church on St Thomas Street, SE1, on what is now the site of London Bridge railway station.
