= Naum Gabo =

Soviet sculptor (1890–1977)

Naum Gabo KBE
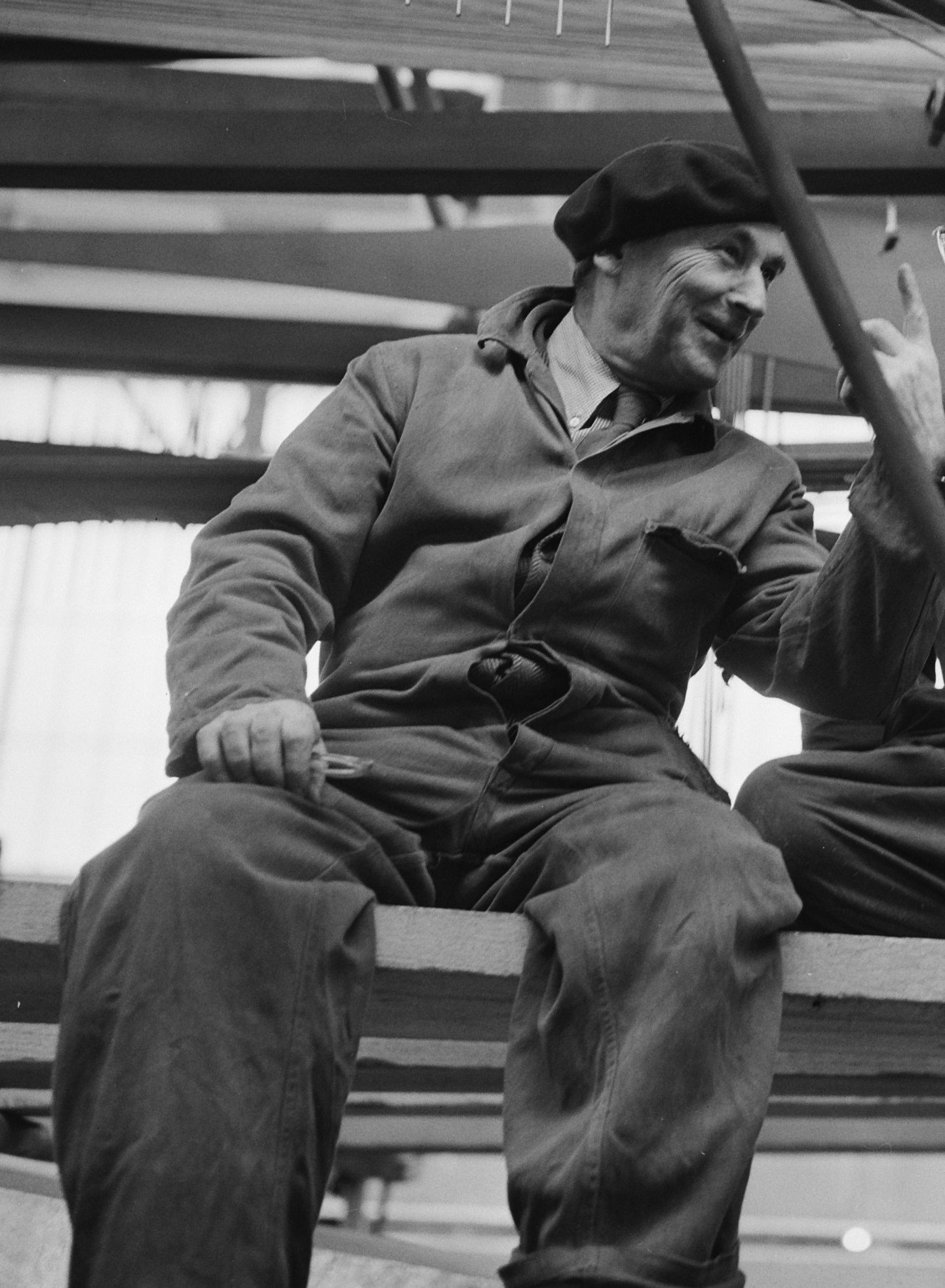
- Pictured in 1957
- Born: Naum Neemia Pevsner; Officially 5 August 1890, though actual date unclear Klimavichy, now in Belarus, or Bryansk, Russia
- Died: 23 August 1977 (aged 87); Waterbury, Connecticut, U.S.
- Known for: Sculpture, kinetic art, printmaking
- Movement: Constructivism

Naum Gabo (born Naum Neemia Pevsner; Russian: Наум Борисович Певзнер; Hebrew: נחום נחמיה פבזנר; 5 August [O.S. 24 July] 1890 – 23 August 1977) was a Russian and American constructivist sculptor and theorist. He was a key figure in the Russian avant-garde and the subsequent development of 20th-century sculpture.

His work combined geometric abstraction with a dynamic organization of form in small reliefs and constructions, monumental public sculpture and pioneering kinetic works that assimilated new materials such as nylon, wire, lucite and semi-transparent materials, glass and metal. Responding to the scientific and political revolutions of his age, Gabo led an eventful and peripatetic life, moving to Berlin, Paris, Oslo, Moscow, London, and finally the United States, and within the circles of the major avant-garde movements of the day, including Cubism, Futurism, Constructivism, the Bauhaus, de Stijl and the Abstraction-Création group. Two preoccupations, unique to Gabo, were his interest in representing negative space—"released from any closed volume" or mass—and time. He famously explored the former idea in his Linear Construction works (1942-1971)—used nylon filament to create voids or interior spaces as "concrete" as the elements of solid mass—and the latter in his pioneering work, Kinetic Sculpture (Standing Waves) (1920), often considered the first kinetic work of art.

Gabo elaborated many of his ideas in the Constructivist Realistic Manifesto, which he issued with his brother, sculptor Antoine Pevsner as a handbill accompanying their 1920 open-air exhibition in Moscow. In it, he sought to move past Cubism and Futurism, renouncing what he saw as the static, decorative use of color, line, volume and solid mass in favor of a new element he called "the kinetic rhythms (…) the basic forms of our perception of real time." Gabo held a utopian belief in the power of sculpture—specifically abstract, Constructivist sculpture—to express human experience and spirituality in tune with modernity, social progress, and advances in science and technology. After working on a smaller scale in England during the war years (1936-1946), Gabo moved to the United States, where he received several public sculpture commissions, only some of which he completed. These include Constructie, a 25-metre (82 ft) commemorative monument in front of the Bijenkorf Department Store (1954, unveiled in 1957) in Rotterdam, and Revolving Torsion, a large fountain outside St Thomas' Hospital in London. The Tate Gallery, in Millbank, London, held a major retrospective of Gabo's work in 1966 and holds many key works in its collection, as do the Museum of Modern Art and Guggenheim Museum in New York. Work by Gabo is also included at Rockefeller Center in New York City and The Governor Nelson A. Rockefeller Empire State Plaza Art Collection in Albany, New York, US.

== Early life and education ==
Gabo's early life is obscure. It is unknown precisely when he was born, as his mother had told him he had been entered into the records as being older than he actually was, to avoid conscription or being sent to school. Gabo grew up in a Jewish family in the provincial Russian town of Bryansk, though Gabo reported his birthplace as 'Klimowitsch', presumably Klimavichy, now in Belarus. His father, Boris (Berko) Pevsner, worked as an engineer, and owned a factory. Gabo was seemingly the seventh of nine children, though only six survived childhood. His older brother was the fellow Constructivist artist Antoine Pevsner, leading Gabo to change his name to avoid any confusion. He was fluent in German, French, and English, in addition to his native Russian. The command of several languages contributed greatly to Gabo's mobility throughout his career.

In 1910, after schooling in Kursk, Gabo entered the Ludwig-Maximilians-Universität München to study medicine. He then switched to natural science, as well as having attended art history lectures by the historian Heinrich Wölfflin. In 1912, Gabo transferred to the Technical University of Munich, where he discovered abstract art and met the noted painter Wassily Kandinsky. A year later, Gabo moved to Paris to join Antoine, who was already established as a painter. Engineering training was key to the development of Gabo's sculptural work that often integrated machined elements. During this time, he was highly acclaimed by many critics and won awards such as the Logan Medal of the Arts (1954) and the A. W. Mellon Lectures in the Fine Arts (1959).

== Constructivism ==
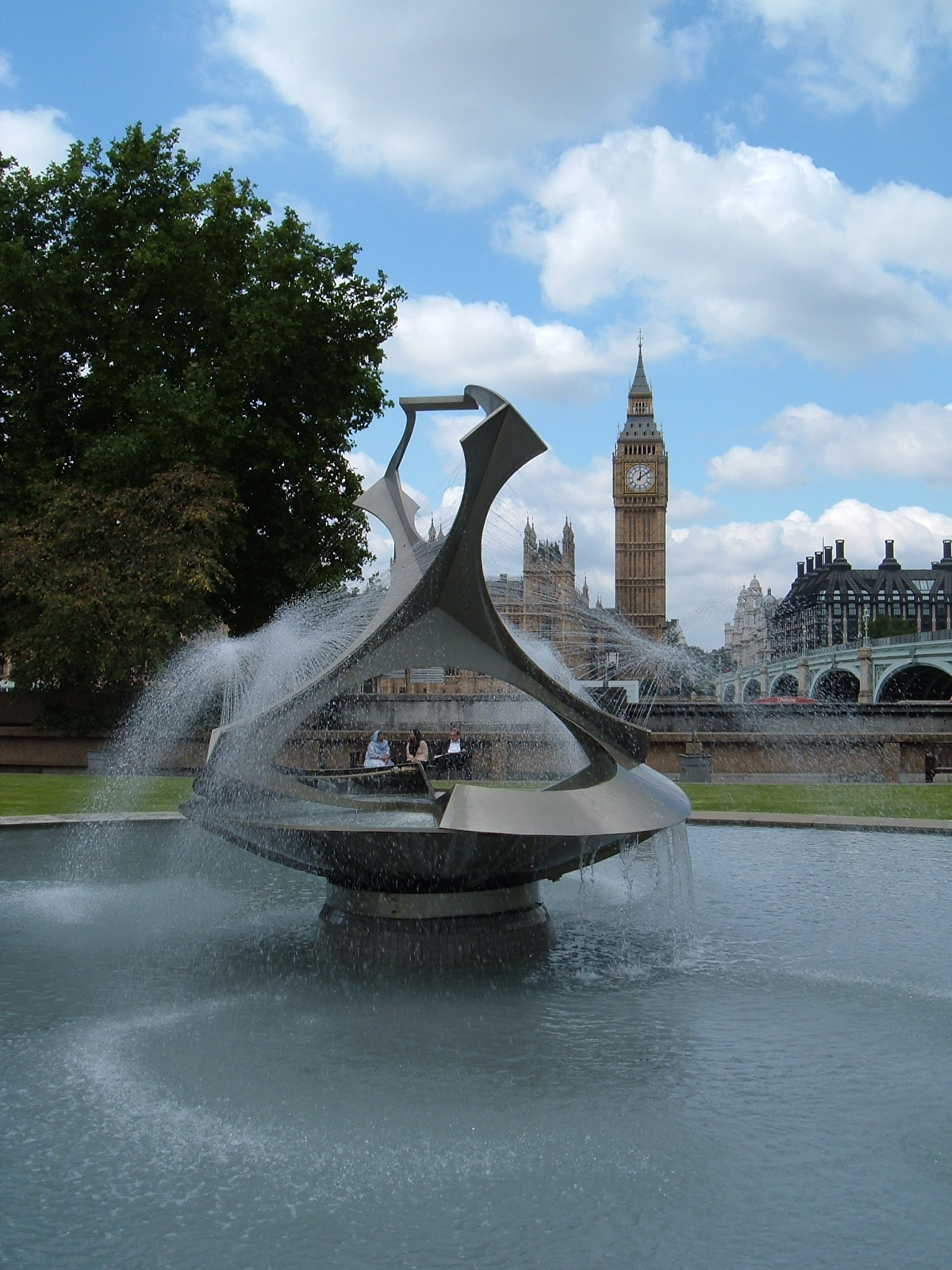
Revolving Torsion kinetic sculpture/fountain by Naum Gabo at St Thomas's Hospital, London, UK

After the outbreak of war, Gabo moved first to Copenhagen then Oslo with his older brother Alexei, making his first constructions under the name Naum Gabo in 1915. These earliest constructions originally in cardboard or wood were figurative such as the Head No.2 in the Tate collection. He moved back to Russia in 1917, to become involved in politics and art, spending five years in Moscow with his brother Antoine.

Gabo contributed to the Agit-prop open air exhibitions and taught at 'VKhUTEMAS' the Higher Art and Technical Workshop, with Tatlin, Kandinsky and Rodchenko. During this period the reliefs and construction became more geometric and Gabo began to experiment with kinetic sculpture though the majority of the work was lost or destroyed. Gabo's designs had become increasingly monumental but there was little opportunity to apply them; as he commented, "It was the height of civil war, hunger and disorder in Russia. To find any part of machinery … was next to impossible". Gabo wrote and issued jointly with Antoine Pevsner in August 1920 a "Realistic Manifesto" proclaiming the tenets of pure Constructivism – the first time that the term was used. In the manifesto Gabo criticized Cubism and Futurism as not becoming fully abstract arts and stated that the spiritual experience was the root of artistic production. Gabo and Pevsner promoted the manifesto by staging an exhibition on a bandstand on Tverskoy Boulevard in Moscow and posted the manifesto on hoardings around the city.

In Germany Gabo came into contact with the artists of the de Stijl and taught at the Bauhaus in 1928. During this period he realised a design for a fountain in Dresden (since destroyed). Gabo and Antoine Pevsner had a joint exhibition at the Galerie Percier, Paris in 1924 and the pair designed the set and costumes for Diaghilev's ballet La Chatte (1926) for the Ballets Russes that toured in Paris and London. To escape the rise of the Nazis in Germany the pair stayed in Paris in 1932–35 as members of the Abstraction-Creation group with Piet Mondrian.

Gabo visited London in 1935, and settled in 1936, where he found a "spirit of optimism and sympathy for his position as an abstract artist". At the outbreak of World War II he followed his friends Barbara Hepworth and Ben Nicholson to St Ives in Cornwall, where he stayed initially with the art critic Adrian Stokes and his wife Margaret Mellis. While in Cornwall he continued to work, albeit on a smaller scale. His influence was important to the development of modernism within St Ives, and it can be seen most conspicuously in the paintings and constructions of John Wells and Peter Lanyon, both of whom developed a softer more pastoral form of Constructivism.

In 1946, Gabo and his wife and daughter emigrated to Connecticut in the United States, where they resided first in Woodbury, and later in Middlebury. Gabo died in Waterbury, in 1977 and his wife in 1993.

== Gabo's theory of art ==
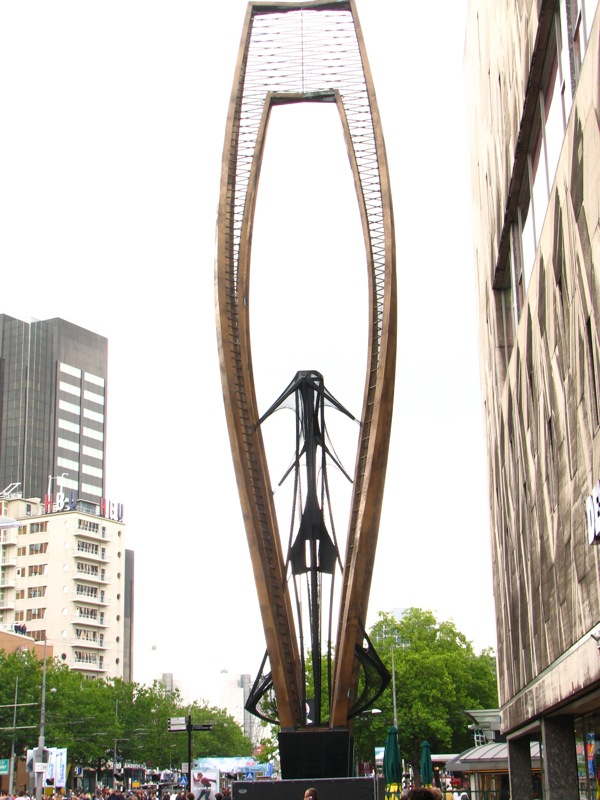
Metal sculpture 'untitled', by Gabo in Rotterdam, Netherlands

The essence of Gabo's art was the exploration of space, which he believed could be done without having to depict mass. His earliest constructions such as Head No.2 were formal experiments in depicting the volume of a figure without carrying its mass. Gabo's other concern as described in the Realistic Manifesto was that art needed to exist actively in four dimensions including time.

Gabo's formative years were in Munich, where he was inspired by and actively participated in the artistic, scientific, and philosophical debates of the early years of the 20th century. Because of his involvement in these intellectual debates, Gabo became a leading figure in Moscow’s avant garde, in post-Revolution Russia. At the Ludwig-Maximilians-Universität München, Gabo attended the lectures of art historian Heinrich Wölfflin and gained knowledge of the ideas of Einstein and his fellow innovators of scientific theory, as well as the philosopher Henri Bergson. As a student of medicine, natural science and engineering, his understanding of the order present in the natural world mystically links all creation in the universe. Just before the onset of the First World War in 1914, Gabo discovered contemporary art, by reading Kandinsky’s Concerning the Spiritual in Art, which asserted the principles of abstract art.

Gabo’s vision is imaginative and passionate. Over the years his exhibitions have generated immense enthusiasm because of the emotional power present in his sculpture. Gabo described himself as "making images to communicate my feelings of the world." In his work, Gabo used time and space as construction elements and in them solid matter unfolds and becomes beautifully surreal and otherworldly. His sculptures initiate a connection between what is tangible and intangible, between what is simplistic in its reality and the unlimited possibilities of intuitive imagination. Imaginative as Gabo was, his practicality lent itself to the conception and production of his works. He devised systems of construction which were not only used for his elegantly elaborate sculptures but were viable for architecture as well. He was also innovative in his works, using a wide variety of materials including the earliest plastics, fishing line, bronze, sheets of Perspex, and boulders. He sometimes even used motors to move the sculpture.

Caroline Collier, an authority on Gabo’s work, said, "The real stuff of Gabo’s art is not his physical materials, but his perception of space, time and movement. In the calmness at the ‘still centre’ of even his smallest works, we sense the vastness of space, the enormity of his conception, time as continuous growth." In fact, the element of movement in Gabo’s sculpture is connected to a strong rhythm, more implicit and deeper than the chaotic patterns of life itself. The exactness of form leads the viewer to imagine journeying into, through, over and around his sculptures.

Gabo wrote his Realistic Manifesto, in which he ascribed his philosophy for his constructive art and his joy at the opportunities opened up by the Russian Revolution. Gabo saw the Revolution as the beginning of a renewal of human values. Five thousand copies of the manifesto tract were displayed in Moscow streets in 1920.

== Printmaking ==
Gabo began printmaking in 1950, when he was persuaded to try out the medium by William Ivins, a former curator of prints at the Metropolitan Museum of Modern Art, New York. His first print was a wood engraving in a section of wood taken from a piece of furniture and printed onto a piece of toilet paper. He went on to produce a significant and varied body of graphic work, including much more elaborate and lyrical compositions, until his death in 1977.

Rejecting the traditional notion that prints should be made in editions of identical impressions, Gabo instead preferred to use the monoprint format as a vehicle for artistic experimentation.

== Art conservation challenges ==
Gabo pioneered the use of plastics, such as cellulose acetate, in his sculptures. The Tate Gallery in London, which has the world's largest collection of his early works, is battling their chemical degradation. They have commissioned replicas of some sculptures to preserve a visual record of their appearances.

== Writings ==
- Of Divers Arts (1962). New York: Faber and Faber. ISBN 978-0-571-05231-8

== See also ==
- List of honorary British knights and dames
