= Realistic Manifesto =

The Realistic Manifesto is a key text of Constructivism. Written by Naum "Gabo" Neemia Pevzner and cosigned by his brother, Antoine Pevsner, the Manifesto laid out their theories of artistic expression in the form of five "fundamental principles" of their constructivist practice. The Manifesto focused largely on divorcing art from such conventions as use of lines, color, volume, and mass. In the text, Gabo and Pevsner reject the successive stylistic innovations of modern art as mere illusionism (beginning with Impressionism, and including Cubism and Futurism), advocating instead an art grounded in the material reality of space and time: "The realization of our perceptions of the world in the forms of space and time is the only aim of our pictorial and plastic art."

The text was first published on August 5, 1920, in poster form, on the occasion of an exhibition with Gustav Klucis in Moscow. Extracts were reproduced in the first issue of G in 1923.
