= Antoine Pevsner =

Russian-French sculptor (1886–1962)

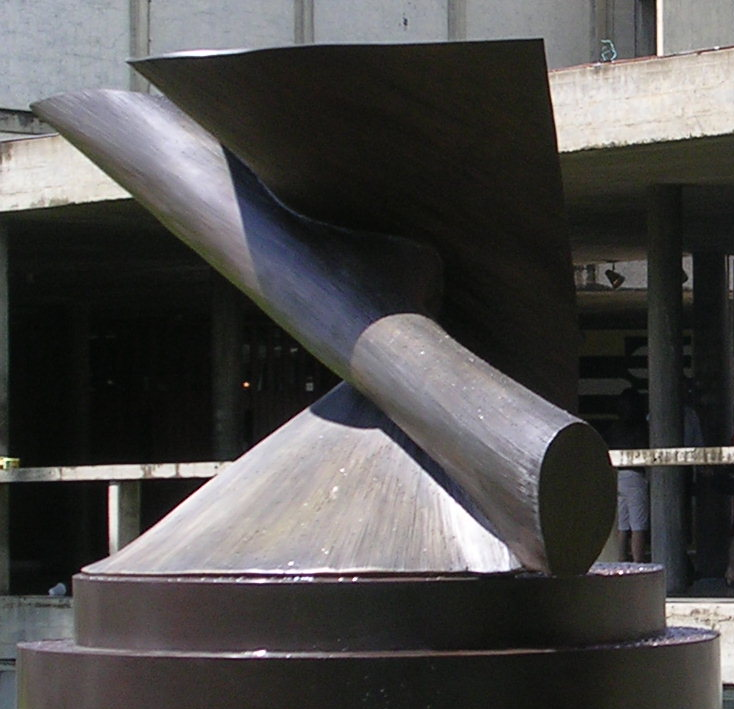
Projection dynamique au 30e degré (lit. "Dynamic projection at the 30th degree"), 1953, at City University of Caracas

Antoine Pevsner (born Anton (Natan) Abramovich (Borisovich) Pevzner; Russian: Антон [Натан] Абрамович [Борисович] Певзнер; 30 January [O.S. 18 January] 1886 – 12 April 1962) was a Russian-born French sculptor and the older brother of Alexii Pevsner and Naum Gabo. As the originators of Constructivism and pioneers of kinetic art, the brothers are considered pioneers of twentieth-century sculpture. They made numerous prominent pieces, for instance Antoine's widely known sculpture The Flight of the Bird, located at the General Motors Technical Center in Warren, Michigan.

== Biography ==
Pevsner was born as Anton (Natan) Abramovich (Borisovich) Pevzner, in Oryol, Russian Empire, into a Jewish family. Among the originators of and having coined the term, Constructivism, and pioneers of kinetic art, Pevsner and his brother Naum Gabo discovered a new use for metals and welding and made a new marriage of art and mathematics. Pevsner said: "Art must be inspiration controlled by mathematics. I have a need for peace, symphony, orchestration." He was one of the first to use the blowtorch in sculpture, welding copper rods onto sculptural forms. Along with his brother, Naum, he issued the Realist Manifesto in 1920, which they hung on the city wall. This text preaches a complete departure from the reality beyond which the brothers sought to transcend.

He left the Soviet Union in 1923 and moved to Paris, where he would live for the rest of his life. He began sculpting in 1923 and created assemblages in plastic, devising forms to give them colours through the interaction of components of the light spectrum.

In 1931, he joined the Parisian art movement Abstraction-Creation and became a member, and from 1946 he was the organiser of the New Realities exhibition salons.

Among the honors he received were a retrospective at the Museum of Modern Art in Paris (1956–1957) and the Legion of Honour (1961).
