= St Thomas Street, Southwark =

Street in London, England

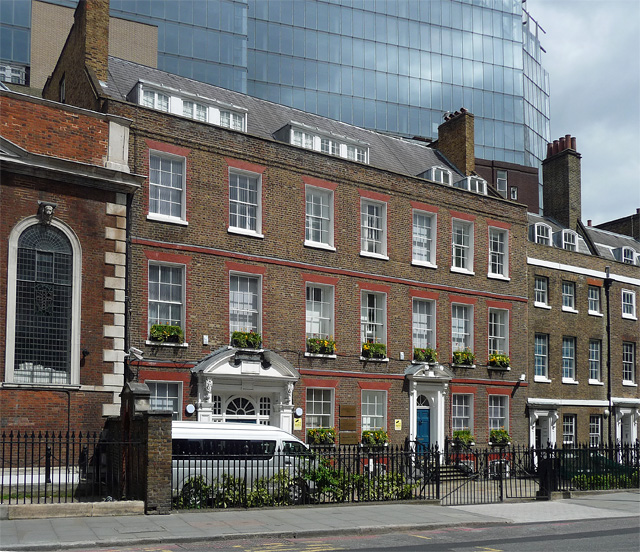
Number 9., St Thomas Street.

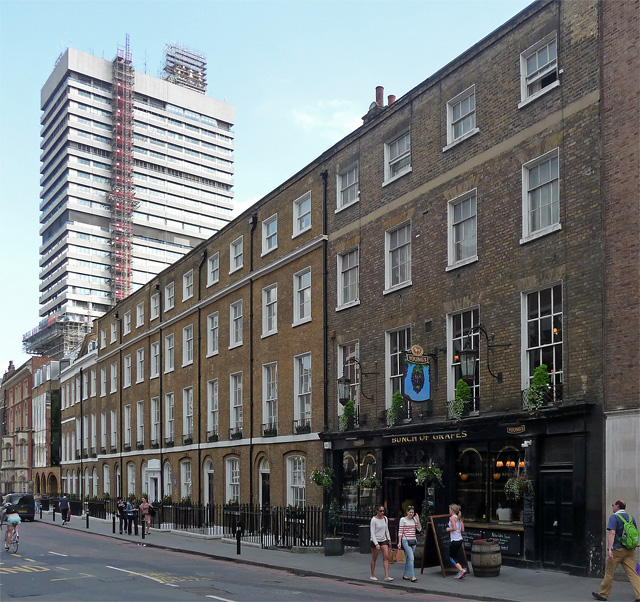
Houses and the Bunch of Grapes pub.

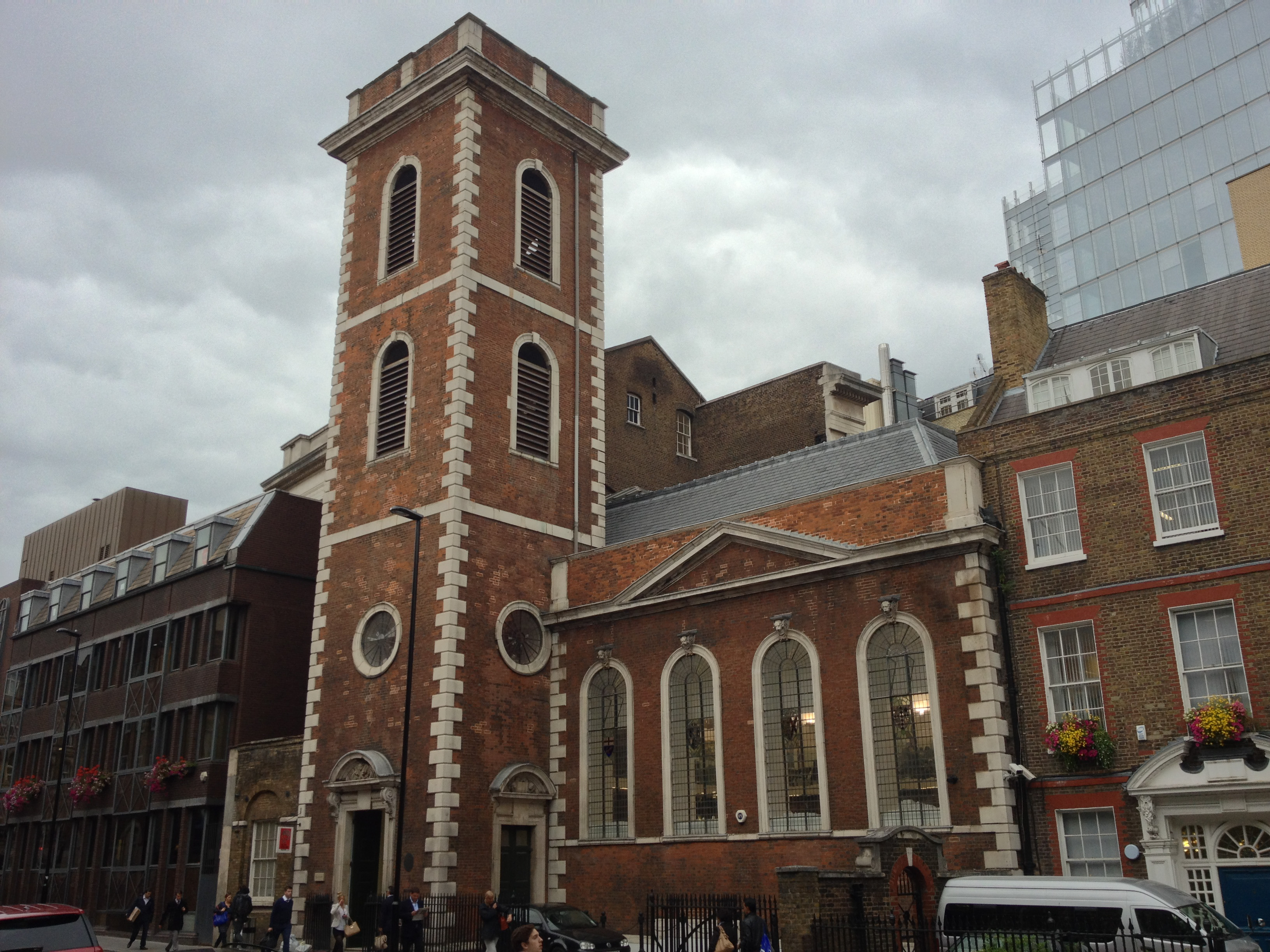
The former St Thomas' Church, Southwark.

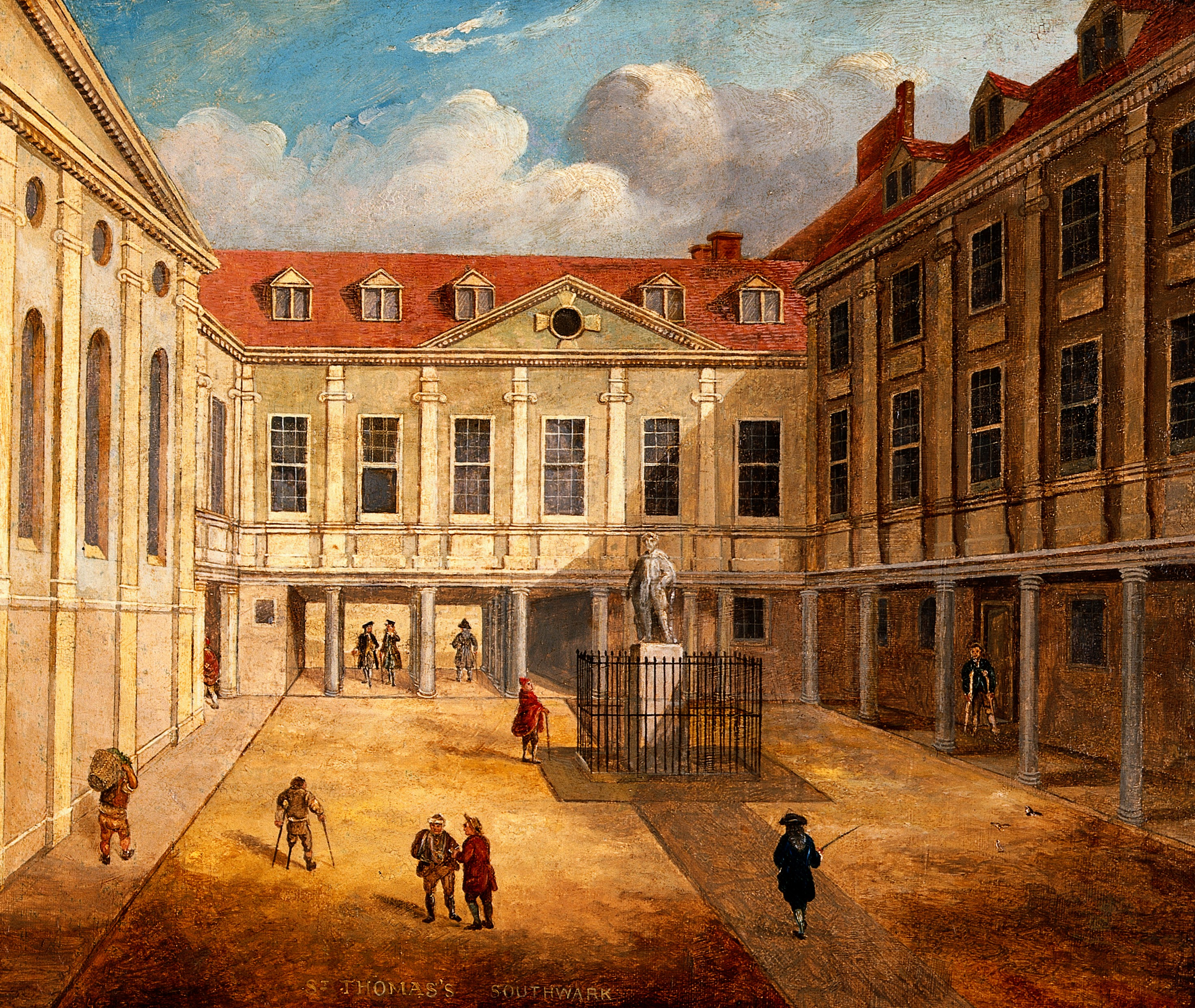
St Thomas' Hospital as it looked in the eighteenth century.

St Thomas Street is a street in Southwark in London located next to London Bridge station. It takes its name from St Thomas' Hospital which was originally located nearby and dates back to the mid-sixteenth century. It runs southeastwards off Borough High Street along the southern side of Bridge station until at a junction with Bermondsey Street it becomes Crucifix Lane. The street features many historic buildings including the former St Thomas' Church, constructed in 1702, which has functioned as the Chapter House of Southwark Cathedral and part of the operating theatre of St Thomas' Hospital. It is now home to the Old Operating Theatre Museum and Herb Garret. The entrance to The Shard skyscraper, opened in 2012, is on St Thomas Street.

== Bibliography ==
- Bebbington, Gillian. London Street Names. Batsford, 1972.
- Cherry, Bridget & Pevsner, Nikolaus. London 4: South. Yale University Press, 2002.
